= List of political scandals in South Korea =

This article provides a list of political scandals that involve officials from the government or politicians of South Korea.

== Koreagate (1976) ==
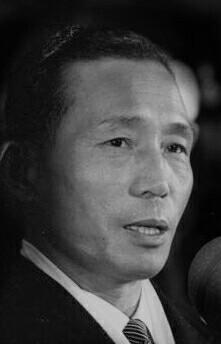
President Park Chung-hee

Koreagate is the name of a political bribery scandal revealed in 1976. It involves the Central Intelligence Agency South Korea (KCIA), Korean political figures and several U. S. congressmen. In 1971, U. S. President Richard Nixon announced his intention to withdraw U. S. troops from South Korea. The President of the Republic of Korea, Park Chung-hee, disagreed with Nixon's decision to withdraw soldiers from South Korea and felt that it was urgent to obtain support to preserve the remaining military presence of the United States. In 1976, KCIA spent millions of dollars to finance a project called Intrepid. The purpose of this program was to bring both President Nixon back on his decision and to ease the growing tensions between the two countries.

KCIA bribed some U. S. congressmen through Korean businessman Tongsun Park to seek favors and influence, for South Korean purposes.

The scandal was exposed just before the 1976 elections, leading to the failure of the "Intrepid" program. The new president, James Earl Carter Jr., had campaigned on a promise to phase out the remaining division in South Korea, and the revelation of the scandal further solidified that position. As promised, President Carter began withdrawing his troops on 13 December 1977. In 1978, congressional investigations revealed that 115 members of the Democratic Party were involved in the project, including the Speaker of the House, Thomas P. O'Neill Jr. Several members subsequently resigned or were sanctioned.

President Carter finally reconsidered the U. S. military commitments in South Korea and, on 29 June 1979, suspended the withdrawal.

== Gwangju massacre (1980) ==
In May 1980, democratic protesters were killed, wounded, and tortured by armed forces under the command of General Chun Doo-hwan, who had seized control of the government through the Coup d'état of December Twelfth of 1979. Although the government maintained that 190 people were killed in the Gwangju Uprising, unofficial estimates report up to 2,000 casualties.

== Lee–Chang scandal (1982) ==
The Lee–Chang scandal is a South Korean financial scandal that took place in 1982 under the presidency of Chun Doo-hwan. Jang Yeong-ja was a curbside market operator who provided loans to industrial companies, demanding notes worth several times the value of the loan, provided the notes were not resold. In this way, starting with $7 million saved through the alimony of her two former husbands, Jang personally manipulated nearly $1 billion through her underground lending network, or 17 percent of the total South Korean money supply. The network was discovered when one of the companies, whose Jang notes had sold at a reduced price, complained to the authorities.

The collapse of Jang's loan network caused the bankruptcy of two large industrial companies, the resignation and arrest of the bank directors Chohung and Sanop, and the suicide of a bank manager involved in the scandal. The scandal spread as the involvement of various political figures emerged. Jang's husband, Lee Chol-hui, was a former deputy director of KCIA and a classmate of Park Chung-hee. In addition, Jang's brother-in-law, Lee Gyu-gwang, was the uncle of President Chun himself, and he was considered to have played a key role in carrying out the fraud. Eleven cabinet members resigned and four others were replaced.

== Hanbo scandal (1997) ==
The Hanbo scandal or Hanbogate refers to the corruption involving senior South Korean government officials and top executives of Hanbo Steel conglomerate, then South Korea second biggest steelmaker and 14th biggest conglomerate. The resulting corruption scandal and trial of the first half of 1997 has been described as one of the largest ever in South Korea.

Hanbo Steel received illegal preferential treatment from the government of Korean president Kim Young Sam, including in form of loans, issued by banks to the company under pressure from bribed high ranking politicians and bankers. Losses from corruption and bribes are estimated at US$6 million.

Following a trial, by early June 1997, Chung Tae Soo, company's founder, was jailed for 15 years. His son Chung Bo Keun was jailed for 3 years. Eight other prominent figures, including former Home Minister, Kim Woo Suk, several presidential aides and parliament members, and two former presidents of the Korea First Bank, were handed sentences as well. Son of the president, Kim Hyun-chul, was also arrested in a related investigation and was sentenced to three years in October that year.

The scandal is seen as having contributed to the Korean economy troubles of that time (see also 1997 Asian financial crisis), exposing South Korean's economy weaknesses and corruption problems to the international financial community. Hanbo was also one of the first in at least 10 of series of large South Korean conglomerate bankruptcies that occurred shortly afterward (involving major companies like Kia Motors and Daewoo; the latter also part of a major corruption scandal). In politics, the presidents involvement also undermined his father's anti corruption campaign.

== Furgate (1999) ==
Furgate refers to the late-1990s corruption and scandal involving senior South Korean government figures and their wives, who have spent bribery money on luxury items, primarily furs and jewelry. The resulting scandal and trial of the first half of 1997 has been described as one of the largest ever scandals in South Korea.

== Cash-for-summit scandal (2003) ==
In 2003, it was discovered that the Kim Dae-jung administration had sent millions of dollars to North Korea to realize the 2000 inter-Korean summit, using Hyundai Asan as a conduit. Consequently, Chung Mong-hun, head of the company, committed suicide, and six people were convicted. This is known as the cash-for-summit scandal.

== X-file scandal (2005) ==
The X-file scandal is a 2005 South Korean political scandal. The scandal revolves around the unveiling of wiretap conversations to the media. Most of the conversations were conducted by Conservative politicians of the Grand National Party organizing bribes during the 1997 South Korean presidential election. However the recordings were made illegally. The scandal does not end there, as the authorities also examine the general role of the National Intelligence Service (NIS) in political and personal affairs.

In July 2005, South Korean police stormed the home of Kong Un-young, an intelligence agent at NIS, retrieving 274 cassettes. Kong tried to commit suicide, but did not succeed. Following the evidence of NIS participation, some Grand National Party leaders claim that the Roh Moo-hyun administration must have been aware of the wiretapping. However, members of the pro-government party Uri have accused the GNP leaders of being equally aware of this.

== Grand National Convention bribery incident (2008) ==
The corruption scandal at the 2008 Grand National Party convention prompted the departure of spokesman for the Korean National Assembly Park Hee-tae. A Saenuri party deputy, Koh Seung-duk, had revealed in early January 2008 that he had received a package of three million won from the Park Hee-tae team, a transaction confirmed by the former assistant of the latter. This case affected both Lee Myung-bak's government and the performance of the Grand National Party.

== South Korean illegal surveillance incident (2010) ==
The South Korean illegal surveillance incident (Korean: 민간인 불법사찰 사건, or illegal civilian surveillance incident) was alleged to have occurred in 2010 when the Civil Service Ethics Division (공직윤리지원관실) under the Prime Minister's Office of South Korea inspected a civilian, a political action that is illegal under the South Korean conventions. The incident re-emerged in early 2012 as the election approached.

== NIS public opinion manipulation scandal (2012) ==
In the 2012 South Korean presidential election, the National Intelligence Service was accused of wanting to influence public opinion to elect Park Geun-hye. The NIS then employed psychological warfare experts and conducted an aggressive Internet campaign to discredit Liberal opponent Moon Jae-in and convince voters still undecided. After the elections, South Korean police said that a Korean National Intelligence Service official, Kim Ha Young, posted articles on politically sensitive issues on the Todayhumor website. It was later acknowledged that NIS has been involved not only in political advertisements in newspapers by conservative groups, but also in the organization of events and the distribution of brochures. South Korean national intelligence chief Won Sei-hoon was prosecuted for interfering in the elections.

== Sinking of MV Sewol (2014) ==
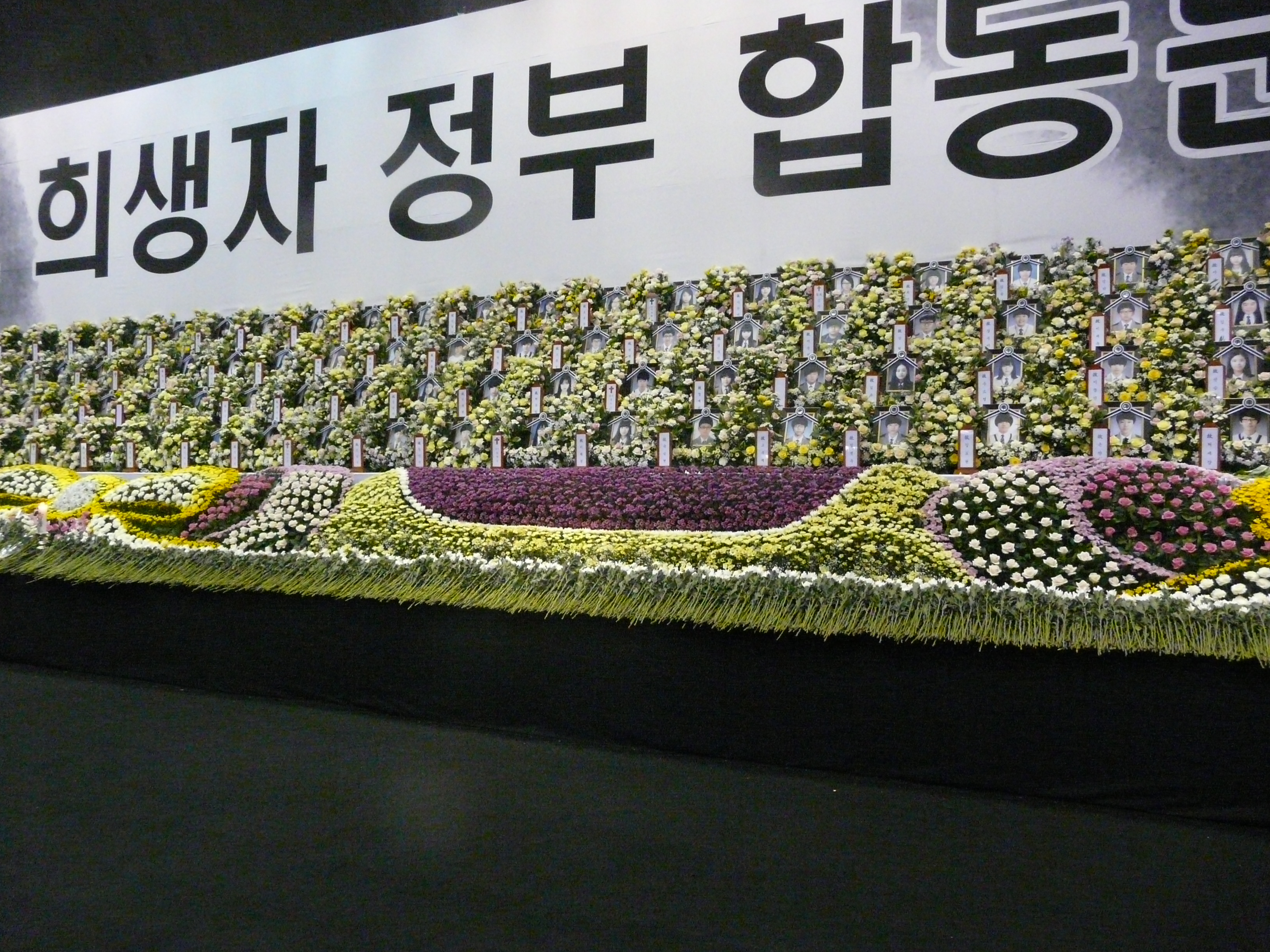
Memorial for the victims of the sinking MV Sewol.

In 2014, the MV Sewol shipwrecked with 476 passengers on board. Of those, 304 people perished, including students of Danwon High School (Ansan) gone on a school trip. The tragedy had several causes: the ship was overloaded and insufficiently ballasted, illegal work to increase the number of cabins made the ship unstable and the crew was poorly trained and incompetent. The latter, facing the strong current, veered too quickly and capsized the ship. Additionally, the captain as well as the crew members ordered the passengers not to move while the boat sank and abandoned the boat. Many criticisms have been levied against the government, Among them are accusations of mismanagement of the aftermath of the disaster, of inadequate response and of minimizing its responsibility. Prime Minister Chung Hong-won subsequently resigned eleven days after the tragedy.

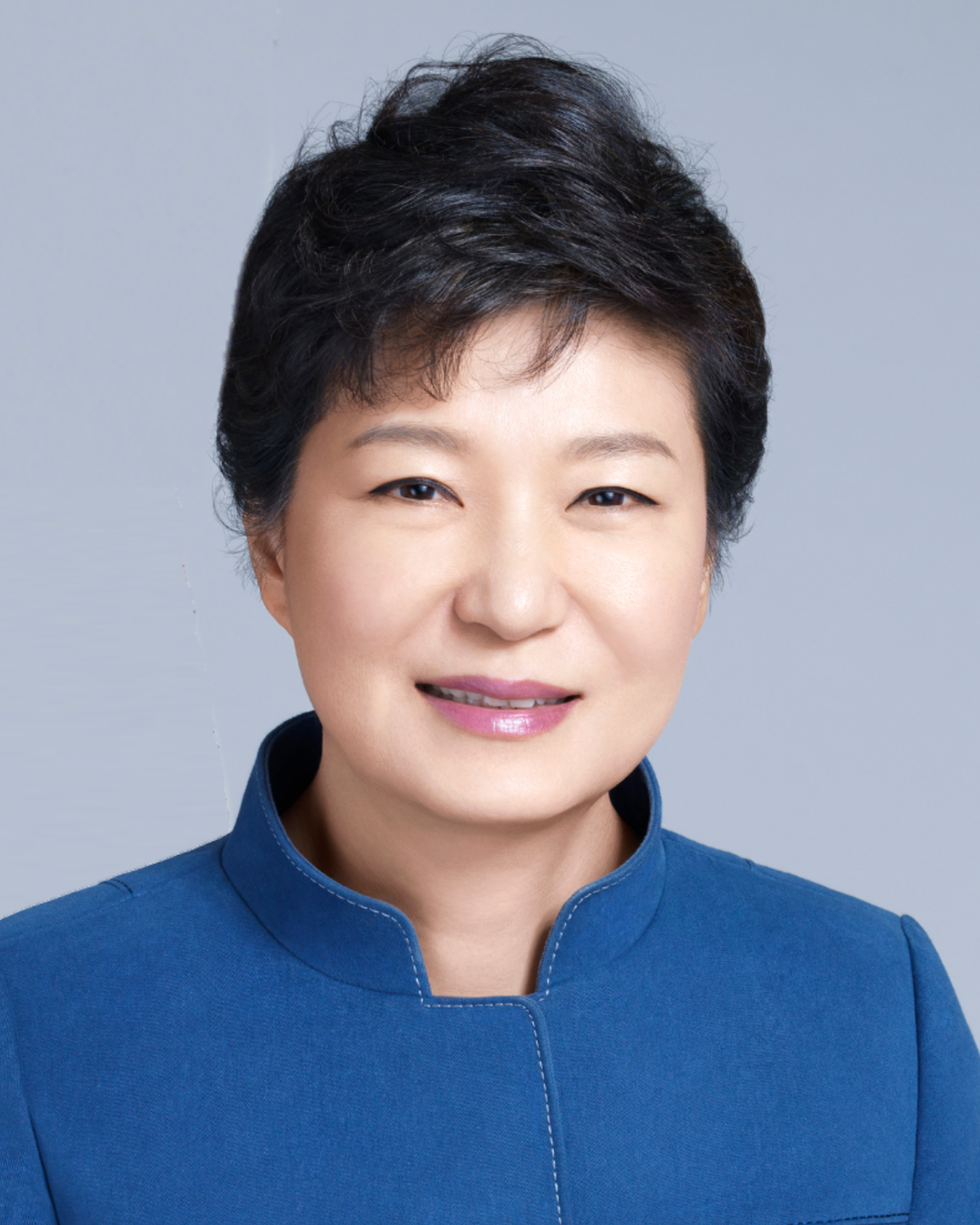
President Park Geun-hye.

== Choi Soon-sil scandal and removal of Park Geun-hye (2016) ==
The Choi Soon-sil scandal, also known as Choigate or Choïgate, is a major political scandal that took place at the end of 2016 involving Choi Soon-sil, South Korean businesswoman and confidante of the president, Park Geun-hye. This case resulted in a process of dismissal of President Park for abuse of authority. Indeed, thanks to her close ties with the president, Choi had access to confidential documents, became involved in various state affairs and put pressure on different chaebols (national companies). Park and drew them 77.4 billion won ($60 million) for her personal use. On 13 February 2018, Choi Soon-sil is sentenced to twenty years in prison. On 6 April 2018, the President was convicted of abuse of authority, corruption and coercion and sentenced to 24 years in prison.

== Blacklist scandal (2016) ==
Under the Park Geun-hye administration, a blacklist of 9473 artists deemed critical of the government had been established by the Korean Ministry of Culture, Sport and Tourism to exclude them from public subsidies and participate in the France-Korea cross year in 2015-2016 to celebrate the 130 years of relations between the two countries. The document included four categories: a group that took part in a statement calling for the government's Sewol decree to be overturned, a group denouncing the government's management of the Sewol shipwreck, a group that supported candidate Moon Jae-in and a group that supported the Park Won-soon candidate. Culture Minister Cho Yoon-sun was sentenced to two years in prison for her role in establishing the blacklist.

== Opinion rigging scandal (2018) ==
The 2018 opinion rigging scandal in South Korea is a political scandal that erupted in April 2018 after a group of ardent supporters of the South Korean President Moon Jae-in had been charged with online opinion rigging. The accused suspects were the members of the ruling Democratic Party (DPK). The main perpetrator, as well as the leader of the pro-Moon group, was a well-known power-blogger called "Druking."

== See also ==
- BBK stock price manipulation incident
- MOFAT Diamond scandal
