= South Korean nuclear scandal =

A nuclear scandal took place in South Korea, when the country faced a series of shutdowns, of nuclear reactors because of fake documents. The documents dated back to 2012. South Korea itself depends heavily on nuclear power.

== Investigation ==
During November 2012, two nuclear reactors were suspended by the country after discovering that the parts were supplied with fake certificates.

On 10 October 2013, South Korea indicted about 100 people, which included a top former state utility official with the charges of scandal. Officials further noted that they will bring back into compliance those reactors that were suspended for inspection and replacement of parts.

On 7 February 2014, the Nuclear Safety and Security Commission declared that its investigation since mid-2013, they found eight cases out of 2,075 samples of foreign manufactured reactor components that were supplied with fake documents. Although the names of dealing countries remains undisclosed.

== See also ==
- Nuclear power in South Korea
- Corruption in South Korea
- Anti-nuclear movement in South Korea
- One Less Nuclear Power Plant
- Tokyo Electric Power Company#Safety incidents
- Nuclear and radiation accidents
