= Corruption in South Korea =

Corruption in South Korea is moderate compared to most countries in the Asia–Pacific and the broader international community. Transparency International's 2025 Corruption Perceptions Index, scored South Korea at 63 on a scale from 0 ("highly corrupt") to 100 ("very clean"). When ranked by score, South Korea ranked 31st among the 182 countries in the Index, where the country ranked first is perceived to have the most honest public sector. For comparison with regional scores, the best score among those countries of the Asia Pacific region that appeared in the Index (Note: Afghanistan, Australia, Bangladesh, Bhutan, Brunei Darussalam, Cambodia, China, Fiji, Hong Kong, India, Indonesia, Japan, North Korea, South Korea, Laos, Malaysia, Maldives, Mongolia, Myanmar, Nepal, New Zealand, Pakistan, Papua New Guinea, Philippines, Singapore, Solomon Islands, Sri Lanka, Taiwan, Thailand, Timor-Leste, Vanuatu, and Vietnam) was 84, the average score was 45 and the worst score was 15. For comparison with worldwide scores, the best score was 89 (ranked 1), the average score was 42, and the worst score was 9 (ranked 181, in a two-way tie).

== Notable cases ==
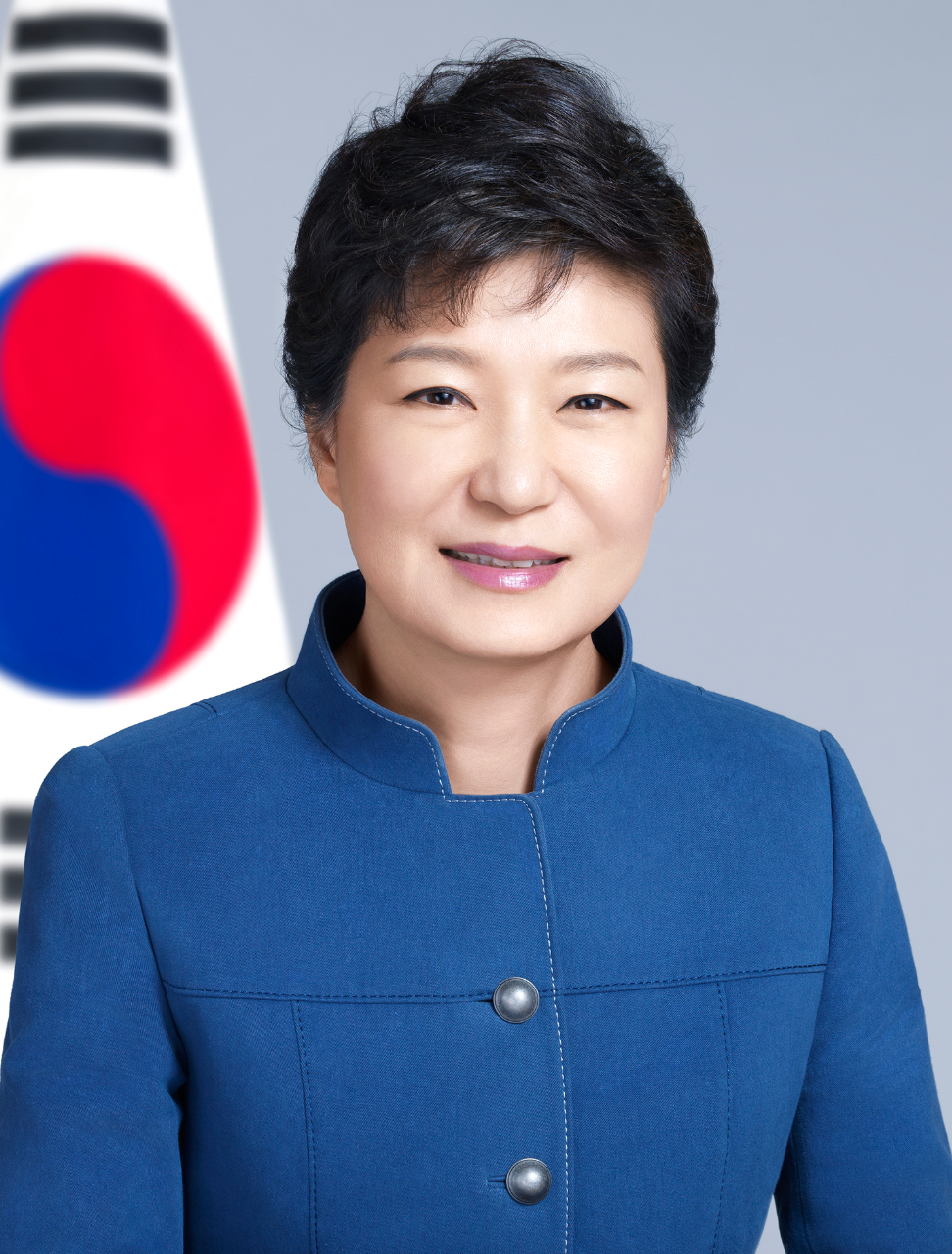
Former South Korean president Park Geun-hye was sentenced to 25 years in prison due to corruption scandals.

Former South Korean president Park Geun-hye was found guilty of 16 charges, including abuse of power and bribery, and was then imprisoned for 25 years. Another former president Lee Myung-bak was also charged with corruption scandals involving major companies in 2018 and was sentenced to 17 years in jail.

As a result of such scandals, coupled with other incidents, such as the Sewol ferry disaster, a 2015 report released by the Organisation for Economic Co-operation and Development (OECD) showed that "almost 70 percent of South Koreans distrust their government, while less than 30 percent of them are confident in the nation's judicial system." This rate is significantly lower than the OECD average, which was 41.8 percent. Despite South Korea's low public confidence rate in 2015, it was at least a step up from the rate in 2007 by 10 percentage points.

The South Korean government has taken steps to fight corruption, such as the Act on the Protection of Public Interest Whistle-Blowers which protects whistleblowers who report public and private corruption as well as foreign bribery. Public services have also been digitalised to avoid opportunities for corruption. However, large chaebols pose significant difficulties as illicit business behaviour is still common among them. Some of the large conglomerates have been involved in tax evasion and corruption, and their powerful role in South Korea's economy has made corruption investigations very difficult.

Founder and leader of a messianic Christian church Shincheonji, Lee Man-hee, was convicted of embezzling 5.6 billion won, or $5.1 million, from church funds to build a luxurious “peace palace” north of Seoul.

In April 2025, former South Korean President Moon Jae-in was indicted on corruption charges by the Jeonju District Prosecutors' Office. The charges relate to the alleged facilitation of his son-in-law’s employment at Thai Eastar Jet, a low-cost airline reportedly controlled by a former lawmaker from Moon's political party.

The conservative People Power Party (PPP) and the liberal Democratic Party are embroiled in a political scandal involving allegations of receiving illegal political funds and gifts from the Unification Church (formally the Family Federation for World Peace and Unification). Hak Ja Han, the leader of the Unification Church (whose members are called Unificationists or sometimes informally Moonies), was arrested in South Korea in September 2025 on various corruption charges, including bribery and embezzlement. Also indicted in 2025 were Jeong Won-ju, who served as Han's chief of staff, and former World Headquarters Director-General Yun Young-ho.

In January 2026, the South Korean government launched a major joint investigation into the Unification Church and the Shincheonji Church of Jesus over allegations of bribery, election interference, and corrupt ties to politicians.

== Notable incidents ==
- 2016 South Korean political scandal
- BBK stock price manipulation incident
- Daewoo dissolution and corruption scandal
- Grand National Party Convention bribery incident
- Gwangju Inhwa School
- Improper Solicitation and Graft Act
- Jeon-gwan ye-u
- MOFAT Diamond scandal
- South Korean illegal surveillance incident
- South Korean nuclear scandal
