= MOFAT Diamond scandal =

2012 scandal in South Korea

The MOFAT Diamond Scandal involves allegations against a senior South Korean government official accused of insider trading and stock-price manipulation in collaboration with CNK International, a mining company that secured the rights to a diamond mine in Cameroon.

The scandal began with a press release issued by the South Korean Ministry of Foreign Affairs and Trade (MOFAT) on 17 December 2010. This announcement, led by Energy and Resources Ambassador Kim Eun-seok, claimed that CNK International had secured the rights to develop a diamond mine in Cameroon, purportedly containing approximately 420 million carats (185,000 lb) of diamonds. This figure was based on CNK International's research reports, which were later found to be exaggerated and misleading. Following the press release, CNK International's share price surged to approximately 18,500 Korean won. When the company was unable to substantiate the magnitude of the diamond reserve it had previously announced, the share price plummeted to 2,000 Korean won within a matter of weeks.

Ambassador Kim faced accusations of insider trading for allegedly sharing non-public information with family members. However, the timeline between the stock purchases made by his family members and the press release that inflated CNK International's stock price was substantial. As a result, the insider trading charges were ultimately dropped.

This incident prompted criticisms against the Lee Myung-bak government. The investigation also implicated other high-ranking officials and members of CNK International, leading to criminal referrals and further scrutiny. Both Ambassador Kim and CNK Chairman Oh Deok-gyun were acquitted of stock manipulation charges. Ambassador Kim was demoted, and CNK Chairman Oh was convicted of breach of fiduciary duty, being sentenced to 3 years in prison and 5 years probation.

== CNK International ==
Originally registered as a food distribution company specializing in pork, Koko Enterprises transitioned to a metalworking business in December 2008, laying the groundwork for its entry into the diamond mining industry. In March 2009, Oh Deok-gyun assumed the role of chairman of the KOSDAQ-listed company and acquired another business engaged in the cutting, production, and wholesale and retail sale of diamonds. In April 2011, Koko Enterprises rebranded itself as CNK International, adopting the name of C&K Mining (Cameroon & Korea Mining Inc.), a company previously led by Oh Deok-gyun. By this time, the Ministry of Foreign Affairs and Trade had already issued a press release announcing CNK International's mining rights in Cameroon, triggering a significant surge in the company's stock price.

=== Research reports of CNK International ===
In early 2007, Professor Kim Won-sa from the Department of Geological Sciences at Chungnam National University, leading the South Korea-Cameroon joint geological survey team, announced the discovery of a diamond deposit estimated to contain about 10,000 carats (4.4 lb). In March 2008, the team reported another found near the Mobilong diamond mine, estimated at 700 million carats (310,000 lb).

Professor Kim died in October 2008. Before his death, he warned of challenges in accurately assessing the deposit due to thick soil layers and dense rainforest in eastern Cameroon. C&K Mining, which commissioned the exploration, aimed to reach the conglomerate layer, requiring excavation to a depth of 100 meters (330 ft).

In February 2009, C&K Mining submitted an exploration report to the Cameroonian government for a mining permit. A year later, in February 2010, it submitted an additional report at the government's request, estimating the diamond deposit size at 0 carats per cubic meter (0 lb/cu ft).

Nevertheless, CNK International relied on 1980s United Nations Development Programme data, which estimated diamond concentrations ranging from zero to 0.37 carats per cubic meter (0.0021 g/ft^{3}). Using an assumed value of 0.34 carats per cubic meter (0.0019 g/ft^{3}) and applying it to Mobilong's estimated 1.24 billion cubic meters (0.30 mi^{3}) of conglomerate, CNK arrived at an inflated estimate of 421.6 million carats (185,900 lb) – about 2.5 times the world's total diamond production in 2007.

== Lee Myung-bak's resource diplomacy ==
The diamond scandal unfolded during the Lee Myung-bak administration's push for "resource diplomacy," a foreign policy initiative aimed at securing resource autonomy through international collaboration. In April 2008, two months after his inauguration, President Lee visited the United States, Japan, China, and Russia. During his meeting with US President George W. Bush, he proposed commercializing gas hydrates found off South Korea's coast and sought US support. Resource diplomacy also dominated Lee's September 2008 visit to Russia, where he met President Dmitry Medvedev and Prime Minister Vladimir Putin. The talks resulted in South Korea joining a project to transport Siberian natural gas via a pipeline through North Korea to Seoul.

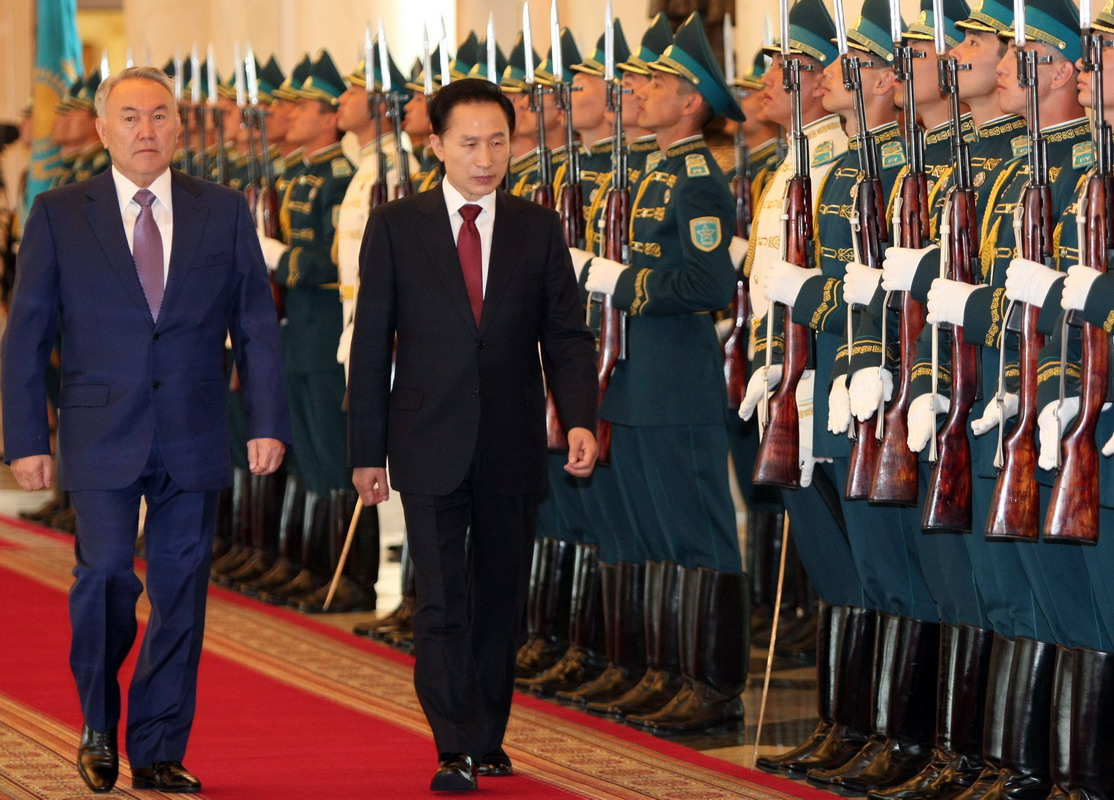
President Lee Myung-bak's state visit to Kazakhstan in 2012

In May 2008, Prime Minister Han Seung-soo visited three Central Asian nations – Uzbekistan, Kazakhstan, and Turkmenistan – as well as Azerbaijan to promote South Korea's resource diplomacy initiatives. Before his departure, Han stated that he would support South Korean businesses engaged in energy diplomacy with these countries and work to ensure stable and consistent energy partnerships. During his visit, Han discussed joint energy and resource development projects and finalized a long-term contract with Uzbekistan to secure 2,600 metric tons (2,600 long tons; 2,900 short tons) of Uzbek uranium through 2016.

In 2008, a South Korean consortium signed agreements with the semiautonomous Kurdish government in February and September to develop oil fields in northern Iraq. However, the project's future remained uncertain due to anticipated opposition from the central government in Baghdad. In January 2009, the Iraqi central government halted oil exports to South Korea in retaliation. The Korea National Oil Corporation, which led the consortium, withdrew from the Kurdistan exploration block in 2016 and subsequently terminated its oil-field projects in the region.

== Energy and Resources Ambassador Kim Eun-seok ==
Energy and Resources Ambassador Kim Eun-seok oversaw the press release on 17 December 2010, in which the ministry not only confirmed the exaggerated diamond deposit estimate but also promoted it as a success of the Lee Myung-bak government's "resource diplomacy." This led to CNK International's stock price quintupling shortly after.

The stock surge prompted an investigation by South Korea's financial regulators, resulting in criminal referrals. Ambassador Kim was investigated for insider trading and stock manipulation after sharing nonpublic information with family members. However, the insider trading charge was dropped as the stocks were purchased long before the press release, making a clear connection difficult to establish. He was later indicted for colluding with CNK International to manipulate stock prices but was ultimately acquitted by the Supreme Court.

During the trial, prosecutors revealed that Kim had pressured junior diplomats to support CNK International Chairman Oh Deok-gyun. Emails showed that he had asked then-Ambassador to Cameroon Lee Ho-seong to review a past United Nations Development Programme exploration, which had found no significant results. After Lee's lukewarm response, Kim turned to more aggressive tactics, threatening a lower-level foreign ministry official who suggested Lee inquire directly with CNK International. Kim warned he would report the official to the Blue House for "obstructing major diplomatic efforts". He was also suspected of introducing Chairman Oh to high-ranking government officials, including former Vice Minister of Knowledge Economy Park Young-joon, and lobbying Cameroonian officials on CNK International's behalf, fueling suspicions of collusion.

Kim was suspended almost immediately after the scandal gained media attention and was later demoted. Then-Foreign Minister Kim Sung-hwan reportedly approved the suspension before the Board of Audit and Inspection could determine whether Kim had actively colluded with CNK International or deliberately overstated the Mobilong mine's diamond reserves. Kim challenged both the suspension and demotion in court. Although acquitted of stock manipulation, the Supreme Court upheld his demotion, ruling that he had failed in his duty to verify CNK International's unfounded claims, violating public trust. However, the court reinstated him, ending his nearly six-year suspension.

== Development ==
On 17 December 2010, Energy and Resources Ambassador Kim Eun-seok's press release highlighted CNK International's acquisition of diamond mining rights in Cameroon, portraying it as a significant achievement in the Lee Myung-bak administration's resource diplomacy efforts. Issued by the Lee Myung-bak government, the press release officially confirmed that a Korean mining company had secured a significant diamond mining operation. It led to a surge in CNK International's stock price, reaching a peak of ₩18,500 on 19 August 2011. The dramatic increase in CNK's stock price prompted the National Assembly to request an investigation by the Board of Audit and Inspection into potential stock manipulation and insider trading by government officials, including Ambassador Kim Eun-seok. In October 2011, the Board of Audit and Inspection and the Financial Supervisory Service initiated a joint investigation into the matter.

The investigation into CNK International triggered investor anxiety, causing its stock price to decline to ₩10,000 by December 2011. On 17 January 2012, the Ministry of Foreign Affairs and Trade suspended Ambassador Kim pending the outcome of the investigation. Subsequently, on 19 January 2012, the Knowledge Economy Committee of the National Assembly referred CNK Chairman Oh Deok-gyun and Ambassador Kim Eun-seok to the Seoul Southern District Prosecutors' Office for criminal investigation, criticizing the slow pace of the ongoing investigation. This development further accelerated the selloff of CNK International shares, closing at ₩6,610 on 19 January 2012. On 26 January 2012, the inspection board released its findings, revealing that Kim Eun-seok had shared information about CNK International's diamond project with his siblings in 2009. His siblings subsequently purchased CNK International shares between March and April 2009, and by January 2010, they had acquired a total of 80,000 shares. As of 31 August 2011, Kim's siblings had realized ₩20,194,000 in capital gains while retaining 78,000 shares. The inspection board recommended Kim's dismissal, leading to a further decline in CNK International's stock price, closing at ₩4,065 on 26 December 2012.

On 19 January 2012, the opposition Democratic United Party and the anti-Lee Myung-bak faction of the ruling Grand National Party under Park Geun-hye threatened to launch an additional National Assembly investigation into whether higher-ranking officials were involved, including President Lee's older brother. President Lee's older brother had been involved in President Lee's resource-diplomacy efforts. However, such an investigation did not materialize.

Following a recommendation for dismissal by the inspection board, Kim was referred to the Central Disciplinary Committee of the Ministry of Foreign Affairs and Trade on 27 January 2012. The committee subsequently demoted Kim from Grade 1 to Grade 3 public servant as a disciplinary measure.

On 26 January 2013, the Seoul Central District Prosecutors' Office raided the headquarters of CNK International and the residences of Chairman Oh Deok-gyun and Cho Joong-pyo, a former Vice Foreign Minister and adviser to CNK International. Cho Joong-pyo was accused of transmitting falsified CNK International reports to the Ministry of Foreign Affairs and engaging in insider trading using family members' names to generate approximately ₩1 billion (2012) (equivalent to ₩1.27 billion or US$947,564.76 in 2025) in profits.

On 30 January 2012, the Seoul Central District Prosecutors' Office conducted the first-ever raid on the Ministry of Foreign Affairs and Trade, following the issuance of a search warrant. On 6 March 2012, prosecutors requested an arrest warrant for Kim, which was subsequently denied by a judge. The judge determined that Kim posed no flight risk, given his existing travel ban, and that the prosecution had failed to sufficiently substantiate that Kim might destroy evidence. Prosecutors subsequently added a perjury charge to the indictment, alleging that Kim had falsely testified during a 2011 National Assembly hearing. They claimed that Kim had misrepresented the source of the diamond deposit estimates in the press release, attributing them to official Cameroonian government data when, in fact, they were derived from exaggerated CNK reports without independent verification.

On 19 February 2013, Kim and four other key figures, including CNK Chairman Oh Deok-gyun, a CNK International lawyer, and two accountants, were indicted for violating the Financial Investment Services and Capital Markets Act and deliberately overestimating CNK International's market value. Kim, informed by the South Korean ambassador to Cameroon about CNK International's mining deal, shared this information with Vice Minister of Knowledge Economy Park Young-joon, who was not within Kim's direct chain of command. While this action implicated Park in the criminal investigation, all charges against him were eventually dropped.

At the time of the indictment, Chairman Oh was on the run, allegedly in Cameroon. He returned to South Korea on 23 March 2014, after 2 years as a fugitive. Upon arrival, Oh was immediately arrested. On 13 April 2014, Oh was indicted on charges of stock manipulation and on 10 July 2014, breach of fiduciary duty in the amount of ₩10 billion (2014) (equivalent to ₩12.38 billion or US$9.24 million in 2025) was added to his charges.

== Aftermath ==
On 23 January 2015, the trial court acquitted Kim Eun-seok of all charges. While Chairman Oh was found not guilty of stock manipulation, he was sentenced to one year and six months in prison, followed by two years of probation, for breach of fiduciary duty.

The prosecution appealed the acquittal of Kim Eun-seok to the Seoul High Court. On 3 February 2016, the appellate court upheld Kim's acquittal, acknowledging the factual basis of certain elements in the press release, including the involvement of the Cameroonian government in the geological survey. While not definitively excluding the possibility of collusion between Kim and CNK International, the court determined that the evidence was insufficient to render a conviction.

Regarding Chairman Oh Deok-gyun, the appellate court reversed the lower court's ruling. Oh was found guilty of stock price manipulation, having embellished company reports with baseless estimates presented as scientific fact. This conduct was deemed to have unfairly influenced the capital market, constituting a breach of fiduciary duty. As a result, Oh was sentenced to three years in prison and five years of probation.

Prosecution appealed Kim's acquittal to the Supreme Court. On 8 June 2017, the Supreme Court dismissed the prosecution's case against Ambassador Kim but upheld the lower court's verdict against Chairman Oh.

When criminal proceedings were underway, Kim initiated an administrative lawsuit against the foreign minister, seeking reversal of disciplinary actions. The court of first instance ruled in Kim's favor, asserting that passionately promoting his perceived accomplishments, even if slightly exaggerated, was not grounds for disciplinary action. The appellate court upheld this decision, emphasizing the discretionary authority of senior diplomats in supporting specific enterprises. However, on 8 January 2018, the Supreme Court reversed the lower court rulings. The court determined that Kim had neglected his duty as a civil servant by failing to verify CNK's claims and that his endorsement of the company's business had led to significant financial gains for CNK International at the expense of ordinary investors and the health of the financial market. The court also noted that, despite internal opposition, Kim had created and published a second press release that falsely implied official endorsement from the Cameroonian government. The Supreme Court concluded that Kim's actions had damaged public trust in the foreign ministry and tarnished diplomatic reputation, ultimately upholding the demotion but overturning the dismissal.

CNK International filed a lawsuit against the Korea Exchange, challenging the Korea Exchange's decision to delist CNK International from KOSDAQ. In January 2020, the Supreme Court upheld the lower court ruling, reaffirming the delisting of CNK International. As of January 2023, the web link of CNK International's homepage is connected to an illegal gambling site.

== See also ==
- Corruption in South Korea
- Prime Minister's Office Civilian Surveillance Incident
- 2008 Grand National Party Convention Bribery Incident
