= Impeachment of Park Geun-hye =

2016 South Korean charging of president

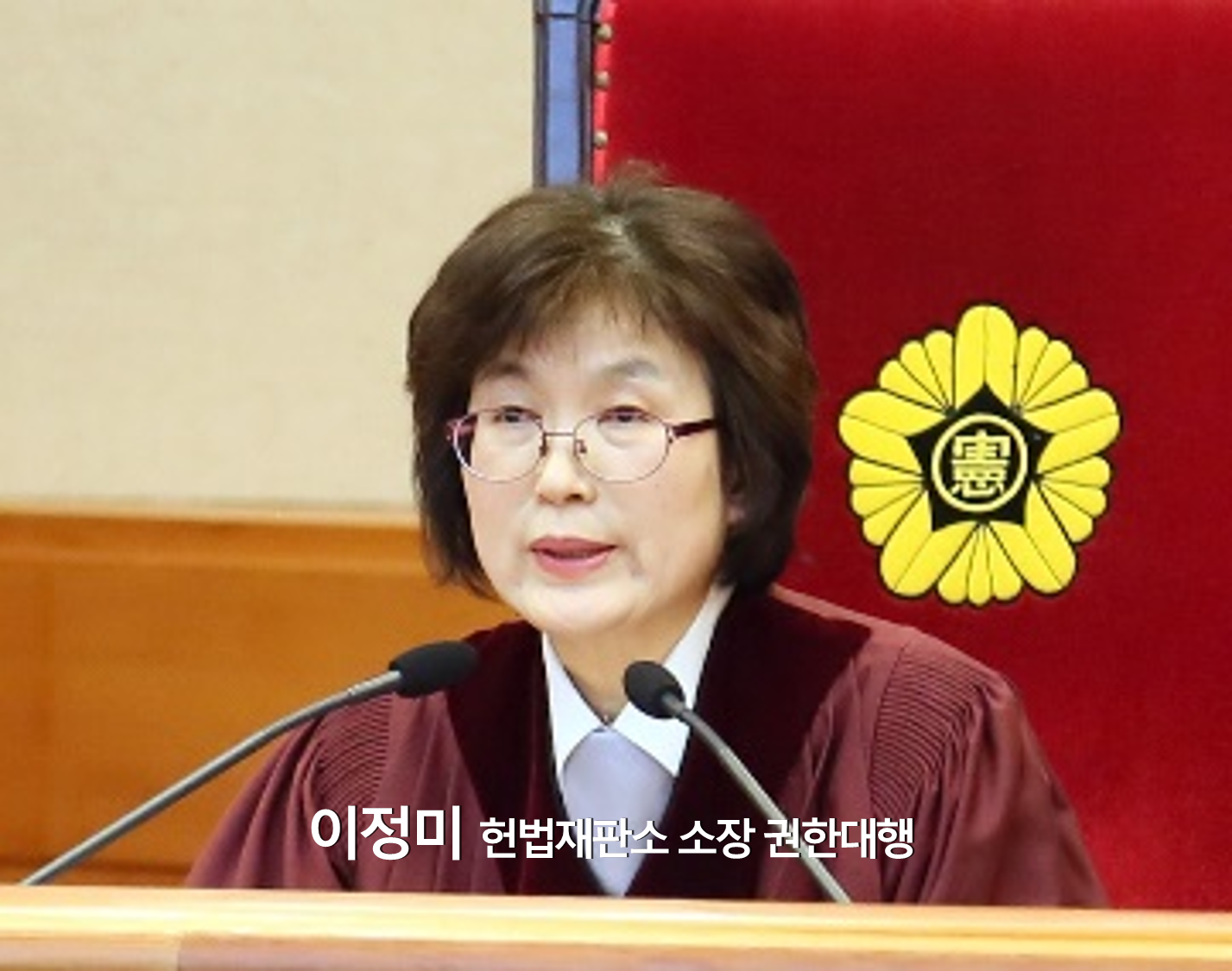
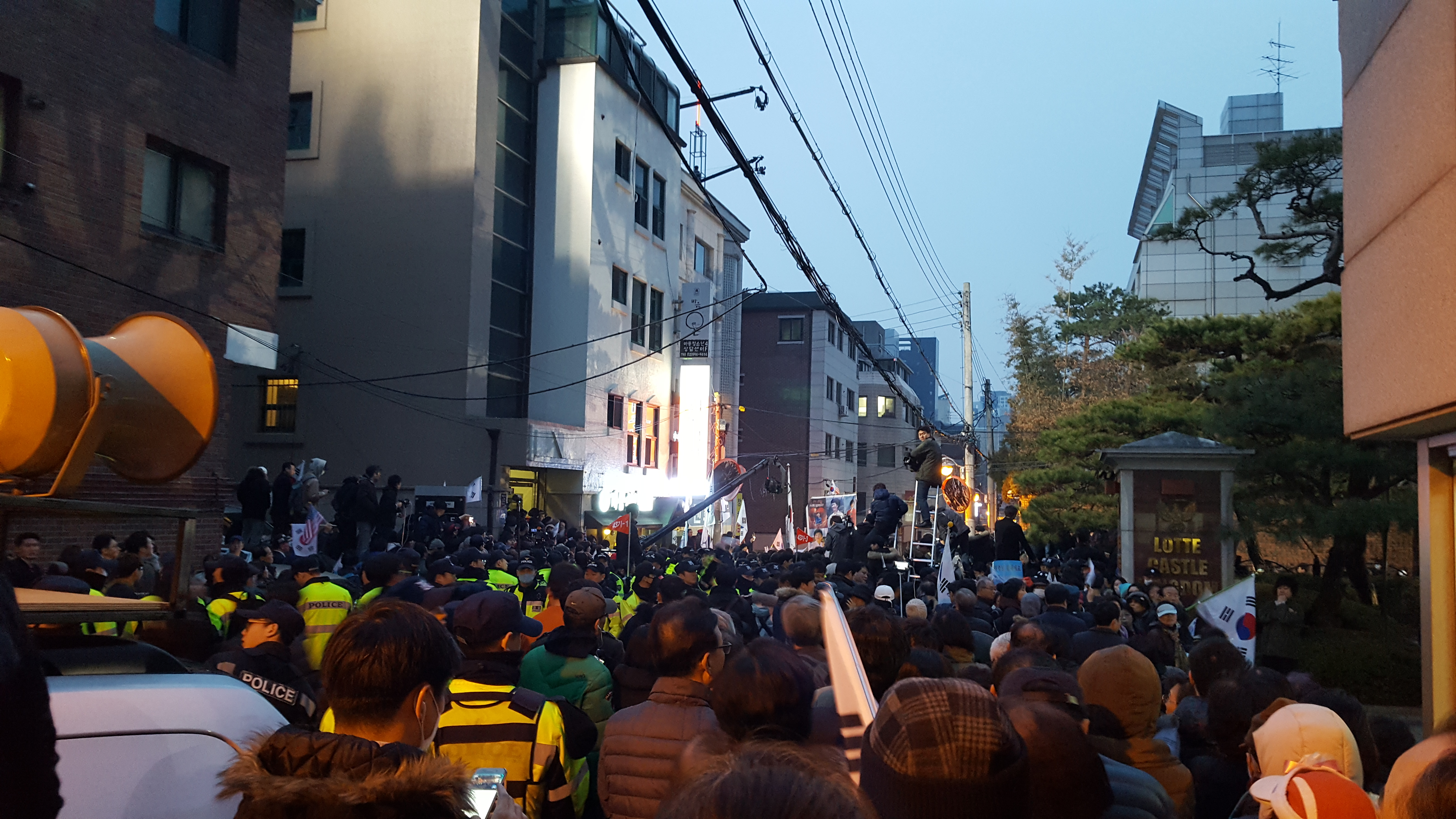
- Acting President of the Constitutional Court Lee Jung-mi announcing the court decision removing Park from office, 10 March 2017 Demonstrators and policemen outside of Park Geun-hye's house following her removal from office
- Accused: Park Geun-hye (President of South Korea)
- Proponents: Woo Sang-ho, Park Jie-won, Roh Hoe-chan
- Date: 9 December 2016 – 10 March 2017
- Outcome: Convicted by the Constitutional Court of Korea, removed from office; Snap presidential election was held in May 2017; Moon Jae-in elected as president
- Charges: Abuse of power, coercion
- Cause: Political scandal

Impeachment vote by National Assembly (9 December 2016)
- Votes in favor: 234 / 300 (78%)
- Votes against: 56 / 300 (18.7%)
- Present: 2 (0.7%)
- Not voting: 1 (0.3%) (7 votes invalid)
- Result: Impeachment successful: Park's presidential powers and duties are suspended for the duration of the impeachment trial; Prime Minister Hwang Kyo-ahn assumes presidential powers and duties as acting president

Decision by Constitutional Court of Korea (10 March 2017)
- Votes in favor: 8 / 8
- Votes against: 0 / 8
- Result: Impeachment upheld; Park removed from office; Moon Jae-in elected president on 9 May 2017; Park sentenced to 24 years in prison on 6 April 2018 (Note: Pardoned on 24 December 2021.)
- National Assembly: 2004092; Constitutional Court: 2016헌나1

Immediate response to the decision of the Constitutional Court of Korea on 10 March 2017

On 9 December 2016, Park Geun-hye, the president of South Korea, was impeached as the culmination of a political scandal involving interventions to the presidency from her aide, Choi Soon-sil. 234 members of the 300-member National Assembly voted to impeach and temporarily suspend Park's presidential powers and duties. This exceeded the required two-thirds threshold in the National Assembly and, although the vote was by secret ballot, the results indicated that more than half of the 128 lawmakers in Park's party Saenuri had supported her impeachment. Thus, Hwang Kyo-ahn, then Prime Minister of South Korea, became acting president while the Constitutional Court of Korea was due to determine whether to accept the impeachment. The court upheld the impeachment in a unanimous 8–0 decision on 10 March 2017, removing Park from office. The regularly scheduled presidential election was advanced to 9 May 2017, and Moon Jae-in, former leader of the Democratic Party, who Park had narrowly defeated in the 2012 presidential election, was elected as Park's permanent successor.

Park was formally sentenced to 24 years in prison on 6 April 2018 after being found guilty of abuse of power and coercion. This was later raised to 25 years and a fine of ₩20 billion (US$17.86 million) following an appeal by prosecutors. President Moon would go on to pardon Park Geun-hye on compassionate grounds in December 2021. She was ultimately released and later returned home in March 2022. This was the first impeachment of a sitting South Korean president since the impeachment of Roh Moo-hyun of 12 March 2004, and the last until Yoon Suk Yeol's impeachment on 14 December 2024.

== Background ==
=== South Korean Constitution and Constitutional Court Act ===
The procedure for impeachment is set out in the 10th Constitution of South Korea in 1987. According to Article 65 Clause 1, if the president, prime minister, or other state council members violate the Constitution or other laws of official duty, the National Assembly can impeach them.

Clause 2 states the impeachment bill must be proposed by one third, and approved by a majority of members of the National Assembly for passage. In the case of the president, the motion must be proposed by a majority and approved by a supermajority of two thirds or more of the total members of the National Assembly, meaning that 200 of 300 members of the parliament must vote to approve the bill. This article also states that any person against whom a motion for impeachment has been passed shall be suspended from exercising his/her power until the impeachment has been adjudicated, and a decision on impeachment shall not extend further than removal from public office. However, impeachment shall not exempt the person impeached from civil or criminal liability for such violations.

After impeachment, the final decision on whether to remove the impeached from office rests with the Constitutional Court of Korea. By the Constitutional Court Act of 1988, the Constitutional Court must make a final decision within 180 days after it receives any case for adjudication, including impeachment cases. If the respondent has already left office before the pronouncement of the decision, the case is dismissed.

The last president to be subject to impeachment was Roh Moo-hyun, who was impeached by the National Assembly in 2004 and was suspended from duties for two months. In that case, the Constitutional Court acquitted Roh and restored him to power, with the South Korean public by and large in support of Roh.

=== Choi Soon-sil scandal ===
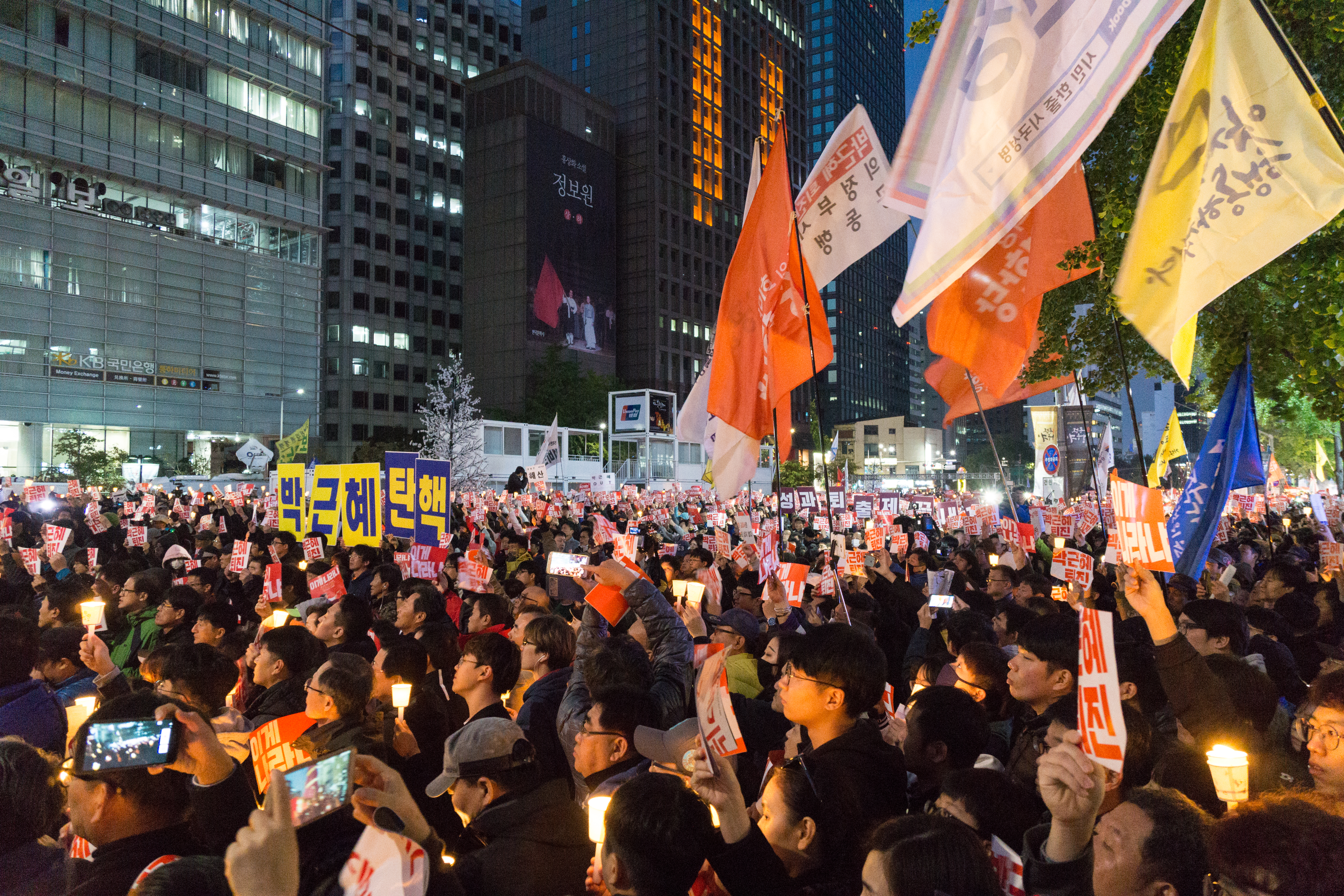
Protest against Park Geun-hye in Seoul, 29 October 2016

Revelations emerged in late October 2016 that President Park Geun-hye's aide, Choi Soon-sil, who did not have an official position in the government, had used her position to seek donations of money from several business conglomerates (known as chaebol), including Samsung, Hyundai, SK Group and Lotte, to two foundations she controlled. These revelations first came out when Park's unofficial clothier Ko Young-tae revealed evidence to the press of the nature of Park and Choi's relationship which suggested Choi's access to Park's personal and work life, and Choi was said to have directly influenced, and interfered with the policies of the Park government and to have edited Park's presidential speeches. Media investigations also reported that Choi and President Park's senior staff members, including both Ahn Jong-bum and Jeong Ho-sung, have allegedly used their influence to extort ₩77.4 billion ($60 million) from Korean chaebols—family-owned large business conglomerates—and set up two culture- and sports-related foundations, Mir and K-sports foundations.

On 25 October 2016, Park apologized to the nation in a televised address from the Blue House for giving Choi access to draft speeches during the first months of her presidency. Protests began on 26 October calling on President Park's resignation. Three days later, she dismissed her top aides including chief of staff Kim Ki-choon and two members of the cabinet and attempted to replace prime minister Hwang Kyo-ahn with Kim Byong-joon, a former aide to former president Roh Moo-hyun, but this was rejected by the National Assembly.

On 31 October, Choi Soon-sil was arrested by prosecutors, having concluded that there was enough evidence for an indictment. She was formally charged with abuse of power and fraud on 20 November.

Park made a second apology on 4 November, pledging to take responsibility if she was found guilty, and a third apology on 29 November, calling for the National Assembly to decide the manner of her departure, but this was rejected by the opposition-controlled legislature. Protests across South Korea began on 26 October with Park's approval rating dropping to 4%, and according to an opinion poll, as of 9 December 78% of South Koreans supported her impeachment. President Park appointed Park Young-soo, former head of the Seoul High Prosecutors' Office, as a special prosecutor to investigate the allegations on 30 November.

Choi's daughter Chung Yoo-ra was also sought by prosecutors as a key witness. When she did not return to Korea for the investigation, an Interpol warrant was put out for her arrest. She was arrested in Denmark on 1 January 2017, and extradited to Korea in May. In late 2016 and early 2017, the German Federal Police began investigating Choi and Chung for money laundering.

The response to the Sewol ferry sinking accident that occurred on 16 April 2014 also contributed to Park's declining presidential ratings.

== Political developments ==
On 3 December 2016, at 4:10 a.m., Woo Sang-ho of the Democratic Party, Park Jie-won of the People's Party, and Roh Hoe-chan of the Justice Party moved the "President (Park Geun-hye) impeachment proposal" in the National Assembly on behalf of 171 members of their respective parties and other independent representatives, on the grounds that Geun-hye had violated the Constitution and the law. Park's Saenuri Party initially preferred Park to voluntarily step down in late April, but with mounting protests, the ruling party became divided on whether Park should step down voluntarily or be impeached. On 4 December, members of Saenuri's "non-mainstream" factions declared that they would vote in favour of Park's impeachment.

The 300-member National Assembly was scheduled to vote on an impeachment bill on 9 December, at the end of the legislative session. As impeachment against president requires a two-thirds supermajority, at least 200 members would have to vote to impeach, in which case Park would be impeached and immediately suspended from her office. There were up to 172 opposition and independent lawmakers, which meant at least 28 of the 128 MPs from the ruling Saenuri Party needed to cross the floor and join the opposition in supporting the impeachment measure for the vote to pass.

== Legislative motion ==
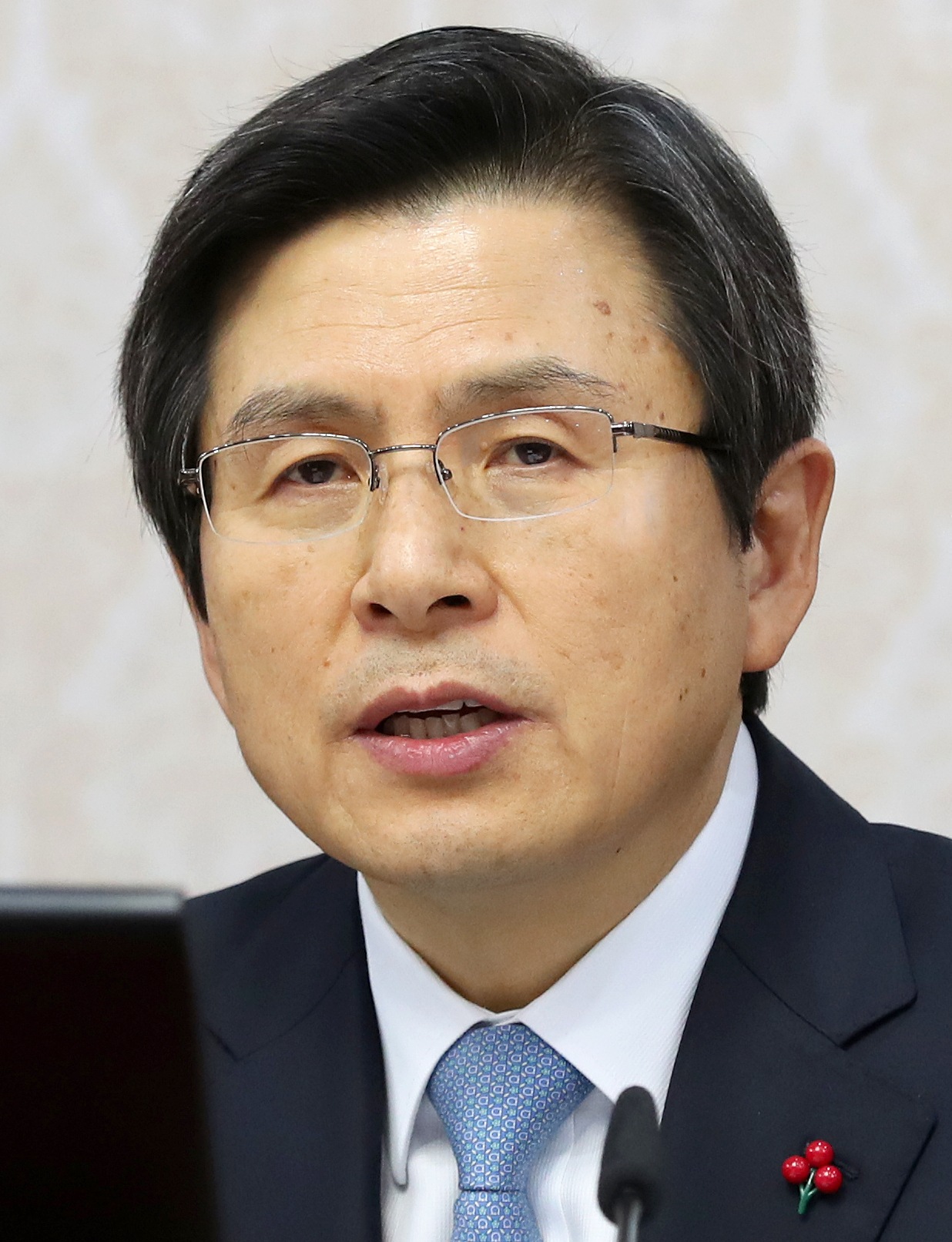
Prime Minister and Acting President Hwang Kyo-ahn at his first Cabinet meeting just after the passage of the impeachment motion in National Assembly

On 8 December, the South Korean National Assembly announced that the vote on the motion to impeach would take place on 9 December, at 3:00 p.m. local time. The opposition parties pledged to resign their seats in the National Assembly if the impeachment motion failed to pass. On 9 December, the National Assembly approved the impeachment motion by a vote of 234 in favour and 56 against in a secret ballot. The Speaker of the National Assembly (who happens to be unaffiliated with any party) abstained from the vote. Two other MPs abstained from voting and seven votes were declared invalid.

9 December 2016
National Assembly Motion to impeach the President (Park Geun-hye)
Two-thirds majority (200/300) required
| Choice | Votes |
|---|---|
| Yes | 234 / 300 (78%) |
| No | 56 / 300 (18.7%) |
| Abstention | 2 / 300 (0.7%) |
| Invalid votes | 7 / 300 (2.3%) |
| Did not vote | 1 / 300 (0.3%) |

As a result of the motion's passage, President Park's powers and duties were suspended for up to 180 days while the Constitutional Court of Korea considered the validity of the impeachment motion. It was necessary for six of the nine judges on that court to agree with the impeachment for the removal to take effect.

President Park held a final cabinet meeting acknowledging the impeachment motion and apologised for causing uncertainty, before Prime Minister Hwang Kyo-ahn assumed presidential powers and duties at 19:30 Korean Standard Time, on an interim basis.

=== Reactions ===
Protesters congregated outside the National Assembly hall where the voting session was held. Some 40 family members of the victims of the sinking of MV Sewol looked on as lawmakers cast their secret ballots. Citizens who have been rallying in massive numbers against Park rejoiced at the news, while Park's supporters called the parliamentary impeachment a "witch-hunt" without concrete evidence of Park's wrongdoings.

On 1 January 2017, Park appeared in public for the first time since the impeachment before a select group of reporters at the Blue House, saying she denied any allegations of the scandal and wrongdoings.

== Constitutional Court hearing and removal from office ==
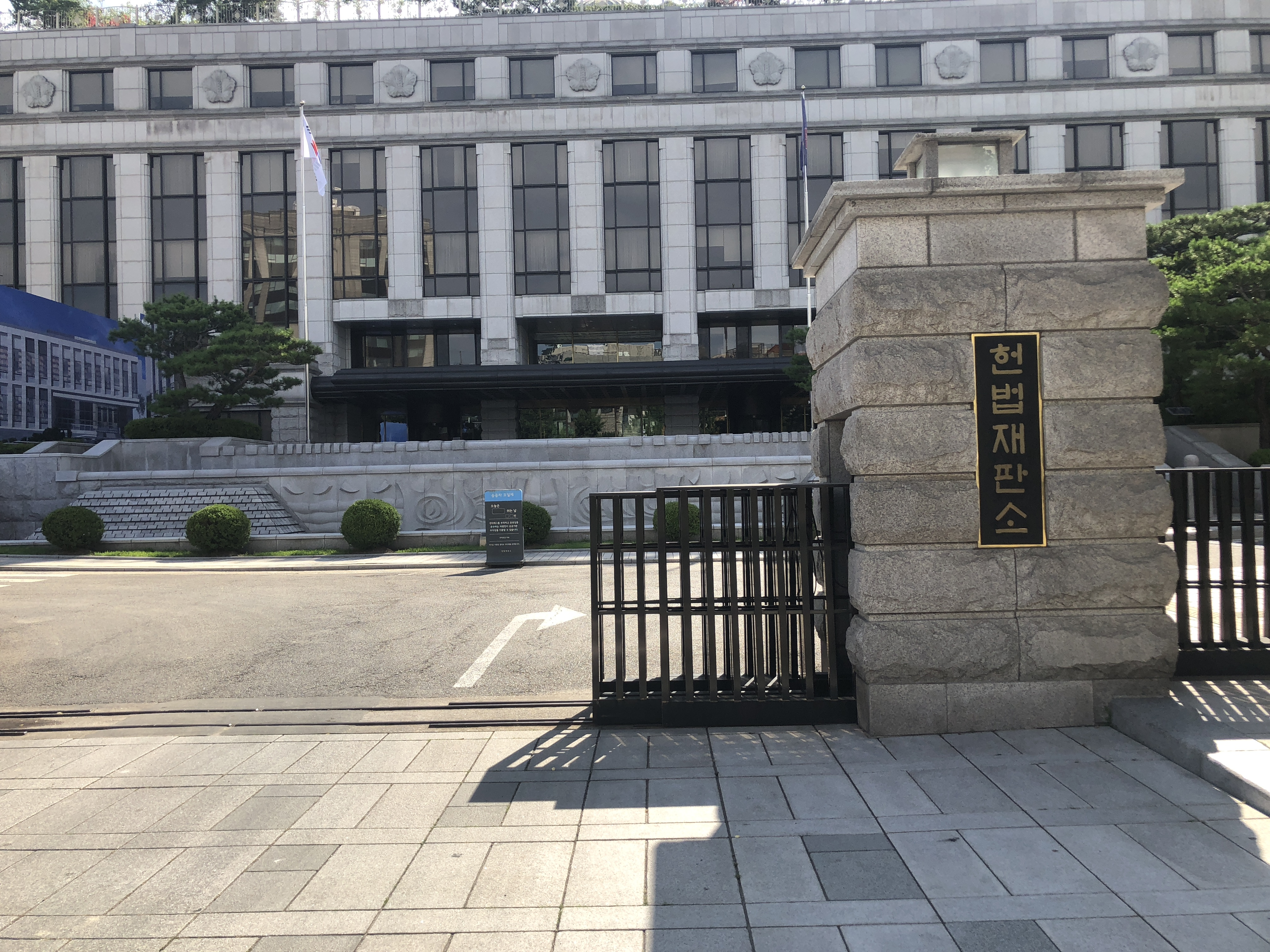
Constitutional Court building, where the judges made the impeachment decision

The South Korean Constitutional Court had up to 180 days (until early June 2017) to decide on the issue. It held public hearings to hear from both sides on whether the National Assembly had followed due process and the impeachment was justified. Under the Constitution, if the impeachment were upheld, new elections would have had to be held so a new president could take office by October 2017 at the latest.

The Constitutional Court had been considered generally conservative at the time, as all nine judges of the Constitutional Court were appointed during the conservative Lee Myung-bak and Park Geun-hye administrations. The Constitutional Court was to start the Preparatory Hearing on 22 December, with initial views from both sides. Yoon Suk Yeol greatly assisted the prosecution of Park before being himself impeached in 2024.

The first impeachment trial focused on the whereabouts of Park Geun-hye seven hours after the Sewol ferry sinking. The administration's delayed response to the disaster led to widespread criticism in South Korea and forced Park to deny various rumours. Then, on 23 December the Justice Ministry of South Korea said that it has submitted its views on the recent parliamentary vote to impeach President Park Geun-hye to the Constitutional Court, adding that the process has met all the necessary legal requirements.

The Constitutional Court was to officially start the main hearings on Tuesday, 3 January 2017, and Park would not be required to appear for questioning. Park was absent at the first open hearing and the first session was closed after just nine minutes. The hearings were rescheduled to start on 5 January 2017. The trial heard arguments and evidence until 27 February.

On 6 March, special prosecutor Park Young-soo announced the results of his probe into the Choi and Park allegations, finding evidence of collusion between Park and Choi to solicit bribes from Samsung Group and blacklisting more than 9,000 artists, authors, and movie industry professionals from government assistance, constituting an abuse of power. This opened the possibility of Park's indictment if the Constitutional Court upheld the National Assembly's impeachment motion, which it ultimately did.

=== Verdict ===
English translation of the Constitutional Court ruling The full text of Case on the Impeachment of the President (Park Geun-hye) (Summary) at Wikisource

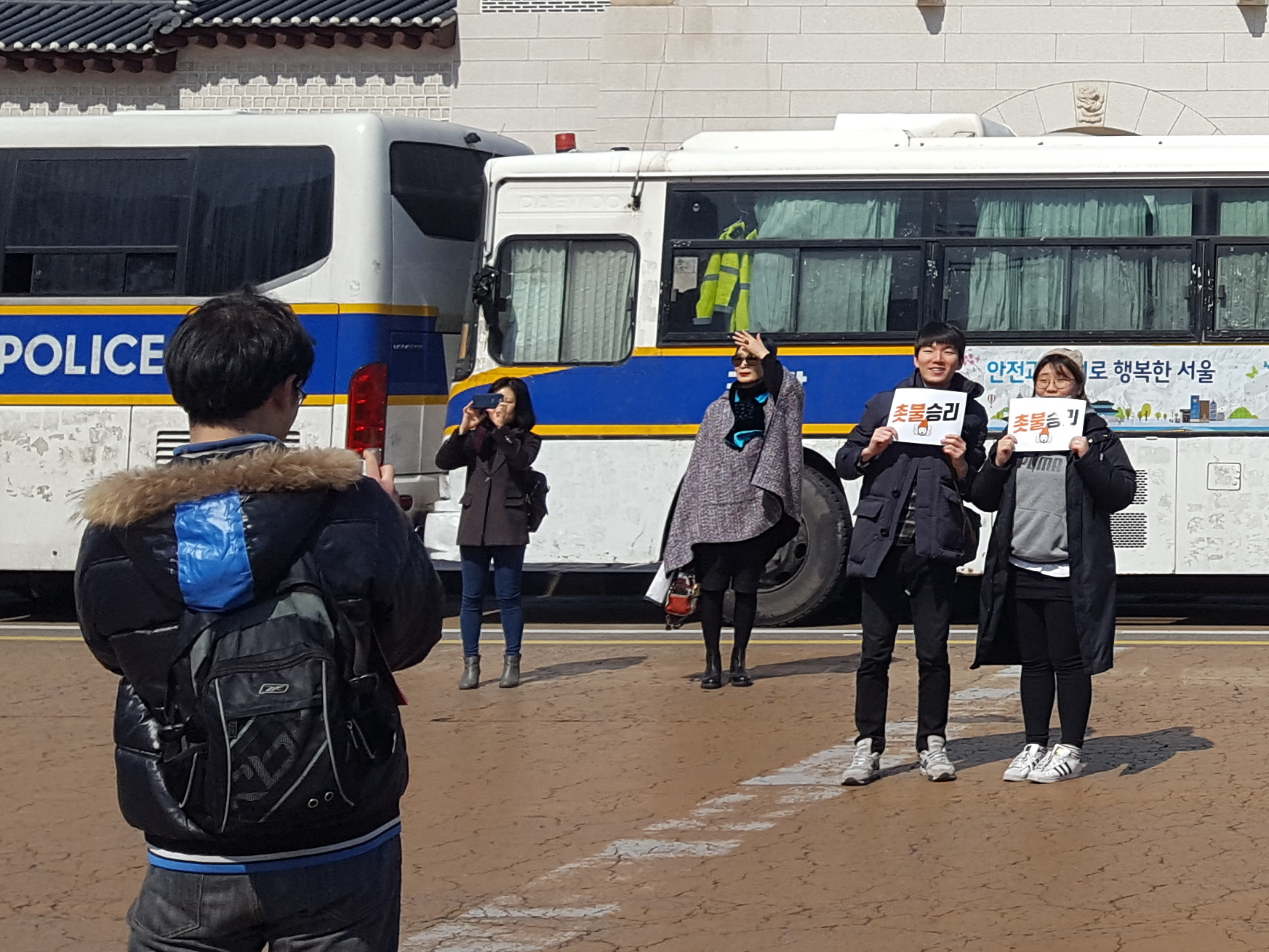
People holding signs saying "Candlelight's Victory" in Gwanghwamun immediately after the verdict

On 10 March 2017, 11.00 am KST, the Constitutional Court upheld the impeachment in a unanimous 8–0 decision read out by Acting Chief Justice Lee Jung Mi, formally ending Park's presidency. The court found that Park broke the law by allowing Choi a role in state matters, and disregarded guidelines on state secrets by leaking several documents. According to the ruling, Park's actions "seriously impaired the spirit of...democracy and the rule of law." This marked the first time that a sitting president was removed from the office since the creation of the Sixth Republic of South Korea after the country's democratization in 1987. Both supporters and opponents of Park had gathered outside the Constitutional Court building for the verdict. Three died and dozens were injured as a result of the ensuing clashes between her supporters and police.

== Aftermath ==
As a result of impeachment, Park was stripped of her post-presidential benefits such as retirement pension, free medical services, state funding for her post-retirement office, personal assistants and a chauffeur, and right to burial at the Seoul National Cemetery after death. However, she is entitled to retain security protection under the Presidential Security Act.

Park left the Blue House on the evening of 11 March and was welcomed to her home by supporters. She was arrested and placed into custody after an indictment by prosecutors on charges of bribery, abuse of power, coercion, and leaking government secrets on 31 March.

After Park's removal from office, Prime Minister Hwang remained as Acting President. A presidential election was already scheduled for December 2017. However, it was advanced to 9 May 2017, as the constitution requires new elections within 60 days of a permanent presidential vacancy. In that election, Moon Jae-in was elected as the 12th president of South Korea.

=== Plans for a potential military response to protests ===
In July 2018, it emerged that the Defense Security Command made plans for declaring martial law and authority to use military force to crackdown on protesters, if the Constitutional Court did not uphold Park's removal from office. The DSC had planned to mobilize 200 tanks, 550 armoured vehicles, 4,800 armed personnel, and 1,400 members of special forces in Seoul in order to enforce martial law. Other components of the plan included monitoring and censoring media content and arresting politicians taking part in protests.

=== Sentencing ===
On 6 April 2018, Park was sentenced to 24 years in prison, after being found guilty of abuse of power and coercion. This was later raised to 25 years and a fine of ₩20 billion (US$17.86 million) following an appeal by prosecutors. She was pardoned in December 2021.

== See also ==
- Roh Moo-hyun § Bribery allegations
- Lee Myung-bak § Conviction and sentence
  - BBK stock price manipulation incident
- Impeachment of Yoon Suk Yeol
