= 2012 NIS public opinion manipulation scandal =

Korean political scandal

The 2012 NIS public opinion manipulation scandal saw members of the National Intelligence Service (NIS) of South Korea accused of interfering in the 2012 South Korean presidential election. First, an agent of the National Intelligence Service (NIS) was alleged to have manipulated public opinion to help Park Geun-hye's presidential election under the command of the NIS. Second, the director of the agency commanded an NIS agent to manipulate public opinion. Suspicions were raised before the election, but were not verified until afterwards.

On April 30, prosecutors raided the headquarters of the South Korean National Intelligence Service. On June 12, the head of the NIS, Won Sei-hoon and the head of the Seoul Metropolitan Police Agency Kim Yong-pan were prosecuted for interfering in the election. In 2015, the Supreme Court acquitted Kim of charges of abusing his power to manipulate the investigation. In 2016, a prosecutors' investigation had turned up evidence that the NIS had effectively been orchestrating the activities of conservative groups since the administration of former president Lee Myung-bak (2008–2013). The evidence shows that the NIS has been involved not only in political advertisements that conservative groups have run in newspapers but also in their plans to hold one-person protests and to hand out pamphlets. "An agent surnamed Park who was on the NIS's psychological warfare team supported and supervised right-wing conservative organizations and right-wing youth organizations."

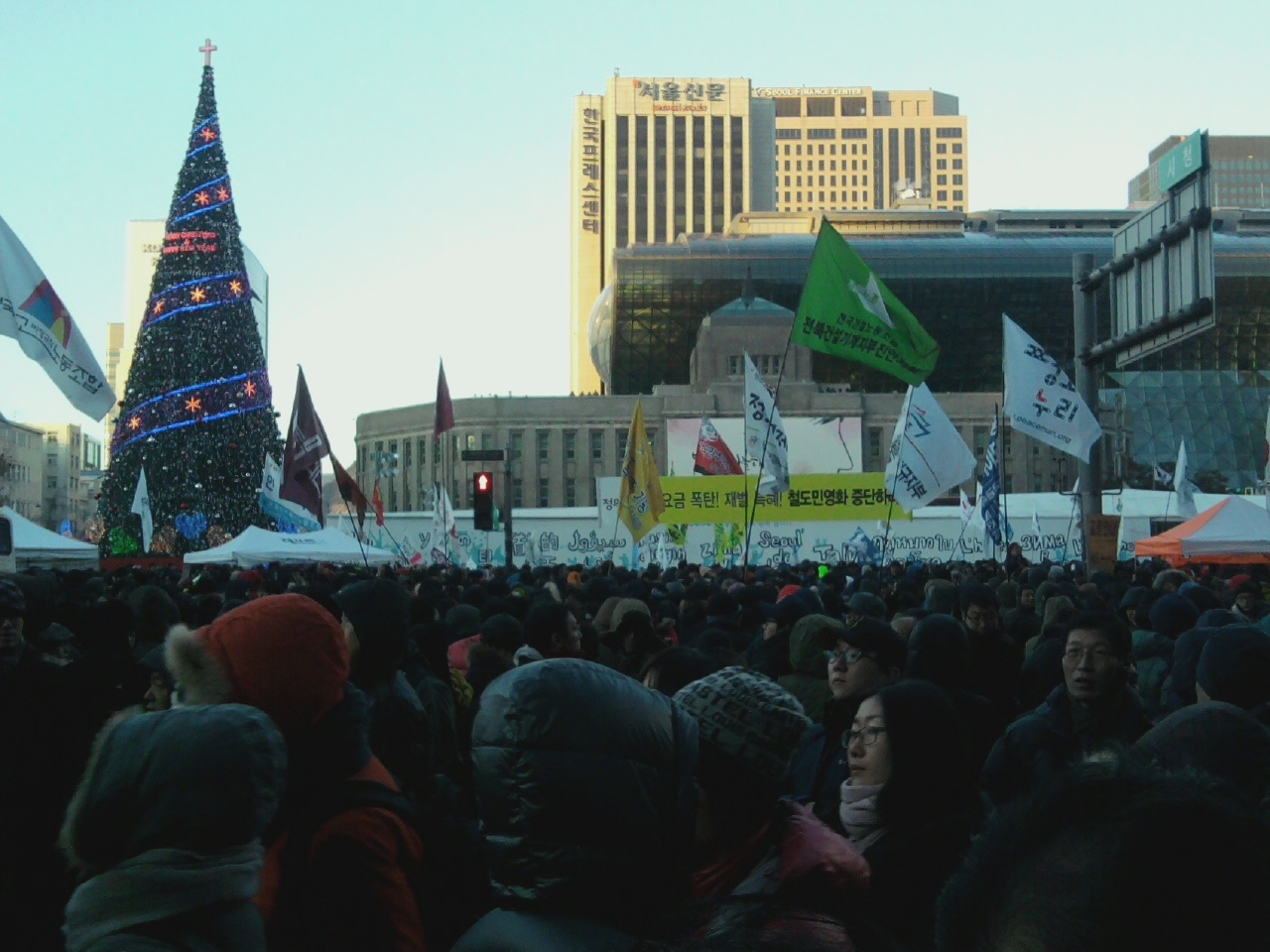
December 28, 2013, Korean Confederation of Trade Unions General Strike.

== Aftermath ==
In 2013, prosecutor Yoon Suk Yeol led a special investigation team that looked into the National Intelligence Service (NIS)'s involvement in the scandal. Yoon sought the prosecution of the former head of the NIS, Won Sei-hoon, for violating the Public Official Election Act for his role in the case. Yoon accused Park Geun-hye's Justice Minister Hwang Kyo-ahn of influencing his investigation. The I'm Not Fine Movement also happened in the aftermath in 2013–14. In February 2015, Won was convicted on charges of instructing NIS officials to manipulate internet comments and sentenced to three years in prison. However, the conviction was overturned on appeal, leading to a retrial. In a second trial, Won was sentenced to four years in prison in 2017. The Supreme Court upheld the sentence in April 2018. When Moon Jae-in won the 2017 election, his administration pursued nine additional charges of political interference against Won, resulting in a subsequent 7 year jail sentence in 2020.

In August 2017, the NIS formally acknowledged that it was involved in the election manipulation after an internal inquiry. In December 2020, the National Assembly passed reforms curbing the powers of the NIS, explicitly banning the agency and its employees from interfering in domestic politics.

== See also ==
- Todayhumor
- 2016 South Korean protests
- Choi Soon-sil gate
- List of protests in the 21st century
