= Nuclear Safety and Security Commission =

- 원자력안전위원회

Agency overview
- Formed: October 26, 2011; 14 years ago
- Jurisdiction: Government of South Korea
- Headquarters: Seoul, South Korea
- Agency executive: Yoo Guk-hee, Chairperson
- Website: www.nssc.go.kr

Korean name
- Hangul: 원자력안전위원회
- Hanja: 原子力安全委員會
- RR: Wonjaryeok anjeon wiwonhoe
- MR: Wŏnjaryŏk anjŏn wiwŏnhoe

The Nuclear Safety and Security Commission (NSSC; Korean: 원자력안전위원회) is one of the nuclear organizations in South Korea and is run under the Prime Minister's Office. The headquarters are in Jongno District, Seoul.

The NSSC was established on October 26, 2011, to bolster nuclear safety amid widespread public fears after the Fukushima Daiichi disaster in March and several incidents at Korean reactors.

== Organization ==
The organization is so small that there is only one position under the direction of the president, the director general; the secretary general (member of the standing committee of the Nuclear Security Committee).

- Chair (Deputy Minister level)
  - Secretary-General (Deputy Chair of the NSSC)
    - Audit investigation officer
    - Operational Support Division
  - Planning Coordinator [Level I]
    - Planning and Finance Officer
    - International Cooperation Officer
    - Security Communications Officer
    - Innovation Data Administration Team
    - Security Policy Office [Level II]
    - Security Policy Division
    - Energy Security Division Award
    - Winner Exam Division
    - Safety Standards Division
    - Next Generation Reactor Safety Division
  - Radiological Disaster Prevention Office [level III]
    - Radiation Protection Division
    - Radiation Protection of Persons Division
    - Division of the Radioactive Waste Safety
    - Disaster Reduction Environment
    - Division of the Winner of the Force Control
    - Team of the Award-winning Food Safety

== See also ==
- Nuclear power in South Korea
- Anti-nuclear movement in South Korea
- Korea Hydro & Nuclear Power
- International Atomic Energy Agency
