= CNK International =

South Korean mining and animation company

- Native name: CNK 인터내셔널
- Romanized name: CNK Inteonaesyeoneol
- Formerly: KOKO (1990–1995); Koko Enterprises (1995–2011)
- Type: Public
- Traded as: KOSDAQ
- Industry: Food; Mining; Animation (formerly)
- Founded: March 10, 1990
- Founder: Myong Ok Jeon
- Headquarters: North Gyeongsang Province, South Korea
- Area served: South Korea; Cameroon
- Key people: Oh Deok-gyun (Chairman); Woo-Taek Kim (CEO); Kim Jin-Shik (Senior managing director)
- Products: Feed additives Gold mining Non-ferrous metals Non-ferrous minerals Pork
- Number of employees: 18
- Website: www.cnkinternational.co.kr

CNK International (Korean: CNK 인터내셔널) is a company located in South Korea that is primarily involved in the metals and mining industry. The company engages in the development of mineral resources projects with a focus on gold and diamond in Cameroon, Africa. The company also imports, processes, and sells gold and diamond in South Korea. CNK International was established as Koko Entertainment (Korean: 코코 엔터테인먼트), an animation studio founded by Myong Ok Jeon on March 2, 1990. The company's most recognized branding as a former animation studio was Koko Enterprises Ltd. (Korean: 기업 코코). The company originated in the Seocho District in Seoul, South Korea. The company is currently headquartered in the North Gyeongsang Province in South Korea.

In January 1994, the company went public, and in November 1994, Koko Entertainment merged with Pacific Rim Technologies with Koko Entertainment as the surviving company. In July 1995, the company's name was changed to Koko Enterprises Co, Ltd., and in February 2000, the company registered in the KOSDAQ securities market. In July 2001, Koko Enterprises acquired all the shares of Ani Content as a transfer of goodwill, and in July 2005, Koko Enterprises acquired Dongham Biotech Co., Ltd. In December 2007, they relocated their head offices to the Gangnam District in Seoul, and in December 2009, their offices were relocated to the Jongno District in Seoul.

In February 2011, the company re-branded itself as CNK International Co, Ltd., and in April 2011, the company abandoned the animation industry and entered into the mining industry, specifically non-ferrous metal mining. In November 2011, the company sold off all of its shares of its subsidiary Koko-best as part of a corporate re-structuring. In September 2014, the company ventured into further businesses including tests and research projects on agricultural land improvements, services for testing, research, surveying, design supervision, and extension for farming and fishing village maintenance projects and entering the food industry with restaurants. In November 2014, the company merged with Land Improvement Co., Ltd. with CNK International Co., Ltd. being the surviving company.

CNK International Co. was involved in the 2012 MOFAT Diamond Scandal, in which Kim Eun-seok, the then-energy-and-resources ambassador of Ministry of Foreign Affairs and Trade, was accused of insider trading and stock manipulation. Kim Eun-seok had shared nonpublic information with family members prior to a press release from the Ministry of Foreign Affairs that deliberately overstated the size of a Cameroon diamond mine. Kim's family members proceeded to buy shares of CNK International Co. Oh Deok-gyun, then-Chairman of CNK International Co., gained 80 billion Korean won by selling his own shares amid the scandal. CNK International Co. was delisted from Kosdaq in 2015 by a court ruling, which was appealed up to the South Korean Supreme Court. In January 2020, the Supreme Court upheld the lower court's ruling in favor of delisting CNK International Co., which is final. Former Chairman Oh was convicted of violating the Financial Investment Services and Capital Markets Act and sentenced to three years in prison and five years probation.

== Filmography ==
Koko has animated and provided ink and paint for the following series and movies:

- Batman: The Animated Series (1992–1995)
- Animaniacs (1993–1998)
- Gargoyles (1994–1997)
- Freakazoid! (1995–1997)
- The Sylvester & Tweety Mysteries (1995-2002)
- Lupin the 3rd: Farewell to Nostradamus (1995)
- Mighty Ducks: The Animated Series (1996–1997)
- Superman: The Animated Series (1996–2000)
- Lupin the 3rd: Dead or Alive (1996)
- Soul Frame Lazenca (1997–1998, co-produced with Seoul Movie)
- The New Batman Adventures (1997–1999)
- Men In Black: The Series (1997–2001)
- Hercules and Xena – The Animated Movie: The Battle for Mount Olympus (1998)
- Batman & Mr. Freeze: SubZero (1998, co-produced with Dong Yang Animation)
- Batman Beyond (1999–2001)
- Spider-Man Unlimited (1999–2001)
- Johnny Bravo (1999–2001)
- Justice League (2001–2004)
- Tom and Jerry: The Magic Ring (2001, co-produced with Seoul Movie; uncredited)
- Totally Spies (2002)
- Secret of Cerulean Sand (2002)
- Chae Chapong Kimchi Pong (2002, co-produced with Dong Woo Animation)
- Crayon Shin-chan (2003–2007)
- The Marshmallow Times (2004–2005, co-produced with Seoul Movie)
