= Seoul Sustainable Energy Action Plan =

Energy transition policy in South Korea

The second phase of the One Less Nuclear Power Plant initiative, “Seoul Sustainable Energy Action Plan” is the flagship energy policy put in place by the Seoul Metropolitan Government of the Republic of Korea. Seoul launched the second phase in August 2014 after its success with the first phase between April 2012 and June 2014.

== Overview ==
The One Less Nuclear Power Plant initiative, “Seoul Sustainable Energy Action Plan” is a local energy transition policy, which aims to reduce Seoul's reliance on nuclear power plants for electricity and to meet the city's energy needs for itself.

While the first phase of the initiative laid a foundation for renewable energy generation and civic-led energy conservation, the second phase seeks to achieve sustainability through changes in institutions and social structure, and thereby building an energy independent city where citizens produce as well as consume energy.

The target year is 2020 and Seoul expects to increase electricity self-reliance rate to 20%, cut greenhouse gas emissions by 10 million tons, and reduce energy use by 4 million TOE.

With 88 specific projects in four policy categories, Seoul is committed to fulfill three values of “energy self-reliance, sharing and participation” and share its best practices with other cities both at home and abroad.

== Core values ==
=== Energy independence ===
Seoul aims to ensure sustainable energy production in case of a failure in energy supply and reducing its dependence on energy supplied outside the city.

=== Energy-sharing ===
The value of energy-sharing is about sharing energy and resources with vulnerable people and future generations, as well as seeking a way to cooperate with other regions that have an advantage in wind power or other natural resources.

=== Energy participation ===
The value of energy participation is about establishing open energy governance where citizens take the lead in policy deliberation, development and implementation. By disclosing energy information and policies, Seoul will make it easier for citizens to participate in energy generation, energy efficiency improvement and energy-saving.

== Key directions ==
=== Decentralized energy generation ===
Ten million citizens will be the consumers and producers of energy to decentralize the city's power generation. Core projects include promoting mini PV panels easily installable on apartment balconies, establishing a civic fund for expansion of PV power generation, and requiring new buildings to generate energy, amounting up to 20% of their energy consumption, from renewable sources and decentralized system.

=== Efficient and low energy consumption ===
In order for efficient and low energy consumption to become the norm in society, Seoul will offer customized consulting service for building energy performance, improve the green building design standards, disclose information on building energy efficiency, and increase the variety of incentives given under the Eco-Mileage Program.

=== Innovation and energy jobs ===
Sustainable employment will be generated by Seoul's enhanced focus on the energy industry and innovation. Seoul will support the local energy service industry and foster ICT electricity technologies including Building Energy Management System (BEMS) favorable to large cities and smart grids. Seoul will also foster social enterprises and cooperatives in the field of green energy. An energy hub center will be built in each district to provide support for installation, monitoring and postal service, which in turn will provide more jobs for the society.

=== Energy-sharing community ===
Seoul will institutionalize the basic energy rights of all citizens to protect especially, the energy poor. To encourage continued and voluntary civic participation in energy generation, efficiency and saving, Seoul will focus on expanding local energy communities like the Energy Independent Communities.

== 10 Key Action Plans ==
① Expansion of photovoltaic power generation by citizens through financial support for 40,000 PV panels
② Expansion of buildings’ mandatory generation of renewable and decentralized energy from 12% to 20%
③ Full disclosure of information on energy consumption by buildings and expansion of energy performance diagnosis
④ Replacement of all traditional public light bulbs such as street and security lights with LED bulbs
⑤ Introduction of Driving-Mileage Program to incentivize less driving
⑥ Creation of jobs in the energy service sector through measures like establishing 25 energy hub centers
⑦ Promotion of innovative technologies such as BEMS and smart grids
⑧ Job creation for the elderly and expansion of recycling through community-based recycling
⑨ Eradication of energy poverty through provision of LED bulbs to 120,000 low-income households and support for BRP for 150 welfare facilities
⑩ Establishment local energy governance

== Brand identity ==
The font used for the BI for phase 1 of the One Less Nuclear Power Plant was kept to represent the continuity of the first phase and the second phase. The BI for the second phase does not have any edges to give friendly impression and to facilitate the BI's application.

== Slogans ==
- (Main) The people are our energy.
- (Overall) Citizens save energy, energy saves citizens.
- (Production) Seoul meets its energy needs for itself.
- (Efficiency•Saving) Efficient use of energy is a way of energy production.
- (Industry•Job) The bigger the industry, the better the energy.
- (Community•Welfare) Seoul ensures energy welfare for all.
