= I'm Not Fine Movement =

2013–2014 protest in South Korea

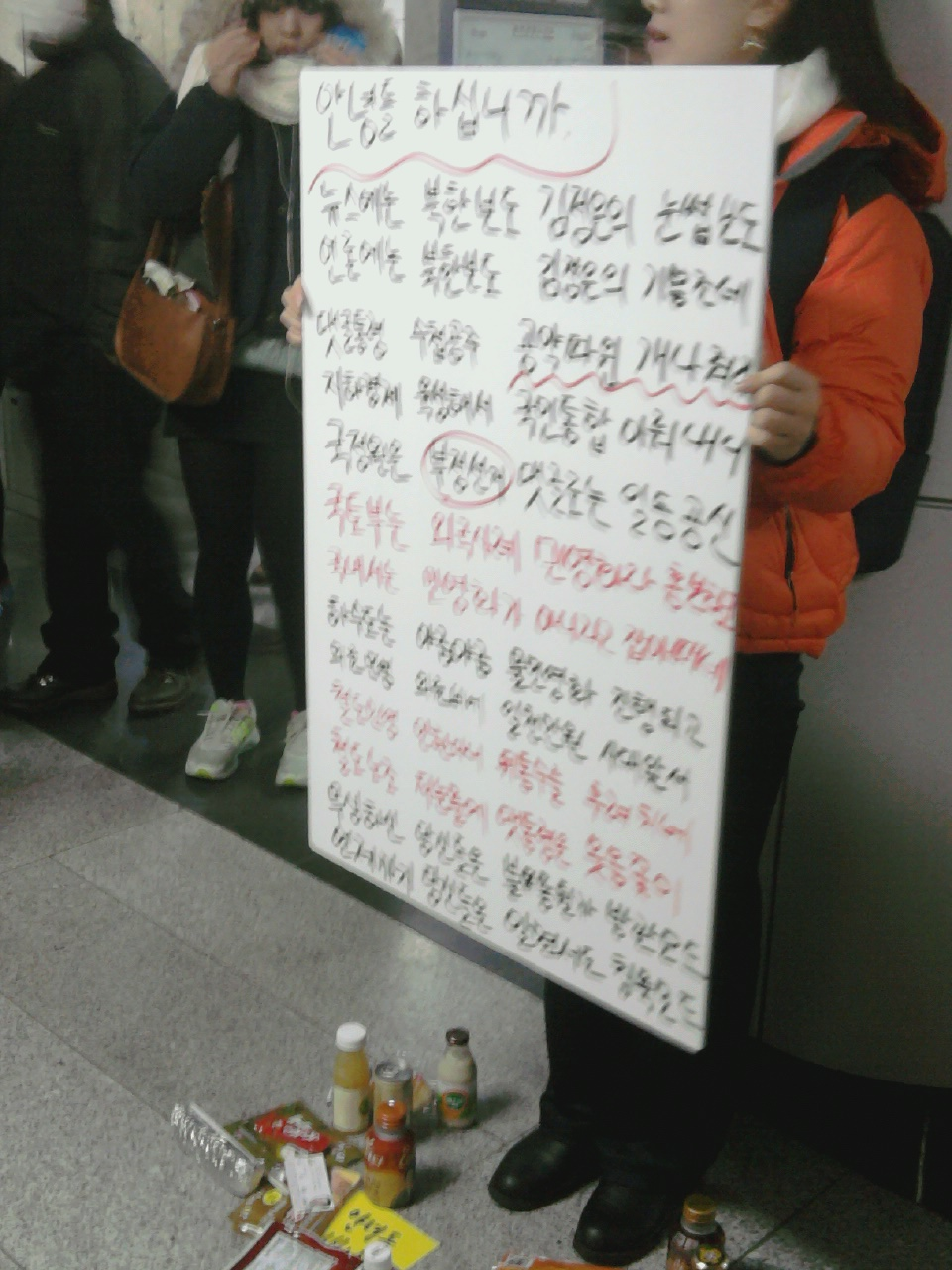
I'm Not Fine protester, 2013

The I'm Not Fine Movement (Korean: 안녕들하십니까), or How Are You Doing Movement, was a social movement in South Korea that emerged in December 2013 and lasted for several months. It began with a handwritten poster publicly displayed near the rear gate of Korea University's College of Political Science and Economics. The poster, titled How are you all doing these days?, was created by Ju Hyun-woo, a business school student and Labor Party member, and was put up on 10 December 2013.

In the poster, Ju criticized social and political injustices in South Korea, questioning whether people can truly be "fine" in such circumstances. The poster highlighted several issues: the dismissal of over 4,200 railway workers for opposing privatization, the erosion of workers' rights, suppression of dissent, and government corruption such as the 2012 NIS public opinion manipulation scandal. The author pointed to systemic inequalities, such as punishments for protesting corporate greed, the rise of precarious employment, and the exploitation of younger generations. He argued that societal indifference has been inculcated into the post-IMF crisis generation, which was never encouraged to think critically or voice concerns. Ju concludes by asking readers if they are truly "fine" and challenged them to speak out if they are not.

Within days, the movement gained traction as students from various universities responded by creating and displaying their own handwritten posters, sparking a broader conversation on social and political issues.
