= DDoS attacks during the October 2011 South Korean by-election =

The DDoS attacks during the October 2011 South Korean by-election were allegedly two separate distributed denial-of-service (DDoS) attacks that occurred on October 26, 2011. The attacks, which took place during the October 2011 Seoul mayoral by-election, targeted the websites of the National Election Commission (NEC) and then-mayoral candidate Park Won-soon. Investigators assert that the attacks were carried out in hopes of suppressing young voters, to the benefit of the Grand National Party. An aide of Grand National Party legislator Choi Gu-sik was found responsible for the attacks.

== The attacks ==
The attacks consisted of two separate denial-of-service attacks against independent National Election Commission and mayoral candidate Park Won-soon, carried out with the help of a botnet of 200 infected computers. The attacks were conducted during the morning, when citizens—particularly young voters looking to vote before work—would have been expected to look up polling station locations. It has been theorized that the attacks were conducted in the belief that they may reduce voter turnout, to the benefit of the Grand National Party's candidate Na Kyung-won. Police stated that the attack against the NEC lasted about two hours, specifically impacting the part of the website with information on polling locations; Park Won-soon's website was attacked twice that day.

The National Police Agency later revealed that an aide to Grand National Part lawmaker Choi Gu-sik, referred to in the media by only their surname "Gong," was responsible for the two attacks. The National Police Agency later arrested Gong and four other associates.

Some researchers, however, have questioned the official narrative. Doubts have been raised as to whether Gong had the technical expertise or resources to pull off the attack. Others have pointed out that under a DDoS attack, it would be unusual for parts of a website to be offline while others are online, suggesting perhaps a technical failure instead.

These events caused a collective panic amongst GNP members as they often denounce the online activities of South Korean progressives.

== Political impact ==
The exposure of his role in the attacks led to Choi Gu-sik officially resigning his position as a lawmaker, along with several other members of the GNP.

In the wake of the scandal, reformists in the conservative Grand National Party put pressure on core members of the party who were closely affiliated with the Lee Myung-bak government; this in turn led to Park Geun-hye being brought back into the spotlight to reorganize the GNP.

== Social impact ==
More than 30 university student associations made a joint statement calling for a thorough investigation of the attacks.

== See also ==
- 2008 Grand National Party Convention Bribery Incident
- Lee Myung-bak government
