= Grand National Party Convention bribery incident =

Political Scandal in South Korean Politics

The 2008 Grand National Party Convention is a political scandal in South Korean politics that exposed higher-level political corruption within the ranks of the Lee Myung-bak government. The connections surrounding the Lee Myung-bak government have also affected the performance of the Grand National Party. A GNP lawmaker, Koh Seung-duk, was instrumental in exposing it by reporting his knowledge about the corruption incident to the Seoul Central District Prosecutors' Office.

== Development of the investigation ==
At first, the SPO raided the house of a former aide to Park Hee-tae, Koh Myung-jin. Later, the SPO also detained the key campaigner for Park Hee-tae, Ahn Byung-yong, for delivering money to other party members during the 2008 legislative election.

== See also ==
- Corruption in South Korea
- DDoS attacks during the October 2011 South Korean by-election
- Prime Minister's Office Civilian Surveillance Incident
- Lee Myung-bak government
