= 2016 South Korean political scandal =

President Park Geun-hye corruption scandal

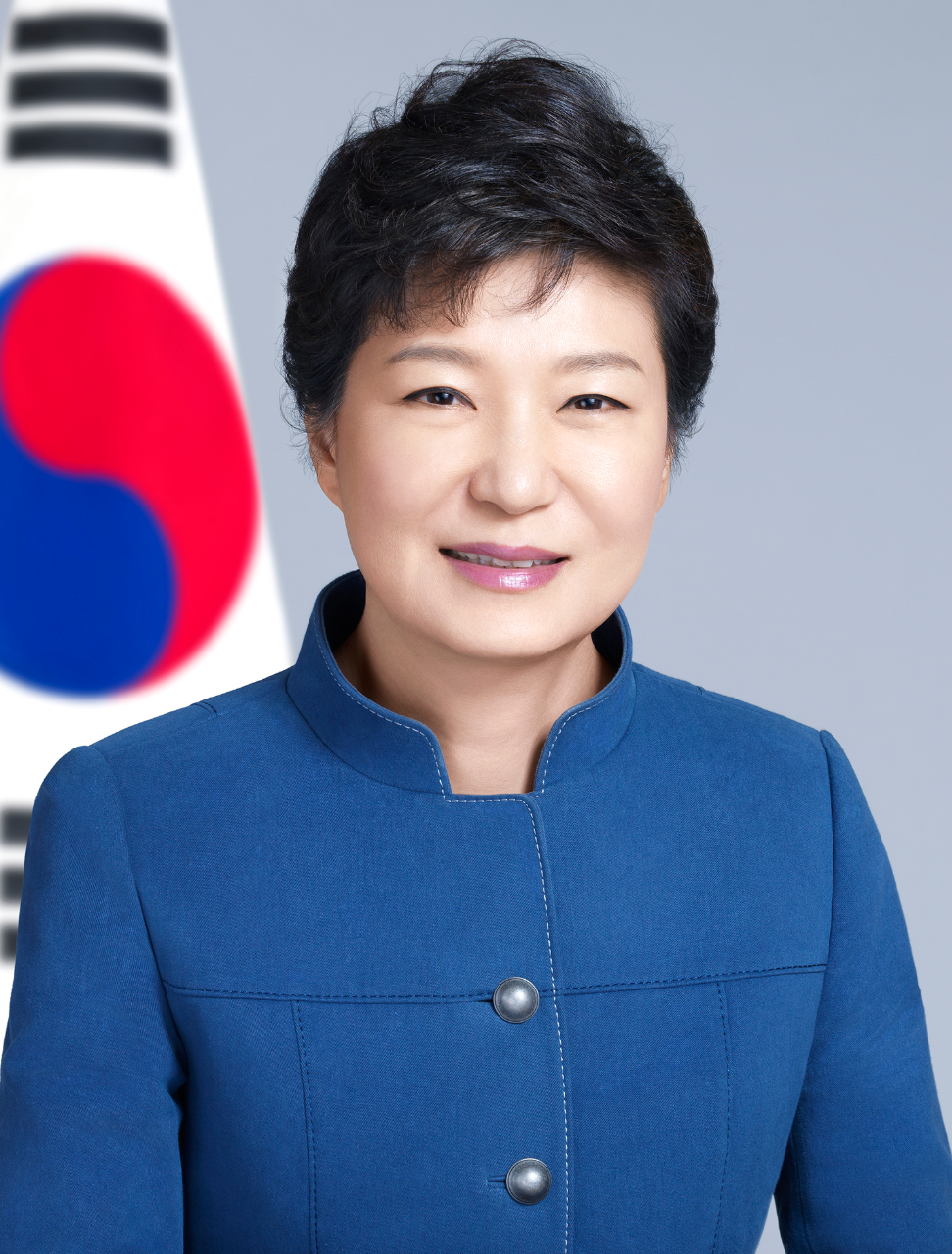
Park Geun-hye (pictured in 2013) was accused of being improperly influenced by Choi Soon-sil

The 2016 South Korean political scandal, often called Park Geun-hye–Choi Soon-sil Gate in South Korea (Korean: 박근혜·최순실 게이트), was a scandal that emerged around October 2016 in relation to the unusual access that Choi Soon-sil, the daughter of shaman-esque cult leader Choi Tae-min, had to President Park Geun-hye of South Korea.

Widespread coverage of this South Korean political scandal began in late October 2016. On 29 November, Park offered to begin the process of removing herself from power. On 9 December, Park was impeached, and then-prime minister Hwang Kyo-ahn became the acting president. On 21 December, a Special Prosecution Team led by Park Young Soo began to investigate the scandal. On 10 March 2017, the Constitutional Court of Korea ruled to uphold the impeachment of President Park Geun-Hye. All eight judges agreed that President Park abused her power, and removed her from office. A new election was held sixty days afterwards, which resulted in the victory of Democratic Party candidate Moon Jae-in. Moon won 41% of the popular vote in the election. The scandal caused the first impeachment of a sitting South Korean president since the impeachment of Roh Moo-hyun on 12 March 2004, and the last until Yoon Suk Yeol's impeachment on 14 December 2024.

== Background ==
=== Choi Soon-sil ===
Choi Soon-sil had known President Park Geun-hye since 1974, when Choi's father, Choi Tae-min, offered to counsel and advise Park as she and her family were grieving after the assassination of Park's mother, then-first lady Yuk Young-soo. In 2007, a South Korean news magazine publicized a thirty-year-old Korean Central Intelligence Agency report, revealing that Choi Tae-min initially approached Park by telling her that the deceased Yuk had appeared to him in his dreams, asking him to help her daughter. A leaked diplomatic cable from the U.S. embassy in Seoul reported subsequent rumors that Choi was a "Korean Rasputin" who "had complete control over Park's body and soul during her formative years and...his children accumulated enormous wealth as a result." In response to this scrutiny, Park called Choi Tae-min a "patriot" and stated she was grateful for his counsel and comfort during "difficult times."

In late 2016, reports surfaced that raised questions that Choi Soon-sil had inappropriate access to, and possible influence over, Park. Choi had allegedly been given regular reports on Park's schedule, speeches, and personnel arrangements, and had even seen classified information on secret meetings with North Korea. Choi was also alleged to have dictated, or at the least influenced, Park's decision-making on everything from her choice of handbags, to public statements, to state affairs.

Choi was also alleged to have used a South Korean overseas development assistance project (a convention center in Myanmar) for improper personal benefits.

Choi was indicted for extorting bribes, abusing power illegally and leaking classified documents and also accused of having influenced Ewha Womans University to change their admission criteria in order for her daughter Chung Yoo-ra to be given a place there.

=== Censorship and early reporting ===
The Park administration sought to influence the media in various ways, including through business ties with media executives, and had established a commission to harass and prosecute social media critics, including those who held her accountable for the handling of the 2014 sinking of MV Sewol, in which 304 civilians died. Choi's name had been completely obscured from public records through a variety of means. In July 2016, Park's illegal business ties to Choi Soon-sil were uncovered by a reporter working for Chosun Broadcasting Company, who cornered Choi and attempted to secure an interview, but his report was spiked by executives at the company. In September, more cautious stories were printed by newspapers, alluding to Park's shady business deals, and on 20 September, The Hankyoreh was able to independently uncover Choi's name by interviewing employees at a massage parlor. The managing editor of The Hankyoreh published a public appeal for Chosun Broadcasting Company to air the spiked story. Following this story, the investigation of Choi deepened, but her exact relationship with Park was still unclear.

== Discovery of Choi Soon-sil's tablet computer ==
Reporters covering the story for JTBC Newsroom located a rental office in Germany which had previously been temporarily used by Choi. There, they retrieved a Samsung tablet computer which contained her login information. They found that Choi had received drafts of 44 presidential speeches on the tablet before she abandoned it. One of the most troubling of these was a Microsoft Word document which contained a corrected draft of a speech made by Park in Germany on 28 March 2014. To avoid plausible deniability by Park, they initially reported on 19 October that anonymous sources had rumored Choi was editing Park's speeches. Once Park responded by denying that any of her speeches had been sent to private individuals, JTBC publicized their possession of the tablet on 24 October. The following morning, Park admitted that Choi had been acting as her unofficial, unpaid personal assistant.

The coverage of Choi subsequently spread to all media. Media outlets reported that Choi and Park's senior staff members, including both Ahn Jong-bum and Jeong Ho-sung, have allegedly used their influence to extort ₩77.4 billion (US$60 million) from Korean chaebols—family-owned large business conglomerates—and set up two cultural and sports-related foundations, Mir and K-sports foundations. National fencer Ko Young-tae, who was a close friend of Choi Soon-sil, is suspected of being involved in the management of shell corporations The Blue K and Widec Sports. Choi set up these companies in Korea and Germany allegedly to funnel money from the foundations.

Choi gave an interview to the Segye Ilbo saying she was not leaving Germany for health reasons, denied creating a secret group called the "Eight Fairies", denied owning the tablet computer, and denied knowingly receiving classified information.

== Arrests ==
=== 2016 ===
- 31 October – Choi was arrested and summoned to the prosecutor's office for questioning.
- 2 November – Top presidential aides Ahn Jong-bum and Jeong Ho-sung were arrested for abusing power and aiding Choi. The Supreme Prosecutors' Office of Korea (SPO), in laying charges against Choi and two former presidential aides, have alleged that President Park colluded with the three in certain criminal activities. The president will be questioned by prosecutors, the first time this has occurred with a serving South Korean president.
- 8 November – Award-winning music video director Cha Eun-taek was arrested at the Incheon International Airport upon his return from China. He was accused of "meddling in state-led projects and exerting undue influence in the culture sector".
- 31 December – Chief of the National Pension Fund and former health & welfare minister Moon Hyung-pyo was arrested for pressuring the state fund to back a major merger deal for Samsung C&T.

=== 2017 ===
- 2 January – Chung Yoo-ra, the daughter of Choi Soon-sil, was arrested in Denmark for staying in the country illegally.
- 3 January – Ewha Womans University professor and renowned writer Ryu Chul-kyun (pen name Yi In-hwa) was arrested for doing the homework of Chung Yoo-ra.
- 11 January – Former chief of admissions at Ewha Womans University Namkung Gon was arrested for perjury charges.
- 12 January – Former Culture Minister Kim Jong-deok and two other former senior officials were arrested on suspicion of involvement in the blacklisting.
- 18 January – Former dean of Ewha Womans University College of Science and Industry Convergence Kim Kyung-Sook was arrested for charges of granting special admission for Chung Yoo-ra.
- 21 January – Culture Minister Cho Yoon-sun was arrested for drawing up a blacklist of cultural figures critical of Park. Former Presidential Chief of Staff Kim Ki-Choon was also arrested for masterminding the blacklist containing 10,000 cultural figures considered "left-leaning" who were critical of President Park. Ewha Womans University Professor Lee In-sung was also arrested.
- 15 February – Former Ewha Womans University president Choi Kyung Hee was arrested over charges of granting admission and grading favours to Chung Yoo-ra, a daughter of Choi Soon-sil.
- 16 February – Vice president of Samsung, Lee Jae-yong (JY Lee), was arrested on bribery charges. Mr. Lee is accused of paying $36 million in bribes to Choi Soon-sil, in return for political favours.
- In November 2017 as part of further investigations into corruption during the Park presidency, two former National Intelligence Service directors Nam Jae-joon and Lee Byung-kee were arrested for embezzlement and bribery. They were arrested for illegally funneling tens of thousands of U.S. dollars a month from their spy agency's secret budget for Park's private use through her presidential office budget.

On 30 March 2017, the Seoul Central District Court issued a warrant for Park's arrest on corruption charges. She was arrested later that day.

== Parliamentary hearing ==
On 6 December, chiefs of South Korea's major conglomerates (chaebols) came to the National Assembly to attend the first parliamentary hearing on the scandal involving Park Geun-hye and her long-time confidante Choi Soon-sil. It happened for the first time since 1988. Participants included Samsung Electronics Vice Chair Lee Jae-yong, Hyundai Motor Chair Chung Mong-koo, Lotte Group Chair Shin Dong-bin, SK Group Chair Chey Tae-won and the heads of CJ, LG, Hanwha and Hanjin, The Federation of Korean Industries. In the hearing, presidents of the chaebols told the parliament that they were not seeking favours when they made contributions to two foundations at the heart of a scandal that appeared poised to bring down Park.

On 7 December 2016, Park's former aides, including ex-chief of staff Kim Ki-choon and former Vice Culture Minister Kim Jong, testified in the 2nd parliamentary hearing about suspicions that Choi Soon-sil meddled in government affairs.

On 14 December 2016, the Special Committee of the Parliament held a 3rd hearing, focused on solving the mystery surrounding Park's 7-hour public absence on the day of the 2014 Sewol ferry sinking.

On 15 December 2016, the Special Committee held a 4th hearing to question the allegations over Mir and K-Sports foundation and how Chung Yoo-ra cheated her way through Ewha Womans University. Jeong Hyun-sik, a former K-Sports head, and former Ewha Womans University president Choi Kyung-hee and other affiliated people testified in the hearing.

On 22 December 2016, a 5th hearing was held to question former Presidential Secretary Woo Byung-woo and former presidential nurse Cho Yeo-ok.

On 26 December 2016, special committee members of the National Assembly held a 6th hearing in a prison and met Choi Soon-sil in her detention cell; she repeatedly refused to attend a parliamentary hearing. She denied most of her allegations over the influence-peddling scandal.

On 9 January 2017, a 7th hearing was held to question Culture Minister Cho Yoon-sun, former chief of admissions at Ewha Womans University Namkung Gon, K-Sports Foundation Chairman Chung Dong Chun, and a staffer at the presidential security office Ku Soon-sung. The hearing confirmed that a blacklist for left-leaning artists existed.

== Public apology and presidential approval rating falls ==
Park Geun-hye's presidential approval ratings fell to as low as 4% - Gallup Korea

Park Geun-hye Approval ratings by age

On 25 October 2016, Park publicly acknowledged her close ties with Choi and apologized to the public. On 28 October, Park dismissed key members of her top office staff while her approval ratings fell to 5%. Her approval rating ranged from 1 to 3% for Korean citizens under 60 years of age, while it remained higher at 13% for the over 60 years age group. It was the worst-ever presidential approval rating in Korean history and even lower than the 6% approval rating of former president Kim Young-sam, who was widely blamed for failing the Korean economy, which eventually led to the Asian Financial Crisis. On 4 November, Park apologized for the second time. On 29 November, Park offered to resign as president and invited the National Assembly to arrange a transfer of power. The opposition parties rejected the offer, accusing Park of attempting to avoid the process of impeachment.

== Protests ==
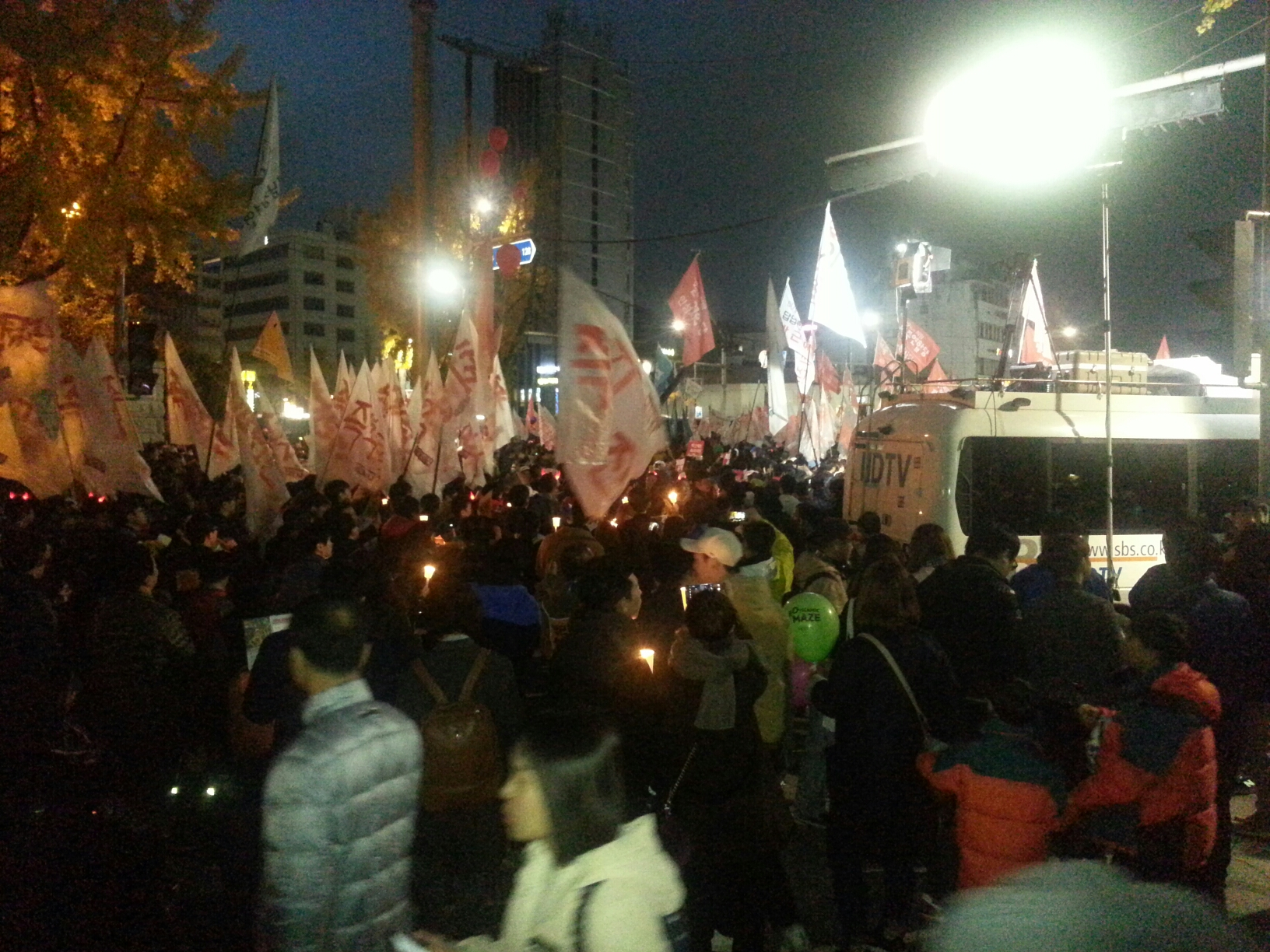
Protest held in November 2016

The revelations about the relationship between Park Geun-hye and Choi Soon-sil caused mass demonstrations in Seoul. Protesters called for the resignation of Park Geun-hye. On 12 November, more than one million citizens participated in the protests at Gwanghwamun Square close to the presidential residence demanding President Park's resignation or impeachment. On 19 November, another one million people participated in the national protest after Park refused to help the investigation of her abuse of power. On 26 November, more than 2 million people participated in the protest, calling for the resignation of Park. Protests went on, and on 21 January 2017, a 13th protest was held in Seoul with more than 200,000 attendees.

== Impeachment process ==
On 5 December 2016, three opposition parties agreed to introduce a joint impeachment motion against Park. The motion, which was signed by 171 of 300 lawmakers, was put to a vote on Friday, 9 December 2016, and passed with 234 out of 300 votes, a tally much greater than the required 2/3 majority and which included many of Park's own ruling party.

=== Court hearing and trial ===
On 19 December, Choi Soon-sil attended the first hearing in the trial of Park in Seoul District Court. In the first hearing, prosecutors say Choi used their relationship to pressure companies to donate to two foundations and siphoned off money for personal use. However, she denies the allegations that she influenced the president.

On 5 January 2017, the constitutional court began its first trial regarding Park's impeachment. On 16 January Choi Soon-sil testified herself in the Constitutional Court and denied any wrongdoings. The Constitutional Court declared that it would hold the final pleading from Park on 24 February, suggesting that the court would make a decision on the impeachment trial before 13 March.

On 10 March, the court issued a unanimous ruling, confirming the impeachment proposal and removing Park from office.

== Sentencing ==
- Choi Soon-sil was convicted on 23 June 2017 of conspiring with several officials and professors of Ewha Womans University to get her daughter admitted into the university despite not meeting the qualification criteria. She was sentenced to three years of imprisonment. The university's former professor Choi Kyung-hee as well as a former dean were both sentenced to two years of imprisonment, while another official was sentenced to 1 1/2 years in prison. Three other professors received a suspended sentence while two others were fined.
- On 13 February 2018, the Seoul Central District Court also found Choi guilty of abuse of power, bribery, and interfering in government business and sentenced her to 20 years in prison and a fine of ₩18 billion (US$16.6 million).
- On 27 July 2017, former presidential chief of staff Kim Ki-Choon was sentenced to three years in prison for his involvement in blacklisting those who were deemed leftist artists. His prison term was increased to four years on 23 January 2018.
- Former Culture Minister Cho Yoon-sun was sentenced to one year for perjury, which was suspended for two years. Another former Culture Minister Kim Jong-deok and former Vice Culture Minister Jung Kwan-joo were also sentenced to two years and 18 months in prison, respectively. Cho was given a prison term of two years on 23 January 2018 for her involvement in the blacklisting of artists.
- Samsung Electronics vice-chairman Lee Jae-Yong was convicted on 25 August 2017 for bribery, embezzlement, perjury, and other charges relating to payments and promises by Samsung worth ₩43.3 billion (about $40 million). This was partially because the company was manipulated and blackmailed by Park. He was sentenced to five years in prison. His prison term was reduced to 2 1/2 years suspended prison term on 5 February 2018, allowing him to be released. He was later returned to prison after he was sentenced to imprisonment over the same case again on 18 January 2021, being jailed for 2 1/2 years.
- Shin Dong-bin, the chairman of Lotte, was sentenced to 2 1/2 years in prison for offering a bribe of $6.5 million to Choi and former president Park on 13 February 2018. His sentence was suspended for four years on 5 October, allowing him to be released.
- On 6 April 2018, former president Park Geun-hye was sentenced to 24 years in prison and ordered to pay a fine of 18 billion won. She was found guilty of 16 of 18 charges against her.
- On 20 July 2018 Park was sentenced to 8 additional years in prison. This verdict was in relation to a separate trial but similar to the main trial due to it involving illegal money laundering and illegal favours. She was found guilty of money laundering and bribery related to the NIS scandal where three former NIS directors illegally funneled NIS funds to her personal office for her personal use without any oversight from the government.
- On 24 August 2018, Park was sentenced to 25 years in prison, an increase of 1 year, for the main Choi Soon-sil-related charges. This was due to an appeal filed by the prosecutor's office. But on 24 December 2021, it was announced that she would receive a pardon on compassionate grounds from South Korean president Moon Jae-in. She was released from prison on 31 December and returned home three months later on 24 March 2022.

=== Other figures sentenced ===
- In June 2017, the former Minister of Health and Welfare and former National Pension Service Director Moon Hyung-pyo was sentenced to 2 1/2 years in prison for his role in pressuring Samsung to approve a merger and abusing the power of his two offices. His charges were connected to the Samsung-Park scandal.
- In July 2017, former presidential secretary for cultural and sports affairs Kim So-young, was sentenced to an 18-month term suspended for two years. Former senior presidential secretary for education and culture and former vice culture minister Kim Sang-ryul as well as former presidential secretary for political affairs Shin Dong-chul, were sentenced to 18 months imprisonment.
- In January 2018, former Minister of Culture Cho Yoon-sun was sentenced to two years in prison for her role in the blacklisting scandal. She was earlier allowed to leave prison in July 2017 due to her prior lesser perjury charge being changed to a suspended sentence.
- In June 2018, three former National Intelligence Service directors (Lee Byung-kee, Lee Byung-ho, and Nam Jae-joon) who served in the Park administration were found guilty of bribing related to the 2016 Park administration scandals and sentenced to prison. They illegally transferred money from the NIS budget to Park's presidential office without any approval or oversight from the National Assembly. This illegally obtained money was used by Park and her associates for private use and to pay bribes. In addition to the three former NIS directors who were sentenced to prison former Finance Minister Choi Kyoung-hwan was sentenced to five years related to the NIS bribery scandal.

== See also ==
- Assassination of Park Chung Hee
- Corruption in South Korea
- Mun Se-gwang (man who assassinated Park's mother)
- Grigori Rasputin
- List of political scandals in South Korea
- Impeachment § South Korea
