= Anti-nuclear movement in South Korea =

The anti-nuclear movement in South Korea consists of environmental groups, religious groups, unions, co-ops, and professional associations. In December 2011, protesters demonstrated in Seoul and other areas after the government announced it had picked sites for two new nuclear plants.

Among the most active South Korean organizations in the anti-nuclear movement is the Korea's largest environmental NGO, the Korean Federation for Environmental Movement (KFEM). KFEM leads campaigns for a denuclearization, both in terms of weapons reduction and power generation solutions.

== History of the Movement ==
The "East Coast Solidarity for Anti-Nuke Group" was formed in South Korea in January 2012. It was created by the Justice and Peace committees of the four Catholic dioceses of Andong, Busan, Daegu, and Wonju. The group is against nuclear power or nuclear weapons and in favour of peace. The group will ask the government to cancel its plans for new nuclear power plants in Samcheok and Yeongdeok. They will also demand the closure of existing nuclear reactors in Wolseong and Gori, and release of information about them.

In January 2012, 22 South Korean women's groups appealed for a nuclear-free future, saying they believe nuclear weapons and power reactors "threaten our lives, the lives of our families and all living creatures". The women said they feel an enormous sense of crisis after the Fukushima nuclear disaster in March 2011, which demonstrated the destructive power of radiation in the disruption of human lives, environmental pollution, and food contamination. Unfortunately, the claims made by the South Korean women's can not be back-up with any scientific data supporting this "destructive power of radiation". More than sixteen thousand people died due to the earthquake and resulting tsunami but not a single life was lost due to the direct effects of radiation. The World Health Organization projects using the "Linear No Threshold Model" that there may be a slight increase in cancer over the natural rate in the population. The eventual number of cancer deaths, according to the linear no-threshold theory of radiation safety, that will be caused by the accident is expected to be around 130–640 people in the years and decades ahead. Although the loss of life due to any cause is of concern, these projections are a small relative number compared to other risks.

Choi Yul, president of Korea Green Foundation, has said "The March 11 disaster has proven that nuclear power plants are not safe". Choi said anti-nuclear sentiment is growing in South Korea amid the Fukushima crisis, and there is a chance to reverse the country's nuclear policy in 2012 because South Korea is facing a presidential election. He added that the anti-nuclear movement needs to spread internationally and Choi and other experts plan to create the Network for Nuclear Free East Asia. The group is scheduled to officially debut on March 11 with 311 members, from Japan, South Korea, China, and other economies.

In March 2012, on the first Fukushima nuclear disaster anniversary, South Korean environmental groups held a rally in Seoul to oppose nuclear power. Over 5,000 people attended, and the turnout was one of the largest in recent memory for an anti-nuclear rally. The demonstration demanded that President Lee Myung-bak abandon his policy of promoting nuclear power.

== Moon Administration Promise for a Nuclear-Free South Korea ==
In June 2017, South Korean President Moon Jae-in held a press conference in front of the KORI-1 nuclear facility, during which he announced the plant's decommissioning, as well as a complete phase-out of nuclear power in the country, remarking that South Korea will "abolish our nuclear-centered energy policy, and move towards a nuclear-free era." Known for his human rights pursuits, President Moon noted that the environment, life, and well being are more important than any other consideration. President Moon's defiant sentiment towards nuclear power marks a strong departure from the previous administration.

== See also ==
- One Less Nuclear Power Plant
