= One Less Nuclear Power Plant =

Seoul's energy policy launched in April 2012

Logo of Seoul

One Less Nuclear Power Plant is the flagship energy policy launched in April 2012 by Seoul, the capital city of South Korea, in its broad effort to respond to climate change and energy crisis in the aftermath of the Fukushima nuclear accident and the nationwide rolling blackout in 2011.

The main target of the One Less Nuclear Power Plant was to cut energy consumption by 2 million TOE, which is equivalent to the capacity of one nuclear power plant, mainly by directly engaging citizens in energy-saving and renewable energy generation. This target was exceeded in June 2014, six months ahead of schedule, as Seoul reduced the city’s energy consumption by 2.04 million TOE.

The Seoul Metropolitan Government announced the launch of the second phase of the One Less Nuclear Power Plant, Seoul Sustainable Energy Action Plan, in August 2014.

== Key action plans ==
With “Energy Generation, Energy Efficiency, and Energy-Saving,” at its core, the One Less Nuclear Power Plant took a multi-faceted approach, consisting of 71 specific projects in 6 policy categories, which can be re-categorized in 10 key action plans. The six policy categories include expanding renewable energy generation, improving building energy efficiency, promoting eco-friendly transportation system, generating green jobs, building a low energy-consuming city and creating a low energy-consuming civic culture.

== Key achievements (as of June 2014) ==
The One Less Nuclear Power Plant presented set an example for local energy policies as it reached its target through unique means like Seoul Feed-in Tariff (FIT), and improved rent conditions for photovoltaic power generation. The significance of the One Less Nuclear Power Plant lies in the fact that it is a civic-participatory governance policy, under which citizens took the lead in policy development and implementation.

The energy-saving programs achieved the greatest cut in energy consumption at some 910,000 TOE, while energy efficiency and generation projects pushed down the total energy consumption by 870,000 TOE and 260,000 TOE respectively.

As a result, Seoul’s consumption of energy including electricity, city gas, and oil turned downward. In 2013, when tangible outcomes of the Ones Less Nuclear Power Plant started to surface, Seoul’s electricity consumption decreased by 1.4%, whereas the nationwide consumption jumped by 1.76%.

=== Energy generation ===
Under the One Less Nuclear Power Plant, the Seoul Metropolitan Government attracted about 400 billion won in private capital to generate electricity from clean renewable sources that could be supplied to 300,000 households. 63.5 billion won out of the total private investment was used to establish 3,756 photovoltaic power generation systems with the combined capacity of 69 MW.

=== Energy efficiency ===
Seoul implemented Building Retrofit Program (BRP) on 20,000 buildings by offering loans with ultra-low interest rates of 1.75% and adopting a first-invest-return-later approach. Moreover, 6.79 million energy-efficient LED bulbs were introduced by Seoul. In particular, Seoul replaced 430,000 conventional bulbs in all 243 subway stations in the city with LED ones with the full financial support by the Korea Finance Corporation.

=== Energy-saving ===
The Eco-Mileage program, which incentives citizens’ energy-saving actions, saw its membership increase to 1.7 million, prompting energy-saving behaviors both at households and businesses. The Eco-Mileage program won the 2013 UN Public Service Award in the category of “Fostering participation in public policy decision making through innovative mechanisms.”

== Brand identity ==
The brand identity (BI) of One Less Nuclear Power Plant was designed to reflect the vision of Healing city, Healing earth. The BI was a winning project from a civic competition, which was later retouched by Mr. Dong-min Ahn, the President of Intergram Graphics, local marketing design firm.

== Slogan ==
- Energy-saving people are the Green Power Plant that reduces one nuclear power plant
- Energy culture changed by citizens, happy transition by Seoul
- Energy saved together, One Less Nuclear Power Plant achieved together

The slogans above were developed by citizens through a contest.

== Mascot ==
Dongeuri the Sunlight Angel is the mascot of One Less Nuclear Power Plant, symbolizing the face of Seoul citizens who both save and generate energy. Dongueri was designed and donated by Mr. Ho-seop Yoon, Honorary Professor of Kookmin University.

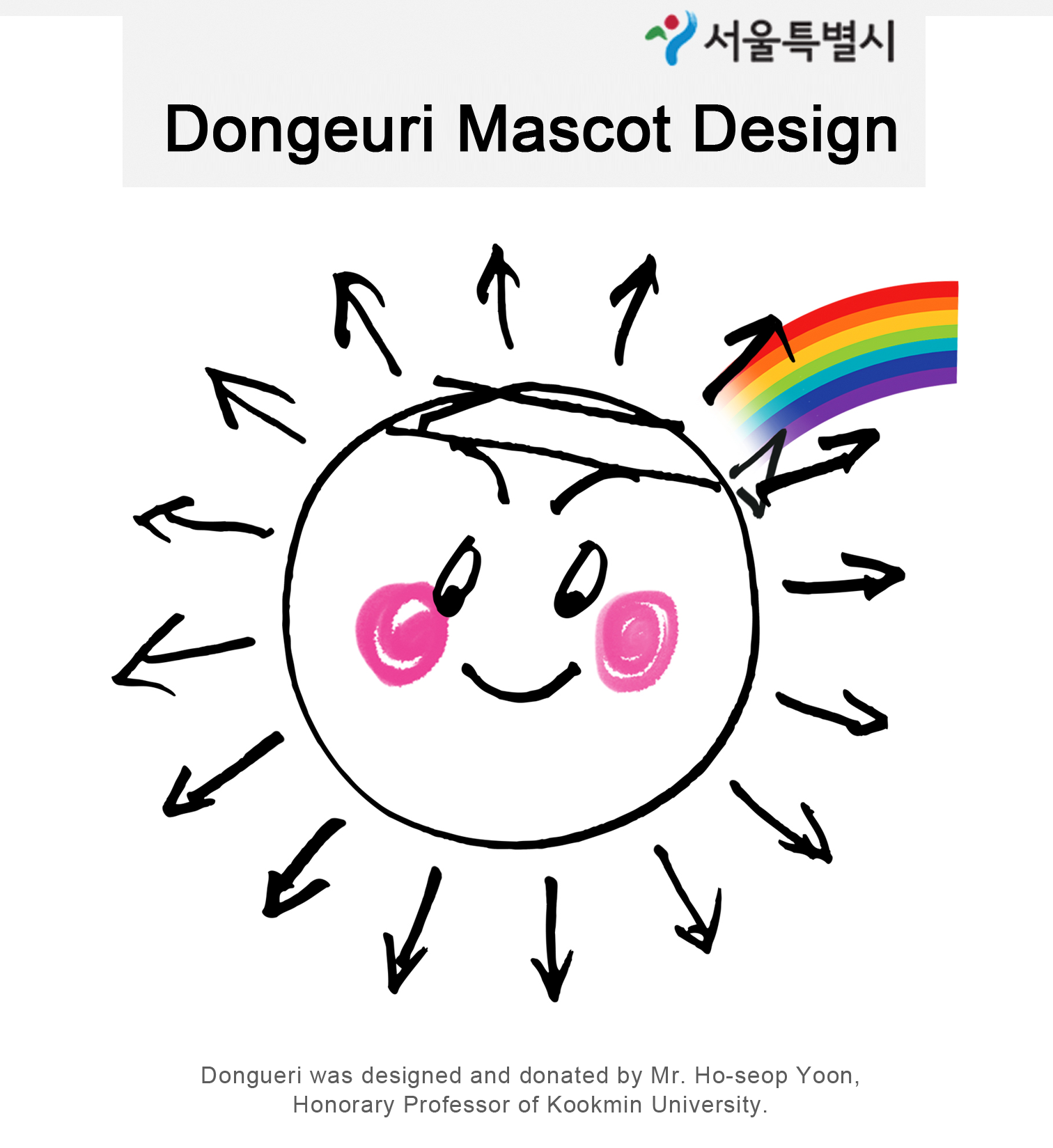
Dongeuri

== Awards ==
- 1. UN Public Service Award – in the category of fostering participation in public policy decision making through innovative mechanisms. (2013)
- 2. World Green Building Council (WGBC) Government Leadership Awards – in the category of Climate Action Leadership Award (2013)
- 3. World Wild Fund for Nature (WWF)’s 2014 Earth Hour City Challenge (EHCC) – in the category of the National Capital of the 2014 EHCC (2014)
