= BBK stock price manipulation incident =

Corruption scandal in South Korea

- Korean name
- Hangul: BBK 주가 조작 사건
- Hanja: BBK株價造作事件
- RR: BBK juga jojak sageon
- MR: BBK chuka chojak sakŏn

During the 2007 South Korean presidential election, there were allegations made about presidential candidate Lee Myung-bak's relationship with a company called BBK. In 1999, Lee would meet Kim, with whom he established BBK and the LKE Bank. Their business enterprise went bankrupt less than a year later. Kim was investigated for alleged involvement in the massive embezzlement and for alleged stock price-manipulation.

== History ==
Kim initially stated that Lee had no involvement in the company, despite allegations of an affair between Lee, the candidate and his sister Kim, then a Los Angeles-based practicing attorney, though subsequently disbarred. Kim allegedly introduced Lee to her brother Kim, a former Merrill Lynch investment banker, meaning Lee's alleged mistress enlisted the aid of her brother in order to make money for, and together with, Lee who allegedly was desperate for campaign funds. Kim Hong-il of the Seoul Central District Prosecutors Office cleared Lee of any wrongdoing, based on Kim's testimony and Lee's denial that he had ever been associated with BBK. That would soon prove to be untrue, as it soon came to light that Lee, in public speeches by him, had publicly admitted that he was the owner of BBK. Three days before the election, an October 2000 video surfaced of Lee delivering a speech to an audience of students at Kwangwoon University, in which he can be seen "bragging" that he had founded and directed BBK activities ("BBK? Yup, that's mine!"). Two days before the election, the National Assembly appointed a prosecutor and charged him with the task of investigating the matter.

Chung Ho-young, as the Special Prosecutor in charge of the investigation, would soon declare Lee innocent of the accusations relating to the alleged fraud and the so-called BBK incident. Critics pointed out that the investigation appeared to have been compromised, and that the prosecution may have felt intimidated, as it chose not to delve any further, likely assuming that Lee would be elected president. Lee was also interviewed rather than interrogated. The fact that the particular establishment where the Lee interview took place was once known as a kisaeng house did not sit well with the public once the news broke. A kisaeng house refers to a high-end, brothel-like restaurant establishment where female attendants/entertainers cater to men of power and wealth. In response to public outcry, the special prosecutor's office announced that the initial interview location had been leaked to the media. Therefore, it was changed at the last minute to a new location—the former kisaeng house, nestled in a secluded, remote area away from the city, safe from prying eyes. They also declared that they had gone in fully prepared and had more than sufficient time to conduct the interview.

Eventually, prosecutors sought a 15-year sentence and a fine of 30 billion won for former BBK owner Kim on charges of stock manipulation and embezzlement. In the final hearing held at the Seoul Central District Court, the prosecutors said Kim, who founded and operated the boiler-room operation is suspected of crimes including embezzlement of ₩31.9 billion of investors' money, stock manipulation, and the forgery and execution of private documents but had shown no remorse nor repaid his debts.

Earlier, Kim Ki-dong, a prosecutor at the Seoul Central District Prosecutors' Office, said, "This is a case in which an individual person has made a mockery of the Republic of Korea." For spreading "false" rumors about Lee on the eve of the presidential election, the Seoul Central District Court convicted Kim of violating the nation's election law, handing down a one-year prison term. He was given another six months for document forgery to back his attacks on Lee. Prosecutors said in a statement that Kim had been changing the story with endless lies throughout the whole investigation process, making it extremely hard for them to draw up the protocol. He even denied their request to use a lie detector. Prosecutors added by saying, "Kim's defense attorney also made a false statement by saying those who testified against Kim were all liars and committing perjury. This, in fact, is a contradictory statement to the Attorneys-at-Law and attorney ethics".

In the end, Kim ended up asserting that President Lee had nothing to do with the BBK scandal and that he had hoped to avoid criminal liability by manipulating the prevailing circumstances in Korea at the time. Kim would later be convicted in Korea for his role in the incident and serve an eight-year sentence. Upon his release, he would later allege that Lee was indeed a part owner of BBK and as such had a major involvement in the BBK stock manipulation incident. Kim's allegation is that he lied under pressure from Lee, and as he thought that Lee, as his former partner in crime, would help him avoid being convicted. As it turned out otherwise, Kim has held numerous news conferences alleging Lee's involvement in the BBK matter.

Some of the prosecutors who worked on the BBK case were promoted under Lee's presidency. Meanwhile, the US federal district court ruled that Kim was not subject to prosecution regarding BBK. Subsequent to that, the very same prosecutors came under investigation and scrutiny for their alleged role in looking the other way, thereby helping to elect candidate Lee as president of South Korea.

According to leaked diplomatic cables, Yoo Chong-ha (유종하), the former co-chairman of Lee Myung-bak's presidential election campaign, had requested of Alexander Vershbow, the then American ambassador to South Korea, that the US authorities help delay the extradition of Kim to Korea as sought by the Korean government. This request was made to help presidential hopeful Lee Myung-bak's election campaign better control and effectively contain the controversy relating to Lee's alleged involvement in the BBK embezzlement scandal on the eve of the election season.

=== 2012 ===
Shin Myung, the alleged writer of the fake letter, returned to South Korea from the US and turned himself in to the SPO on April 4, 2012.

== DAS ==
DAS is a South Korean company involved in the BBK scandal. When allegations of fraud arose as part of the BBK matter, it was originally purported in late December 2011 that the owners of DAS were members of Lee Myung-bak's family, e.g., Lee Sang-Eun (이상은), one of Lee's older brothers, but not Lee himself. The Korean prosecutors at the time announced that Lee did not appear to be the owner of DAS, a position from which they now appear to be backtracking based on mounds of fresh evidence. As of early March 2018, for instance, it has been alleged that Lee Myung-Bak is, and always has been, the true owner of DAS, which the Korean government itself owns a portion of, received as payment of inheritance taxes owed by Lee's family. To that end, the Korean prosecution has obtained testimony not only from Kim Baek-Joon, Lee Myung-Bak's decades-long confidant, private secretary, de facto butler and putative errand boy now turning state's evidence, but also from Lee Sang-Deuk, another older brother of Lee's who on Friday, 2 March 2018 testified that the seed money that went into the founding of DAS in the guise of proceeds from the sale of property in Seoul's posh Dogok-dong district, was not his own, but in fact that of his brother Lee Myung-Bak's, with the younger Lee being the actual owner of the Dogok-dong property. The legal implications concerning Lee Myung-Bak's alleged ownership of DAS is far-reaching and has thrown the whole of South Korea into turmoil. For irrespective of the corporate ownership structure of DAS on paper, Lee Myung-Bak would be the true beneficial owner of DAS, making the question of DAS' legal ownership less important than the fact that DAS, for all intents and purposes, has been and is the "alter ego" of Lee Myung-Bak's throughout all relevant periods, especially for the purposes of funneling overseas bribes. This further implicates the FCPA ("Foreign Corrupt Practices Act of 1977") which allows the U.S. courts to exercise extraterritorial jurisdiction if the proscribed act involves US persons natural or juridical. The latest details of allegations involving BBK, DAS, and Lee implicate Samsung's having bankrolled DAS' legal fees by remitting millions of dollars as payment in DAS' behalf to Akin, Gump, Strauss, Hauer, and Feld, a prominent U.S. law firm representing DAS in a lawsuit brought against it by Optional Ventures as plaintiff for alleged theft and conversion of funds belonging to Optional Ventures which Kim had embezzled as part of the BBK scandal. Samsung, as widely reported in the Korean press, is alleged to have funneled a substantial amount of money to Lee through said U.S. law firm with the aid and involvement of one or more of its overseas U.S. subsidiaries. Under U.S. law, that would constitute a bribery of a foreign official by U.S. persons, natural or juridical, if true. Lee Myung-Bak at the time was not merely a foreign official, but the sitting president of South Korea: Samsung's alleged payment of DAS' legal fees to, and through, Akin, Gump, Strauss, Hauer, and Feld means that everyone is on the hook, ranging from Lee Myung-Bak himself as the recipient of said bribes; to Akin, Gump, for functioning as the conduit as part, and in furtherance, of the conspiracy to violate the FCPA and the attendant conspiracy to violate United States law, which is a separate crime in and of itself; to Samsung and its subsidiaries through which the alleged payments were channeled; to even Lee Kun-Hee, Samsung's purportedly ailing chairman, for his alleged role in giving the greenlight on the paying of bribes (allegedly at least some of it) to Lee in the form of DAS' legal fees; to Korean-American attorney Suk Han Kim, then a partner with Akin, Gump and now with a different firm, for allegedly setting up the whole deal on behalf of Samsung and for the benefit of Lee Myung-Bak. Such FCPA woes are compounded by Samsung's alleged amounts paid to and through Akin, Gump in excess of the legal fees owed by DAS, suggesting there are likely additional U.S. law violations, e.g., money laundering and wire fraud, which are violations under the Stamp Act as provided in the United States Code. While the investigation by the Korean prosecutors into Lee's ownership of DAS and Samsung's alleged overseas bribery is still on-going, and though the focus by the local Korean prosecutors is on domestic Korean aspects only, it may be that there is now sufficient probable cause to warrant a grand jury hearing and an indictment to trigger a massive FCPA investigation by the U.S. Department of Justice.

== Reaction from the US Federal Court ==
The Korean language Korean-American newspaper, Sunday Journal, published an article on December 1, 2011, that the U.S. Federal District Court in Los Angeles rescinded the confiscation order entered against DAS on November 17, 2011.

== Controversy ==
The Supreme Court of Korea officially decided to indict one of the hosts of Naneun Ggomsuda, Chung Bong-ju, for false reporting of the BBK-related information.

== See also ==
- Lee Myung-bak government
- Criticism of Lee Myung-bak
- King Maker, 2007 South Korean novel by Kim Jin-myeong (김진명) portraying the BBK incident
- Political scandals in South Korea
