= South Korean illegal surveillance incident =

The South Korean illegal surveillance incident (Korean: 민간인 불법사찰 사건, or illegal civilian surveillance incident) was alleged to have occurred in 2010 when the Civil Service Ethics Division (공직윤리지원관실) under the Prime Minister's Office of South Korea inspected a civilian, a political action that is illegal under the South Korean conventions. The incident re-emerged in early 2012 as the election approached.

Under Lee Myung-bak's presidency, the South Korean intelligence services (NIS) orchestrated campaigns to manipulate public opinion. NIS-led "NGOs" have conducted media campaigns against opponents of the government; denounced the "buses of hope" (which emerged to support a trade union movement in 2011), criticized the proposals for free school meals and free medical care and called for the disbandment of the Democratic Labour Party. In 2012, the NIS conducted a slander campaign against the presidential candidate Moon Jae-in in order to divert voters to the conservative candidate Park Geun-hye. In February 2015, the former head of the NIS was sentenced to three years in prison for his role in these manipulations.

== Background ==
=== Kim Jong-ik ===
The surveillance scandal originally developed as an investigation of a South Korean civilian named Kim Jong-ik (Korean: 김종익), a bank worker who posted in his blog a video clip Jwiko (Korean: 쥐코) that lampooned President Lee Myung-bak as a rat in a fashion from the movie, Sicko. This has generated multiple controversies such as concerns of Internet censorship and political misconducts. In a March 2012 interview of Kim Jong-ik, he said he has been "emotionally scarred" and was forced to resign his position at his company and move to Japan. He had lost his means to support his family and accumulated debt. Kim did not know why he himself was singled out as a target, as many others had posted the same video. He expressed deep concerns towards the government of this happening again.

== Investigation ==
In 2012, the Supreme Prosecutors' Office of the Republic of Korea (SPO) has decided to reopen the case based on testimonies of the bureau insider, Jang Jin-su (장진수). A special team of prosecutors was formed to investigate the surveillance incident and a potential cover up.

The SPO raided the Prime Minister's Office for the first time in its history on July 9, 2010. The SPO eventually discovered an alleged concealment of evidence. Former Presidential Secretary for Employment and Labor Relations, Lee Young-ho (이영호), was banned from leaving the country for his involvement in the incident.

Former Presidential Secretary Lee Young-ho and former Presidential Labor Advisor Choi Jong-seok were arrested on April 3, 2012, for allegedly ordering Jang Jin-su to destroy the information related to the surveillance. On April 4, 2012, Jang Jin-su revealed pictures of 50 million won he claims he received from Rhyu Chung-ryeol, a former Prime Minister's Office official, as a bribe to destroy the data, through the independent South Korean news source, OhMyNews.

=== Roh Moo-hyun and Lee Myung-bak administrations ===
As the scandal was revisited during the 2012 Korea elections, debate has expanded over into conducts by both the current and previous regimes. Some have alleged that surveillance was done during both the previous and the current regime.

== Media reports ==
Munhwa Broadcasting Corporation, a notable media outlet, claimed to expose the incident in its journalist-oriented investigative program, PD Notebook, on June 29, 2010.

The KBS-affiliated journalists who are on strike claimed to have obtained 2,619 surveillance-related cases of reports from the Lee Myung-bak government. However, it was later reported that over 80% of the alleged illegal surveillance records were actually created during the previous Roh Moo-hyun regime. Of the 2,619 documents, only 120 were considered actual reports, and 2 reports were of civilians. Two former executives of National Intelligence Service, Koh Yeong-gu and Kim Man-bok denied the claims. The KBS union immediately posted a tweet calling the explanation a lie, but soon changed stance and apologized for the inaccurate information. The KBS journalists who are on strike later refuted the claim. They claimed that the total of cases including the duplicated entities are 2,837; total of cases during the Roh administration are 2,356 and written by police forces who follow normal procedures in which only 10 cases are involved with civilians.

== Public opinion ==
The main opposition Democratic United Party demanded a full reinvestigation of the incident. The Korea Times and The New York Times compared the scandal to the American Watergate scandal, referring to it as the "Watergate of Korea". The conservative political activist and a current Saenuri Party political reformer, Lee Sang-don, made a remark during a radio interview on April 5, 2012:

The illegal surveillance case is exactly the same as the Watergate scandal. [U.S. President Richard] Nixon didn't instruct the illegal spying but stepped down from presidency for covering up the case.

== See also ==
- Lee Myung-bak
- Lee Myung-bak government
- Roh Moo-hyun
- Political scandals in South Korea
