= Political repression in South Korea =

Political repression in South Korea refers to the physical or psychological maltreatment, including different levels of threats suffered by individuals or groups in South Korea for different kinds of political reasons throughout the country's history.

The origins can be traced back to the tyranny of emperors in the early times during the Joseon Period, especially the notorious despot named Yeonsangun. And then the break-out of the Korean War brought inestimably huge repression on the populace for the following period. After that, Syngman Rhee, as an anti—communist, conducted severe political repression against some perceived opposition and was also guilty of embezzlement of millions of dollars and electoral corruption, which eventually triggered the April Revolution. It culminated in the 1970s, known as the "Dark age for democracy" in Korea when Park Chung Hee tried to prolong his rule and strengthen his power by deliberately rigging election results and changing relevant legislation. Following that came the Bu-Ma Democratic Protest and Gwangju Uprising. And it continued to exist as a consequence of the reveal of Park Geun-hye's political scandal, when she turned out to have a large reliance on her cronyism.

In terms of online daily life, South Korea has set severe limitations on Internet by establishing substantial and complicated Internet censorship. It blocks the accessibility to information from foreign websites and keeps an eye on domestic critical arguments and anti-action. Whist, "endless" protests and demonstrations under repression also reflect the political democracy in this country to some extent.

== Origins and early South Korea times -tyranny of emperor ==
Early on, there were five main existing methods used to tortured and punished criminals during the period of Joseon Period according to Everyday Life in Joseon-Era Korea: beating with a light stick (tae), beating with a heavy stick (jang), penal servitude (do), banishment (ryu), and execution (sa). They were conducted on criminals in line with the severity of their crimes. A light stick beat was a punishment for the minor crimes while execution was the harshest and most horrible type of punishment. The degree incremented in order.

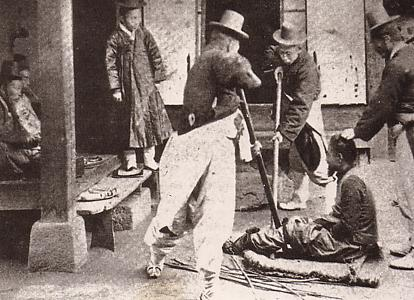
Torture in the Joseon Period

In terms of Joseon king's ruling styles, there were three kinds of them: a king ordering directly without considering others' opinions which was named as Arbitrary Decision (AD), a king discussing an issue with the officials and then conducting his order named Discussion and Order (DO) and a king discussing an issue with the officials and then deciding to take their suggestion called Discussion and Follow (DF). Yeonsangun who was evaluated as a tyrant turned out to have the highest high number of AD.

Also, unlike other previous emperors, his increasing the tax burden on commoners and adding pressure on peasantry consequently contributed to the widening wealth gap between rich and poor areas during his reign, which reflected on the tyranny of this emperor.

== Repressions in territories -The Korea War began ==
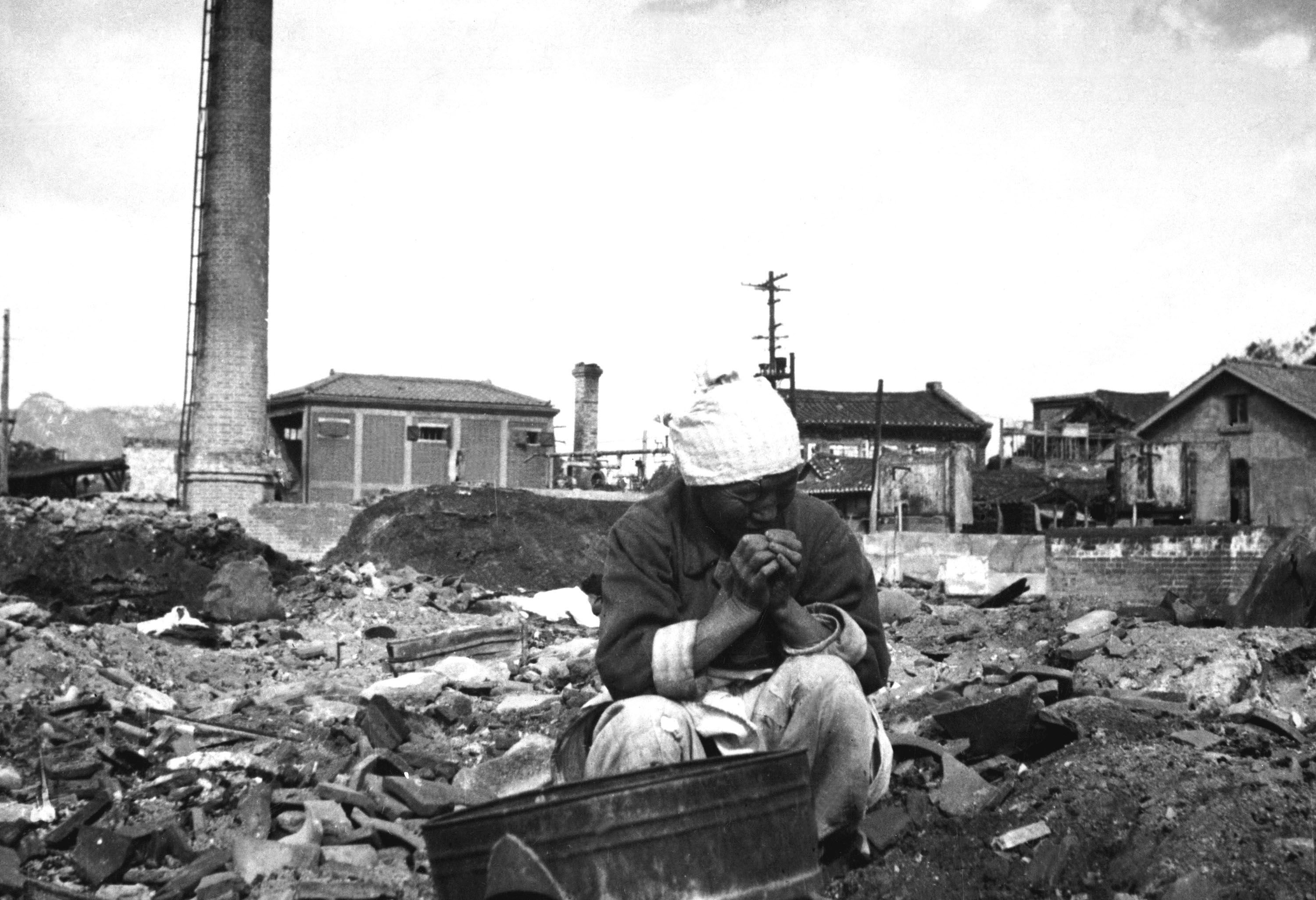
The peasantry suffered a lot both physically and mentally, became starving and homeless due to Korea War.

Influenced by the Cold War between the Soviet Union and the United States both with their alliance in regards to communism and capitalism to a large extent, North Korea invaded the South, trying to unify the whole territory. Syngman Rhee, as an anti-communist, also worked closely with other Korean Protestant clergy to spread ideas about "militant anti-communism" with the attempt to eliminate them and unify this country.

Although supported by more than three millions communist soldiers from China and Soviet Union, North Korea ended up to be defeated when sixteen UN nations supplied fighting units to help Republic of Korea to terminate this war. The whole process including the actual armed conflicts and the negotiation on the governmental basis lasted over five years and eventually ended up when the Korean Armistice Agreement was signed. Korea suffered catastrophically with losing more or less 3 million of lives, conjointly making 5 million citizens become homeless and experience the separation from loved ones. More seriously, it made irretrievable ruin on economy of both North Korea and South Korea.

== April 19 Revolution - strike-back of students ==
April 19 Revolution
- Date: 19/04/1960
- Location: Masan
- Cause: huge dissatisfaction of Rhee's despotism and corruption, use of violence against political opposition, and poor development of South Korea
- Motive: a high school student was killed due to his protest against the rigged elections
- Outcome: Rhee resigned on 26 April 1960

The suddenly bizarre death of the democratic candidate named Choung Pyong-ok cleaned obstacles lying in front of Syngman Rhee who was, at that time, already 85 years old. Considering that the power of the vice presidency would become another potential threat to him, he then selected Lee Ki-poong, who failed the election four years ago and was a comparatively weak rival. Also, Rhee deployed police to interfere with the whole election, attempting to prolong his rule in the way of rigging election results step by step.

Segments of the Korean populace were infuriated as a consequence of this foregone conclusion and hence started the protests against Rhee. To put down the opposed students' demonstration, police shot upon innocent citizens and the corpse of a high school student discovered by a fisherman triggered this April Revolution. People, especially students from colleges and universities, gathered together to protest the inhumane and arbitrary rule of Rhee. In the end, Rhee resigned on 26 April 1960 and Lee along with his family died.

== "Dark age for democracy" in Korea ==
During the period of Park Chung Hee's presidential rule in 1970s when he thought he might lose his power and fail the election, he brought several legislation and regulations into force to make his "legal dictatorship" come true. What's worse, he suspended the president election combined with deliberately changing the domestic policy called Yushin Constitution (Revitalization Reform) to reign for unlimited number of six-year terms, leading Korea to the Fourth Republic. He also empowered the military to take armed action when necessary. Therefore, political repression conducted by entitled local police during that period such as unreasonable arrests, mental and physical torture, surveillance abuse and imprisonment of political opponents, particularly university students were quite common.

=== Bu-Ma Democratic Protests ===
In 1979, there was a sit-in held by female workers from YH Trading Company in the place of New Democratic Party headquarter. Following the violent suppression of this strike, Kim Young-sam was expelled from National Assembly. Escalating political repression subsequently triggered the Bu-Ma Democratic Protests. Thousands of university students and citizens from Pusan and Masan appealed to abolish the Yushin regime. Unfortunately, lots of students and civilians got injured and 66 people were under arrest and referred to military court. Following the aftermath of the events, Park was shot dead at a private dinner by Korean Central Intelligence Agency director Kim Jae-gyu.

=== Gwangju Uprising ===
After the assassination of Park Chung Hee on 26 October 1979, the new junta attempted to seize the power and maintain the Yusin regime by taking armed action and killing opponents. On 18 May, students gathered together in Chonnam National University to demonstrate and protest while soldiers clubbed or even charged at them. The government even sent paratroopers to take control of this political revolt. With the circumstance getting more severe, the army started to shoot on innocent onlookers. This merciless and cruel suppression led to hundreds of drivers to join in the protest by driving their cars one by one. The armed forces then brutally assaulted them when they were trying to take injured people to hospital. According to official statistics from Martial Law Command, more than one hundred citizens died during this protest and thousands of people got injured. They suffered a loss at that time but benefited from this uprising in the long term thanks to their bravery to fight back the unreasonable political repression.

== South Korean illegal surveillance incident ==
This surveillance scandal started as a result of widely watched online video clip made by a Korea civilian named Kim Jong-ik who criticized the current president ironically and implicitly. Then the administration officials noticed him and monitored him, following the instructions of Cheong Wa Dae. This incident eventually erupted when this man could not bear the political repression any more and then stood out to publish his opinions. There is also evidence that one official for Lee Myung-bak even tried to cover up the truth by bribing the staff who knew relevant information. The former prime minister Chung Un-chan tried to reconstruct the ethic department but failed in the end. Involved staff were arrested in the end.

== Park Geun-hye's political scandals ==
=== Sinking of MV Sewol ===
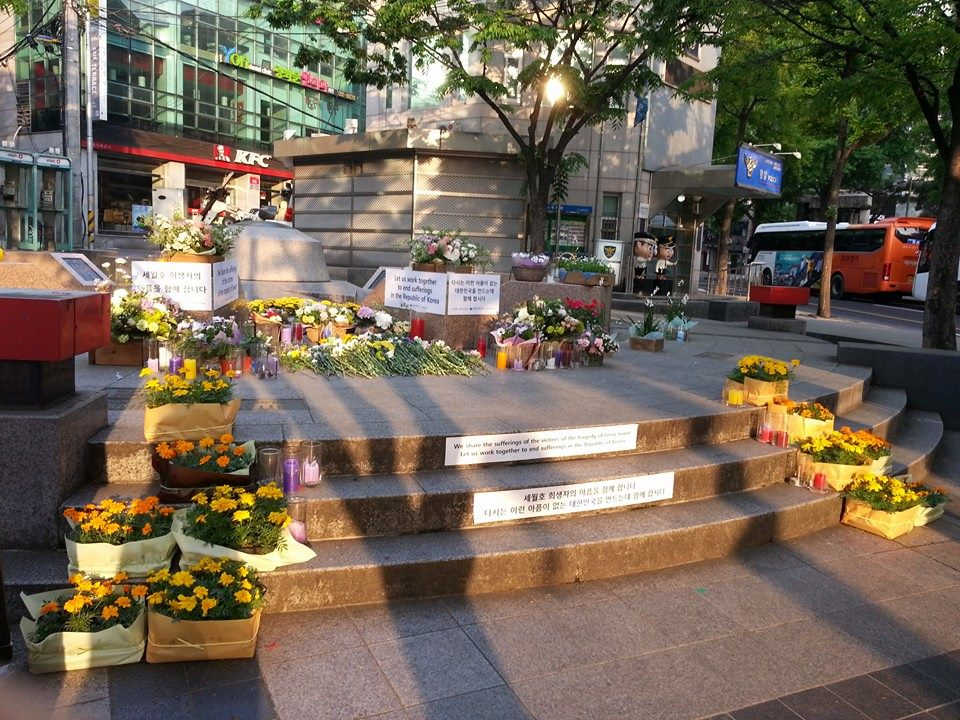
Citizens mourned for the sinking of Sewol.

The sinking of MV Sewol brought indelibly huge impacts to South Korea society not only for that more than half of the passengers the majority of whom were high school students were dead or missing but also for that the captain thought about his own safety first rather than rescuing others.

When this tragedy happened, the government under Park Geun-hye's instruction failed to respond timely and organically. What is worse, the administration even tried to downplay the protests against president Park, cover up this administration as a simply ferry accident and set up a new commission responsible for monitoring critiques about her. Conjointly, Park made a blacklist with many artists' and litterateurs' names on it which was intended to forbid them to participate in any events to do with the sinking of Sewol.

=== Terminal High Altitude Area Defense ===
On 17 October 2013, the South Korea military showed primary intention to install Terminal High Altitude Area Defense (THAAD) to strengthen its military power to defend itself against North Korea. The US and South Korea government decided to deploy this anti-missile system by the end of 2017.

Residents in Soseong-ri strongly opposed THAAD due to the constant huge noise of the generators and that of helicopters' shuttling supplies. Moreover, peasants worried about that waves from radar would damage their corps. "No Nukes, No THAAD" was a popular slogan at that time. There were also complaints that Park was too obedient to the United States government and was so self-righteous that she seldom listened to citizens' opinions. There is no denying that the operation of THAAD ignores the health of residents and affects income sources of local farmers.

=== 2016 South Korean political scandal – cronyism Choi Soon-sil ===
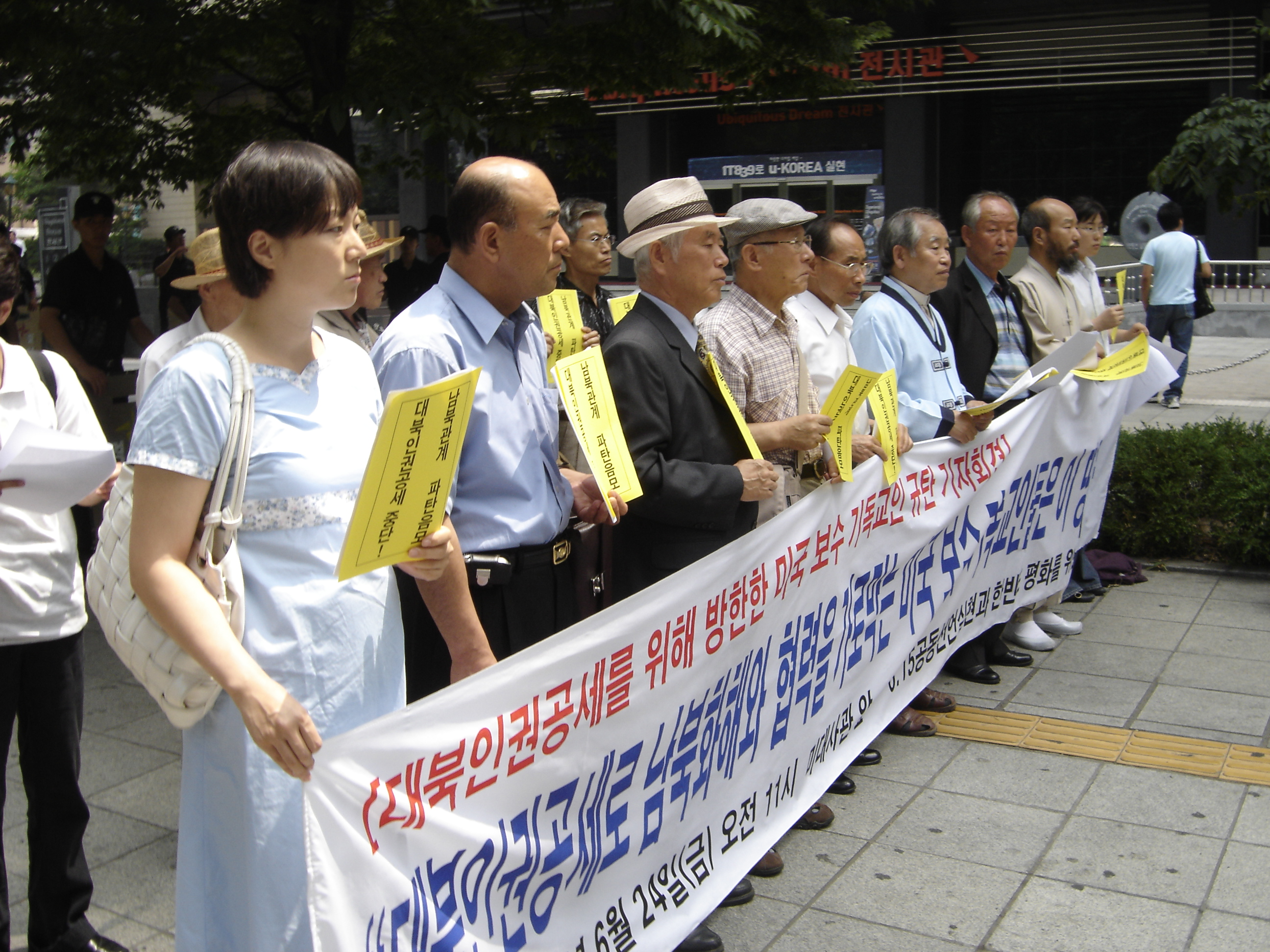
Citizens gathered together to protest against Park Geun-hye on the street.

Choi Soon-sil, the "closest" friend of Park, was convicted of taking advantage of power to grab large bribes from several big companies, tamper with official documents arbitrarily and give way to her daughter by changing the admission of Ewha Womans University. Also, Choi was reported to have access to confidential government information and frequently meet different officials to discuss about president Park's issue in her own office.

Feeling cheated and made use of, approximately one million citizens marched into Gwanghwamun Square, in central Seoul, to demonstrate and protest. It is also known as South Korea's biggest candlelit protest in the recent years.

In the end, Park Geun-hye, the first female president of South Korea, was sentenced to prison along with her friend Choi Soon-sil.
