= Human rights in Korea =

The human rights situation in Korea is the subject of two separate articles:

- The human rights in North Korea
- The human rights in South Korea
