= Thomas Kretschmann =

German actor (born 1962)

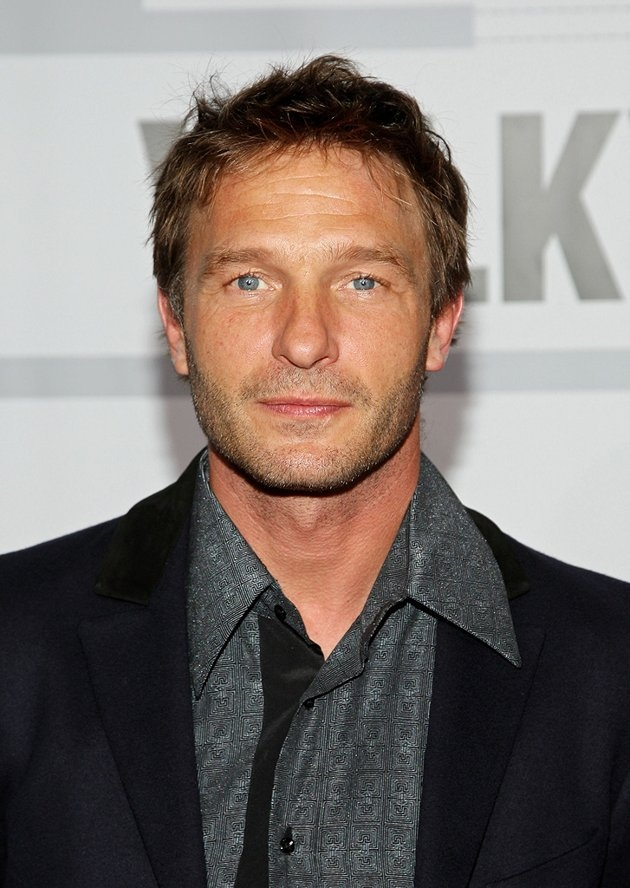
- Kretschmann in March 2012
- Born: 8 September 1962 (age 64); Dessau, Bezirk Halle, East Germany
- Occupations: Actor, screenwriter, producer
- Years active: 1985–present
- Partner: Brittany Rice (2011–present)
- Children: 3

Thomas Kretschmann (pronounced [ˈtoːmas ˈkʁɛtʃman]; born 8 September 1962) is a German actor who has appeared in many European and American films. Best known for portraying historical or fictional military officers, his notable roles include Lieutenant Hans von Witzland in Stalingrad (1993), Hauptmann Wilm Hosenfeld in The Pianist (2002), Hermann Fegelein in Downfall (2004), Captain Englehorn in King Kong (2005), Major Otto Remer in Valkyrie (2008), the voice of Professor Z in Cars 2 (2011), and the journalist Jürgen Hinzpeter in A Taxi Driver (2017). He also portrayed Baron Wolfgang von Strucker in the Marvel Cinematic Universe films Captain America: The Winter Soldier (2014) and Avengers: Age of Ultron (2015).

Kretschmann has twice been nominated for the Deutscher Fernsehpreis for Best Actor. He is also a European Film Award and Nika Award nominee.

== Career ==
At the age of 25, he began acting, starring in numerous European films and television series, including Westler in 1985. Then in 1991, Kretschmann was awarded the Max Ophüls Prize for best young actor for his role in Der Mitwisser. He went on to star in his first full-length feature, the 1993 film Stalingrad. He achieved international recognition for his role as sadomasochistic rapist and murderer Alfredo Grossi in Dario Argento's The Stendhal Syndrome.

Although popular in his homeland, Kretschmann did not achieve notice in Hollywood until his role as Hauptmann Wilm Hosenfeld in Roman Polanski's 2002 film The Pianist. In the years since, Kretschmann has often portrayed military officers in films about the Third Reich. In the 2004 film Downfall, Kretschmann played Hermann Fegelein, a Waffen-SS general and brother-in-law to Eva Braun.

Kretschmann made his first appearance on American television in 2003 when he guest starred in two episodes of 24 as Max, a role he would reprise in the 2006 video game adaptation. He later also appeared in Relic Hunter. In 2004, Kretschmann played Timothy Cain, a ruthless Umbrella major, in Resident Evil: Apocalypse. In the same year, he appeared in the French film Immortal with Linda Hardy. The film was notable for its use of a digital backlot and interaction between Computer-generated characters and real actors. In 2005, Kretschmann won a role in Peter Jackson's remake of King Kong, where he worked again with Adrien Brody, with whom he had costarred in The Pianist.

The following year, Kretschmann began to win acclaim for his role in Butterfly: A Grimm Love Story (Rohtenburg in Germany). A psychological thriller, the movie co-stars Keri Russell and was inspired by the Armin Meiwes cannibalism case. It was scheduled for a March 2006 release in Germany, but its showing is under injunction after Meiwes successfully sued to have it banned on grounds of infringement of his personality rights. At the 2006 Festival de Cine de Sitges, Kretschmann shared the Best Actor award for his performance in this film with his co-star Thomas Huber. Kretschmann also shared Best Actor with Huber at the 2007 Puchon International Fantastic Film Festival.

In 2008, Kretschmann was hired to voice Johann Krauss in Guillermo del Toro's Hellboy II: The Golden Army. However, after several trials del Toro decided that Kretschmann's voice and the mechanical sound FX to Johann's suit did not mesh well, so the part went to Seth MacFarlane. That same year, he appeared in the action thriller Wanted, alongside Angelina Jolie, Morgan Freeman and James McAvoy. That same year, he starred in the thriller Valkyrie, playing Major Otto Ernst Remer, a Wehrmacht officer who had a key role in stopping the 20 July Plot. Prior to the casting of Tom Cruise, Kretschmann had been considered to play Colonel Claus von Stauffenberg. Kretschmann also played Adolf Eichmann in a 2007 biographical film.

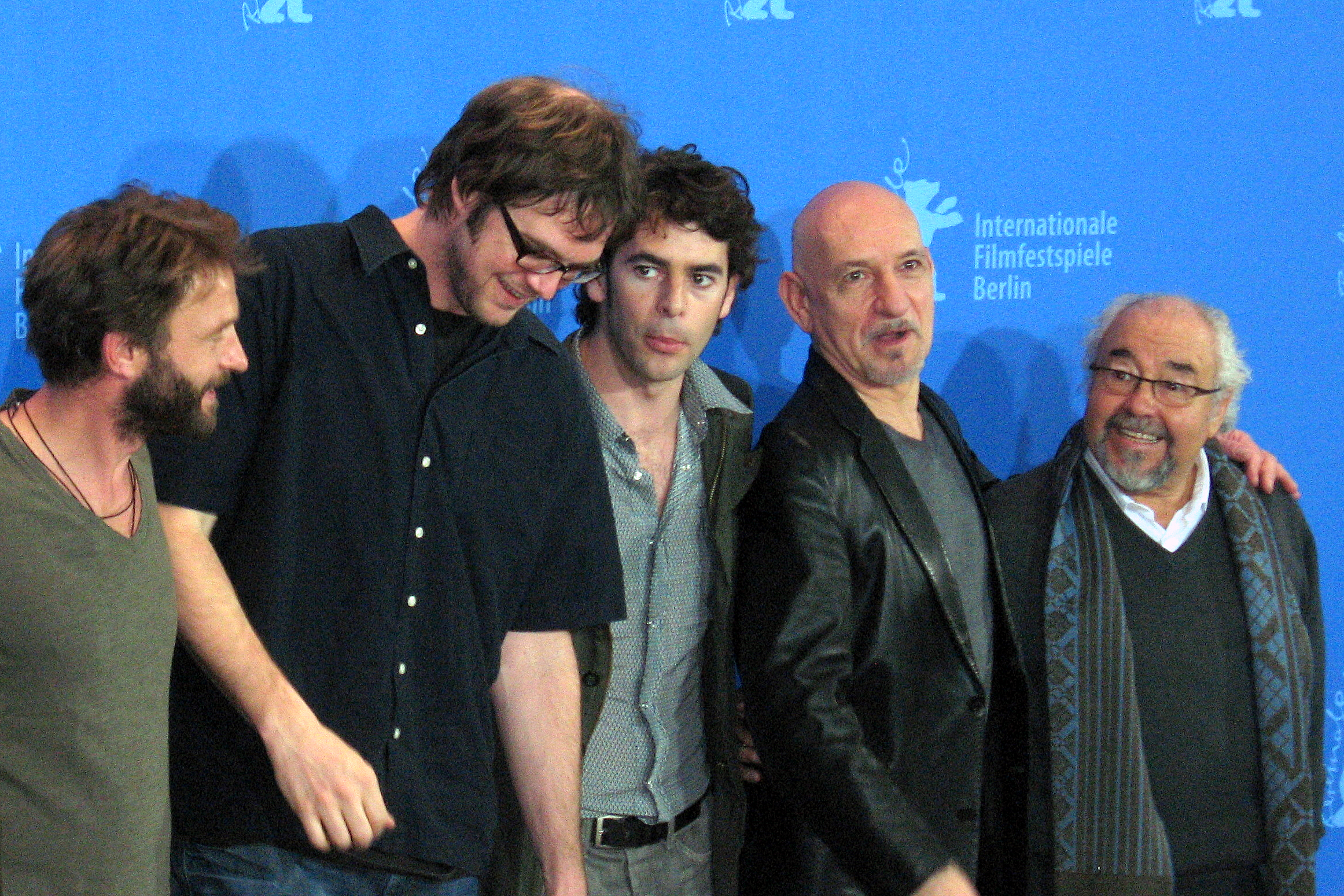
Thomas Kretschmann (far left) at a press conference for the Film Transsiberian, 2008

2009 saw Kretschmann guest star in the American science-fiction TV drama series FlashForward, as well as a major secondary part in the British biopic The Young Victoria as King Leopold I of Belgium. This film also received three Academy Awards nominations in 2010 for Best Art Direction, Makeup, and won for Costume Design.

The next year he returned to Germany, guest starring as himself in the romantic comedy Rabbit without Ears 2. Kretschmann then moved to Malaysia in the summer to shoot his scenes for the German biopic Jungle Child based on the eponymous bestseller by Sabine Kuegler. The film was released in early 2011. Walt Disney Pictures confirmed in November 2010, that Kretschmann would star as one of the voice talents in the Pixar film Cars 2. The film was released in the United States on 24 June 2011, in the United Kingdom on 22 July and in Germany on 28 July.

Kretschmann starred as Captain Kurt Brynildson in the 2011–2012 ABC original paranormal/adventure/horror television series The River about a group of people on a mission to find a missing TV explorer in the Amazon.

Kretschmann signed a multi-film contract with Marvel Studios to play Baron Wolfgang von Strucker, and first appeared as the character in a post-credits scene of the 2014 film Captain America: The Winter Soldier. He had a larger role as the character in the 2015 film Avengers: Age of Ultron.

Kretschmann often re-records his own parts for the German dubs of his screen roles. Aside from acting, Kretschmann has also worked as a fashion model, including a stint as the face for a scent by Hugo Boss.

== Filmography ==
Year	Title	Role	Language	Other notes
1989	Der Mitwisser	Paul	German	Television film Max Ophüls Prize for Best Young Actor
1992	Shining Through	Man At Zurich Station	English	
1992	The Warrior's Heart	Lieutenant Maximillian Luedt	Norwegian	
1993	Stalingrad	Lieutenant Hans von Witzland	German	
1993	Die Ratte	Sven	German	
1994	La Reine Margot	Nançay	French	
1995	Derrick	The Husband of The Murderess	German	Television series; Season 22, Episode 4: "Teestunde mit einer Mörderin"
1995	I Love My Daughter's Husband	Michael	German	Television film
1996	The Stendhal Syndrome	Alfredo Grossi	Italian	
1996	Marching in Darkness (Marciando nel buio)	Gianni Tricarico	Italian	
1997	Refuge	Santos	German	Television film
1997	Prince Valiant	Thagnar	English	
1998	Ms. Diamond	Tim Kaiser	German	Television film
1999	Esther: The Bible	King Ahasuerus of Persia	English	Television film
1999	Der Tod in deinen Augen	Billy Tanauer	German	Television film
1999	Der Solist	Philip Lanart	German	Television series, 4 episodes 1999–2003
2000	U-571	Kapitänleutnant Günther Wassner	English	
2001	Hostile Takeover	Robert Fernau	German	
2001	The Knights of the Quest	Vanni Delle Rondini	English	
2002	Blade II	Eli Damaskinos	English	
2002	The Pianist	Hauptmann Wilm Hosenfeld	English	
2003	24	Max	English	Episodes: "Day 2: 6:00 a.m.–7:00 a.m." & "Day 2: 7:00 a.m.–8:00 a.m."
2004	In Enemy Hands	First Watch Officer Ludwig Cremer	English	
2004	Immortal	Nikopol	French; English	
2004	Downfall	SS-Gruppenführer Hermann Fegelein	German	
2004	Resident Evil: Apocalypse	Major Timothy Cain	English	
2004	The Karate Dog	Gerber	English	Television film
2004	Head in the Clouds	Major Franz Bietrich	English	
2004	Frankenstein	Dr. Victor Helios	English	Television film
2005	Schneeland	Aron	German	
2005	Have No Fear: The Life of Pope John Paul II	Pope John Paul II	English	Television film
2005	King Kong	Captain Englehorn	English	
2005	King Kong: The Video Game	Captain Englehorn	English	Video game
2006	Grimm Love	Oliver Hartwin	English	Best Actor, Sitges 2006 (shared with co-star Thomas Huber); Best Actor, PiFan 2007 (shared with co-star Thomas Huber)
2006	The Celestine Prophecy	Wil	English	
2006	24: The Game	Max	English	Video game
2007	Next	Mr. Smith	English	
2007	In Transit	Max	English	
2007	Eichmann	Adolf Eichmann	English	
2007	Bionic Woman	The Man	English	Television series (episode one)
2007	Why Men Don't Listen and Women Can't Read Maps	Paul	German	
2008	Wanted	Cross	English	
2008	Transsiberian	Kolzak	English	
2008	Mogadischu	Captain Jürgen Schumann	German	Television film
2008	The Sea Wolf	Captain Wolf Larsen	German	Television film
2008	Valkyrie	Otto Ernst Remer	English	
2009	The Young Victoria	King Leopold I of Belgium	English	
2009	King Conqueror	Archbishop of Tarragona	English	
2009	Wanted: Weapons of Fate	Cross	English	Video game
2009	FlashForward	Stefan Krieger	English	Television series
2010	The Frontier	Maximilian Schnell	German	Television film
2011	Cars 2	Professor Zündapp	English; German	Voice
2011	The Sinking of the Laconia	Admiral Dönitz	English; German	Television film – BBC Productions
2011	Jungle Child	Klaus Kuegler	German	
2011	The Cape	Gregor The Great	English	Television series
2011	Hostel: Part III	Flemming	English	Direct-to-DVD
2011	What a Man	Jens	German	
2012	Dracula 3D	Dracula	English	
2012	The River	Captain Kurt Brynildson	English	Television series
2013	Dracula	Abraham Van Helsing	English	Television series
2013	Stalingrad	Peter Kahn	Russian, German	
2013	Open Grave	Lukas	English	
2013	The Galapagos Affair: Satan Came to Eden	Friedrich Ritter	English	Narration/voice
2014	Plastic	Marcel	English	
2014	United Passions	Horst Dassler	English	
2014	Captain America: The Winter Soldier	Baron Wolfgang von Strucker	English	Uncredited cameo; mid-credits scene
2015	Avengers: Age of Ultron	Baron Wolfgang von Strucker	English	
2015	Hitman: Agent 47	Le Clerq	English	
2015	Spectre	Hannes Oberhauser	English	Photograph only
2016	Whiskey Tango Foxtrot	Airplane Passenger	English	
2016	Central Intelligence	The Buyer	English	
2016	Stratton	Grigory Barovsky	English	
2017	The Blue Mauritius	Holtz	English	
2017	The Saint	Rayt Marius	English	
2017	Jungle	Karl	English	
2017	A Taxi Driver	Jürgen Hinzpeter / Peter	Korean German	
2017	Berlin Station	Otto Ganz	English	TV series
2018	Dragged Across Concrete	Lorentz Vogelmann	English	
2018	Balloon	Oberstleutnant Seidel	German	
2018	Lore	Inspector Georg Reingruber	English	TV series
2018	Discarnate	Dr. Andre Mason	English	
2019	Project Blue Book	Wernher von Braun	English	TV series
2020	Waiting for Anya	Nazi Corporal	German	
2020	Westworld	Gerald	English	TV series
2020	Das Boot	Friedrich Berger	German	TV series
2020	Penny Dreadful: City of Angels	Hoss	English	TV series
2020	Greyhound	Captain of The U-Boat Grey Wolf	English	
2021	American Traitor: The Trial of Axis Sally	Joseph Goebbels	English	
2021	Biohackers	Baron Von Fürstenberg	German	TV series, season 2
2023	Infinity Pool	Detective Thresh	English	
2023	Last Sentinel	Sergeant Hendrich	English	
2023	Indiana Jones and the Dial of Destiny	Colonel Weber	English	
2023	Gran Turismo	Patrice Capa	English	
2023	Deliver Us	Father Saul	English	
2024	American Star		English	
2024	Upgraded		English	
2024	Putin		English	
TBA	Samo Lives		English	Post-production

== Awards ==
- Best Young Actor (Der Mitwisser), Max Ophüls Festival, 1991
- Best Actor (Rohtenburg), Sitges – Catalan International Film Festival, 2006
- Best Actor (Rohtenburg), Bucheon International Fantastic Film Festival, 2007
