= Democracy Park =

Park in Busan, South Korea

- Interactive map of Democracy Park
- Type: Historic park
- Location: Busan, South Korea
- Coordinates: 35°06′34.7″N 129°01′41.0″E
- Area: 20,337 square metres (218,910 sq ft)
- Opened: October 16, 1999
- Etymology: Democracy of Busan–Masan Democracy Movement
- Operator: Busan Democracy Park Construction Foundation
- Open: A.M 09:00 – P.M 05:00
- Status: Open all year
- Budget: ₩ 160 hundred million
- Public transit: City bus stop Central Park & Democracy Park
- Website: www.demopark.or.kr

Korean name
- Hangul: 민주공원
- Hanja: 民主公園
- RR: Minju gongwon
- MR: Minju kongwŏn

Democracy Park (Korean: 민주공원) is a historic park located in Central Park, Jung District, Busan, South Korea. It was established on October 16, 1999 in honor of the protestors who participated in the various democratic movements that led to the democratization of South Korea, including those of the April Revolution, Busan–Masan Uprising, and June Democracy Movement.

There is a memorial hall to the democracy movement in the park. There is also an amphitheater and various nature spots.
