= A Taxi Driver =

2017 South Korean historical film

- Theatrical release poster
- Hangul: 택시운전사
- Hanja: 택시運轉士
- RR: Taeksi unjeonsa
- MR: T'aeksi unjŏnsa
- Directed by: Jang Hoon
- Written by: Eom Yu-na
- Produced by: Park Un-kyoung; Han Seung-ryeong
- Starring: Song Kang-ho; Thomas Kretschmann; Yoo Hae-jin; Ryu Jun-yeol
- Cinematography: Go Nak-seon
- Edited by: Kim Sang-bum; Kim Jae-bum
- Music by: Jo Yeong-wook
- Production company: The Lamp
- Distributed by: Showbox
- Release date: 2 August 2017
- Running time: 137 minutes
- Country: South Korea
- Languages: Korean; English; German
- Budget: ₩15 billion (~US$13.8 million)
- Box office: US$87.1 million

A Taxi Driver (Korean: 택시운전사) is a 2017 South Korean political action drama film directed by Jang Hoon and written by Eom Yu-na, with Song Kang-ho starring in the lead role, alongside Thomas Kretschmann, Yoo Hae-jin, and Ryu Jun-yeol.

Based on a real-life story, the film follows a taxi driver from Seoul who unintentionally becomes involved in the events of the Gwangju Uprising in 1980. It draws on the experiences of German journalist Jürgen Hinzpeter of the ARD and his interactions with driver Kim Man-seob (based on Kim Sa-bok). As little was known about Kim at the time of production, many details of his life and the events outside Gwangju were dramatized. Hinzpeter's films revealed to the world that the South Korean government was carrying out mass killings against protestors in Gwangju, a city that was placed under curfew and cut off from the rest of the country.

The film was released on 2 August 2017 in South Korea. The film was positively received by critics, who praised its distinctive portrayal of the Gwangju Uprising, its emotional impact, and the depiction of the relationship between the main character and Hinzpeter. It was also selected as the South Korean entry for the Academy Award for Best Foreign Language Film at the 90th Academy Awards. The film was a notable commercial success: it was the second highest-grossing South Korean film of 2017, and currently stands as the sixteenth highest-grossing South Korean film in history.

== Background ==
=== Historical background ===
The film centres on the Gwangju Uprising, which took place from 18 to 27 May 1980 and is estimated to have resulted in up to 2,500 deaths. Its plot reflects the historical background of the event. The uprising arose from the ongoing struggle between the authoritarian government under Chun Doo-hwan, who had seized power in a coup in 1979, and citizens of South Korea, particularly university students, who wanted the country to democratize.

For many years, the uprising remained a taboo subject in South Korea, as those who had supported the government at the time continued to hold power in the country. According to scholar Jang Se Young from the Wilson Center, "books related to Gwangju were strictly censored or prohibited from even being published. Although a number of political dissidents and activists sought to inherit and develop the spirit of Gwangju, they were persecuted." Scholar Kim Yong Cheol stated, "the political legacies the Gwangju Uprising produced played a pivotal role in checking military intervention in politics during the democratic transition as well as in establishing the principle of civilian supremacy during the democratic transition period." Despite being banned, hundreds and thousands of news articles on what was happening in Gwangju were trying to be released by some of the journalists inside the city.

Efforts were made by some American journalists in order to inform the world about what was happening in Gwangju. Tim Shorrock published numerous U.S. government documents related to the uprisings that were happening in Gwangju, and Terry A. Anderson, who was a former Associated Press (AP) correspondent, covered the uprisings himself and provided an eyewitness account of the situation in 1980. People in the rest of South Korea were not aware of what was happening in Gwangju, until international media took hold of the story. Andrew David Jackson of Cambridge University argued that Jürgen Hinzpeter's relationship with South Korea's democratization movement "have become important weapons for the activist generation in an ongoing struggle over the memorialization of the Gwangju Uprising."

==== Candlelight protests ====
Candlelight protests through the fall and winter of 2016-17 marked the thirtieth year of significant democratic advancement in South Korean history, compared to the setting in which A Taxi Driver took place. Harvard sociology professor Paul Y. Chang argued in 2018 in KOAJ that "the contemporary candlelight protest industry draws on organizational and cultural resources first established in past democracy movements."

== Plot ==
In 1980, Kim Man-seob is a debt-laden and widowed single father who works as a taxi driver in Seoul. Overhearing another taxi driver bragging about a 100,000 won job to bring a foreign client to Gwangju, Man-seob steals the client, unaware of the events in Gwangju. The client is Jürgen "Peter" Hinzpeter, a German journalist wanting to report on the increasing civil unrest in Gwangju. The two men are stopped by soldiers as they approach Gwangju, but manage to enter with Peter posing as a businessman.

In Gwangju, they encounter a group of college students, who warm up to Peter and invite him aboard their pickup truck. Man-seob turns back, reluctant to be involved in the civil unrest. Along the way, he takes pity on an old woman and brings her to the local hospital to look for her son, who turns out to be one of the college students. Peter confronts Man-seob about abandoning him and offers to pay up part of the fare, but the college students and the local taxi drivers refuse to let Peter pay until Man-seob fulfils the agreed-upon trip.

Man-seob takes Peter and another student Jae-sik to a protest at the Provincial Office, where protesters greet the trio with food and gifts. Peter films the crackdowns that follow. Plainclothes Defense Security Command (DSC) officers attempt to arrest Peter, but the three evade capture. That evening, Man-seob's taxi breaks down and Tae-soo, one of the local taxi drivers, tows the taxi to his shop for overnight repair and lets the men stay at his place for the night. During dinner, the television station is bombed, and the three head there for Peter to film the turmoil. The officers recognize Peter and chase the three men; Man-seob is assaulted and Jae-sik is captured, but before he is taken away, he yells for Peter to share the footage with the world.

Distressed about his young daughter and unable to contact her, Man-seob departs for Seoul the next morning with the fake Gwangju license plates Tae-soo has given him. In Suncheon, he overhears reports of the events in Gwangju; the media claims North Korean infiltrators caused the chaos. Overwhelmed with guilt, he drives back to the hospital in Gwangju to find Peter in shock and Tae-soo mourning over Jae-sik's corpse. Peter, encouraged to continue filming by Man-seob, urges Man-seob to return to Seoul and see his daughter, but Man-seob insists on staying by his side.

At a street protest, soldiers open fire at civilians, including those rescuing the wounded. Man-seob and the other taxi drivers assist the wounded into the taxis and get them to safety. Departing for Seoul via a mountainous road, Man-seob and Peter arrive at an armed roadblock. The sergeant searches the car and finds the Seoul license plates but lets them go. The soldiers, receiving orders to stop any foreigners, open fire on the taxi but Man-seob breaks through. DSC officers give chase but the local taxi drivers intervene to allow Man-seob and Peter to escape at the cost of their lives. At the airport, they bid each other farewell. Before departing, Peter asks Man-seob for his name and phone number, but Man-seob writes "Kim Sa-bok" as his name and a cigarette company's phone number in Peter's notebook. Man-seob reunites with his daughter while Peter broadcasts his footage about the Gwangju Uprising. On subsequent trips to Seoul, Peter attempts to search for "Kim Sa-bok", but is unable to find him.

In 2003, Peter receives an award in South Korea for his report on the Gwangju Uprising. In his speech, he expresses his gratitude to "Kim Sa-bok" and hopes to see him again someday. Man-seob, still a taxi driver, reads a newspaper article about Peter's speech and achievements, murmuring that he is more grateful to Peter and that he misses him too. The film ends by stating that the real Peter died in 2016 without ever locating Man-seob, followed by a video of him expressing his thanks to "Kim Sa-bok" and his wish to see him again.

== Cast ==
- Song Kang-ho as Kim Man-seob

A widowed taxi driver who lives with his eleven year old daughter in a small house. He is an ordinary man from the working class who cares only about his family's livelihood and is uninterested in political issues. The character is loosely based on real-life taxi driver Kim Sa-bok, who ferried Jürgen Hinzpeter to Gwangju. Kim's whereabouts was unknown until the release of A Taxi Driver, when in September 2017, following the immense commercial and critical success of the film in South Korea, Kim's identity was finally confirmed by his son, Kim Seung-pil. The younger Kim shared with the media a photo of Jürgen Hinzpeter with his father and revealed that his father died of cancer in 1984, four years after the Gwangju events. Kim Sa-bok was reportedly 54 years old at the time of his death in December 1984.

- Thomas Kretschmann as Jürgen Hinzpeter

A German reporter. The character is based on the life of Jürgen Hinzpeter (1937–2016), the German journalist who filmed and reported on the Gwangju Uprising. A video of Hinzpeter appears at the end of the film, recorded several years prior to his death.

- Yoo Hae-jin as Hwang Tae-sool

A kindhearted local taxi driver.

- Ryu Jun-yeol as Gu Jae-sik

A naive university student who knows English.

- Park Hyuk-kwon as Reporter Choi
- Choi Gwi-hwa as Leader of Plainclothes DSC Officer
- Uhm Tae-goo as Sergeant first class Park of ROK Army 31st Infantry Division
- Yoo Eun-mi as Eun-jeong

Kim Man-seob's daughter.

- Cha Soon-bae as Driver Cha
- Shin Dam-soo as Driver Shin
- Ryoo Seong-hyeon as Driver Ryoo
- Park Min-hee as Kwon Joong-ryeong
- Lee Jung-eun as Hwang Tae-sool's wife
- Kwon Soon-joon as Kang Sang-goo
- Yoon Seok-ho as Hwang Tae-sool's son
- Heo Jeong-do as Seoul pregnant wife's husband
- Lee Bong-ryun as Seoul pregnant wife
- Lee Ho-cheol as Hong Yong-pyo
- Lee Young-yi as Hong Yong-pyo's wife
- Han Geun-sup as University student protester
- Hong Wan-pyo as University student protester
- Ko Chang-seok as Sang-goo's father
- Jeon Hye-jin as Sang-goo's mother
- Jung Jin-young as Reporter Lee
- Ryu Tae-ho as Gwangju newspaper director
- Jeong Seok-yong as President of car center in Seoul

== Production ==
Filming began on 5 June 2016, and ended on 24 October 2016.

== Release ==
The film was released on 2 August 2017, in South Korea. On the same day, the film had its international premiere at the Fantasia International Film Festival in Montreal, where Song Kang-ho was named Best Actor for his role in the film.

According to distributor Showbox, the film was released in North America on 11 August, Australia and New Zealand on 24 August, followed by the UK on 25 August. It then opened in Asian countries including Hong Kong, Taiwan and Japan in September.

On 13 August 2017, South Korean President Moon Jae-in viewed A Taxi Driver with Edeltraut Brahmstaedt, the widow of Jürgen Hinzpeter, and her family. A Blue House official said, "The movie shows how a foreign reporter's efforts contributed to Korea's democratization, and President Moon saw the film to honor Hinzpeter in respect for what he did for the country." After watching the film, President Moon commented:

"The truth about the uprising has not been fully revealed. This is the task we have to resolve. I believe this movie will help resolve it."

== Reception ==
=== Critical response ===
A Taxi Driver received positive reviews upon its release. The review aggregation website Rotten Tomatoes gives the film an approval rating of 97% based on 30 reviews, with an average rating of 7.3/10. The website's critical consensus reads "A Taxi Driver brings a ground-level perspective and a refreshingly light touch to a fact-based story with sobering implications." (Note: A Taxi Driver at Rotten Tomatoes. Retrieved 21 January 2019.) On Metacritic, which assigns a normalized rating based on reviews, the film has a score of 69 out of 100, based on 7 critics, indicating "generally favorable reviews". (Note: A Taxi Driver at Metacritic. Retrieved 2 September 2017.)

Sohing Yi Chan of Off Screen pointed out A Taxi Driver "as a film depicting a historical trauma", let the international audience, especially those who were not familiar with the event, be able to learn more about the truth. He also suggested that the film by adopting a classical Hollywood structure in narrative, gave audiences a chance to "experience the roller coaster of emotions that the film bombards the audience within a highly workmanlike fashion".

Jennie Kermode of Eye For Film shared the relevant ideas that the director didn't ignore the peaceful and lovely moments besides the violent, panic and horrible scenes, and it created a contrast in emotion and let audience keep shocking or plunge into consideration.

The cinematography in this film gained some more attention. Sheri Linden of The Hollywood Reporter went further that especially in the checkpoint scene and the mountain-road chase scene, the cinematography captured a "metal-on-metal violence" which was exaggerated in a "pastoral backdrop" that made Kim's decision and reaction more convincing. Sheri Linden also refuted the doubt on the other character Hinzpeter that his emotions might be overplayed in the last act, by evidencing the found footage from the real Hinzpeter by the end of the film, to show the proper performance in the film.

Some people have pointed out the formulaic elements and the weakness they brought to the film. Manfred Selzer of Asian Movie Web argued due to the heavy use of slow-motion, repetitions and soundtrack, some scenes of killing seemed too melodramatic; and the exciting scenes that the taxi chasing on mountain road although were some wonderful action scenes, did not work on well with the narrative, which seemed "out of place in the film and aren't captured that convincing either".

Simon Abrams of RogerEbert.com argued that Peter was depicted as a stiff supporting role to work for the narrative rather than a vivid character in the story, and each peak moment "feels too neat and schematic" that couldn't evoke sincere emotion. Sohing Yin Chan, in his review, questioned whether the emotional wave based on the balanced narrative made between drama and action genre could squeeze the audience's tear in an ethical way; he also believed those emotion are "too detached from all the action."

=== Box office ===
According to the Korean Film Council, on the first day of the release, a total of 698,090 tickets were sold, which earned US$4.5 million. The film was available on 1,446 screens and was shown 7,068 times across South Korea. By noon on the second day of its run, the film had passed the one million viewer mark.

On the third day, the total audience doubled, attracting two million viewers. The viewer numbers continued to rise as the tickets sale increased to four million by the fourth day.

A Taxi Driver has earned a total of US$30.7 million in five days with 4.38 million admissions. It has tied with The Admiral: Roaring Currents and The Battleship Island for the record of films which have surpassed four million viewers in the first five days of release. At the end of the first seven days, the film surpassed 5 million admissions. On the eleventh day since the opening the film recorded more than 7 million viewers.

A Taxi Driver became the most viewed South Korean film in 2017 in less than two weeks since its premiere by attracting more than 8 million audience. By 15 August 2017, it has earned a total of US$62.7 million with 9.02 million admissions.

By 20 August, in just 19 days since the film was released, A Taxi Driver surpassed 10 million viewers selling 10,068,708 tickets, earning a total of US$73 million. A Taxi Driver also became the first film of 2017 and the fifteenth Korean film overall to surpass the 10 million milestone. It is also Song Kang-ho's third film to have sold more than 10 million tickets.

The film topped the South Korean box office for three consecutive weekends. By 28 August, the film had attracted 11.4 million viewers. According to the film's distributor Showbox, the total attendance of the film surpassed the 12 million mark as of 9 September, becoming the tenth most-watched local film of all time in South Korea.

=== Reactions in China ===
A Taxi Driver is yet to be released in any form in China, though it received a theatrical release on 21 September 2017, in Hong Kong. While the film has received positive responses from Chinese audiences as well as users on their movie website Douban, it was pulled from its theaters on 3 October 2017, with the most likely reason being that a number of reviews had compared the film's content to the 1989 Tiananmen Square protests and massacre, which is strictly censored on media in China.

== Fictionalized elements ==
A Taxi Driver generally shows good accuracy on the memory of Gwangju Uprising, but several historical events depicted in the film are inaccurate or fictional.

The name of the taxi driver who helps Hinzpeter in the film is Kim Man-seob. He gives a false name, Kim Sa-bok, to Hinzpeter when he asks for Kim's name later in the film. However, in real life, the taxi driver's name was actually Kim Sa-bok. The only information known about the driver at the time during production was the name Kim Sa-bok, which was not registered as a taxi driver. Therefore, most of the character settings, including the "real" name Kim Man-seob, were created for the film.

Kim Sa-bok with Jürgen Hinzpeter and Ham Seok-heon, October 1975

In the film, Kim Man-seob is a self-employed taxi driver, while Kim Sa-bok was a hotel taxi driver. Thus, his car was not a green taxi shown in the film but a black sedan. Kim Man-seob and Jürgen Hinzpeter were actually accompanied by Hinzpeter's sound technician Henning Rumohr. The massive car chase sequence in which the taxi drivers in Gwangju help Kim Man-seob and Hinzpeter escape did not happen. In reality, they escaped from Gwangju without incident on the pretext of doing business.

In the film, Kim Man-seob communicates with Hintzpeter in short English and is unable to speak English fluently. However, Kim Sa-bok was able to speak fluent English. Kim Man-seob in the film shows no interest in demonstrations and doesn't know what's happening in Gwangju. In real life, Kim Sa-bok was actually interested in democratic movements and explained the situation in Gwangju to Hinzpeter. In the film, Jürgen Hinzpeter is described as the only foreign press personnel to document the events in Gwangju. However, other foreign news reporters including Henry Scott-Stokes from The New York Times and Terry A. Anderson from Associated Press were in Gwangju covering the movement.

The film ends with footage of an interview from November 2015 with the real Jürgen Hinzpeter describing his fruitless efforts to find his driver Kim Sa-bok again, after the events of Gwangju. Hinzpeter died in January 2016 without ever finding Kim Sa-bok. In 2017, the immense popularity of the film in South Korea brought the story of Kim Sa-bok to the attention of his son, Kim Seung-pil, who came forth publicly on Twitter and presented photographic evidence and details of his father's work with Jürgen Hinzpeter. The real Kim Sa-bok had a long term working relationship as a driver for Jürgen Hinzpeter, since at least 1975, and had died of liver cancer on 19 December 1984, at the age of 54. According to his son, Kim Sa-bok was traumatized by the terrible events at Gwangju and became a heavy drinker afterwards. Kim Sa-bok's death just a few years after the events depicted in the movie, and the fact that he was an independent driver not registered with any of the taxi companies were the reasons that Jürgen Hinzpeter had been unable to find him again when he returned later to Korea. The photographs presented by Kim Seung-pil were confirmed to be authentic by German broadcaster ARD and Hinzpeter's widow.

== Awards and nominations ==
| Award | Category | Recipient | Result | Ref. |
|---|---|---|---|---|
| 26th Buil Film Awards | Best Film | A Taxi Driver | Won | |
| 26th Buil Film Awards | Best Actor | Song Kang-ho | Won | |
| 26th Buil Film Awards | Best Cinematography | Go Nak-seon | Nominated | |
| 26th Buil Film Awards | Best Music | Jo Yeong-wook | Nominated | |
| 26th Buil Film Awards | Best Art Direction | Cho Hwa-sung and Jeong Yi-jin | Nominated | |
| 26th Buil Film Awards | Buil Readers' Jury Award | Jang Hoon | Won | |
| 21st Fantasia International Film Festival | Best Actor | Song Kang-ho | Won | |
| 54th Grand Bell Awards | Best Film | A Taxi Driver | Won | |
| 54th Grand Bell Awards | Best Director | Jang Hoon | Nominated | |
| 54th Grand Bell Awards | Best Actor | Song Kang-ho | Nominated | |
| 54th Grand Bell Awards | Best Screenplay | Eom Yu-na | Nominated | |
| 54th Grand Bell Awards | Best Music | Jo Yeong-wook | Nominated | |
| 54th Grand Bell Awards | Best Art Direction | Cho Hwa-sung and Jeong Yi-jin | Nominated | |
| 54th Grand Bell Awards | Best Costume Design | Cho Sang-kyung | Nominated | |
| 54th Grand Bell Awards | Best Cinematography | Go Nak-seon | Nominated | |
| 54th Grand Bell Awards | Best Editing | Kim Sang-bum and Kim Jae-bum | Nominated | |
| 54th Grand Bell Awards | Technical Award | A Taxi Driver | Nominated | |
| 54th Grand Bell Awards | Best Planning | A Taxi Driver | Won | |
| 37th Korean Association of Film Critics Awards | Top 10 Films | A Taxi Driver | Won | |
| 37th Korean Association of Film Critics Awards | Best Supporting Actor | Yoo Hae-jin | Won | |
| 1st The Seoul Awards | Grand Prize (Film) | A Taxi Driver | Nominated | |
| 1st The Seoul Awards | Best Actor (Film) | Song Kang-ho | Won | |
| 3rd Asian World Film Festival | Special Mention Award | Song Kang-ho | Won | |
| 3rd Asian World Film Festival | Best Film | A Taxi Driver | Won | |
| 3rd Asian World Film Festival | Humanitarian Award | A Taxi Driver | Won | |
| 38th Blue Dragon Film Awards | Best Film | A Taxi Driver | Won | |
| 38th Blue Dragon Film Awards | Best Director | Jang Hoon | Nominated | |
| 38th Blue Dragon Film Awards | Best Actor | Song Kang-ho | Won | |
| 38th Blue Dragon Film Awards | Best Supporting Actor | Yoo Hae-jin | Nominated | |
| 38th Blue Dragon Film Awards | Best New Actor | Ryu Jun-yeol | Nominated | |
| 38th Blue Dragon Film Awards | Best Screenplay | Eom Yu-na | Nominated | |
| 38th Blue Dragon Film Awards | Best Music | Jo Yeong-wook | Won | |
| 38th Blue Dragon Film Awards | Best Art Direction | Cho Hwa-sung and Jeong Yi-jin | Nominated | |
| 38th Blue Dragon Film Awards | Audience Choice Award for Most Popular Film | A Taxi Driver | Won | |
| 17th Director's Cut Awards | Special Mentions | A Taxi Driver | Won | |
| 17th Director's Cut Awards | Best New Actor | Choi Gwi-hwa | Won | |
| 25th Korea Culture & Entertainment Awards | Best Film | A Taxi Driver | Won | |
| 25th Korea Culture & Entertainment Awards | Best Director (Film) | Jang Hoon | Won | |
| 17th Korea World Youth Film Festival | Favorite Director | Jang Hoon | Won | |
| 17th Korea World Youth Film Festival | Favorite Actor for Middle-Aged Actor | Song Kang-ho | Won | |
| 4th Korean Film Producers Association Awards | Best Actor | Song Kang-ho | Won | |
| 12th Asian Film Awards | Best Supporting Actor | Yoo Hae-jin | Nominated | |
| 12th Asian Film Awards | Best Original Music | Jo Yeong-wook | Nominated | |
| 54th Baeksang Arts Awards | Grand Prize (Film) | A Taxi Driver | Nominated | |
| 54th Baeksang Arts Awards | Grand Prize (Film) | Song Kang-ho | Nominated | |
| 54th Baeksang Arts Awards | Best Film | A Taxi Driver | Nominated | |
| 54th Baeksang Arts Awards | Best Director (Film) | Jang Hoon | Nominated | |
| 54th Baeksang Arts Awards | Best Actor (Film) | Song Kang-ho | Nominated | |
| 54th Baeksang Arts Awards | Best Screenplay (Film) | Eom Yu-na | Nominated | |
| 23rd Chunsa Film Art Awards | Best Director | Jang Hoon | Nominated | |
| 23rd Chunsa Film Art Awards | Best Screenplay | Eom Yu-na | Nominated | |
| 23rd Chunsa Film Art Awards | Best Actor | Song Kang-ho | Nominated | |
| 23rd Chunsa Film Art Awards | Best Supporting Actor | Ryu Jun-yeol | Nominated | |

== See also ==
- List of submissions to the 90th Academy Awards for Best Foreign Language Film
- List of South Korean submissions for the Academy Award for Best International Feature Film
