= Gukpung 81 =

Gukpung 81(國風81) was a South Korean government-hosted festival in 1981.

The Fifth Republic of South Korea tried to reduce the violent image formed by Coup d'état of December Twelfth, Coup d'état of May Seventeenth and Gwangju massacre by Gukpung 81 Festival. During Gukpung 81 Festival, Chungmu gimbap became popular in South Korea.

== See also ==
- List of festivals in South Korea
- List of festivals in Asia
