= Gwangju Uprising =

1980 anti-government protest in South Korea

Gwangju Democratization Movement
- Part of the Minjung movement
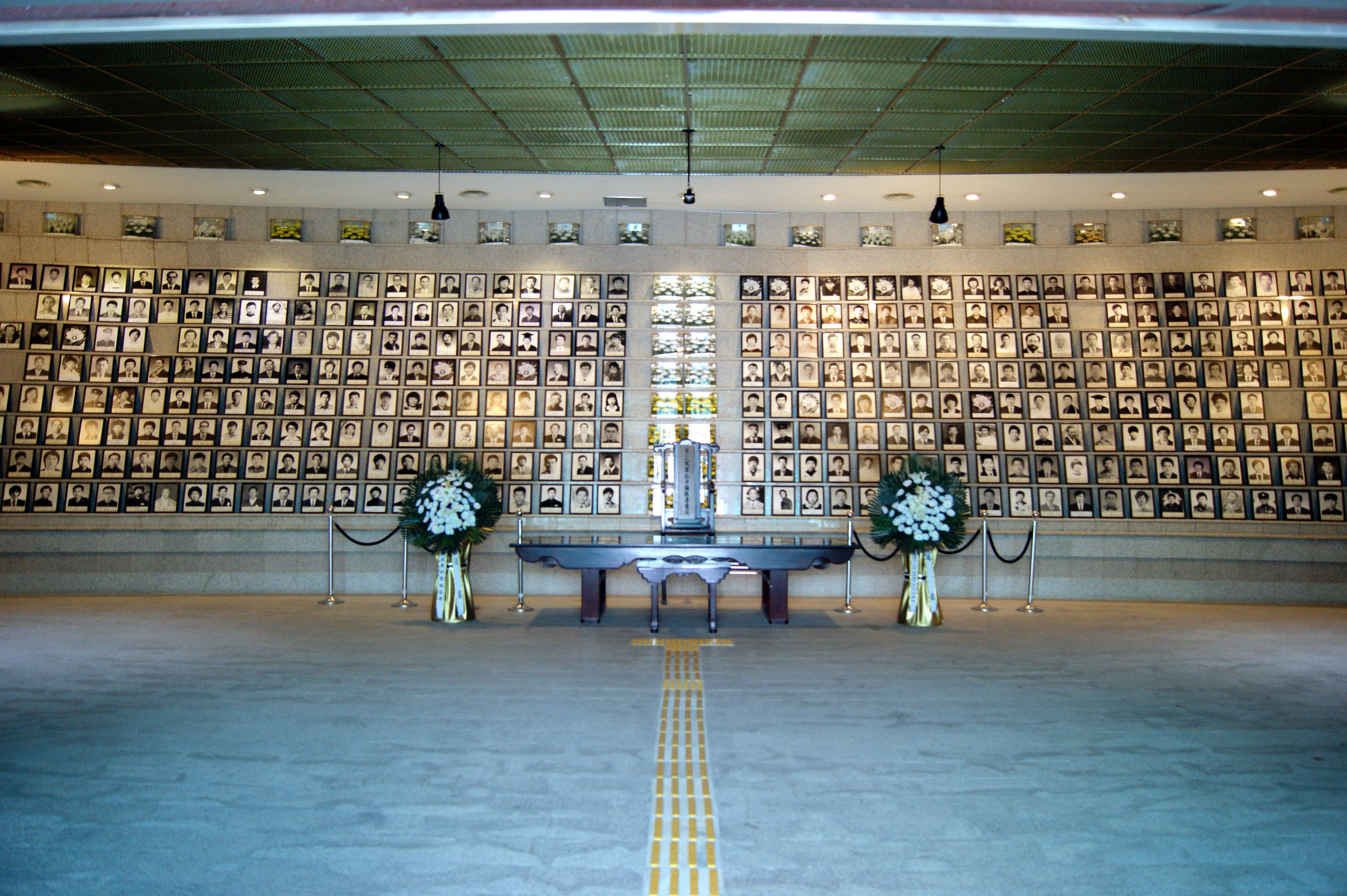
- Photos of the victims of the Gwangju massacre
- Date: 18–27 May 1980
- Location: Gwangju, South Korea
- Caused by: Coup d'état of May Seventeenth; Coup d'état of December Twelfth; Assassination of Park Chung Hee; Authoritarianism in South Korea; Social and political discontent in the Jeolla region
- Goals: Democratization; Freedom of the press; Freedom of speech; Freedom of association; End of dictatorial rule in South Korea
- Methods: Protests; Demonstrations; Civil disobedience; Armed uprising
- Result: Uprising suppressed: Pro-democracy protests escalate into an armed uprising after the South Korean government deploys the army to violently end demonstrations; End of the Seoul Spring; Long-term increase in support for the Minjung Movement, leading to the eventual end of South Korea's dictatorship in 1987; Kim Jong-ho becomes governor of South Jeolla Province on 28 May 1980

Parties
Government of South Korea; Military Security Command; Republic of Korea Army; ROKA Special Warfare Command; National Security Headquarters; Jeonnam Police Bureau; Hanahoe	Gwangju citizenry: Protesters; Citizens Army (Minjun); Citizens' Settlement Committee; Students' Settlement Committee; Republic of Korea Reserve Forces

Lead figures
(South Korea) Chun Doo-hwan; (South Korea) Roh Tae-woo; Jeong Ho-yong; Lee Hee-seong; Hwang Yeong-si; Yoon Heung-jung; Ahn Byung-ha (Note: Ahn Byung-ha, then-Director General of the police forces in Jeonnam, protested against military orders to suppress the citizenry with open fire. On May 26 he was removed from office and was detained by the Military Security Command, where he was subsequently interrogated and tortured.)	Jang Hyung-tae / South Jeolla Province governance; Largely decentralized leadership

Units involved
Initially: 7th Airborne Brigade; 11th Airborne Brigade; MSC 505th Defense Security Unit; Jeonnam Police Bureau; Gwangju Blockade: 3rd Airborne Brigade; 7th Airborne Brigade; 11th Airborne Brigade; 31st Infantry Division; 20th Mechanised Infantry Division; Combat Arms Training Command	Unknown (various civilian militias)

Number
Initially: 3,000 paratroopers; Gwangju Blockade: 23,000 troops	200,000 demonstrators (estimated combined strength)

Casualties and losses
22 soldiers killed (including 13 by friendly fire); 4 policemen killed (several more killed by the army after the uprising ended); 109 soldiers wounded; 144 policemen wounded; Total: 26 killed; 253 wounded	165 killed (confirmed casualties only); 76 missing (presumed dead); 3,515 wounded; 1,394 arrested
- Up to 600–2,300 killed; see casualties section.

- Gwangju Uprising
- Hangul: 5·18 민주화 운동
- Hanja: 五一八民主化運動
- Lit.: Five-One-Eight Democratization Movement
- RR: 5·18 minjuhwa undong
- MR: 5·18 minjuhwa undong

The Gwangju Uprising, also known in South Korea as the May 18 Democratization Movement (Korean: 5·18 민주화 운동), (Note: In South Korea the uprising is also known as the May 18 Gwangju Democratization Movement (5·18 광주 민주화 운동; 五一八光州民主化運動), the Gwangju Democratization Struggle (광주 민주화 항쟁; 光州民主化抗爭), the May 18 Democratic Uprising (5·18 민주화 운동; 五一八民主化運動), or the Gwangju Uprising (광주 항쟁; 光州抗爭).) was a series of student-led demonstrations that took place in Gwangju, South Korea, in May 1980, against the coup d'état of May Seventeenth by Chun Doo-hwan that strengthened his power. Chun had previously taken power and become military dictator through the coup d'état of December Twelfth at the end of 1979. He implemented martial law, arrested opposition leaders, closed all universities, banned political activities, and suppressed the press. The uprising was violently suppressed by the South Korean military who retook Gwangju. Between 600 and 2,300 people were killed.

The uprising began when Chonnam National University students demonstrating against martial law were fired upon, killed, beaten and tortured by South Korean soldiers. Some Gwangju citizens took up arms and formed militias, raiding local police stations and armories, and were able to take control of large sections of the city before soldiers re-entered the city and suppressed the uprising. While the South Korean government claimed that 165 people were killed in the massacre, scholarship on the massacre today estimates around 600 to 2,300 casualties. The military government of Chun labelled the uprising a "riot" and claimed, without evidence, that it was instigated by "communist sympathizers and rioters" acting at the behest of the North Korean government. The United States under the Carter administration, fearing that North Korea might intervene, gave approval to Chun to retake the city and also considered contingency plans to send extra U.S. troops to South Korea if the uprising spread to other cities.

In 1997, a national day of commemoration for the massacre was established for May 18 and a national cemetery for the victims was built. Later investigations confirmed the atrocities that had been committed by the army. In 2011, the document archive of the Gwangju Uprising was listed on the UNESCO Memory of the World International Register. In contemporary South Korean politics, denial of the Gwangju Massacre is commonly espoused by conservative and far-right groups.

== Background ==
The assassination of President Park Chung Hee on 26 October 1979 triggered a number of democracy movements that had previously been suppressed under Park's tenure. The abrupt end of Park's 18-year authoritarian rule left a power vacuum that created political and social instability. Park's successor, Choi Kyu-hah, had no real control over the government and Chun Doo-hwan, chief of the Defense Security Command (DSC), was able to seize control of the military in the coup d'état of December Twelfth. At the time, both the military and Chun denied any political motivations behind the coup and Chun had no clear influence over domestic politics.

In March 1980, at the beginning of a new school year, professors and students who had been expelled for pro-democracy activity returned to university and formed student unions. These unions led nationwide demonstrations against martial law and in support of democratization, free elections, human rights, labor rights, and freedom of the press. These protests culminated in the 15 May 1980 demonstration against martial law at Seoul Station which involved over 100,000 protesters. When the prime minister appealed for time to consider their demands, students returned to their campuses. On 16 May, opposition leaders Kim Dae-jung and Kim Young-sam held a joint press conference, echoing the students' demands.

Beginning in February 1980, the army issued orders to a number of units to undergo severe riot control training, called "Loyalty Training" (충정훈련; 忠情訓練). The training included harsh and unconscionable tactics, and was criticized as a factor behind the paratroopers' indiscriminate use of violence against the subsequent uprising.

On 17 May 1980, Chun forced the Cabinet to extend martial law to the whole country and in the process closed universities, banned political activities, and further curtailed the press. To enforce martial law, troops were dispatched to the country's main cities, including Gwangju, the provincial capital of South Jeolla Province. The same day, the DSC raided a national conference of student union leaders who had gathered to discuss their plans following the 15 May demonstration. Twenty-six politicians, including opposition leader and future president Kim Dae-jung were also arrested on charges of instigating protests. Chun sought to minimize the scale of protests by cutting off all communication to and from Gwangju and used disinformation to depict the protests as the result of communist instigators.

Gwangju was at the center of anti-government and pro-democracy demonstrations, as Kim Dae-jung was born in South Jeolla Province and over the years, built his political base there. Jeolla had historically been the target of exploitation because of its abundant natural resources (its vast, fertile plains made it the agricultural breadbasket of the Korean Peninsula) and the region was associated with political dissent and liberal activism. Historically, the region was the site of the anti-colonial Donghak Peasant Revolution (1894–1895), the Gwangju Student Independence Movement (1929), and the Yeosu–Suncheon rebellion (1948). Under the military dictatorship of Park Chung Hee from 1961 to 1979, the government favored the development of Park's native Gyeongsang Province, while Jeolla Province was neglected. Among the protests against Chun's imposition of martial law, the protests in Gwangju were the most intense.

== Uprising ==
=== 18–21 May ===
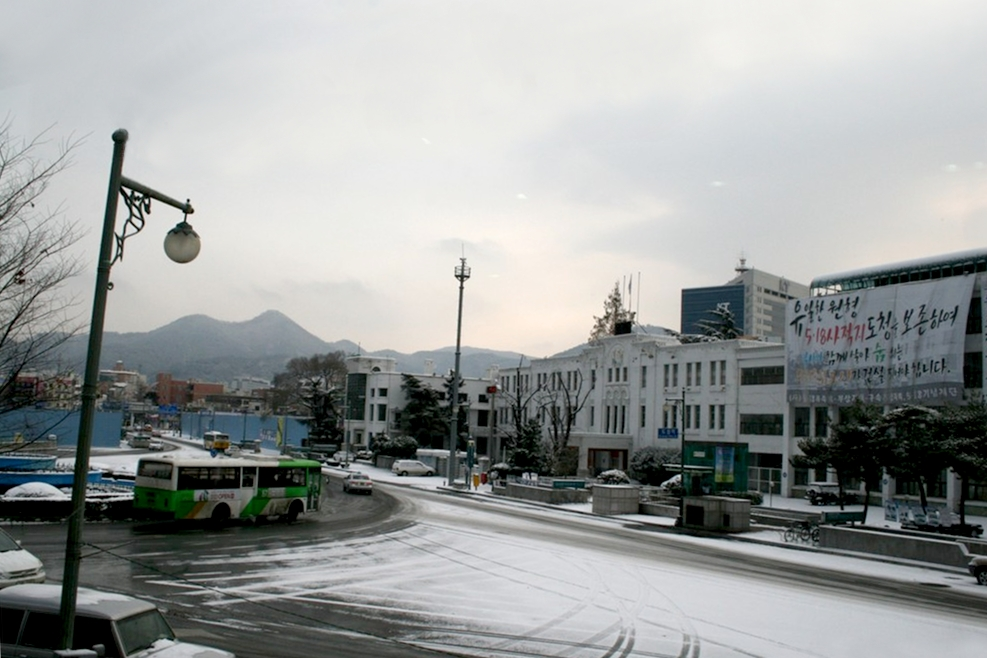
The former South Jeolla Provincial Office

On the morning of 18 May, students gathered at the gate of Chonnam National University to protest its closing. By 9:30 a.m., approximately 200 students had gathered in front of the school, opposed by 30 paratroopers. Sometime around 10 a.m., the soldiers charged against the students, moving the protest to downtown Gwangju, in front of the South Jeolla Province Provincial Office. Over the course of the day, the conflict broadened to around 2,000 participants. Although local police had initially handled the protests, by 4 pm, paratroopers from the Republic of Korea Special Warfare Command (ROK-SWC) took over. The arrival of 686 soldiers from the 33rd and 35th battalions of the 7th Airborne Brigade marked the beginning of a brutal and infamous phase of suppression of the uprising.

During this phase, South Korean soldiers indiscriminately clubbed demonstrators and bystanders. Soldiers used bayonets and rifle butts to attack, torture, and kill residents indiscriminately. Soldiers raided buildings unrelated to the demonstration, including hotels, cafés, and barbershops. The first known fatality was a 29-year-old deaf man named Kim Gyeong-cheol, who was clubbed to death despite being a bystander. About 5,000 students defied the martial law orders and battled with policemen and troops in the streets for several hours before a curfew was imposed. Scores of students were reported injured. The violent suppression of the protests by the ROK-SWC led the number of protesters to rapidly increase, exceeding 10,000 by 20 May.

As the conflict escalated, the army opened fire on the citizens, killing an unknown number of protesters near Gwangju Station on 20 May. The soldiers also held around 600 students at Chonnam University campus for three days without food or water. On the evening of 20 May, hundreds of taxis led a parade of buses, trucks, and cars to the Provincial Office in protest. In response, soldiers fired tear gas on them, pulled them out of their vehicles, beat and arrested them. This only led more drivers to join the protest. Many taxi drivers were assaulted while trying to transport the injured to the hospital. Some taxi drivers were shot after the drivers attempted to use the taxicabs as weapons or as barricades.

On the night of 20 May, protesters burned down the local MBC and KBS television stations, which had spread misinformation on the situation that had unfolded in Gwangju. Around 11 p.m., troops then apparently fired at random into crowds gathered near Chonnam University. Four policemen were killed at a police barricade near the Provincial Government Building after a car drove into them. Trucks filled with demonstrators and youths wearing headbands and covered faces raced around the cities, carrying the injured and transporting them to hospitals. Police stations were emptied out and the martial law troops took cover, as military vehicles were burned and protesters took over petrol stations.

The violence climaxed on 21 May. The city's main street was filled with ordinary citizens rather than students. Demonstrators shouted slogans demanding the release of Kim Dae-jung and called for the end of martial law. Some time around 1 p.m., the army fired on a crowd that had gathered in front of the South Jeolla Provincial Office building, causing numerous casualties. According to The New York Times, at Chonnam University Hospital, scores of bodies were seen being carried into the mortuary. Some witnesses alleged that 600 people had already been killed in the past four days, while the martial law authorities claimed that only 5 policemen and a civilian had died as of 21 May. Some citizens began to riot after unconfirmed reports spread that paratroopers had stripped down arrested students, hanged some dead bodies in a city park upside down and in some cases had violated women, including the elderly. One witness also claimed that he had seen soldiers in an armored personnel carrier dragging a student along by a rope tied to his neck.

In response, some protesters began raiding the Reserve Force armories and police stations in nearby towns, arming themselves with light machine guns, revolvers, M16 rifles and M1/M2 carbines. Later that afternoon, gunfights between civilian militias and the army broke out in the Provincial Office Square. By 5:30 p.m., the militias had acquired two light machine guns and used them against the army, forcing them to retreat from the downtown area. They also armed themselves with bats, knives, pipes, hammers, Molotov cocktails and other available weapons.

=== 22–25 May ===
==== Blockade of Gwangju ====
By 22 May, all troops retreated to the rural outskirts outside of the city to wait for reinforcements. These reinforcements consisted of troops from the 3rd Airborne Brigade, the 11th Airborne Brigade, the 20th Mechanized Infantry Division, the 31st Infantry Division, and the Combat Arms Training Command (CATC; 전투병과교육사령부; 戰鬪兵科敎育司令部). Reinforcements from the CATC primarily consisted of three subordinate units based in the unit's headquarters in Sangmudae: the Army Infantry School (육군보병학교; 陸軍步兵學校), the Army Artillery School (육군포병학교; 陸軍砲兵學校), and the Army Armor School (육군기갑학교; 陸軍機甲學校).

The army blocked all routes and communications to and from the city and fighting between militias and the army temporarily died down. Gwangju was sealed off in the Suncheon direction, and most, if not all other approaches were barred with roadblocks. There were unverified reports of dead bodies of students "piled up and tumbled together" in an underground shopping area. According to witnesses, an army jeep had its tires shot out in an underpass while entering Gwangju. The army sent in soldiers from other provinces into the surrounding areas with the official explanation being to guard against defections or sympathy with the local population.

On 23 May, soldiers fired at a bus that attempted to break out of the city in Jiwon-dong, killing 15 of the 18 passengers, and summarily executing two wounded passengers. That same night, there were unconfirmed reports that some paratroopers died while lining both sides of the road near an armory outside the city when a group of students planning to steal weapons crept between the lines of the troops before realizing that they were surrounded. The students opened fire to cover their escape while paratroopers returned fire, with unknown casualties.

On 24 May, two teenage boys, Jeon Jae-su and Bang Gwang-beom, attempted to swim across the Wonje Reservoir, but the 11th Airborne Brigade Troopers opened fire and killed them. At 1:55 p.m., the South Korean military suffered the greatest number of casualties when troops from the 11th Airborne Brigade 63rd Special Operations Battalion and the CATC Army Infantry School Training Battalion mistakenly fired at each other in Songam-dong, resulting in the deaths of 13 soldiers. Troops from the 11th Airborne Brigade indiscriminately murdered unarmed civilians and residents near the village in Songam-dong and plundered nearby stores. Martial Law Command misinterpreted friendly fire at Songam-dong as the work of insurgents within the army, as the Airborne Brigade Troopers were using a different communications channel.

==== Settlement Committees ====
Meanwhile, in the liberated city of Gwangju, the Citizens' Settlement Committee and the Students' Settlement Committee were formed. The former was composed of about 20 preachers, lawyers, and professors and negotiated with the army, demanding the release of arrested citizens, compensation for victims, and the prohibition of retaliation in exchange for the disarmament of militias. The latter committee was formed by university students and took charge of funerals, public campaigns, traffic control, withdrawal of weapons, and medical aid.

- Kim Jong-bae (김종배) - Chief Executive
- Heo Kyu-jeong (허규정) - Secretary of Home Affairs
- Jeong Sang-yong (정상영) - Secretary of External Affairs
- Yoon Sang-won (윤상원) - Spokesperson for Militia
- Park Nam-sun (박남선) - Director of Militia Operations
  - Yoon Seok-ru (윤석루) - Militia QRF (Quick Reaction Force) Commander
  - Lee Jae-ho (이재호) - Militia QRF Deputy Commander
- Kim Jun-bong (김준봉) - Director of Investigations
- Gu Seong-ju (구성주) - Director of Provisions Supply

At a peaceful rally on 22 May attended by 100,000 residents, a spokesman for the demonstrators demanded that the government keep the troops out of the city until order was restored, the release of 900 people who were arrested, compensate the families of the victims and refrain from retaliating against the demonstrators after the protests died down.

On 25 May, student leaders began calling on the United States to bring an end to the bloodshed by instructing U.S. Ambassador William H. Gleysteen to act as an intermediary to arrange a truce. They also requested the Korean Red Cross to send a mission into the city to inspect the casualties, provide medical supplies and press for government aid.

Order in the city was well maintained, but negotiations came to a deadlock as the army urged the militias to immediately and unconditionally disarm themselves. Hardline rebels reportedly demanded that Chun be dismissed by President Choi, which the military junta rejected. This created division within the Settlement Committees between those who wanted immediate surrender and those who called for continued resistance until their demands were met. After heated debates, those calling for continued resistance eventually won out.

==== Protests in other regions ====
As the news of the bloody crackdown spread, protests against the government broke out in nearby regions, including in Hwasun County, Naju, Haenam County, Mokpo, Yeongam County, Gangjin County, and Muan County, all in South Jeolla. There were reports of protesters heading to coal mines in Hwasun County to seize crates of explosives, while in the port city of Mokpo, people armed with rifles fired into the air while troops closed in on the city.

While protests ended peacefully in most regions, protests in Haenam ended in gunfights between armed protesters and troops. Most of these protests died down by 24 May, although protests in Mokpo continued until 28 May.

=== 26 May ===
By 26 May, the army was ready to reenter Gwangju. Members of the Citizens' Settlement Committee unsuccessfully tried to block the army's advance by lying down in the streets. Hundreds of people gathered outside government buildings with some lined up at the door to donate blood, while others pressed into a gymnasium where bodies were laid out. Following news of the imminent attack, civil militias gathered in the Provincial Office and made preparations to make a last stand. According to one account, militants, some masked and helmeted, formed a human chain around their headquarters which they had mined with explosives.

=== 27 May ===
On 27 May, at 4:00 a.m., the Martial Law Command executed Operation Sangmu-Chungjeong (Korean: 상무충정작전; Hanja: 尙武忠正作戰; lit. 'Operation Martialism and Loyalty') to quell the protests. The operation mobilized members of the 3rd Airborne Brigade, the 7th Airborne Brigade, and the 11th Airborne Brigade Troopers, armed with M16 rifles and stun grenades. The soldiers disguised themselves with flak vests, leaf camouflage helmets with white bands, and ordinary army infantryman combat uniforms that were missing insignias and patches. Three Airborne Brigades were the vanguard of the operation, while the 20th Mechanised Infantry Division and the 31st Infantry Division joined the operation as backup reinforcements. Troops from three subordinate units of the CATC, the Army Infantry School, the Army Artillery School, and the Army Armor School, maintained their positions in the blockade during the operation. The soldiers moved into the downtown and defeated the civil militias within 90 minutes.

=== Role of the police ===
The National Security Headquarters initially dealt with the protests, but were soon supplemented by paratroopers from the 7th Airborne Brigade, before being fully taken over and ordered to evacuate to allow the army. The police suffered some of the first casualties of the massacre when four policemen were killed during a car-ramming attack. However, the martial law forces were also in conflict with the Gwangju local police over the handling of the protests.

The Commissioner General of the Jeonnam Provincial Police, Ahn Byung-ha, refused to order the police to open fire on civilians as instructed by Chun Doo-hwan. As a result, he was replaced as police chief and was tortured by the Army Counterintelligence Corps, which caused his death eight years later. In addition, some paratroopers assaulted the police and some residents testified witnessing police officers being chased down by the military.

== Casualties ==
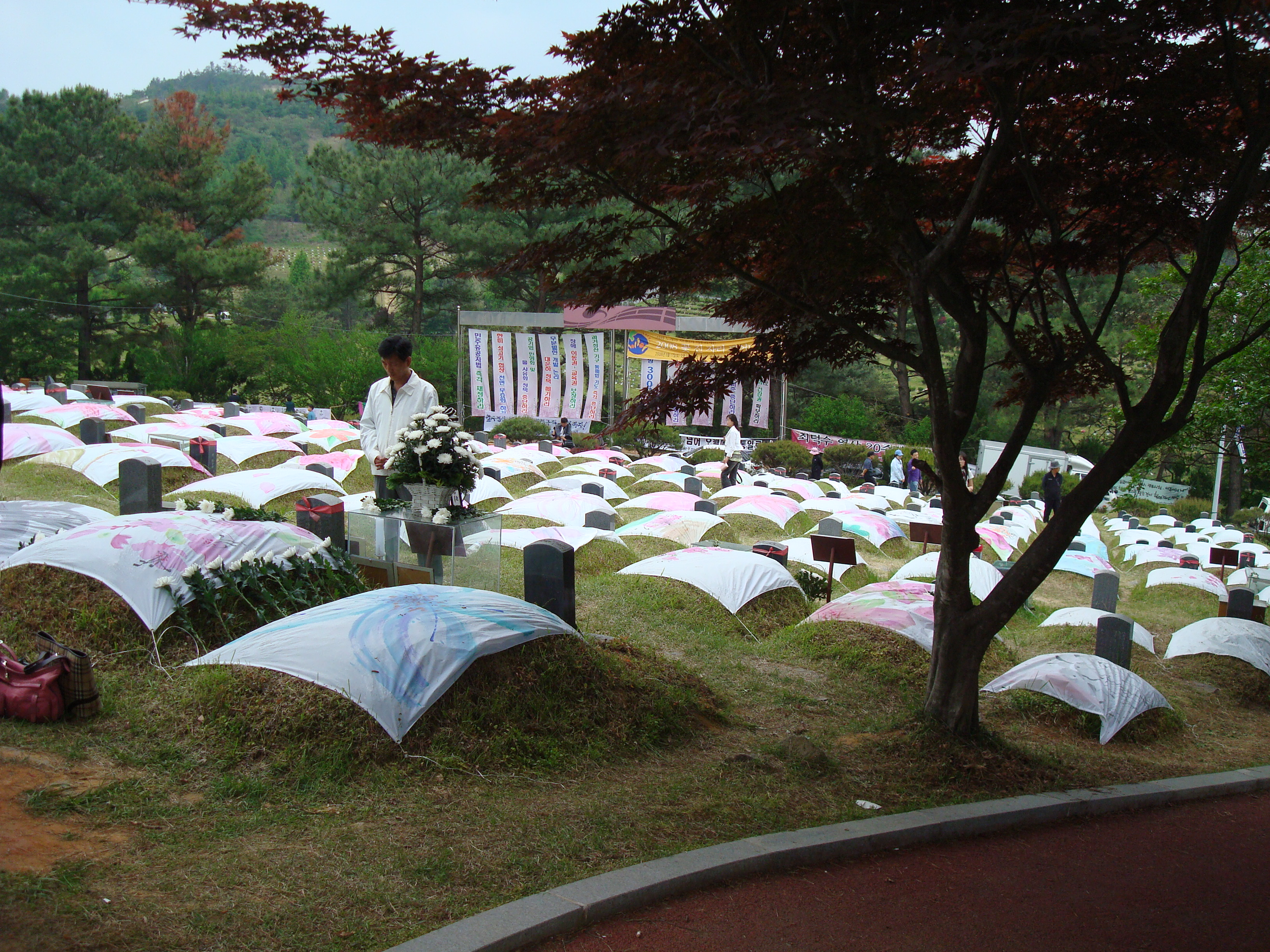
The victims of the Gwangju Massacre were buried at the May 18 National Cemetery.

There is no universally accepted death toll for the Gwangju Massacre. Records of death for the city in May 1980 were an estimated 2,300 above the historical averages and the death toll has been estimated to be anywhere between 1,000 and 2,000 people. Estimates for the number of civilians wounded also vary heavily, including figures anywhere from 1,800 to 3,500 people.

Shortly after the massacre, the government's Martial Law Command released an official death toll at 144 civilians, 22 soldiers and 4 police and then 127 civilians, 109 troops and 144 police wounded. Individuals who attempted to dispute these figures were liable for arrest for "spreading false rumors".

According to the May 18 Family Association, at least 165 people died between 18 and 27 May, while another 76 are still missing and presumed dead. Twenty-two soldiers and four policemen were killed during the massacre, including 13 soldiers who were killed by friendly fire at Songam-dong. The number of police casualties is likely to be higher, due to reports of police officers being killed by soldiers for releasing captured protesters.

== Aftermath ==
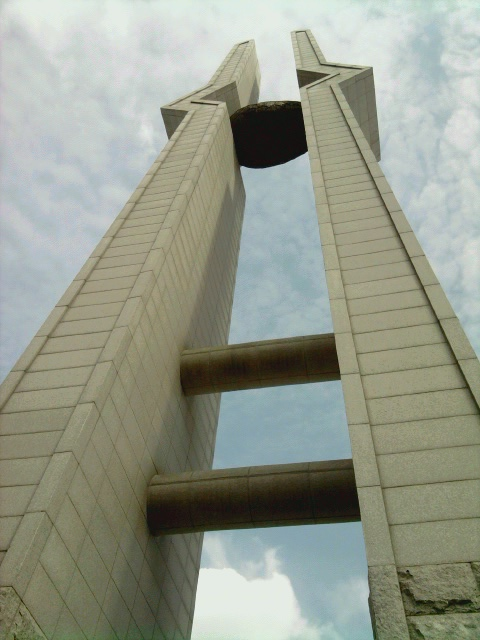
May 18 Minjung Struggle Memorial Tower

The government denounced the uprising as a rebellion instigated by Kim Dae-jung alongside North Korean-backed sympathizers in the country. Kim was convicted and sentenced to death, although his sentence was commuted following the intervention of U.S. Presidents Jimmy Carter and Ronald Reagan. A total of 1,394 people were arrested for their involvement in the Gwangju Uprising, and 427 were indicted. Seven people received death sentences and twelve received life sentences. Estimates following the massacre suggested that more than 200,000 people participated in the uprising, facing roughly 3,000 paratroopers and 18,000 police officers.

Handcarts and garbage trucks carried 137 bodies from the massacre to the Old Mangweol-dong Cemetery on the outskirts of Gwangju. The state established the New Mangweol-dong Cemetery to commemorate Gwangju's history.

The Gwangju Uprising has had a profound impact on South Korean politics. Chun Doo-hwan, who was already unpopular because of his military coup, faced threats to his legitimacy following the events that unfolded in Gwangju. The movement preceded other democratic movements during the late 1980s that pressured the regime into democratic reforms and paved the way for the election of Kim Dae-jung as President in 1997, the first opposition candidate to win the office.

In 1995, in response to public pressure, the National Assembly passed the Special Law on May 18 Democratization Movement, which enabled the prosecution of those responsible for the Coup d'état of December Twelfth and the suppression of the Gwangju Uprising even though the statute of limitations had been exceeded.

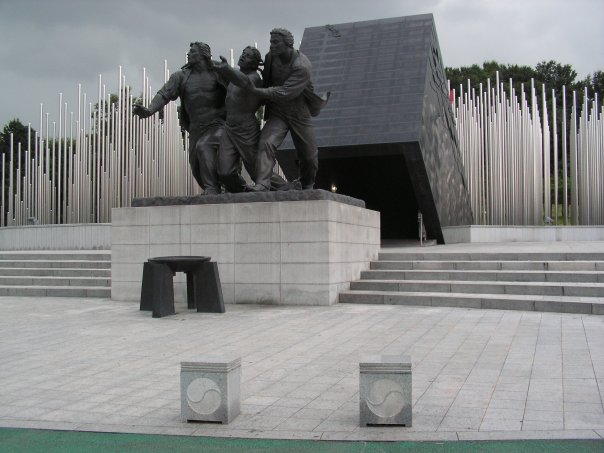
A memorial statue at the May 18th National Cemetery in Gwangju.

On 3 December 1995, Chun, his ally and former President Roh Tae-woo, and 15 others were arrested on charges of conspiracy and insurrection. On 26 August 1996, the Seoul District Court issued a death sentence to Chun, but his sentence was commuted to life imprisonment and a fine of ₩220 billion. Former President Roh Tae-Woo was sentenced to 22.5 years, which was reduced to 17 years on appeal. On 17 April 1997, the judgment was accepted by the Supreme Court of Korea. Chun was officially convicted of leading an insurrection, conspiracy to commit insurrection, taking part in an insurrection, illegal troop movement orders, dereliction of duty during martial law, murder of superior officers, attempted murder of superior officers, murder of subordinate troops, leading a rebellion, conspiracy to commit rebellion, taking part in a rebellion, and murder for the purpose of rebellion, as well as assorted crimes relating to bribery. However, on 22 December 1997, all of the people convicted in the trials were pardoned in the name of national reconciliation by President Kim Young-sam on the advice of President-elect Kim Dae-jung.

Starting in 2000, the May 18 Memorial Foundation has offered an annual Gwangju Prize for Human Rights to notable defenders of human rights in memory of the massacre.

On 25 May 2011, the documents of the Gwangju Uprising were listed on the UNESCO Memory of the World International Register. Following its inclusion, the Gwangju Metropolitan City government established May 18 Archives and passed the Management Act on the Archives of May 18 Gwangju Democratization Movement. Between 2014 and 2015, the Gwangju Metropolitan City government also re-modeled the former Gwangju Catholic center building to conserve its former state.

=== Role of North Korea ===
The military dictatorship then and conservative presidential administrations since have long asserted that the uprising was secretly organized by North Korean military officers and was therefore a communist-backed uprising that deserved to be put down with force. However, subsequent declassified U.S. diplomatic and military intelligence cables repudiated any notion of North Korean involvement. Communications intercepts uncovered that the North Korean leadership intended only to intervene should the protests develop into a nationwide popular revolt and South Korea be engulfed in revolution, but would remain neutral otherwise. No other substantive evidence exists that North Korea intervened.

=== Anti-Americanism ===
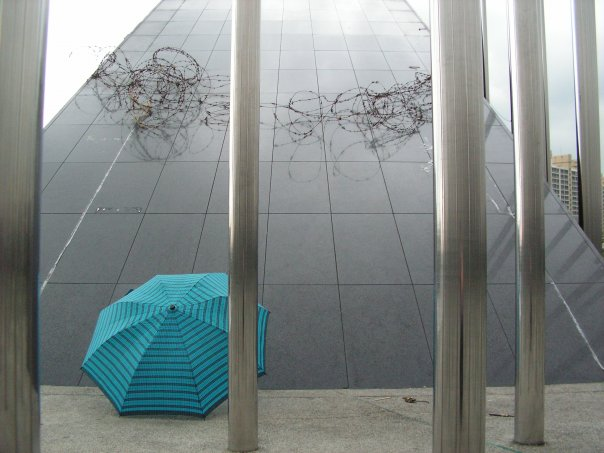
Barbed wire at the back of the memorial

In the 1980s, South Korea saw a marked rise in Anti-American sentiment. Many scholars have traced this shift to the United States' support for Chun's autocratic government and its involvement in the suppression of the Gwangju Uprising. According to Bruce Cumings:

Gwangju convinced a new generation of young [Koreans] that the democratic movement had developed not with the support of Washington, as an older generation of more conservative Koreans thought, but in the face of daily American support for any dictator who could quell the democratic aspirations of the Korean people. The result was an anti-American movement in the 1980s that threatened to bring down the whole structure of American support for the ROK. American cultural centers were burned to the ground (more than once in Gwangju); students immolated themselves in protest of Reagan's support for Chun.

Fundamental to these beliefs is the perception of U.S. complicity in Chun's rise to power and in the Gwangju Massacre. Although William H. Gleysteen, then U.S. Ambassador to South Korea, stated in a letter to The New York Times that the United States authorized the Republic of Korea Army's 20th Division to retake Gwangju and restore martial law, the United States government has denied these claims. The United States has consistently denied any foreknowledge of the unit's deployment, and has stated that the U.S. government would regardless have no right to interfere in the actions of the South Korean government.

== Re-evaluation ==
At the Mangwol-dong cemetery in Gwangju, survivors of the demonstrations and bereaved families have held an annual memorial service, called the May Movement, on the anniversary of the massacre. Many pro-democracy demonstrations in the 1980s demanded official recognition of the massacre and punishment for those responsible.

The first official re-evaluation of the massacre began after the reinstatement of direct presidential elections in 1987. In 1988, the National Assembly held a public hearing on the uprising, officially renaming the events to the "Gwangju Uprising" or the "Gwangju People's Uprising".

=== Developments from 1997 to 2013 ===
In 1997, 18 May was declared an official memorial day. In 2002, a law privileging bereaved families took effect, and the Mangwol-dong cemetery was elevated to the status of a national cemetery.

On 18 May 2013, President Park Geun-hye attended the 33rd anniversary of the Gwangju Uprising and stated, "I feel the sorrow of family members and the city of Gwangju every time I visit the National May 18 Cemetery", and that "I believe achieving a more mature democracy is a way to repay the sacrifice paid by those [killed in the massacre]."

=== 2017 investigation ===
In May 2017, newly elected South Korean President Moon Jae-in announced his plans to re-open investigations into the South Korean government's role in the suppression of the uprising.

In February 2018, it was revealed for the first time that the army had used McDonnell Douglas MD 500 Defender and Bell UH-1 Iroquois helicopters to fire on civilians. Defense Minister Song Young-moo delivered an apology. On 7 November 2018, Defense Minister Jeong Kyeong-doo issued another apology for the South Korean military's role in suppressing the uprising and acknowledged that soldiers had engaged in acts of sexual violence during the crackdown.

In May 2019, Kim Yong-Jang, a former intelligence officer at the 501st Military Intelligence Brigade of the U.S. Army testified that Chun Doo-hwan personally ordered troops to shoot protesters based on the intelligence he saw at the time. According to Kim, Chun secretly came to Gwangju on 21 May 1980, by helicopter to meet four military leaders including commander of special operations Chung Ho-Yong and colonel of the Gwangju 505 security unit Lee Jae-woo. Kim also testified that there were undercover soldiers among the Gwangju citizens acting as agents provocateurs aiming to discredit the movement. These soldiers were "in their 20s and 30s with short hair, some wearing wigs" and "their faces were burnt and some wore worn-out clothes".

=== 2020 Truth Commission ===
In May 2020, 40 years after the uprising, the independent May 18 Democratization Movement Truth Commission was launched to investigate the crackdown and the use of military force. Under legislation passed in 2018, it operated for two more years, with a one-year extension allowed if necessary. In an interview marking the massacre's 40th anniversary and following Democratic Party's (DP) landslide victory in the 2020 South Korean legislative election, President Moon announced his support for inscribing the historic value and significance of the Gwangju Uprising in a new constitution of South Korea.

=== May 18 Special Act ===
With its supermajority in the National Assembly after the 2020 South Korean legislative election, the DP also implemented a series of reforms in December 2020, including revisions to the May 18 Special Act to penalize those involved in making false claims about the Gwangju Uprising.

=== U.S. involvement ===
Documents available since 1996 describe how, after a White House Meeting on May 22, the U.S. commander in Korea released Korean troops from the U.S.-South Korean joint command to retake the city of Gwangju. The Pentagon also asked for a delay on the final assault in order to dispatch additional support planes to the peninsula. Declassified United States Department of State documents in July 2021, requested by the South Korean government, revealed that the U.S. ambassador William H. Gleysteen was informed by the Chief Presidential Secretary Choi Kwang-soo of the plans for an army crackdown a day before it took place.

The released documents showed that Gleysteen expressed Washington's concerns over growing anti-American sentiment in the Gwangju area, amid broadcasts asserting that the U.S. was involved in the military crackdown. Prior to the declassification, the notion of American foreknowledge and involvement in the Gwangju Massacre had been officially denied by the United States.

The US did not oppose the military crackdown on Gwangju. The Carter administration acted "in the middle of both active collaboration and reluctant consent with the military junta." According to American journalist Tim Shorrock, the Carter administration had allowed Chun to deploy regular army troops under the ROK/US Combined Forces Command to put down the rebellion, and subsequently carefully planned to push Chun toward "moderation" by approving a $600 million Export-Import Bank loan to South Korea to buy American nuclear power equipment and engineering services. Richard Holbrooke and Zbigniew Brzezinski were instrumental in persuading Carter — who was deeply suspicious of the Korean military — that his only alternative was to support Chun over the democratic aspirations of the Korean people, a decision that to many South Koreans and others in Asia was a tragic and incomprehensible betrayal.

At the time, Chun Doo-hwan's military regime, in an attempt to justify the violent crackdown, falsely labeled the pro-democracy protesters—who had no ties to North Korea—as a pro-communist rebellion and deceived the public by claiming that the military regime had the support of the U.S. government.

== In popular culture ==
=== Literature ===
- Dance Dance Revolution (2007), a poem by Cathy Park Hong
- There a Petal Silently Falls: Three Stories (2008) by Choe Yun
- The Old Garden (2009), a novel by Hwang Sok-yong
- The Seed of Joy (2015), a novel by William Amos
- Human Acts (2016), a novel by Han Kang
- Jenny's Attic (2020), a novel by Jennifer Huntley Mario

=== Compositions ===
- "Exemplum in memoriam Kwangju" for orchestra by Isang Yun
- 518-062 by Gloss and Naksyeon of D-Town (2010)

=== Television ===
- Sandglass (1995)
- 5th Republic (2005)
- Youth of May (2021)
- Doctor X (2026)

=== Film ===
- Symphonic Poem for the Beloved (1991)
- A Petal (1996), adapted from the short story "There a Petal Silently Falls" by Choe Yun
- Peppermint Candy (1999)
- The Old Garden (2006), adapted from the novel "The Old Garden" by Hwang Sok-yong
- May 18 (2007)
- Sunny (2011)
- 26 Years (2012), based on the 2006 manhwa by Kang Full
- National Security (2012)
- The Attorney (2013)
- 1987: When the Day Comes (2017)
- Excavator (2017)
- A Taxi Driver (2017)
- The Man Standing Next (2020)
- Hunt (2022)
- Swallow (2022) by Lee Song-hee-il

=== Music videos ===
- "That's My Fault" and "It's Over" by Speed, featuring Kang Min-kyung and Park Bo-young, respectively
- "May" by Wings of the ISANG

== See also ==
- Busan–Masan Uprising
- Busan American Cultural Service building arson
- Gukpung 81
- Incheon Uprising
- June Democratic Struggle
- Jürgen Hinzpeter
- May 18 Memorial Foundation
