= May 18th National Cemetery =

Cemetery in Gwangju, South Korea

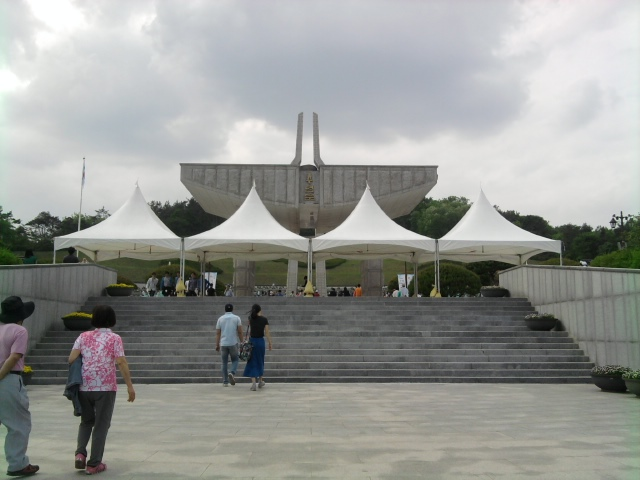
- Gate Cherishing the Memory of the Deceased
- Interactive map of May 18th National Cemetery

Details
- Established: 1997
- Location: Gwangju
- Country: Korea
- Coordinates: 35°14′5″N 126°56′16″E
- Type: National Cemetery
- Size: 166,201 square metres (1,788,970 ft^{2})
- No. of interments: Over 700
- Website: 518.mpva.go.kr

May 18th National Cemetery (Korean: 국립5·18민주묘지; Hanja: 國立5·18民主墓地) is a cemetery for those who participated in the Gwangju Uprising. Built by the government of South Korea in 1997, it is located in Gwangju. Every May, on the anniversary of the uprising, it is common for citizens to visit the cemetery to honor the dead.

== History ==
The Gwangju Uprising, also known as May 18 Democratic Uprising, was a democratic movement in South Korea directed against the Chun Doo-hwan government, which violently suppressed Gwangju citizens. Under the Kim Young-sam administration, there was a movement to make May 18th National Cemetery a democratic shrine.

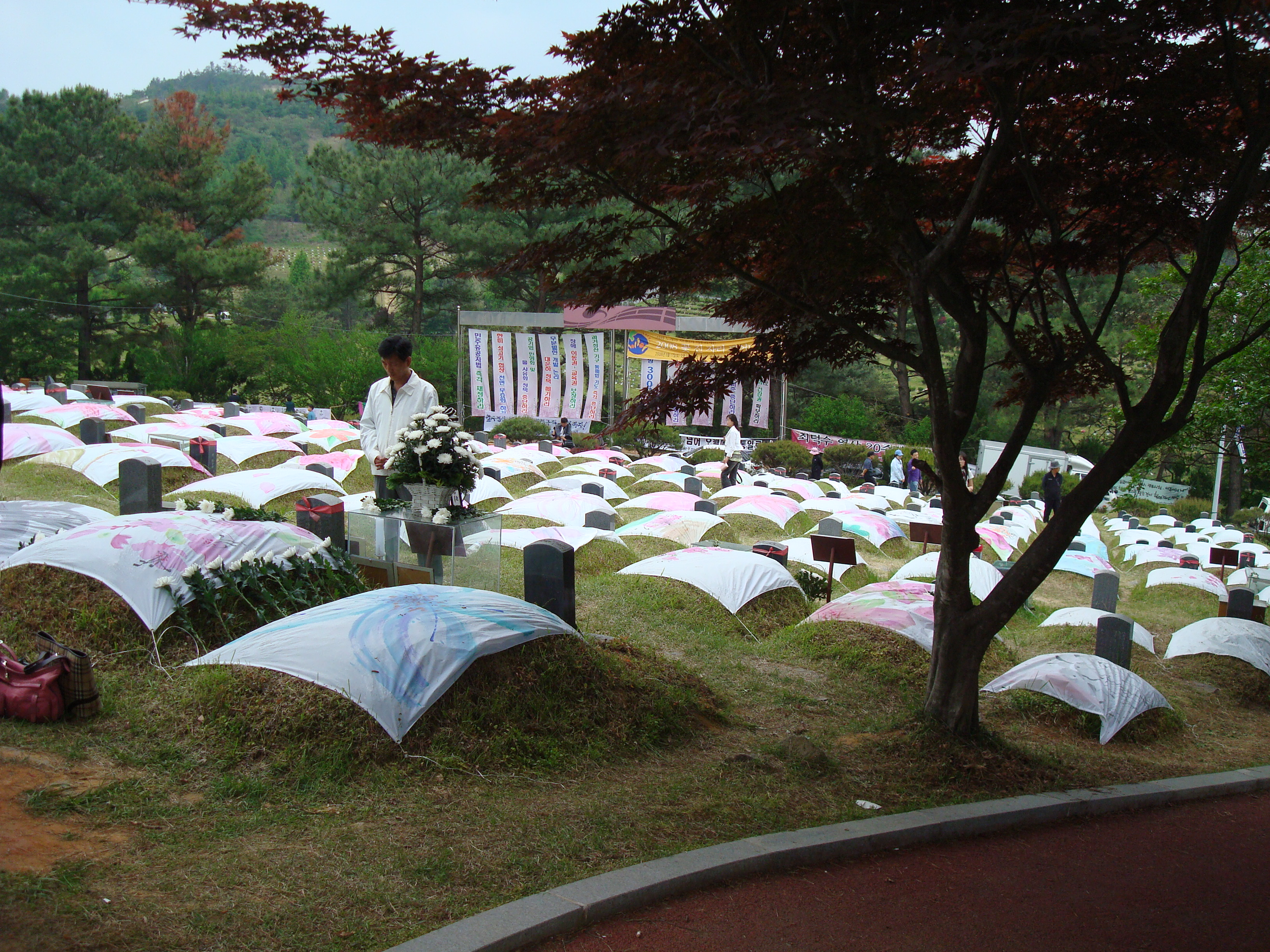
Mangweol-dong Cemetery

The previous May 18th Cemetery, or the "Mangweol-dong Cemetery" (구묘역), was the former burial site of those who died during the May 18th Democratic Uprising and the proceeding democratic movement. Some of those interred there for 17 years were delivered to the cemetery in garbage trucks. Due to the cemetery's reputation as a Mangweol-dong, a "holy ground for democracy", the military had plans to destroy the graveyard. Those plans never came to fruition.

Following the democratization of Korea, a plan to create a National Cemetery was announced in 1993, giving rise to the New National Cemetery for the May 18th Democratic Uprising. Construction began in November 1994 and the new cemetery was opened in May 1997. Bodies from the Mangweol-dong Cemetery were exhumed and re-interred in the new location, while the old cemetery was restored to its former state. The new cemetery was promoted to the status of a national cemetery by presidential decree by Kim Dae-jung on July 27, 2002, and renamed the National Cemetery for the May 18th Democratic Uprising on January 30, 2006. An annual commemoration is held each May, in which people pay their respect to those who died at both the old and new cemeteries.

Taryn Assaf observed that

The two cemeteries came to represent two different aspects of the uprising: the new, designed to represent a commemoration of past sacrifices and the old marked by the symbolism of a continuing struggle. Interesting to note is the suggestion evident in the process of naming. Equating 'new' with 'official' and 'old' with 'unofficial' serve to influence popular conception of the significance of the different actors involved in the uprising, their place in history, their ideologies and their legacies.

== Burials ==
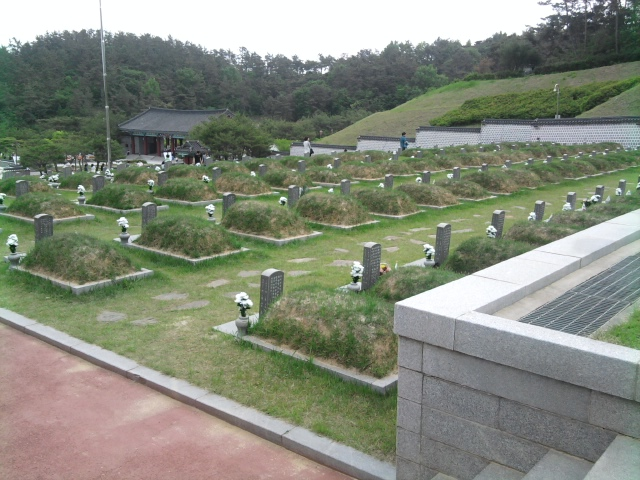
The 3rd boundaries of a grave

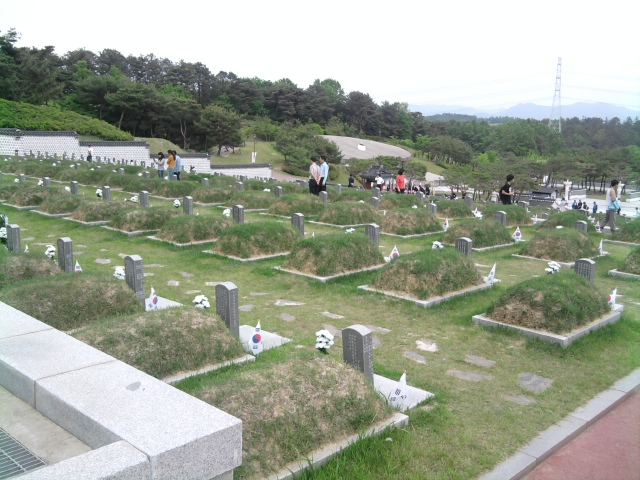
The 4th boundaries of a grave

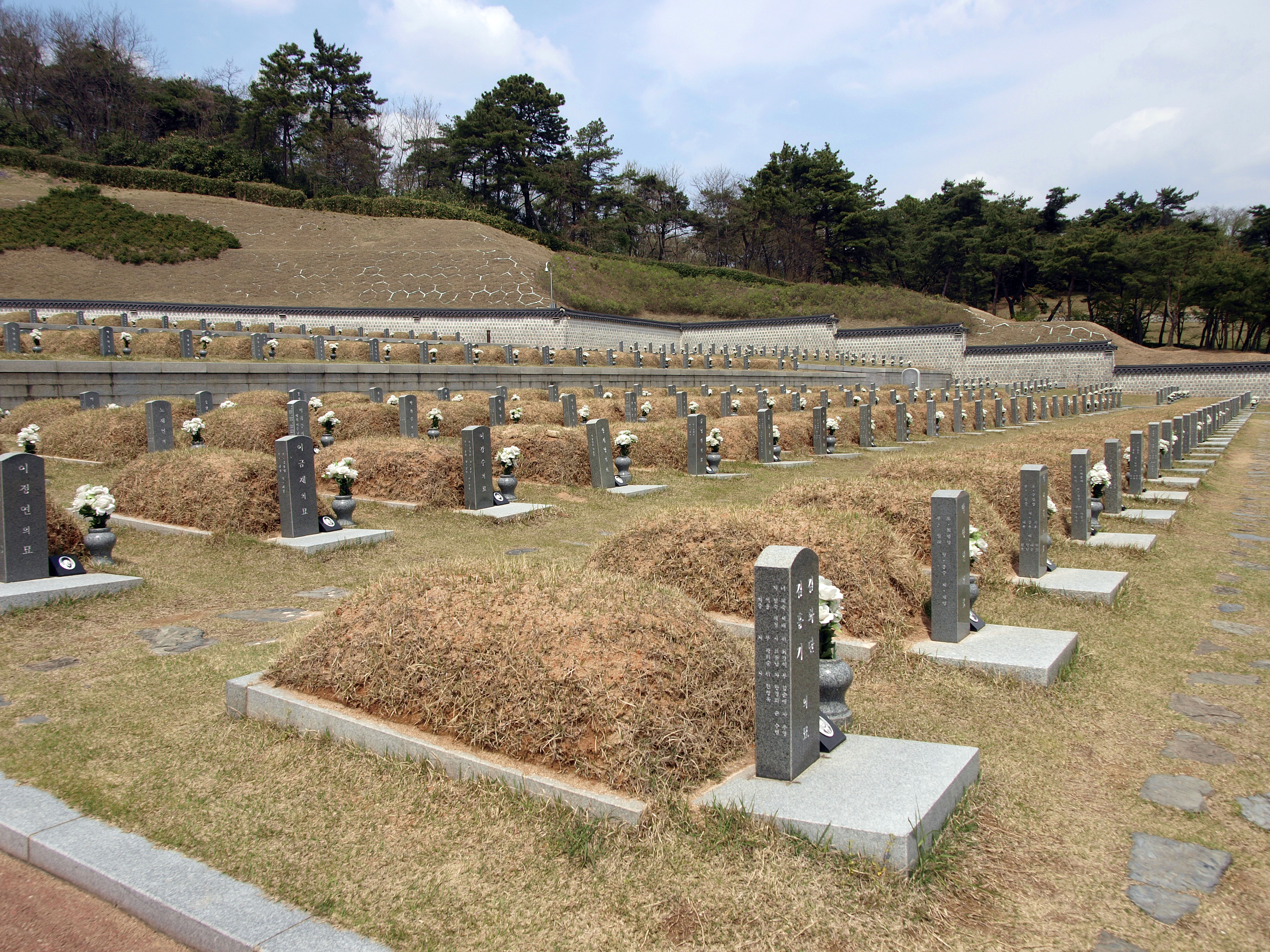
Graves in May 18th National Cemetery

- Burial capacity: 784
- Number of burial sites: 482

=== Notable burials ===
Old Cemetery (구묘역; 舊墓域)

- Lee Cheol-gyu; Born in Jangseong County, educated at Chosun University. He died during the Gwangju Uprising, although the exact circumstances of his death are not known.
- Lee Han-yeol; Born in Hwasun County, Jeonlanamdo in 1966. Democratic movement activist. Fatally wounded during June 10th Democracy Movement demonstration in front of Yonsei University, his death sparked further protests.
- Kang Gyeong-dae; Student activist who died in 1991 during the demonstration against military dictatorship.
- Park Gwan-hyeon; Student leader and activist from the Chonnam University.

New cemetery (신묘역; 新墓域)

- Yoon Sang-won and Park Gi-sun; Militia spokespeople during the Gwangju Uprising.

== Monuments and memorials ==
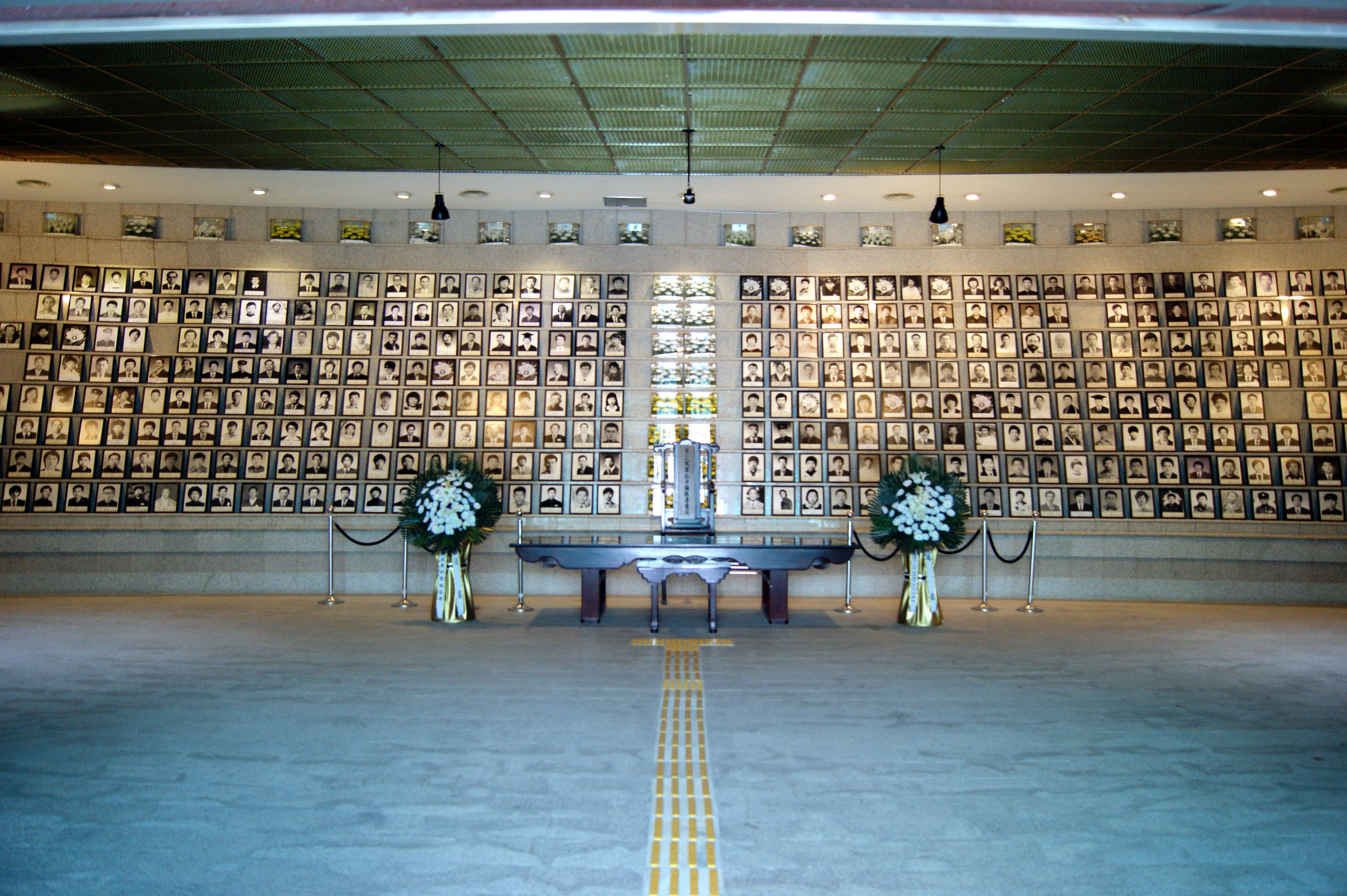
Memorial Hall

=== May 18th Memorial Monument ===
The Memorial Monument consists of two parallel pillars 40 metres (130 ft) tall, based on a traditional Korean "flagpole" design (dang-gan-ji-ju). This monument represents the concepts of new life, survival, and seeds of hope. Near the center point of the pillars is an ovular sculpture, representing "resurrection". To the right and left of the monument are two bronze sculptures called "Grassroots Resistance of May".

=== Memorial Hall ===
The Memorial Hall allows visitors to view and interactively experience the events of the May 18th Democratic Uprising. The exhibition includes a historical record of the Uprising, tributes to victims, a virtual tour of important landmarks in the democratic movement, and facilities for educational presentations.

=== Portrait Enshrinement Tower ===
This building is designed in the form of a dolmen, a traditional tomb dating to the prehistoric period. Portraits of those who are buried in the May 18th National Cemetery are enshrined on the walls of this building.

=== Seungmoru ===
A two-story exhibition space with facilities for viewing video footage of the Gwangju Uprising.

=== Hill of Democracy ===
A memorial hill planted with "Trees of Democracy" representing "the will of all Korean people to commemorate the noble sacrifice" of Uprising participants.

=== Gates ===
Several memorial gates stand on the grounds. At the entrance is the Gate of Democracy, which contains a visitor guestbook. The Gate Cherishing the Memory of the Deceased stands approximately three stories high. The Gateway to History contains historic photographs and video documentaries.

=== Art ===
Numerous statues honor Uprising victims and express hope for peace and justice, including the Bronze Statue of Armed Resistance and the Statue of a Peaceful and Prosperous World. A series of relief sculptures titled "Seven Scenes From History" depicts the history of resistance to oppression in Korea.

== See also ==
- History of Korea
- April Revolution
- June Democratic Uprising
