= Busan–Masan Uprising =

1979 South Korean protests

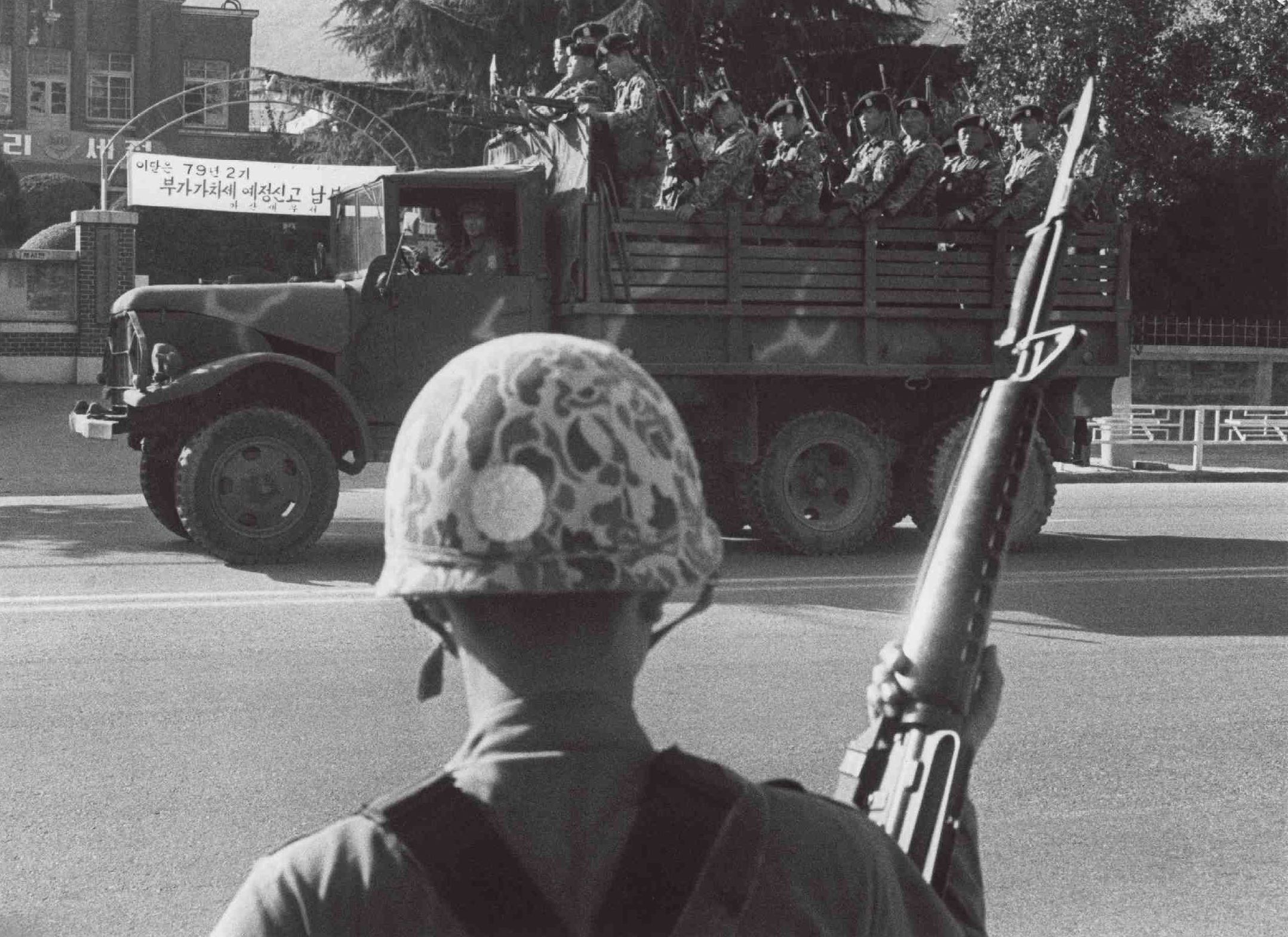
- Paratroopers entering Masan, 20 October
- Date: 16–20 October 1979
- Location: Busan, Masan, South Korea
- Caused by: Discontent over Park Chung Hee's Yushin regime
- Goals: Democratization
- Methods: Demonstrations and civil disobedience
- Result: Protest suppressed

Parties
Government of South Korea: Republic of Korea Army; ROKA Special Warfare Command; Republic of Korea Marine Corps; ROKMC 1st Marine Division; National Security Headquarters	Busan and Masan citizenry: Protesters

Number
	8,000 protesters

Casualties and losses
	1,058 arrested

The Busan–Masan Uprising or abbreviated, the Bu-Ma Uprising, was a series of demonstrations and popular uprising against President Park Chung Hee's dictatorial Yushin regime in South Korea. It took place between 16 and 20 October 1979 in Busan and Masan (now a district of Changwon, South Korea). Students from Pusan National University began demonstrations calling for an end to Park's dictatorship, following the regime's controversial decision to expel New Democratic Party chairman Kim Young-sam from the national assembly.

On 17 October the protests grew to include citizens and spread to Masan on 18 and 19 October. It is also called the Busan–Masan Democratic Uprising (Korean: 부마민주항쟁; Hanja: 釜馬民主抗爭) or Busan–Masan Democratization Movement (부마민주화운동; 釜馬民主化運動).

Park declared martial law on 18 October and referred 66 people to military court. On 20 October, Park invoked the Garrison Act. The army was mobilized, and 59 civilians were summoned to military court. Six days later, Park was assassinated by his own intelligence chief Kim Jae-gyu, leading to the Seoul Spring and seizure of power by general Chun Doo-hwan the following year.

== Background ==
The 1978 National Assembly election was held in December and was influenced by the government. Nevertheless, the ruling Democratic Republican Party was defeated by the New Democratic Party.

In August 1979, female workers of the YH Trading Company (YH무역주식회사) performed a sit-in at the headquarters of the New Democratic Party. Leader of the New Democratic Party Kim Young-sam conducted an interview with the New York Times stating that the U.S. government stop financial aid towards Park's Administration and thus end support for a 'minority dictatorial regime'. In response to this interview, the ruling Democratic Republican Party expelled Kim Young-sam from the National Assembly, leading to the resignation of all opposition party members from the National Assembly.

== Progress ==
The protest's history is as follows:

- 3 May 1979 - A national convention of New Democratic Party occurred, the moderate party representative Yi Cheol-seung defected, Kim Young-sam was elected.
- 11 August 1979 - A sit in held by YH Trading Company workers at the New Democratic Party Headquarters violently suppressed by riot police resulted in the death of one female worker. Kim Young-sam arrested.
- 4 October 1979 - The ruling Democratic Republican Party expelled Kim Young-sam from the National Assembly.
- 15 October 1979 - 'Declaration of Democratic Struggle' released students of Pusan National University.
- 16 October 1979 - Busan–Masan Uprising occurred.
- 17 October 1979 - Chungmu police substation, the Korean Broadcasting System, and the Busan tax office were destroyed. Police vehicles were burned and damaged.
- 18 October 1979 - The government declared martial law in Busan at 12:00 am. The military arrested 1,058 people, 87 of whom went on to face trial. Airborne troops deployed in Busan and in Masan.
- 20 October 1979 - Governments invoke the Garrison Act at Masan.
- 26 October 1979 - President Park Chung Hee was assassinated.
- 28 November 1979 - The martial court sentenced 20 participants to 2 to 5 years on charges of riot, arson, and violation of martial law proclamation. The charges for the 67 other people were withdrawn and subsequently released.

== Influence ==
This incident incited conflict inside the government, which led in turn to the Yushin regime's premature demise that had been sustained by an emergency measure. After President Park Chung Hee's assassination, martial law was declared and expanded nationwide by Chun Doo-hwan, then Security Commander, after which he became Martial Law Commander. As Martial Law Commander, Chun inaugurated himself as President and dissolved the National Assembly. After these events, then acting President Choi Kyu-hah resigned. The Chun Doo-hwan administration was also known as the Fifth Republic of Korea.

The protest influenced other democratization movements including Seoul Spring, Gwangju Uprising and the June Democracy Movement.

== Aftermath ==
Democracy Park was built in 1999, and a monument was erected to honor the participants of the protests.

In 2013 the Bill on the Restoration of Honor and Compensation for Persons Involved in the Buma Democratic Uprising was passed to promote the impact that this protest had on Korea's democratization. Additionally, this bill stated there will be efforts to compensate victims of the protests. Some of the provisions of this bill include, right to Petition for Retrial, 'Determination of Disability Grades for Injured Persons Among Those Involved', monetary compensation towards bereaved families and other relevant parties, restoration of honor of persons involved.

In September 2020, one student of Pusan National University at the time of the protests filed a claim for damages against the Republic of Korea government after being arrested and held in a holding cell for 10 days. On 7 October 2022, Presiding Judge Lee Jeong-kwon of the Seoul Central District Court ruled that the Republic of Korea government pay 25 Million Won in damages to the plaintiff.

== See also ==
- People's Revolutionary Party Incident
- Gwangju Uprising
- June Democratic Uprising
- Kim Young-sam
- October Yushin
