= Jürgen Hinzpeter =

German journalist (1937–2016)

- Born: 6 July 1937; Lübeck, Germany
- Died: 25 January 2016 (aged 78); Ratzeburg, Germany
- Occupation: Journalist
- Years active: 1963–1995
- Known for: Reporting on the Gwangju uprising in South Korea
- Spouse: Edeltraut Brahmstaedt
- Awards: the Song Kun-Ho Journalism Prize and the Cameraman of the Month award

Jürgen Hinzpeter (6 July 1937 – 25 January 2016) was a German journalist best known for his coverage of South Korean topics. Hinzpeter was a reporter for the ARD and the only journalist to film the massacres during the Gwangju Uprising in South Korea in 1980. He captured the events on camera, documenting the violence against civilians and the military crackdown in the city. His footage was sent to West Germany and broadcast internationally, exposing the South Korean regime under Chun Doo-hwan to global scrutiny.

His coverage helped draw pressure from the international community, contributing to the eventual push for democratization in South Korea, which culminated in 1987. Hinzpeter also reported on opposition politician Kim Dae-jung, who later became president of South Korea after winning the 1997 election. In Gwangju, a memorial honouring Hinzpeter has been erected by the May 18 Memorial Foundation.

== Career ==
Hinzpeter was eager to become a doctor during his school days, but joined the Hamburg branch of ARD, Germany's regional public-service broadcaster, as the TV station cameraman in 1963, changing his career path to journalism. In early 1967, he was assigned to Hong Kong, where the ARD had its only branch in East Asia. Covering the Vietnam War, he was injured in Saigon in the spring of 1967. After that, he transferred to the Tokyo branch of the ARD and worked as a correspondent there for nearly 17 years from 1973 to 1989.

Hinzpeter visited South Korea several times as the ARD's Japanese correspondent. He recorded a large number of public security incidents under the Park Chung Hee regime and did interviews with Kim Young-sam, who was under house arrest just before the 18 May Democratic Uprising.

On 19 May 1980, when the Democratic Uprising was in progress, Paul Schneiss, Pastor of the East Asia Germany Mission, arranged for Hinzpeter to go to Gwangju from Japan. In the early morning hours of 20 May he covertly entered Gwangju. Hinzpeter filmed the Gwangju massacre, where young people were beaten and trampled, and the bodies of other young people were seen in the provincial government building, on ten rolls of film. Smuggling out his film, Hinzpeter hid the five most important rolls of film on his person, and the other five in a metal biscuit tin decorated to look like a wedding gift. He flew to Tokyo and sent the film to Germany. Hinzpeter returned to Gwangju on 23 May to photograph the liberation of Gwangju, when martial law was withdrawn and the citizens' local self-government was formed. He was emotionally shaken by the brutal events he witnessed.

Hinzpeter's film was immediately shared with many countries through the ARD, and it was incorporated in and broadcast as a documentary titled Korea standing at a crossroads in September of that year. The documentary was secretly screened in the Fifth Republic of Korea, where the media was being tightly controlled at the time. Most of the video materials related to the Gwangju Democratization Movement known today were collected by Hinzpeter. Covering protests at Gwanghwamun intersection in November 1986, the end of the republic, Hinzpeter was beaten by plainclothes officers and received a neck spine injury. After retiring from journalism in 1995, he settled in Ratzeburg, Germany.

The video taken by Hinzpeter at Gwangju was released in an episode of KBS 1TV's Sunday Special in 2003 entitled "May 1980 - Blue Eyed Witnesses" (Korean: 80년 5월 - 푸른 눈의 목격자). The 2017 film A Taxi Driver centers on Kim Man-seob, a dramatization of the taxi driver who helped Hinzpeter during the uprising.

== Awards and honors ==
In 2003, Hinzpeter was awarded the "Song Gun-ho Press Award" by the South Korean journalist association in recognition of his contribution to the South Korean democratization movement. On 19 May 2005, he was awarded a special prize by the Korea Broadcast Camera Journalists Association.

== Later life and death ==
With his chronic heart disease temporarily putting him in a life-threatening condition in 2004, Hinzpeter revealed his desire to be buried in Gwangju after his death. Dramatically recovering his health, he attended the twenty-fifth ceremony for the Democratic Uprising and continued his activities, including writing his memoirs.

Hinzpeter died on 25 January 2016, at the age of 78 at the University of Lübeck in Germany. Another source said that he died in his hometown of Ratzeburg, northern Germany. Though he had expressed the desire to be buried in Gwangju, his family did not honor that wish. Instead, a cenotaph containing his nail clippings and hair, which Hinzpeter had left in the city in 2005, was installed in a special memorial garden in Gwangju by the May 18 Memorial Foundation on 16 May 2016.
