= Censorship in Korea =

Censorship in Korea may refer to:

- Censorship in South Korea
- Censorship in North Korea
