= Kim Byung-joo =

- Hangul: 김병주
- RR: Gim Byeongju
- MR: Kim Pyŏngju

Kim Byung-joo (Korean: 김병주) may refer to:

- Kim Byung-joo (general), born 1962
- Michael Kim (businessman), born 1963, Korean name ByungJu Kim
- Kim Byung-joo (judoka), born 1968
