= Choi Byung-hyuk =

South Korean general (born 1963)

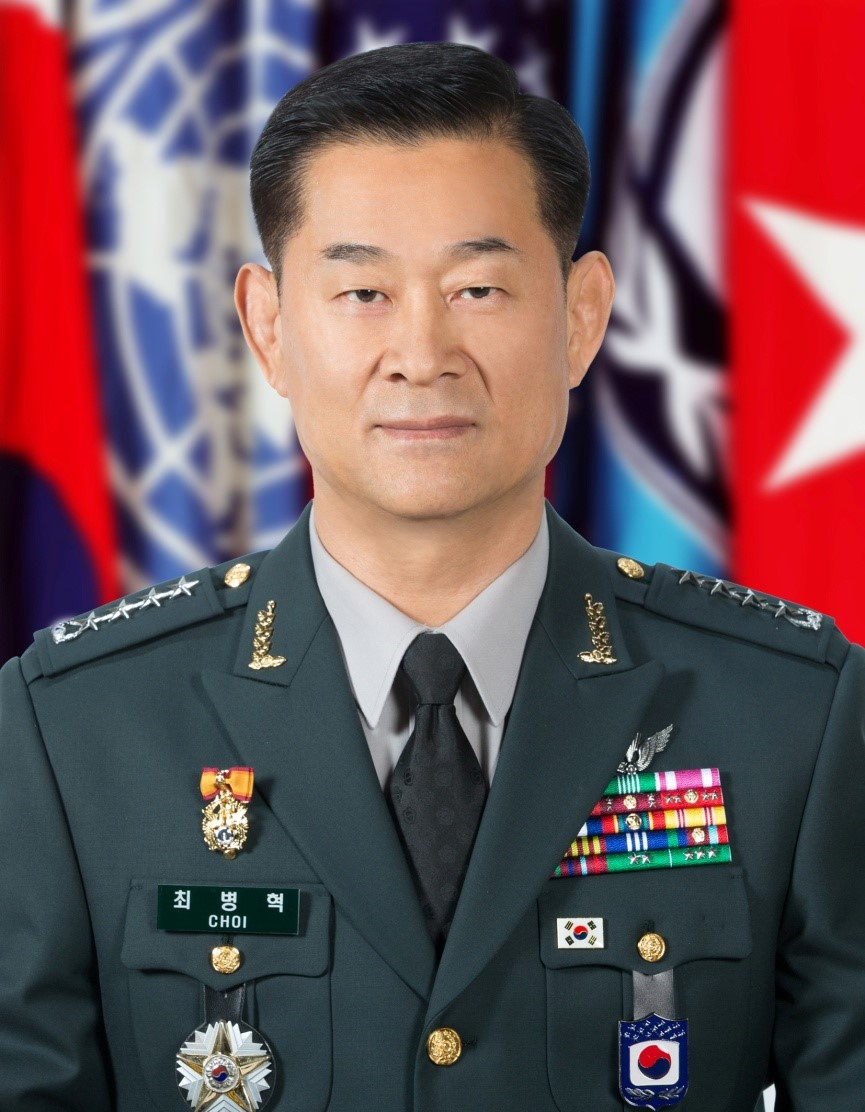
- Official portrait, 2019

South Korean Ambassador to Saudi Arabia
- Incumbent
- Assumed office December 2023
- President: Yoon Suk Yeol

Deputy Commander of ROK/US Combined Forces Command
- In office 17 April 2019 – 23 September 2020
- President: Moon Jae-in
- Preceded by: Kim Byung-joo
- Succeeded by: Kim Seung-kyum

Personal details
- Born: 1 January 1963 (age 63) Hwaseong, South Korea
- Spouse: Lee Hye-young
- Children: 3
- Education: Korean Military Academy (BA); U.S. Army War College (MA)
- Awards: Order of National Security Merit

Military service
- Allegiance: South Korea
- Branch/service: Republic of Korea Army
- Years of service: 1985–2020
- Rank: General
- Commands: Commander of ROK 22nd Division; Deputy Commander of ROK-US Combined Forces Command; V Corps

Korean name
- Hangul: 최병혁
- Hanja: 崔秉赫
- RR: Choe Byeonghyeok
- MR: Ch'oe Pyŏnghyŏk

Choi Byung-hyuk (Korean: 최병혁; born 1 January 1963) is a retired Republic of Korea Army lieutenant general. President Yoon Suk Yeol announced his intention to nominate Choi to serve as Minister of National Defense after the resignation of Choi's predecessor Kim Yong-hyun and Kim's imposition of martial law in December 2024, but rejected the appointment.

== Career ==
Choi holds a bachelor's degree from the Korea Military Academy, where he graduated in 1985. Choi also holds a master's degree of Strategy from U.S. Army War College, and a PhD course in International Politics from Kyungnam University.

Choi held many command positions in the ROK Division, including as company, battalion, and regiment commanders. He also served as Commander of the ROK 22nd Division from 2014 to 2016 and Commander of the 5th Corps from 2017 to 2018. In addition to his command assignments, Choi served in many critical staff positions including Chief of Operations at Third ROK Army, Inspector General at ROK Army HQ, and Vice Chief of Staff at ROK Army HQ. Following his promotion to four-star general, he became the Deputy Commander of the ROK-US Combined Forces Command.

Choi retired in September 2020. Choi is also currently the President of the Korea Defense Veterans Association Korea Chapter.

Choi served as the Korean ambassador to Saudi Arabia, being appointed by Yook Suk Yeol in December 2023. Choi was then nominated by Yoon to become defense minister, succeeding Kim Yong-hyun. However, Choi rejected the appointment and thus the post remained vacant.

== Awards and decorations ==
Order of National Security Merit, Tong-il Medal (Republic of Korea)

Order of National Security Merit, Gukseon Medal (Republic of Korea)

Meritorious Service Medal (United States)

- Presidential Citation Commendation Medal
- Secretary of Defense Commendation Medal
