= Yoon Suk Yeol =

President of South Korea from 2022 to 2025

Yoon Suk Yeol GOM KWE OMRI GCB GCNL OSP
- 윤석열
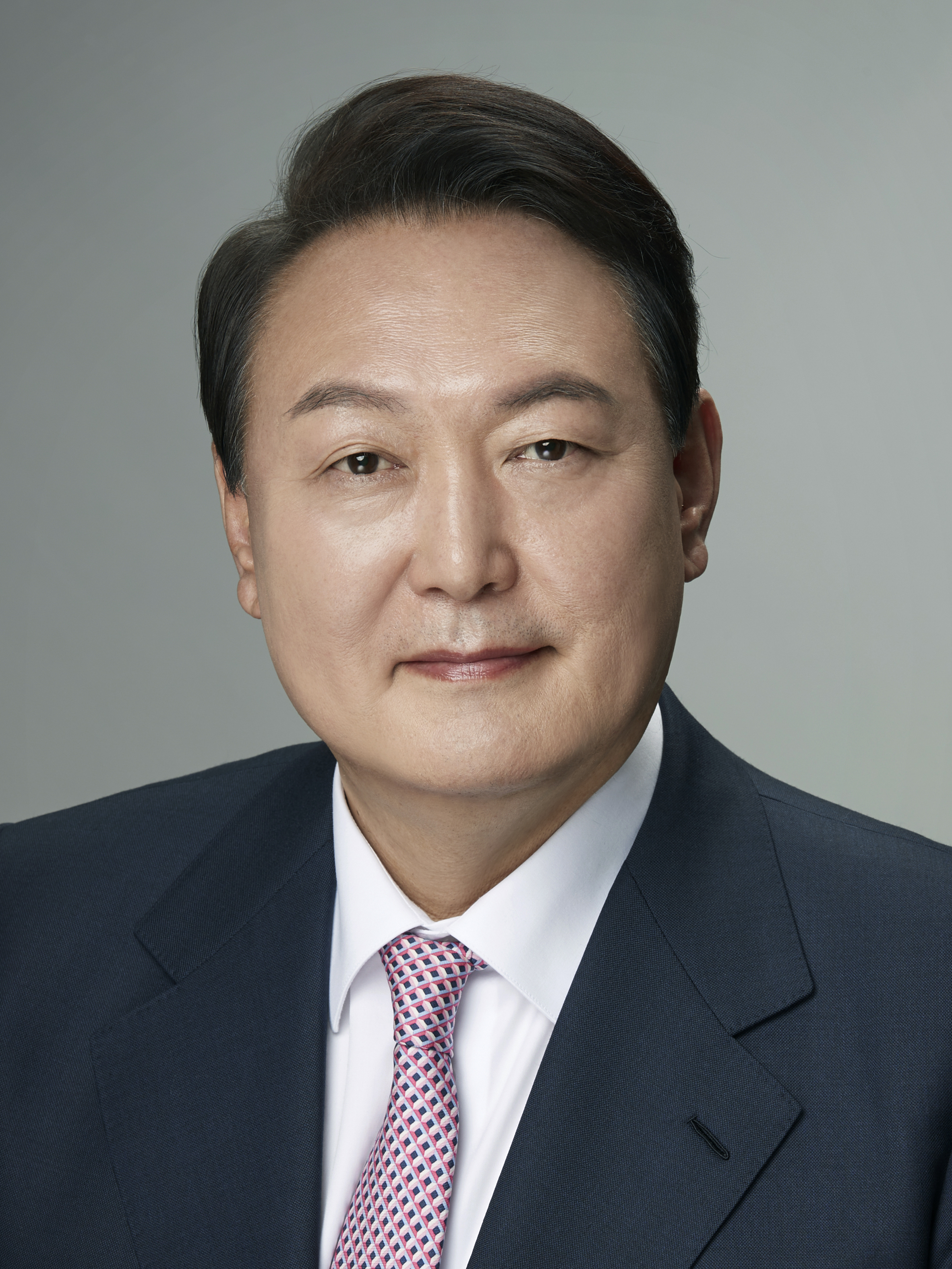
- Official portrait, 2022

13th President of South Korea
- In office 10 May 2022 – 4 April 2025 (Note: Yoon's powers and duties were suspended from 14 December 2024 onwards. His presidency was officially ended after the Constitutional Court of Korea upheld his impeachment.)
- Prime Minister: Kim Boo-kyum; Choo Kyung-ho (acting); Han Duck-soo; Choi Sang-mok (acting); Han Duck-soo
- Preceded by: Moon Jae-in
- Succeeded by: Han Duck-soo (acting); Lee Ju-ho (acting); Lee Jae Myung

Prosecutor General of South Korea
- In office 25 July 2019 – 4 March 2021
- President: Moon Jae-in
- Prime Minister: Lee Nak-yon; Chung Sye-kyun
- Preceded by: Mun Mu-il
- Succeeded by: Kim Oh-soo

Personal details
- Born: 18 December 1960 (age 65) Seongbuk, Seoul, South Korea
- Party: Independent (before 2021; since 2025)
- Other political affiliations: People Power (2021–2025); Chungam Faction (since 2022)
- Spouse: Kim Keon Hee (m. 2012)
- Parent: Yoon Ki Joong (father)
- Education: Seoul National University (LLB, LLM)
- Occupation: Politician; lawyer
- Nickname: Gyong (굥)
- Criminal information
- Movement: 2024 martial law
- Status: Imprisoned
- Convictions: 7 counts (Note: Obstruction of official duties to resist arrest; Forgery and destruction of official documents; Destruction of evidence; Abuse of power (violation of procedural due process in declaring martial law); Leading an insurrection; Treason; Abuse of power (using military personnel for political purposes))
- Penalty: Violation of procedural due process in declaring martial law and obstructing arrest and martial law related investigations: 7 years imprisonment; Leading an insurrection: Life imprisonment; North Korea drone infiltration case: 30 years imprisonment for treason and abuse of power

Details
- Date apprehended: 15 January 2025
- Imprisoned at: Seoul Detention Center

Korean name
- Hangul: 윤석열
- Hanja: 尹錫悅
- RR: Yun Seokyeol
- MR: Yun Sŏgyŏl
- IPA: [jun sʰʌŋnjʌɭ] (Note: If Yoon's given name 석열 (Suk Yeol) followed regular Korean pronunciation rules, it would be pronounced [sʰʌɡjʌɭ] (서결; Seogyeol). However, he pronounces it [sʰʌŋnjʌɭ] (성녈; Seongnyeol).)
- Yoon Suk Yeol's voice Yoon Suk Yeol speaks on South Korea's relations with the United States. Recorded 27 April 2023

Yoon Suk Yeol (Korean: 윤석열; pronounced [jun sʰʌŋnjʌɭ]; born 18 December 1960) is a South Korean politician who served as the 13th President of South Korea from 2022 until his removal from office in 2025. A member of the People Power Party during his presidency, he had the shortest presidency as an elected leader in the country's democratic history. Yoon previously served as prosecutor general from 2019 to 2021. Yoon is currently serving a life sentence in prison after being convicted of heading an insurrection and other crimes.

Born in Seoul, Yoon received his bachelor's and master's degrees in law from Seoul National University. In his capacity as chief of the Seoul Central District Prosecutor's Office, he played a key role in convicting former presidents Park Geun-hye and Lee Myung-bak for corruption and abuse of power. In 2019, President Moon Jae-in appointed Yoon as Prosecutor General of South Korea. Under Yoon's leadership, the Supreme Prosecutor's Office conducted embattled investigations into Cho Kuk, an influential figure in the Moon administration, that led to Cho's resignation as Minister of Justice. Yoon's clashes with the Moon administration prior to his resignation as prosecutor general in 2021 led to his rise as a potential presidential candidate among conservative voters.

On 29 June 2021, Yoon announced his candidacy in the 2022 presidential election. He joined the People Power Party (PPP) in July and won its nomination in November. Considered a conservative politician, Yoon ran on a platform promising economic deregulation, opposing feminism, and on measures such as abolishing the Ministry of Gender Equality and Family. He narrowly defeated Democratic Party nominee Lee Jae Myung by less than a percentage point on 9 March 2022 and assumed office as president on 10 May, becoming the first elected president to be born after the end to fighting in the Korean War. During his presidency, Yoon pursued friendlier relations with Japan and the United States, and has been described as hawkish toward North Korea. His handling of the Seoul Halloween crowd crush in 2022 and the medical crisis has attracted criticism. In the 2024 parliamentary midterm elections, Yoon's party suffered a defeat, which weakened his political power. Under Yoon's tenure, South Korea underwent democratic backsliding and a shift towards authoritarianism. He received mostly low approval ratings as president and had been described as a lame duck.

On 3 December 2024, Yoon attempted a self-coup by declaring martial law, the first time it had been declared in South Korea since the military dictatorship of Chun Doo-hwan in 1980. He accused members of the National Assembly of supporting North Korea, but lifted martial law after the Assembly passed an emergency motion nullifying the declaration a few hours later. Amid widespread criticism and mass protests, an impeachment motion was introduced against Yoon the next day, though it fell short of the 200 votes needed to pass. Yoon was successfully impeached and suspended from his presidential powers in a second vote ten days later. Yoon subsequently became the first sitting president in South Korean history to face an arrest warrant and, in January 2025, the first to be arrested and incarcerated. On 4 April, the Constitutional Court unanimously upheld Yoon's impeachment by the National Assembly, officially terminating his presidency. Yoon announced his departure from the PPP in May. In February 2026, he was sentenced to life imprisonment without parole over the martial law declaration. Yoon is serving his sentence at Seoul Detention Center and faces ongoing multiple criminal trials in relation to other charges from the martial law declaration and other scandals.

== Early life and education ==
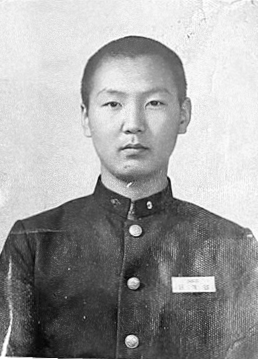
Yoon in 1976 at age 16

Yoon was born in Bomun-dong, Seongbuk District, Seoul, in 1960, and raised in Yeonhui-dong, Seodaemun District. His father, Yoon Ki Joong, was born in Nonsan, and was a professor emeritus of economics at Yonsei University and a full member of the National Academy of Sciences of the Republic of Korea. His mother, Choi Seong-ja, was born in Gangneung, and was a lecturer at Ewha Womans University before leaving the position after getting married.

Yoon attended Daegwang Elementary School and Joongrang Middle School, transferring to Chungam Middle School after finishing eighth grade. After graduating from Chungam High School in 1979, he studied law at Seoul National University where he earned a Bachelor of Laws in 1983 and a Master of Laws in 1988. Shortly after the Gwangju Uprising in 1980, Yoon and his colleagues held a mock trial where he acted as a prosecutor, demanding life imprisonment for President Chun Doo-hwan. Fearing imprisonment for his role in the mock trial, Yoon fled to Gangwon Province.

Yoon was exempted in 1982 from national service due to anisometropia. Yoon later stated that he was unable to obtain a driver's license because of the condition. After passing the first part of the bar exam in his fourth year of university, Yoon continued to attempt the second part over the next nine years. He eventually passed the bar in 1991, placing him in the same graduating class as Democratic Party Assemblyman and Minister of Justice Park Beom-kye.

=== History with Kim Yong-hyun ===
In 1977, while attending Chungam High School, Yoon met Kim Yong-hyun, the future Minister of National Defense, who was one year his senior and was the head of the Student Defense Corps. The student defense corps was an organization created by the South Korean government in 1975 to replace the student council, to "establish an all-out security system for the school system." Kim explained his relationship with Yoon in an interview, saying, "I heard there was a junior who was good at studying and had a sense of duty, so I called him out of curiosity and asked to meet him." After Kim entered the Korea Military Academy, he lost contact with Yoon. Years later, through an alumni association, they found each other again and stayed in contact.

However, the two did not become close friends until 2020, after Yoon was suspended from his prosecutor general duties by Minister of Justice Choo Mi-ae. Yoon, who was living a life of exile due to the suspension, called Kim over to have a drink. Here, Kim and Yoon had a conversation about prominent political South Korean figures, which reportedly got Yoon interested in running for president. After Yoon announced his campaign, Kim told him; "If you want to win the election, you need to build a campaign centered around Chungam High School alumni and Seoul National University alumni, people who aren't from the prosecution." This allegedly led to the two forming the Chungam Faction after Yoon became president.

== Prosecutorial career ==
=== Early career ===
Yoon started his career at Daegu Public Prosecutor's Office in 1994. He headed the Special Branch and Central Investigation Department, both of which investigate corruption-related cases. In 1999, he ordered the arrest of Police Assistant Commissioner Park Hui-won, who was corrupt despite strong objections from bureaucrats in the Kim Dae-jung cabinet.

In January 2002, Yoon worked briefly as a lawyer at Bae, Kim & Lee but left because he felt the position was unsuitable. Upon his return as a prosecutor, he prosecuted pro-Roh Moo-hyun figures such as Ahn Hee-jung and Kang Keum-won. In 2006, he apprehended Chung Mong-koo for his complicity in a slush fund case at Hyundai Motor Company. In 2008, he worked for the independent counsel team resolving the BBK incident related to President Lee Myung-bak.

In 2013, Yoon led a special investigation team that looked into the National Intelligence Service (NIS)'s involvement in the 2012 NIS public opinion manipulation scandal. Yoon sought the prosecution of the former head of the NIS, Won Sei-hoon, for violating the Public Official Election Act. He also accused Justice Minister Hwang Kyo-ahn of influencing his investigation. As a result, he was demoted from the Seoul prosecutors' office to the Daegu and Daejeon High Prosecutors' Office.

Yoon later became head of investigations in the special prosecutor team of Park Young-soo, which investigated allegations of the 2016 Choi Soon-sil scandal involving Choi, Samsung vice-chairman Lee Jae-yong, and then-president Park Geun-hye, which led to the impeachment of the president in December 2016.

On 19 May 2017, the newly elected president Moon Jae-in appointed Yoon as chief of the Seoul Central District Prosecutors' Office. The prosecution went on to indict two former presidents Lee Myung-bak and Park Geun-hye, three former NIS chiefs, former chief justice Yang Sung-tae, and more than 100 other former officials and business executives under his tenure. Yoon also led an investigation into accounting fraud at Samsung.

=== Prosecutor general ===
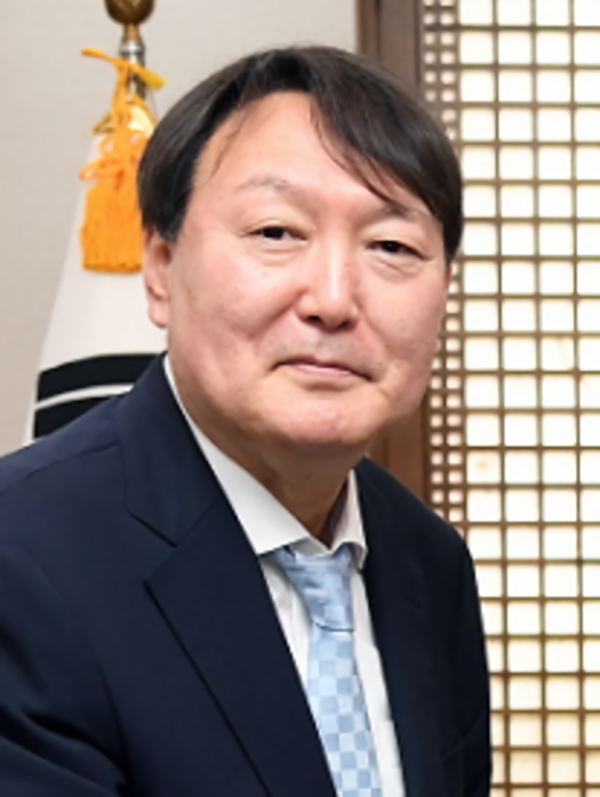
Yoon as Prosecutor General, in 2019

On 17 June 2019, Yoon was nominated as prosecutor general, replacing Moon Moo-il. His nomination was welcomed by the ruling Democratic Party and the Party for Democracy and Peace but was opposed by the Liberty Korea Party and the Bareunmirae Party. The minor party Justice Party remained neutral. On 16 July, he was officially appointed the new prosecutor general and started his term nine days later. President Moon ordered him to be neutral, adding that any kind of corruption must be strictly investigated in any and all areas of government.

During Yoon's leadership, the Supreme Prosecutor's Office launched investigations against Minister of Justice Cho Kuk, who was involved in various scandals. His decision to investigate Cho was welcomed by the conservative opposition but condemned by the Democratic Party and its supporters. The investigations led to Cho's resignation as Minister of Justice.

After Choo Mi-ae was appointed as the new minister of justice, she had taken action against several prosecutors close to Yoon. Choo attributed her decision to Yoon's failure to submit a reorganization plan for his department, which she had requested, but this was seen as retaliation by the Blue House for Cho Kuk's prosecution.

In April 2020, Democratic Party lawmakers again attacked Yoon and called on him to resign after the prosecution had started investigations into election law violation cases involving both ruling and opposition politicians and suspected election rigging of the Ulsan mayoral race for Mayor Song Cheol-ho in 2018 by senior secretaries at the Blue House.

Opposition politicians also accused Yoon of refusing to raid the Shincheonji Church of Jesus, which had been accused of spreading COVID-19 in South Korea, after he had received advice from a shaman.

==== Suspension and reinstatement ====
On 24 November 2020, Minister of Justice Choo Mi-ae suspended Yoon from his position, citing alleged ethical violations, abuse of power, and interference in investigations of his associates and family members. Yoon then filed an injunction against the minister's suspension order, which was approved by the Seoul Administrative Court on 1 December, temporarily halting the suspension. On 16 December, the Ministry of Justice imposed a two-month suspension on Yoon, accepting four of six major charges for disciplinary action. The decision was subsequently approved by President Moon. However, on 24 December, following an injunction filed at the Seoul Administrative Court, the suspension was overturned as the court accepted Yoon's claim that the process to suspend him had been unfair.

== 2022 presidential election ==
Yoon had been considered a potential presidential candidate for the 2022 presidential election ever since the aftermath of the Cho Kuk controversies, appearing as a significant candidate in general election opinion polls since at least January 2020. In a January 2021 poll including all possible presidential candidates, Yoon led as the most favored with 30.4 percent of the vote, more than the individual supports for the ruling Democratic Party frontrunners Lee Jae Myung and Lee Nak-yon.

On 4 March 2021, Yoon tendered his resignation as the prosecutor general, which was accepted by President Moon. On 29 June 2021, Yoon officially announced his candidacy in the 2022 presidential election. On 12 July, he registered with the National Election Commission as an Independent candidate.

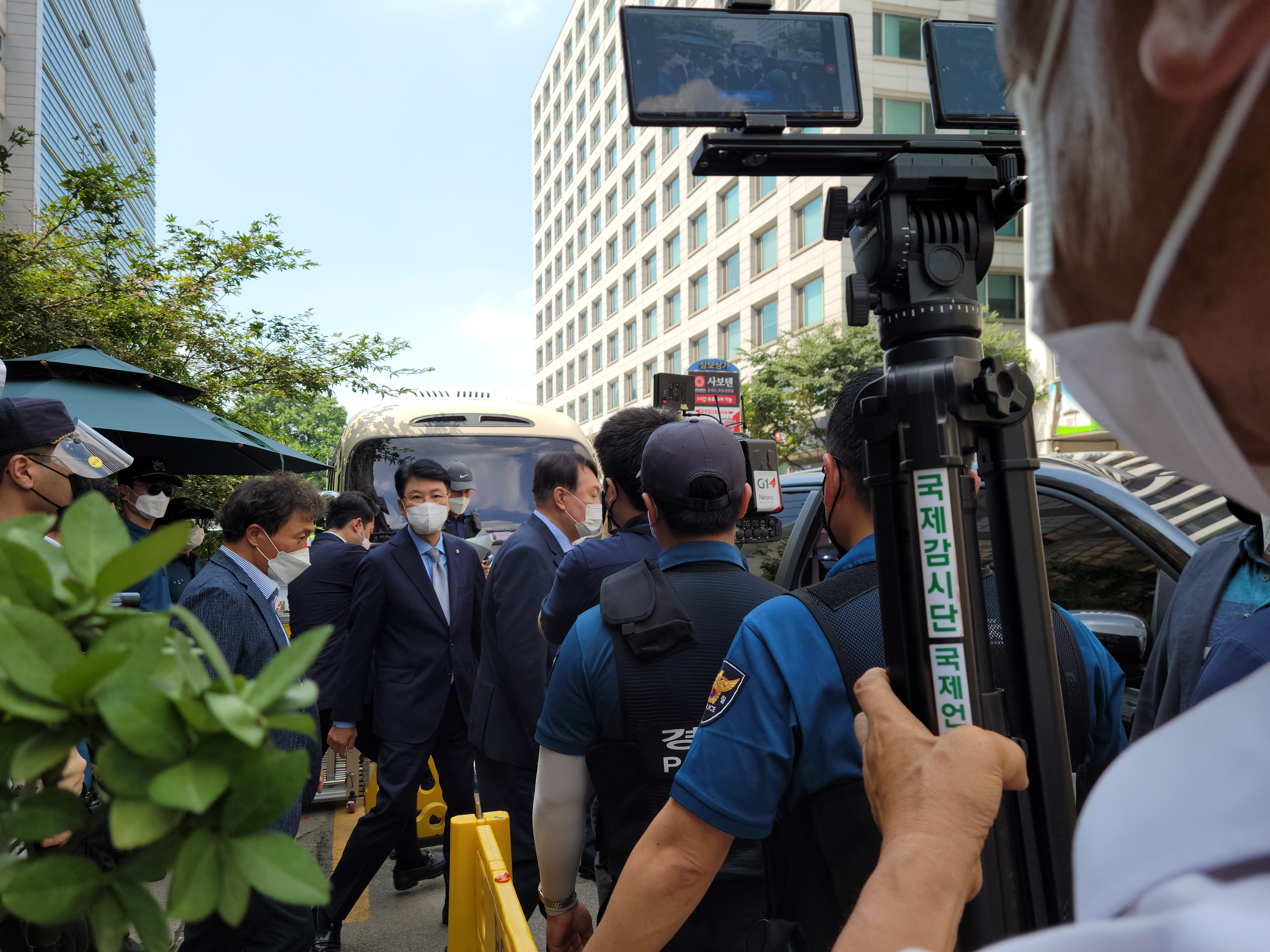
Yoon Suk Yeol leaving the People Power Party (PPP) headquarters shortly after joining the party on 30 July 2021

On 30 July 2021, Yoon officially joined the conservative People Power Party (PPP), which was the main opposition party in South Korea. Prior to this, Yoon had been a political independent, although his popular support came primarily from conservatives. Yoon was welcomed into the PPP by Choi Jae-hyung, a fellow 2022 presidential candidate, in a small public ceremony at the PPP headquarters located in Yeouido, Seoul. Choi was the former head of the Board of Audit and Inspection and had also just recently joined the PPP, officially having become a member on 15 July. Yoon's welcoming ceremony into the People Power Party notably did not include recently elected party leader Lee Jun-seok, who had been outside of Seoul at the time.

During the primary election period, Yoon came under criticism for several perceived gaffes and controversial statements. In July, Yoon advocated for a 120-hour work week while critiquing President Moon's policy of the 52-hour maximum work week. Yoon also advocated for deregulating food safety standards because, in his opinion, "poor people should be allowed to eat substandard food for lower prices", citing economist Milton Friedman's 1980 book Free to Choose as the inspiration for the idea. In August, Yoon stated that South Korea's recent feminist movement was a significant contributing factor to the issue of the nation's low birth rates. Later that same week, Yoon claimed during an interview with Busan Ilbo that there was "basically no radiation leak" from the Fukushima Daiichi nuclear disaster because "the reactors themselves didn't collapse".

On 2 September 2021, news website Newsverse reported that during his time as prosecutor general, Yoon had allegedly ordered a senior prosecutor Son Jun-sung and politician Kim Woong to file politically motivated criminal complaints against Democratic Party politicians ahead of the 2020 legislative elections in an attempt to sway the elections. In response to the allegations, an internal investigatory probe was launched by the Supreme Prosecutor's Office, and an investigation was launched by the recently formed Corruption Investigation Office for High-ranking Officials (CIO). Yoon denied the allegations and reported informant Cho Sung-eun and Director of the National Intelligence Service Park Jie-won to the CIO.

In early September, support for PPP primary contender Hong Joon-pyo, who had been the nominee for PPP predecessor Liberty Korea Party in the 2017 presidential election, rose sharply in polls, making Hong the most significant contender to Yoon since the beginning of the campaign cycle. A 6 September poll of contenders across all parties showed support for Hong at 13.6%, up from 4.2% a week earlier, behind Yoon who had support at 26.4%.

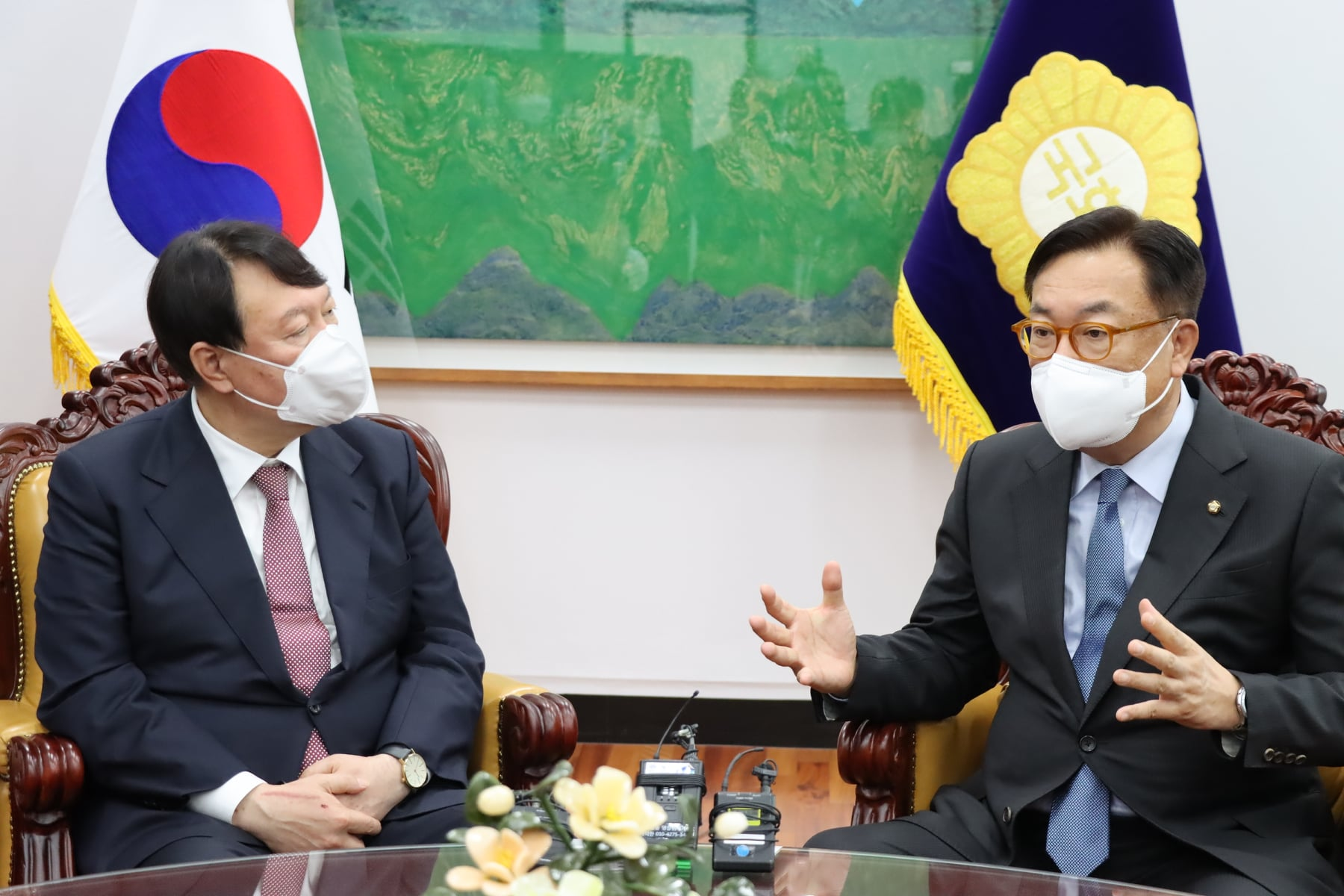
Yoon with then-Deputy Speaker of the National Assembly Chung Jin-suk in November 2021

During primary debates amongst PPP presidential candidates, Yoon appeared to have the hanja character for "king" written on his left palm, a shamanist talisman for good luck. Yoon's primary opponents, including Hong Joon-pyo and Yoo Seong-min, criticized Yoon for using shamanist practices and made comparisons to the Choi Soon-sil scandal. In response to the criticism, Yoon stated that "a supporter drew that as a message of support, encouraging me to be confident like a 'king' during the debate" and that he had forgotten to wash the mark off.

In October 2021, Yoon made complimentary remarks about the former authoritarian military dictator of South Korea, Chun Doo-hwan. The remarks came during a meeting with People Power Party officials in Busan, during which Yoon said that "many people still consider Chun as having done well in politics, except the military coup and the Gwangju Uprising", later adding that he believed even people in Honam, the geographic area including Gwangju, felt the same way. Chun Doo-hwan, a widely maligned figure in South Korea, was responsible for numerous human rights abuses, including the torture and killings of innocent civilians. Yoon apologized for these remarks. However, news media and members of the Democratic Party speculated that a picture he posted on Instagram and later deleted indicated that the apology was insincere. The photo was of him feeding an apple to his dog, and some observed that the Korean words for "apple" and "apology" (사과) are homonyms; however, Yoon later denied the alleged symbolism of the photo. Yoon again apologized for his remarks when he visited the May 18th National Cemetery in Gwangju on 10 November, although his visit was met by protesters.

On 5 November 2021, Yoon officially won the nomination of the People Power Party for the 2022 presidential election. The win came after Yoon fought off a surge in support for rival candidate Hong Joon-pyo in the latter weeks of the primary. The nomination resulted from a four-day period of voting by party members and the general public. Yoon Suk Yeol won 47.85% of the votes, a total of 347,963 votes, and of the remaining candidates Hong Joon-pyo won 41.50% of the votes, Yoo Seong-min won 7.47% of the votes, and Won Hee-ryong won 3.17% of the votes. On 7 November 2021, Yoon stated that if he were elected president, he would pardon former presidents Lee Myung-bak and Park Geun-hye, both of whom were serving lengthy prison sentences for corruption (Park Geun-hye was later pardoned by President Moon Jae-in on 24 December of that same year).

Yoon narrowly won the 2022 presidential election that took place on 9 March 2022. Democratic Party candidate Lee Jae Myung conceded defeat in the early hours of the following day. Yoon won 48.56% of the votes, while Lee Jae Myung won 47.83% of the vote. Yoon's presidential election victory was by the closest margin in South Korean history.

== Presidency (2022–2025) ==
=== Relocation of presidential office ===
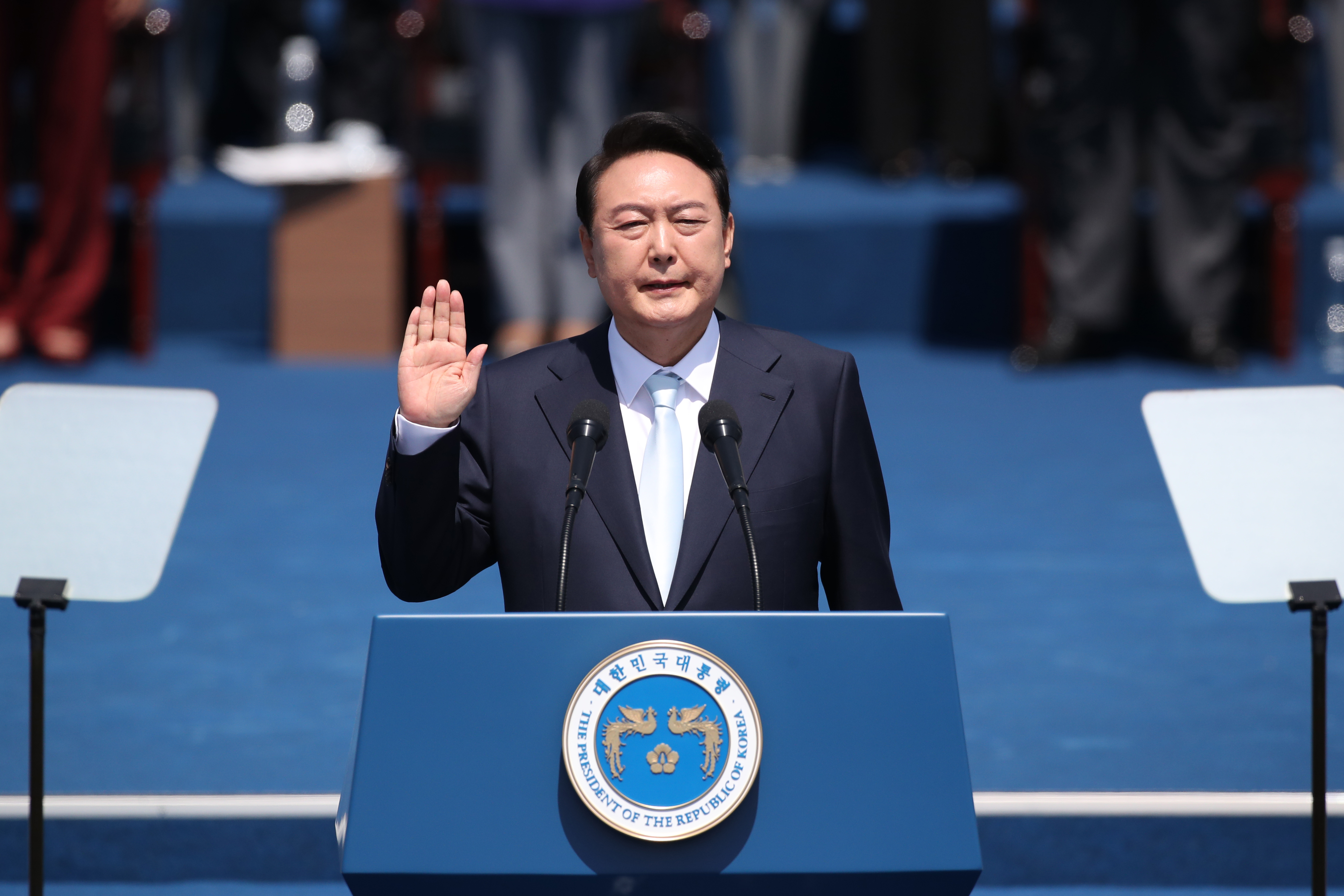
Yoon takes the presidential oath of office outside of the National Assembly on 10 May 2022.

On 20 March 2022, Yoon announced that he would establish his presidential office in the Ministry of National Defense building in Yongsan District, Seoul, instead of the Blue House, which opened to the public as a park on 10 May 2022. He would take office that day. Newspaper The Hankyoreh accused Yoon of being frequently late to work, while sending decoy vehicles near 9:00 a.m., when work starts for governmental workers.

=== Economic policy ===
In 2023, Yoon attempted to raise South Korea's maximum weekly working hours from 52 to 69. However, widespread backlash, especially from the youth, led him to order government agencies to reconsider the plan.

The minimum wage for 2025 was set at 10,030 won per hour. Some labor representatives walked out in protest, saying the increase rate was too low, but most management and public interest representatives voted to adopt the minimum wage at 10,030 won.

==== Fiscal policy stance ====
Yoon administration emphasized sound fiscal policy and declared fiscal austerity policy. According to the 2022–2026 National Fiscal Management Plan, Yoon Suk Yeol government considered that the national debt increased rapidly due to the expanded fiscal management of the previous government. Yoon declared to stabilize the rate of increase in national debt and improve the government's deficit to secure 'fiscal sustainability'.

Yoon administration announced a plan to reform the fiscal rules proposed by the previous government into a "simpler and stricter fiscal rule." First, the administration simplified the management indicators, which had previously been based on a complex calculation formula. The management indicator was revised from the Consolidated fiscal balance to the stricter 'managed fiscal balance'. It excludes social security fund balance—which is currently in surplus—from the Consolidated Fiscal Balance. This change aimed to provide a more accurate reflection of the nation's fiscal reality and enable stricter management. Furthermore, the new fiscal rule aimed to enhance legal enforceability by incorporating it into a 'law'. The new fiscal rule also includes an exemption for situations where it is difficult to apply the rule; however, unlike before, the rule will be immediately reapplied once the crisis ends.

Under its fiscal austerity policy, the Yoon Suk-yeol administration has asserted that government borrowing is inappropriate and that private investment should be encouraged instead. It aimed to establish a private-sector-led economy by using market autonomy and dynamism as drivers of economic growth. For example, the government committed 4.5 trillion KRW to key strategic technologies such as semiconductors and quantum, with a specific allocation of 1 trillion KRW to the semiconductor industry, demonstrating a strong intent to foster related talent and core technology development. Budgets supporting promising domestic venture companies and small business owners were also increased.

Additionally, several tax reduction policies targeting businesses were implemented to enhance corporate competitiveness. In July 2022, the administration announced a tax reform plan that included easing corporate tax rates and adjusting tax base. The government proposal aimed to reduce the top corporate tax rate from 25% to 22% and apply a special preferential rate of 10% to small and medium-sized enterprises with a tax base of 500 million KRW or less. (Previously, companies with a tax base exceeding 200 million KRW were subject to a 20% tax rate.) This proposal was later amended during its passage through the National Assembly, resulting in a 1% reduction across all existing tax bases, rather than the government's initial plan. Also the government announced a proposal to expand the eligibility criteria for 'business succession tax deductions' and increase the deduction limits, aiming to facilitate smoother generational transitions for small and medium-sized companies. As a result, in 2023, the deduction amount for mid-sized enterprises surged by approximately 600% compared to 2022, reaching about 188.9 billion KRW. Small and medium-sized enterprises also saw their deduction amounts double compared to 2022.

Austerity policies, by their nature, aim to reduce government expenditure and are typically pursued in conjunction with tax increase policies. Yoon administration also announced in its National Fiscal Management Plan that it would rationalize non-taxable and exemption systems and continue efforts to expand the tax base by strengthening the management of tax avoidance. However, the reduction of corporate tax and the expansion of business succession tax deductions, adopted under the government's stance of avoiding borrowing and instead stimulating private investment, were criticized as being contradictory to its fiscal austerity policy.

=== Energy policy ===
Responding to widespread public concerns after the Fukushima nuclear accident in Japan, President Moon Jae-in decided to gradually phase out nuclear power in South Korea. However, the nuclear policy was again reversed in 2023 by President Yoon Suk Yeol, resuming construction of nuclear reactors and expanding nuclear output to 34.6% share of South Korea's electricity generation by 2036. Yoon pledged to boost nuclear energy use and reduce carbon emissions by 40% from 2018 levels by 2030.

On 17 July 2024, the Korea Hydro & Nuclear Power won the tender for the construction of two new units at Dukovany Nuclear Power Station in the Czech Republic. Yoon said: "We will use the Czech nuclear project as a stepping stone to further expand export opportunities for our nuclear industry."

=== Gender equality policy ===
Following an anti-feminist backlash in 2022, Yoon has acted in opposition to feminism in order to appeal to young men. Yoon has also said that structural sexism no longer exists in South Korea. He entered office with a pledge to abolish the Ministry of Gender Equality and Family. Political conflict related to issues of gender was intense in South Korea in 2022. He announced that the new government would not address gender as a collective issue but rather focus on and respond to specific individual issues.

As of May 2022, there were only three women among the State Councilors of the Yoon Suk Yeol government and only two women among the vice-ministerial level officials. This was criticized as a lack of women's representation in the government. In response to these criticisms, Yoon appointed Park Soon-ae as the Minister of Education and Kim Seung-hee as the Minister of Welfare, increasing the ratio of female-to-male ministers in the cabinet to 30%. However, Park Soon-ae resigned on 5 August, just 34 days into her tenure, and Yoon's approval rating had fallen from 30% to 24%, largely due to public backlash against Park's school reform plans.

=== 2022 police bureau proposal ===
In late July 2022, Yoon proposed the creation of a "police bureau" in order to ensure greater government oversight of the police force. In response, several police officers protested, claiming the measure was a dictatorial measure to compromise the political neutrality of the police.

In response to the protests, Lee Sang-min, Yoon's Interior Minister, compared them to the 1979 Coup d'état of December Twelfth, though he later walked back the remarks. Yoon himself also criticized the protests, saying, "Like many, I am also deeply concerned about the collective protest of the police chiefs", and calling it a "serious breach" of police discipline.

Following the protests, the presidential office threatened to punish police officers. Additional remarks by Yoon Hee-keun, President Yoon's choice as Commissioner General of the National Police Agency, further inflamed tensions by suggesting that police should focus on wages rather than the establishment of a police bureau.

=== 2022 Seoul crowd crush ===
On 29 October 2022, at least 158 people were crushed to death when a crowd surged in an alleyway during Halloween festivities in Seoul's Itaewon district. Yoon declared a state of official national mourning. His handling of the crowd crush garnered criticism.

=== Medical crisis ===
On 6 February 2024, Yoon announced that the enrollment quota for medical students would be increased from 3,058 to 5,058 students per academic year from 2025 onward. The quota had last been fixed in 2006. The announcement was met with opposition from the medical community, with the Korea Medical Association and Korea Intern Resident Association organizing intern and resident doctor strikes and resignations since 20 February 2024. They argued that the planned increase would not resolve the issues of inadequate manpower in rural areas but would increase the inequality of medical care between rural and urban areas.

Yoon gave an hour-long nation address to reaffirm the quota increase and appeal to the public. The government labeled the collective criticism and social advocacy of medical students, residents, and doctors as "doctors' illegal collective actions" and declared a national healthcare crisis of the highest risk level. The Central Disaster and Safety Countermeasures Headquarters for Doctors' Collective Actions, led by the Prime Minister, was then established. The Emergency Response Headquarters conducted daily public briefings. Pro-government advertisements featured the president's commitment and included promotional videos in movie theater displays on public buses and subways, while screens inside apartment elevators criticized "emergency room ping-pong" and "pediatric clinic open run". Doctors and the medical community were portrayed as a self-serving cartel, a characterization cemented by the president in a national address.

=== 2024 parliamentary elections ===
The opposition's landslide victory in the 2024 parliamentary elections put Yoon in an even weaker position. The PPP obtained 108 seats, 36% of the National Assembly, while the main opposition party, the DPK, won 175 seats in total. The remaining 17 seats are held by the other members of the 22nd Assembly.

Some have spoken of Yoon as a "lame duck" following the major defeat. He is the first president to see an assembly unfavorable to him during a whole presidency and especially an opposition that is growing in relation to the first part of the mandate. The Chairman of the PPP Emergency Committee, Han Dong-hoon, resigned following the defeat; several other major government figures also presented their resignation, including Yoon's Prime Minister Han Duck-soo.

Yoon boycotted the opening of the inaugural session of the new National Assembly on 2 September, making him the first South Korean leader not to attend the ceremony since the restoration of democracy in 1988. His office said that he did not attend saying that the chamber "overissues demands for special prosecutor investigations and impeachments".

=== Foreign policy ===
In December 2022, the Yoon administration announced the Indo-Pacific Strategy, a comprehensive strategy that encompasses the economic and security spheres of Indo-Pacific countries: "We (South Korea) will work [towards] a regional order that enables a different set of countries to cooperate and procedures together." On 25 July 2023, Yoon visited Ukraine after visiting Lithuania and Poland for the NATO summit. He visited Bucha and Irpin, cities near the capital city of Kyiv. He also held the 2023 South Korea-Pacific Islands Summit and the 2024 South Korea-Africa Summit for the first time and has also been promoting the Korea-Central Asia Summit.

Additionally, Yoon has visited the United States and considered sending weapons to Ukraine following the invasion by Russia.

In October 2023, Yoon condemned the October 7 attacks. He sought to strengthen relations with Saudi Arabia and supported the participation of South Korean companies in Saudi Arabia's Neom smart city project. In February 2024, South Korea and Saudi Arabia signed a memorandum of understanding to expand defense cooperation.

As of December 2023, during his tenure so far, Yoon has made trips to twenty-six countries. He has met with fellow leaders, such as during the NATO Summit Madrid 2022, APEC Summit, G20, and G7.

Yoon later attended the NATO summit in Lithuania the following year. He also attended the United Nations General Assembly and Global Fund's Seventh Replenishment Conference in New York City; he additionally met with U.S. President Joe Biden.

==== G7 ====
Although South Korea is not a member of the G7, it is being considered as a potential next member if the G7 expands; it has also been promoting the G7 Plus initiative. At the G7 summit in May 2023, Yoon met with the leaders of the Quad nations and called for addressing regional challenges and providing infrastructure and development assistance. In his speech to G7 members, Yoon stressed South Korea's continued commitment to maintaining the international rule of law and the need to protect Ukraine's freedom and peace.

==== United States ====
Yoon with U.S. President Joe Biden in the Oval Office in April 2023

During U.S. House Speaker Nancy Pelosi's visit to South Korea on 4 August 2022, which was part of a larger tour of Asia, Yoon snubbed a meeting with her, stating that he wanted to enjoy his vacation.

In April 2023, Yoon and First Lady Kim Keon Hee were invited to the U.S. by politicians Kevin McCarthy and Chuck Schumer. On 25 April, Yoon and Kim arrived in Washington, D.C. to mark 70 years of the alliance between the Republic of Korea and the United States. In a speech to the U.S. Congress on 27 April, Yoon proclaimed "we know that no matter where you sit, you stand with Korea", adding that the South Korea-U.S. relationship is "stronger than ever".

According to a Yonhap article published on 7 November 2024, Yoon had a 12-minute phone call with the US president-elect Donald Trump where they talked about trilateral cooperation with the U.S. and Japan, as well as the North Korean situation involving Ukraine.

Despite Trump's declaration that he will end the war in Ukraine, one analyst argued that Yoon is making a mistake by leaving open the possibility of providing defense weapons to Ukraine. Some have opined that if the United States completely stops supporting Ukraine, South Korea could be left alone in the war in Ukraine with Russia as its enemy. In addition, some have claimed that if Trump sets out to improve relations with North Korea, the South Korean government's position could be extremely limited in a situation where inter-Korea relations have weakened to the point where North Korea has declared two hostile countries.

==== North Korea ====
Since Yoon's inauguration in 2022, Yoon's administration has continued to make strong statements and take hard-line policies against North Korea. During these period, North and South Korean relations have been described as having rapidly regressed, with military confrontation intensifying and dialogue channels effectively blocked. On 15 August 2022, marking the National Liberation Day of Korea, Yoon unveiled a plan that could include a "large-scale food program", as well as plans to improve North Korea air and sea ports, enhance agricultural productivity, strengthen health care infrastructure and attract foreign investment on the condition North Korea takes "genuine and substantive" moves towards denuclearization.

In November 2023, Yoon's government suspended South Korea's participation in the Comprehensive Agreement Pact – a pact aimed at lowering tensions between South and North Korea – after North Korea launched a satellite into space. On 15 August 2024, Yoon outlined his policy on Korean reunification, calling for a "unified Republic of Korea"; this was the first time this term was used by a South Korean administration. It was seen as South Korea's most explicit policy statement to date in support of unification by absorption, referring to unifying the Korean Peninsula under the Republic of Korea. He called on efforts to increase support among North Koreans for a "freedom-based unification", which he said would be done by expanding efforts to increase North Korean people's access to information.

==== Japan ====
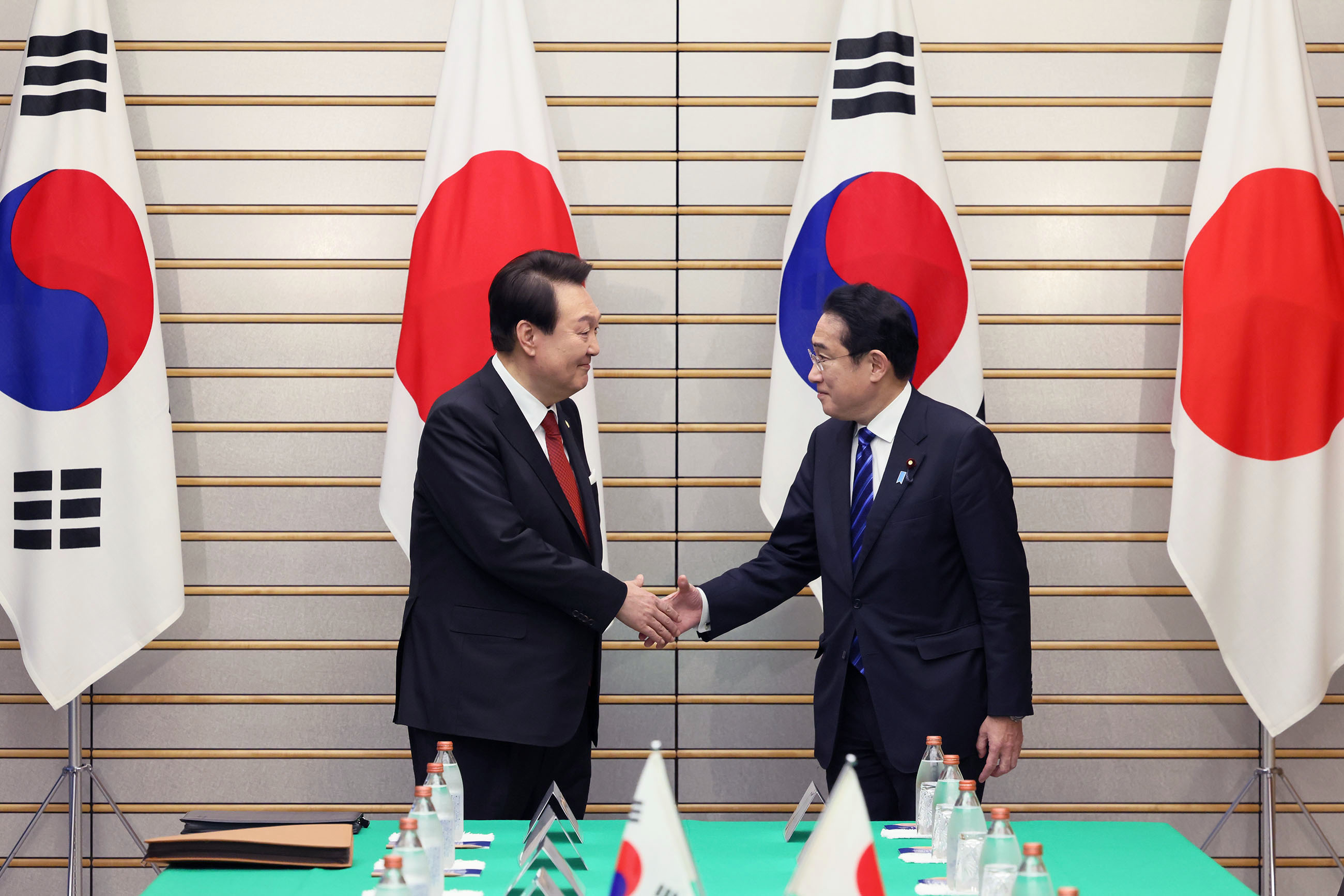
Yoon met with Japanese Prime Minister Fumio Kishida on 16 March 2023

Yoon has been accused of having a pro-Japanese stance on historical issues and colonialism by liberals and some conservative politicians in South Korea. In particular, some have criticized Yoon's government close relationship with the "far-right" Japanophilic New Right movement.

Yoon's government has not sought direct compensation or apology from the Japanese government and companies for victims of forced labor, a war crime committed by the Empire of Japan government and Japanese companies during World War II. Instead, Yoon's government has expressed its stance to receive voluntary donations from South Korean companies through a third-party foundation as a solution to the 2018 South Korean Supreme Court ruling which demanded compensation from the Japanese government and companies for past war crimes against victims who were forcibly recruited by the Japanese Empire during World War II. The DPK criticized this, stating "it tramples on the victims and represents the interests of Japanese corporations". The Justice Party (JP) also joined the DPK in "declarations of the state of affairs" (시국선언) to criticize Yoon's government. As of March 2023, 11 of the 15 surviving victims opposed Yoon's government's solution and demanded direct compensation from the Japanese government and companies.

Yoon's remarks at a commemorative event related to the Samiljeol (3.1 절 or 삼일절), 1 March 2023 caused a great controversy in South Korea. Samiljeol is a national holiday that celebrates Koreans' spirit of resistance to regain their identity from colonial Japan. Yoon said, "Korea lost its national sovereignty and suffered because it was not properly prepared for historical changes in the world at the time, and we should reflect on this past." The remarks drew criticism from the opposition parties in the South Korea as "Chinil" (친일), "colonialist historical perspective" (식민사관), and "pro-Japanese highly submissive diplomacy" (친일 굴종외교); Yoon was compared to Lee Wan-yong. The DPK and the JP also strongly criticized his remarks.

On 16 March 2023, Prime Minister Fumio Kishida held a summit with Yoon in Tokyo to settle wartime labor disputes among other issues. Yoon also met with Constitutional Democratic Party of Japan (CDP) leader Kenta Izumi who discussed several bilateral disputes between the countries with Yoon including the Statue of Peace, which Izumi asked Yoon to remove.

On 7 May 2023, Kishida visited Seoul in a historic trip to further deepen ties. Yoon emphasized that historical issues had to be "completely settled". Kishida also expressed sympathy to Korean victims of colonial Japan. However, Kishida was criticized by many South Korean media because he did not "apologize" for forced labor victims during World War II and did not mention Japan's responsibility for war crimes. Some South Korean politicians also expressed strong dissatisfaction that Kishida did not apologize.

Yoon and Kishida met with Biden on 18 August 2023 at Camp David in the United States. The three announced the Camp David Principles, a set of strategies to counter the influence of China, North Korea, and Russia as well as limit the risk of economic disruptions in the future.

Some sources criticized the compromise between the Japanese LDP and Yoon governments to list Sado mine as a World Heritage Site, which distorted history by removing direct references to "forced labor" by Koreans.

==== Ukraine ====
In a Reuters interview on 19 April 2023, Yoon hinted at supplying lethal aid to Ukraine, stating that "If there is a situation the international community cannot condone, such as any large-scale attack on civilians, massacre or serious violation of the laws of war, it might be difficult for us to insist only on humanitarian or financial support." Previously, South Korea had only provided humanitarian and economic aid to Ukraine. Yoon linked the struggle in Ukraine to the Korean War when the international community supported South Korea. He added, "I believe there won't be limitations to the extent of the support to defend and restore a country that's been illegally invaded both under international and domestic law. However, considering our relationship with the parties engaged in the war and developments in the battlefield, we will take the most appropriate measures."

In response, former Russian President Dmitry Medvedev suggested that Russia could supply North Korea on a "quid pro quo" basis. The DPK, JP, and Progressive Party, along with other liberal and progressive parties, opposed the Yoon administration's policy toward Ukraine, fearing that his pro-Ukraine diplomacy would lead to Russia supporting North Korea's weapons and South Korean companies being penalized by Russia's economic sanctions.

In July 2023, Yoon visited Ukraine after visiting Lithuania and Poland for the NATO summit. Specifically, he visited Bucha and Irpin. In August 2023, Yoon announced that South Korea would provide $394 million in financial aid to Ukraine for 2024, an eightfold increase from 2023. On 7 November 2024, Yoon suggested that South Korea could provide weapons to Ukraine. However, the South Korean public was widely opposed to direct arms supplies to Ukraine.

==== Africa ====
In his welcoming speech to the Africa Night held in Seoul in November 2022, President Yoon said that "Africa is a land of new opportunity", indicating his intention to strengthen cooperation with Africa. The event was attended by African ambassadors and nominees from 31 countries, and President William Ruto of Kenya.

Yoon also held summit with the leaders of the Central African Republic, Nigeria, Gabon, and Kenya in 2022. To accelerate the push for a South Korea-Africa FTA, Yoon said he would invite African leaders to a special summit in South Korea in 2024. "The existing ministerial-level Korea-Africa Forum will be upgraded to the head of state", he added.

=== Controversies ===
==== MBC lawsuit ====
The PPP sued four senior executives of broadcaster Munhwa Broadcasting Corporation, including MBC TV head Park Sung-je, on grounds of defamation after news outlets initially reported that Yoon insulted the U.S. Congress. On 21 September 2022, after chatting with U.S. President Joe Biden outside the seventh Global Fund meeting in New York City, Yoon was filmed telling his aides and top diplomats, "Wouldn't [inaudible] lose face if these saekki do not pass it in the legislature?" Although the audio is hard to discern, MBC, which broke the story on air, determined in its subtitles that he said "Biden" in an apparent reference to the latter's bid to increase the American contribution to the Global Fund by $6 billion, an act that would require congressional approval. Yoon's office denies that he was talking about Biden or the U.S. Congress; instead, it claims that he was expressing concern that his country's opposition-controlled parliament would reject his plans for a $100 million contribution to the same fund, and his press secretary Kim Eun-hye suggested that the word he uttered was not "Biden", but "nallimyeon", a similar-sounding word that means "to blow or waste". The video swiftly went viral, having been viewed repeatedly by millions. The controversy has also brought press freedom in South Korea to the public eye over the PPP's civil conduct involving MBC, with some press freedom groups, including the International Federation of Journalists, criticizing the lawsuit as politically motivated. A poll of 1,002 adult Koreans found his approval rating falling to 27.7 percent, a 3.7 percent drop from three weeks before, and that the majority (61.2 percent) believed Yoon said "Biden" compared to the 26.9 percent who thought he said "nallimyeon"; another poll of 1,000 adult Koreans found an even greater majority (70.8 percent) who said that he should directly apologize for his profanity versus the 27.9 percent who said he did not need to apologize. The Korean Ministry of Foreign Affairs sued MBC "to restore trust in diplomacy"; this has been likened to the oppression of journalists by the Lee Myung-bak government in the past.

==== R&D budget cut ====
The decision by the Yoon administration to reduce South Korea's research and development (R&D) budget by 15% for 2024 compared to the previous year has caused significant uproar among researchers. There are growing concerns that this cutback might undermine South Korea's competitiveness in the global technology sector.

The move faced strong opposition, highlighted by an event at the Korea Advanced Institute of Science and Technology (KAIST). A student protested the budget reduction during a graduation ceremony while Yoon was giving his speech but was immediately restrained by bodyguards who were disguised as students.

==== Soldier deaths ====
Yoon was accused of covering up for senior military officials over the deaths of one South Korean marine in 2023 and two more soldiers in 2024 by blocking bills seeking to investigate the matter. His exercise of veto power, one of the highest among South Korean presidents, led to increased confrontation with the opposition in the parliament.

==== Allegations of favoring the New Right ====
Yoon has appointed people affiliated with the controversial South Korean New Right movement to prominent positions in government and public life. According to a report by Kyunghyang Shinmun, at least 21 New Right figures were holding 25 key positions in eight public institutions and committees related to Korean history under Yoon's administration.

The New Right reportedly has more favorable views of the 1910–1945 Japanese colonial period. In 2024, Yoon's administration appointed people described as New Right members to the positions of director and chairman of the Independence Hall of Korea, an organization that commemorates the liberation of Korea from Japanese colonial rule. The Korea Liberation Association, an organization commemorating Korean independence, protested these decisions. In November 2024, an event by the Korea Liberation Association was scheduled to be held at Seoul National Cemetery, but the Ministry of Patriots and Veterans Affairs blocked the event from being held. Critics alleged that the Yoon administration was retaliating against the association for criticizing the administration's New Right tendencies.

==== First Lady political scandal ====
Yoon vetoed a special prosecutor bill on investigating allegations of corruption related to himself and his wife Kim Keon Hee. He has received criticism for this. On 28 January 2026, Seoul Central District Court sentenced Kim to 20 months in prison for corruption, for receiving luxury gifts like a Graff diamond necklace and a Chanel bag from the Unification Church in return for promises of business favors.

==== Queen Elizabeth II's funeral ====
While in London for the funeral of Queen Elizabeth II, Yoon's opponents accused him of disrespect when he missed the chance to view the Queen's coffin lying in state, which he blamed on traffic.

==== Democratic backsliding and media suppression ====
In 2024, the Swedish V-Dem Institute reported that under Yoon's administration, South Korea was dropping in its liberal democracy index (LDI). They described Yoon as "South Korea's Donald Trump". Specifically, they wrote:

[The 2021 elections] brought the right-wing and conservative Yoon Suk-yeol to power. His recent professional history already showed abuse of power. The change of president set South Korea back on a downward slope. President Yoon Suk-yeol's coercive measures to punish members of the former Moon administration, along with attacks on gender equality, set South Korea to decrease its LDI levels, forming a bell-turn. Although South Korea remains a liberal democracy at the end of 2023, Moon's efforts have been virtually neutralized.

South Korea's ranking in the World Press Freedom Index by Reporters Without Borders dropped from 47th place to 62nd place from 2023 to May 2024. This was reportedly influenced by the Yoon administration's excessive use of sanctions against media outlets and journalists that were critical of the government, such as MBC. In particular, a hot mic incident reported on by an MBC journalist resulted in a police raid on the journalist's house and a retaliatory banning of MBC from access to Yoon. Other similar raids on the homes of journalists were conducted, with the justification of criminal defamation against Yoon. Outlets that have aligned with Yoon reportedly received preferential treatment.

An MBC report alleged that Yoon was influencing investigations conducted by the police. Critics alleged that the police, under Yoon, were quick to investigate labor unions and the media but cautious when investigating issues related to Yoon. For example, an order related to First Lady Kim Keon Hee that was issued by the National Assembly was subsequently blocked by the police. In November 2024, critics alleged that police, under orders of the Yoon administration, were being used to suppress anti-government protests. According to MBC, police unsuccessfully applied for four arrest warrants for protestors. Some argued that these actions contradicted a 2021 Supreme Court of Korea ruling.

The frequency of government officials not attending National Assembly sessions increased under Yoon's administration. Over a period of one year and four months from May 2022 to August 2023, there were 29 non-attendances by heads of government departments, vice ministers, and heads of affiliated organizations. President Yoon was also heavily criticised for overusing the right to veto bills.

In November 2024, over 3,000 professors and researchers at various universities signed a declaration asking Yoon to resign. One interviewer speculated that the declaration was the largest such action from academics since protests during the Park Geun-hye administration. On 28 November, 1,466 South Korean Catholic priests called for Yoon to be impeached. They issued a declaration titled "How can a person be like this" (어째서 사람이 이 모양인가).

=== Public approval ===
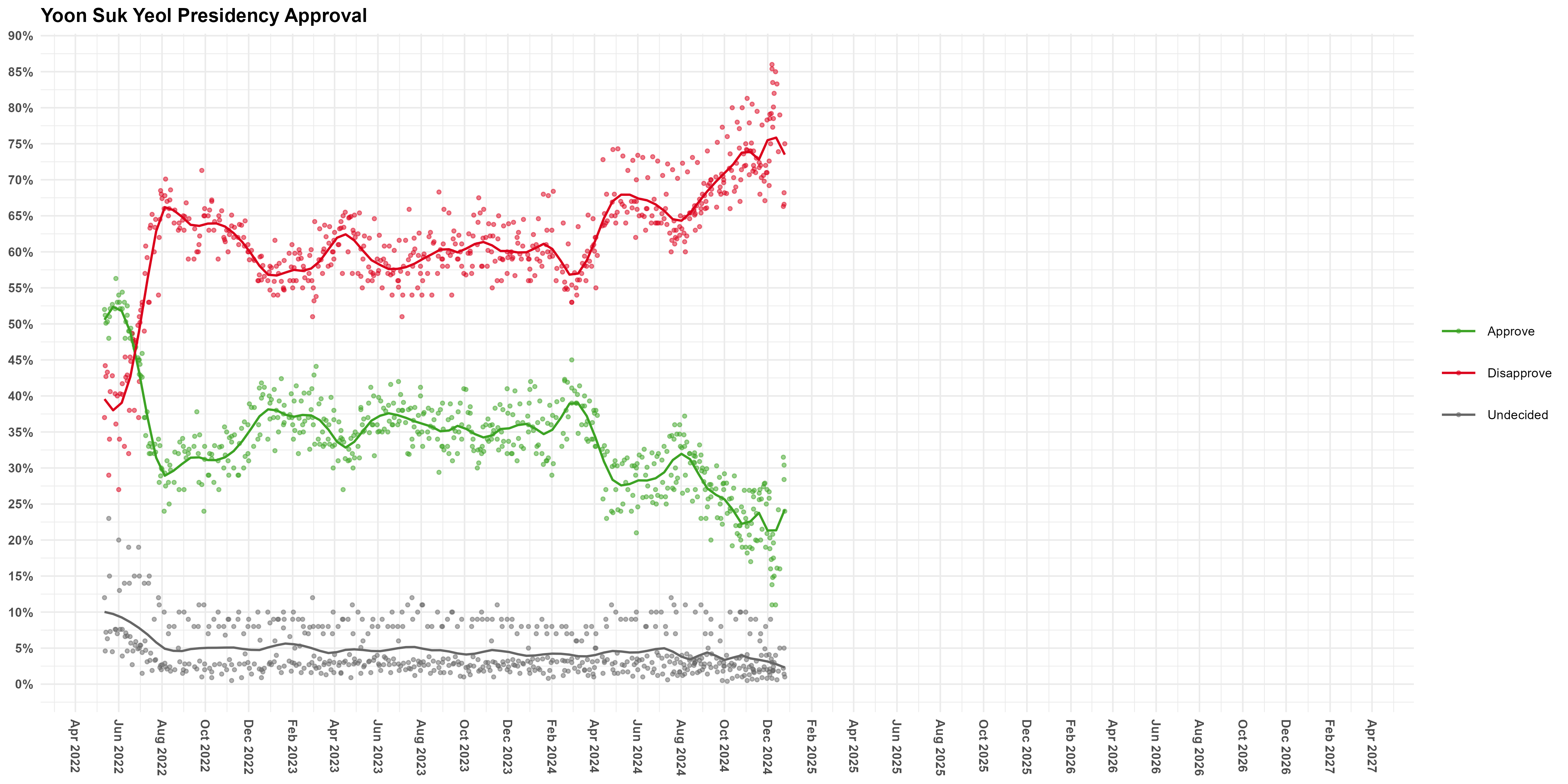
Local regression curve of the opinion polling

Less than three months into his presidency, Yoon's approval rating dropped to less than 30 percent amidst the 2021–2023 inflation surge, a controversial education policy rollout (including a proposal to lower the starting elementary school age from six to five), controversies over nepotism in personnel appointments, the police bureau proposal, and conflicts within the PPP. His popularity fell further to 19% in August. In December, Yoon's approval rating rose back to above 40% for the first time in five months. By April 2023, it dropped back to 30% largely due to widespread disapproval of Yoon's Japanese policy. In May 2024, Yoon recorded the lowest approval rating since he took office at a rate of 21%, with his economic and foreign policy, as well as his lack of communication, being cited as the main reasons for the low approval rating. In June and July 2024, over a million people signed a petition calling for Yoon to be impeached.

Following his brief attempt to declare martial law, a poll by Gallup held from 3 to 5 December 2024 found that Yoon's approval rating had fallen to 13% in part due to the declaration of martial law. A week later, Gallup found that his approval rating fell further to 11%.

== Removal from office ==
=== Declaration of martial law ===
On 3 December 2024, Yoon attempted a self-coup by declaring martial law. During the declaration, he vowed to "rebuild a democratic and free Korea" after accusing other South Korean politicians of being "communist". As part of this, Yoon and Minister of National Defense Kim Yong-hyun allegedly ordered the flying of drones into North Korea to provoke an armed conflict between the two countries, without the knowledge of the Ministry of National Defense or the Joint Chiefs of Staff. The decree was soon declared invalid by the National Assembly in a unanimous vote of 190–0; however, the military command stated that it would remain in place until the president lifted it. Hours after the National Assembly voted to rescind martial law, Yoon complied and lifted the declaration after his cabinet convened.

On 7 December 2024, Yoon issued an apology in a televised address following widespread criticism over his declaration of martial law. He expressed regret for the decision and assured the public that such actions would not be repeated. The incident led to political turmoil, with opposition leaders and some ruling party members calling for his resignation. On 8 December, Kim Yong-hyun was arrested for his role in the martial law order, after resigning from office three days prior.

Subsequent investigations revealed that President Yoon ordered Commander Kwak, and Capital Defense Commander Lee Jin-woo to break through the plenary chamber doors to drag the lawmakers out at 00:40 to 00:50 hours, which was too late as the lawmakers had begun the session to end martial law at that time. In the indictment of former Defense Minister Kim Yong-hyun on 27 December by the special prosecution team, it also revealed Yoon told Commander Lee, "break down the doors, even if it means shooting" and "even if martial law is lifted, I just have to declare martial law two or three times, so keep going." Minister Kim also prioritized the arrests and detention of Lee Jae Myung, Woo Won-shik, and Han Dong-hoon from the National Assembly.

On 9 December 2024, the Ministry of Justice issued an overseas travel ban against Yoon following an investigation into allegations of rebellion linked to his brief imposition of martial law. A senior officer from the National Police Agency stated that Yoon could have faced detention if specific conditions were met. Although sitting South Korean presidents are generally immune from prosecution while in office, this immunity does not extend to accusations of rebellion or treason, leaving Yoon vulnerable to legal action.

On 11 December 2024, South Korean police attempted to search Yoon's office as part of an investigation into his controversial declaration of martial law. The search was blocked as investigators failed to reach an agreement with the presidential security service.

Despite being suspended from public duties, Yoon would receive a 3 percent increase of about 7.5 million won to his salary compared to the previous year, according to the Ministry of Personnel Management.

==== Calls for resignation ====
On the morning of 4 December 2024, following the end of martial law, a large number of Yoon's staff immediately resigned such as Jeong Jin-seok, Kim Yong-hyun, and many other presidential secretaries. Additional staff also offered to resign. On 8 December 2024, PPP leader Han Dong-hoon stated that Yoon would resign as early as February 2025 if he remained in office. A PPP special task force proposed that Yoon leave office in February or March 2025 and called for elections to replace him to be held in April or May. However, on 12 December, Yoon issued a statement vowing to "fight to the end", resisting the push for his resignation, and claiming the martial law declaration was a legitimate "act of governance" against "forces and criminal groups that have been responsible for paralysing the country's government".

==== Impeachment ====
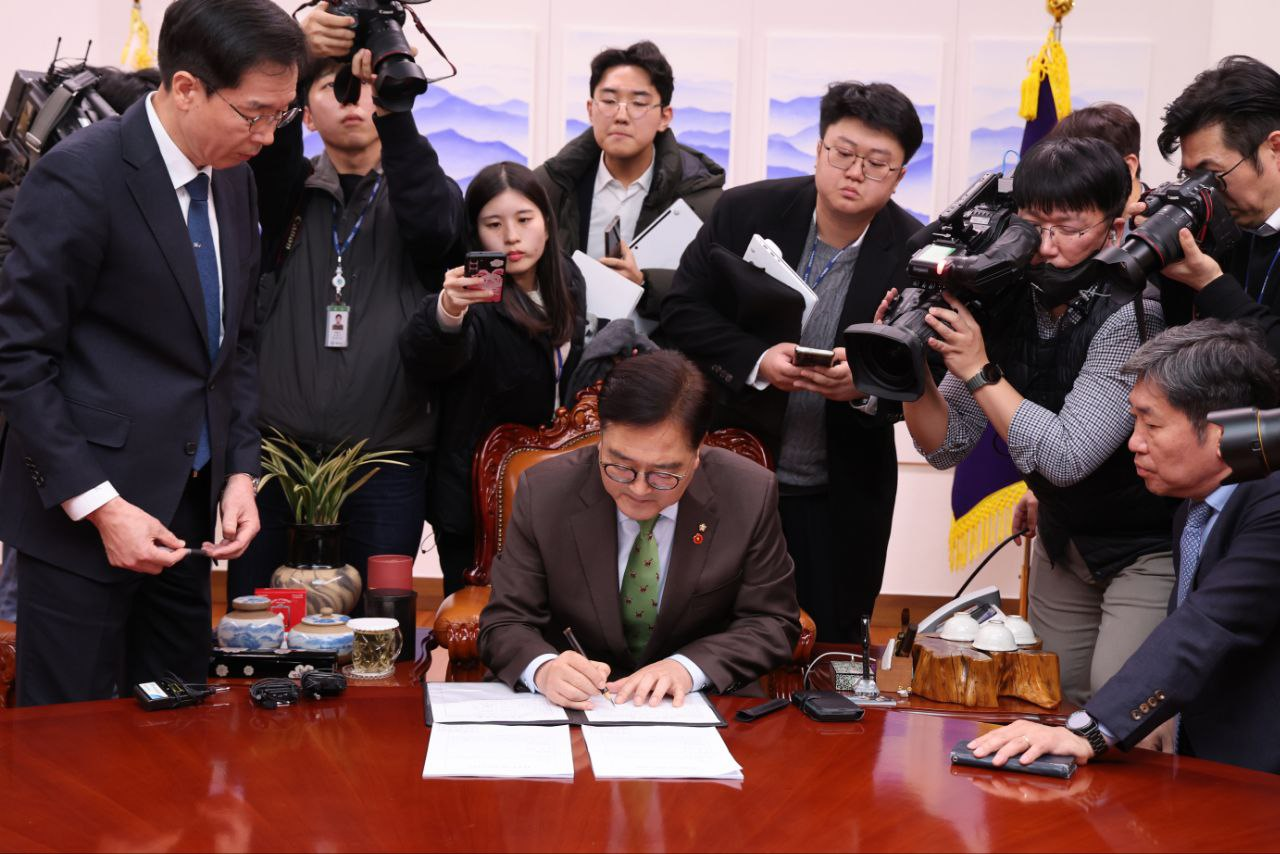
Speaker of the National Assembly Woo Won-shik signing the motion for impeachment

On 4 December, approximately 190 members of the National Assembly across six opposition parties submitted a motion for impeachment, with the intent to discuss it in the Assembly the following day and vote on the motion on 7 December. Police opened an investigation after cases of treason were also filed against Yoon for his declaration of martial law. The Democratic Party also proposed appointing a permanent special counsel to investigate Yoon for treason.

On 7 December, Yoon apologized for declaring martial law, describing it as a "desperate decision made by me, the president, as the final authority responsible for state affairs" and saying that it would not be repeated. He also pledged to delegate his political functions to the PPP. Later that day, the impeachment vote failed after only 195 lawmakers present of the 200 needed to impeach attended the National Assembly following a boycott by all but three MPs from the PPP. On 9 December, the Ministry of Justice legally barred Yoon from traveling abroad.

On 14 December, a second impeachment motion filed against him passed in the National Assembly after 204 lawmakers, including 12 from the PPP, voted in favor. His powers and duties were suspended and taken over temporarily by Prime Minister Han Duck-soo pending a final decision by the Constitutional Court of Korea. On 27 December, Han was also impeached on charges that included obstructing investigations against Yoon and his wife, colluding with Yoon on martial law and blocking the appointment of justices to fill vacancies in the Constitutional Court.

On 7 January 2025, it was reported that the Corruption Investigation Office for High-ranking Officials (CIO) was investigating Yoon for treason based on evidence that he had attempted to manufacture a conflict with North Korea by launching a drone from Baengnyeongdo.

On 14 January 2025, the impeachment proceedings against Yoon were abruptly suspended after a brief period, as he failed to attend the session at the Constitutional Court. Subsequent hearings were held until 25 February 2025. Yoon attended the proceedings for the first time on 21 January, during which he denied ordering soldiers to interfere with the proceedings of the National Assembly against the martial law declaration. On 25 February, he issued an apology on the last day of the impeachment trial, but continued to defend his actions. The trial concluded with a total of 11 hearings held over 73 days and 16 people testifying as witnesses.

==== Arrest warrant, political standoff and arrest ====
Yoon was summoned thrice by the CIO for questioning on 18, 25, and 29 December 2024 over his declaration of martial law. He refused to attend any of the summons.

On 31 December, the Seoul Western District Court issued an arrest warrant for Yoon with charges relating to abuse of power and orchestration of the martial law declaration. Yoon holed himself up in the presidential residence where hundreds of his supporters gathered and engaged in clashes with police and opponents of Yoon. On 1 January 2025, he released a statement to his supporters pledging to "fight alongside you to the very end to protect this nation". On 3 January, authorities tried to carry out the warrant at the presidential compound but abandoned the attempt after being physically blocked by the Presidential Security Service. After the warrant expired on 6 January, the Seoul Western District Court extended the warrant the next day.

On 15 January, Yoon was arrested by the police and the CIO. making him the first sitting South Korean president to be arrested. On 17 January, Yoon's criminal defense team petitioned the Seoul Central District Court for a habeas corpus review, but the court rejected it the next day. He was detained at the Seoul Detention Center in Uiwang, Gyeonggi Province, and was placed in solitary confinement. On 18 January, the Seoul Western District Court issued a formal arrest warrant on the grounds that Yoon posed a risk of destroying evidence, extending Yoon's detainment to 20 days pending the prosecutors' decision on indictment. On 26 January, Yoon was indicted on charges of being the "ringleader of an insurrection". On 7 March, the Seoul Central District Court canceled Yoon's arrest warrant, citing procedural flaws. He was released the next day.

On 10 July 2025, Yoon was arrested for the second time on additional charges brought by special counsel Cho Eun-suk.

==== Removal ====
On 4 April 2025, by a unanimous decision, an eight-judge Constitutional Court upheld Yoon's impeachment, formally removing him from office. This made him the shortest-serving elected president in South Korea's democratic history. An election to determine his successor was required to take place within 60 days following his removal. That election occurred on 3 June.

The Court removed Yoon from office on the basis of the following constitutional violations during his declaration of martial law:

- The substantive requirements for the declaration of emergency martial law had not been met
- Procedural requirements were violated by failing to convene a formal Cabinet meeting before declaring martial law
- Violated lawmakers' rights to deliberate and vote, immunity from arrest, and the freedom of political party activities
- Infringed the political neutrality of the military and the duty of the commander-in-chief under the Constitution
- Unauthorized search and seizure without a warrant at the National Election Commission and infringing its independence
- Violated constitutional provisions which granted the National Assembly the right to lift martial law
- Infringed Constitutional rights stipulating the political party system, representative democracy and the principle of the separation of powers
- Violated the provisions of the Constitution and Martial Law Act that states the requirements to restricting basic rights under martial law and the warrant requirement principle, people's basic political rights, right to collective action, freedom of occupation, etc.
- Violated the independence of the judiciary by tracking and making plans to arrest former judges

A week after the ruling, on 11 April, Yoon and his wife vacated their official residence and moved back to their personal accommodation at Acrovista in Gangnam, Seoul.

== Post-presidency (2025–present) ==
On 17 May 2025, Yoon left the People Power Party and endorsed its candidate, Kim Moon-soo, for the 2025 South Korean presidential election. On 21 May, he made his first public appearance without connection to his legal cases, attending the premiere in Seoul of a documentary on alleged electoral fraud in the 2024 parliamentary election. Yoon is serving his sentence at Seoul Detention Center and faces ongoing multiple criminal trials in relation to other charges from the martial law declaration and other scandals.

=== Insurrection trial ===
The trial of Yoon for insurrection charges began on 14 April 2025. Yoon denied the charges, saying his attempt to impose martial law did not amount to an insurrection. If found guilty, Yoon faced the death penalty or life imprisonment, although there has been a moratorium on executions in South Korea since the country's last execution in 1997. On 23 May, police announced the seizure of Yoon's phones as part of its investigations into Yoon's attempted arrest in January 2025.

On 6 July 2025, South Korean prosecutors filed a request to detain Yoon a day after he appeared before them for questioning over his declaration of martial law last year. He was formally arrested again on 10 July 2025 and indicted for abuse of power on 19 July. On 18 July 2025, the Seoul District Court denied Yoon's request to be released from prison, with the additional indictment then requiring him to remain in prison for up to six months. In September, the court publicly announced that the insurrection trial should conclude by the end of the year.

On 13 January 2026, the prosecution sought the death penalty for Yoon. On 16 January 2026, Yoon was convicted in a related trial and sentenced to five years' imprisonment on charges of abuse of power, obstruction of justice and falsification of official documents related to his failed martial law bid in 2024, subsequently increased to seven years after his lawyers appealed the sentence. On 19 February 2026, Yoon was convicted of leading an insurrection, and sentenced to life imprisonment.

On 9 July 2026, the Supreme Court finalised the obstruction of authorities and falsification of official documents charges sentencing him to seven years imprisonment. Yoon’s lawyers criticised the ruling as hasty and said they would seek constitutional remedies including a constitutional complaint to the Constitutional Court. However, on 20 July, Yoon’s lawyers said they won’t file a constitutional appeal due to Yoon’s opposition to challenging finalised court rulings.

=== Other investigations ===
On 30 April 2025, prosecutors conducted a court-approved raid on Yoon's private residence as part of an investigation into allegations of back-room deals and influence peddling involving an intermediary, Jeon Seong-bae, and Yoon's wife as well. This action marks the first time in South Korea's history that a former president's home was searched in connection with a corruption scandal. On 1 May, Yoon was indicted for abuse of power.

The Seoul Central District Court issued a fresh arrest warrant for former President Yoon Suk Yeol on 2 January 2026, extending his detention over allegations tied to drone deployments toward North Korea in October 2025. He also faces charges connected to his attempted imposition of martial law in December 2024. The detention order that was due to expire on 18 January 2026 was extended by up to six months. On 12 June 2026, Yoon was found guilty of treason and abuse of power for ordering drones to be flown into North Korea in October 2024 to drop propaganda leaflets on three occasions, to provoke North Korea and help justify his martial law declaration, and sentenced to 30 years imprisonment.

On 13 July 2026, Yoon was sentenced to two years imprisonment by a Seoul court for accepting free opinion polls in exchange for political support. However, on 7 October 2026, an appellate court acquitted Yoon in the free opinion polls case.

== Political positions ==
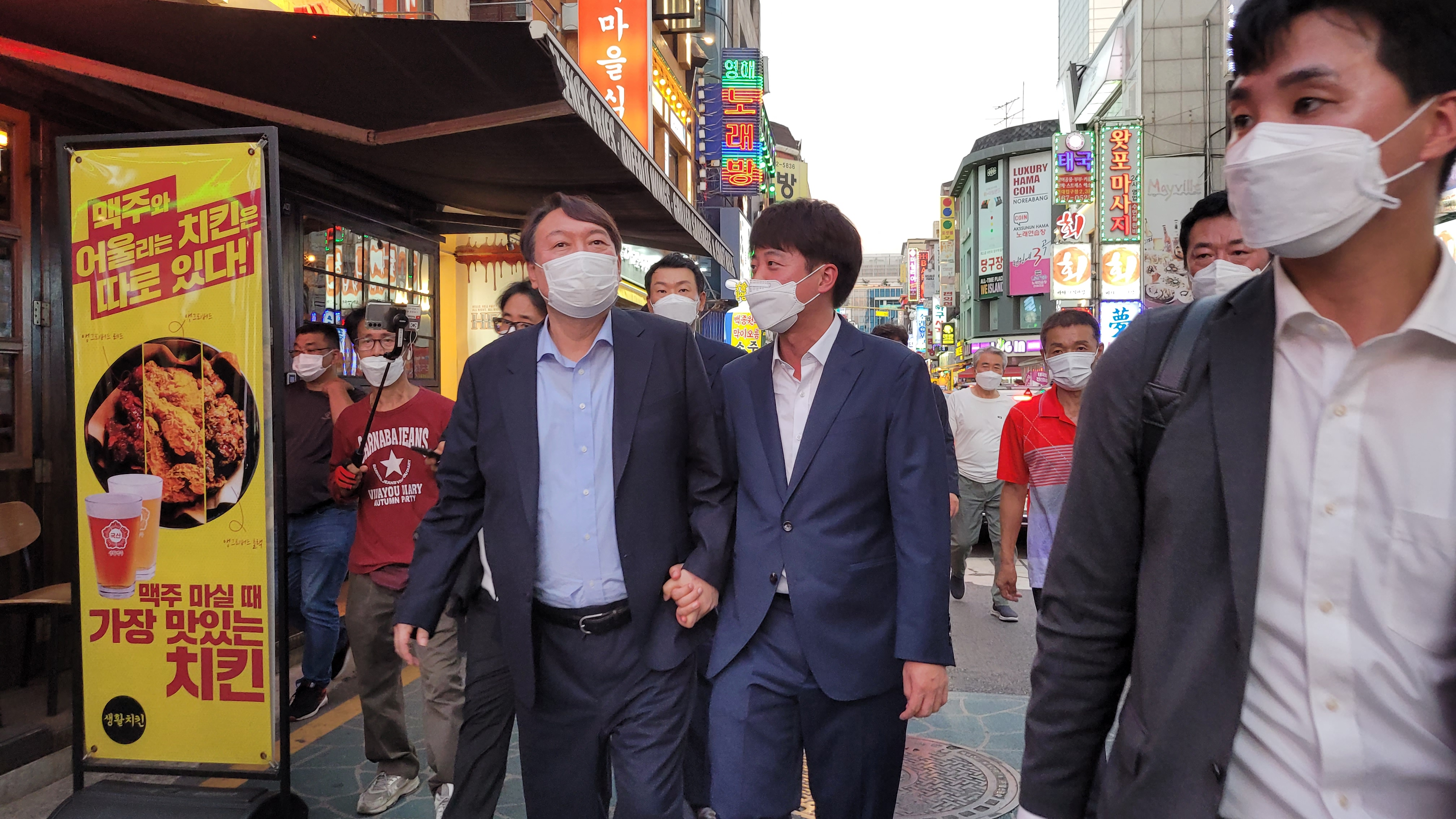
Yoon Suk Yeol (left) with PPP party leader Lee Jun-seok (right)

Yoon identifies as a "conservative". Chung Doo-un, a former conservative member of parliament, has considered Yoon a conservative. Political commentator Chin Jung-kwon called his political inclination "libertarianism" (자유지상주의). He has also been described as a social conservative. His critical attitude toward feminism, his nationalist nature, and his hostile attitude toward the opposition and the liberal media have led the media and experts to call him and his policies "K-Trumpism" (한국판 트럼프 or K-트럼프) and "far-right" (극우), allegations denied by him and his supporters.

=== Economics ===
Yoon opposes economic interventionism by the government and is generally regarded as pro-business, and as a fiscal conservative. He has cited economist Milton Friedman and his 1980 book Free to Choose as a major influence on his belief in economic liberalism. According to the Center for Strategic and International Studies, Yoon has intended to reduce dependence on China and promote supply chain resilience.

=== Military ===
Yoon has expressed active support for the possibility of South Korea having indigenous nuclear weapons. The Carnegie Endowment for International Peace referred to his policy as "nuclear populism." Some research shows that nationalist attitudes and anti-American sentiment are prevalent among supporters of an indigenous nuclear arsenal.

On 22 September 2021, Yoon stated that he would ask that the United States redeploy tactical nuclear weapons in South Korea if there is a threat from North Korea. Nuclear weapons have not been deployed by the U.S. in South Korea since the early 1990s after an agreement with Russia and in an effort to ease tensions between North and South Korea. Speaking for the United States, U.S. Deputy Assistant Secretary of State for Japan and Korea Mark Lambert rejected Yoon's call for the re-nuclearization of South Korea and said the proposal was against U.S. policy.

On 12 November 2021, Yoon indicated that he would be open to more U.S. THAAD missile deployments in South Korea.

== Electoral history ==
2022 South Korean presidential election—People Power Party primary
Party	Candidate	Votes	%
People Power	Yoon Suk Yeol	347,963	47.85
People Power	Hong Joon-pyo	301,786	41.50
People Power	Yoo Seong-min	54,304	7.47
People Power	Won Hee-ryong	23,085	3.17
Total votes		727,138	100.00

2022 South Korean presidential election
Party	Candidate	Votes	%
People Power	Yoon Suk Yeol	16,394,815	48.56
Democratic	Lee Jae Myung	16,147,738	47.83
Justice	Sim Sang-jung	803,358	2.38
National Revolutionary	Huh Kyung-young	281,481	0.83
Progressive	Kim Jae-yeon	37,366	0.11
Our Republican	Cho Won-jin	25,972	0.08
Basic Income	Oh Jun-ho	18,105	0.05
Korean Wave Alliance	Kim Min-chan	17,305	0.05
Korean Unification	Lee Gyeong-hee	11,708	0.03
Labor	Lee Baek-yun	9,176	0.03
New Liberal Democratic Union	Kim Gyeong-jae	8,317	0.02
Saenuri	Ok Un-ho	4,970	0.01
Total votes		33,760,311	100.00
People Power gain from Democratic			

== Personal life ==
Yoon has been married to Kim Keon Hee since 2012. His wife said that she prefers the term "president's spouse" instead of "first lady".

Kim is the president of Covana Contents, a company that focuses on art exhibitions. Kim has faced an investigation that alleged she had taken kickbacks for hosting art exhibitions, in addition to reports that circulated in the South Korean media that she inflated her resume with connections to New York University Stern School of Business. She responded by offering a public apology. Kim was arrested on 12 August 2025 after the Seoul Central District Court granted a special prosecutor's request for an arrest warrant amid serious corruption allegations.

Yoon is the fourth South Korean president who is a Catholic, after Moon Jae-in, Roh Moo-hyun (a lapsed Catholic), and Kim Dae-jung. He was baptized with the Christian name "Ambrose". Yoon and his wife were accused of having a close relationship with Korean shamans who allegedly advised them on administrative decisions.

Yoon is known to keep multiple pets, which increased from four dogs and three cats in 2022 to six dogs and five cats in 2025. It was also under his presidency that a law outlawing the trade and consumption of dog meat in South Korea was passed in 2024.

== Honors ==
Country	Date	Honors	Ribbon	Reference
Netherlands	12 December 2023	Knight Grand Cross of the Order of the Netherlands Lion		
United Kingdom	21 November 2023	Honorary Knight Grand Cross (Civil Division) of the Most Honourable Order of the Bath (GCB)		
Italy	7 October 2023	Knight Grand Cross with Collar of the Order of Merit of the Italian Republic (OMRI)		
Peru	17 November 2024	Grand Collar of the Order of the Sun of Peru		
Poland	13 July 2023	Knight of the Order of the White Eagle (Poland)		

== Notes ==
Legal offices
Preceded by Mun Mu-il	Prosecutor General of South Korea; 25 July 2019 – 4 March 2021	Succeeded by Kim Oh-soo
Party political offices
Preceded by Hong Joon-pyo	People Power Party nominee for President of South Korea; 2022	Succeeded by Kim Moon-soo
Political offices
Preceded by Moon Jae-in	President of South Korea; 10 May 2022 – 4 April 2025 (Powers and duties suspended) 14 December 2024 – 4 April 2025	Succeeded by Han Duck-soo (Acting); Choi Sang-mok (Acting); Han Duck-soo (Acting); Lee Ju-ho (Acting); Lee Jae Myung
