= Mun Mu-il =

South Korean lawyer

- 문무일

Prosecutor General of South Korea
- In office 25 July 2017 – 25 July 2019
- Preceded by: Kim Soo-nam
- Succeeded by: Yoon Suk Yeol

Personal details
- Born: Mun Mu-il; 16 July 1961 Gwangju, South Korea
- Spouse: Choi Jun-yoon
- Children: 3 daughters

Mun Mu-il (Korean: 문무일; born on 16 July 1961), is a South Korean lawyer who served as the 42nd prosecutor general of South Korea from 2017 to 2019.

== Biography ==
Mun Mu-il was born in Gwangju on 16 July 1961. He graduated from Gwangju Mujin Middle School, Gwangju Jeil High School, and Korea University Law School, and passed the 28th Bar Examination in 1986.

He is a member of the 18th class of the Judicial Research and Training Institute and served as Deputy Chief Prosecutor of Gwangju High Prosecutors' Office, Director of the Crime Prevention Policy Bureau of the Ministry of Justice, Chief Prosecutor of Seoul Western District Prosecutors' Office, and Chief Prosecutor of Daejeon District Prosecutors' Office.

He participated in special case investigations, including the investigation into corruption of former President Roh Moo-hyun's associates, the investigation into the suspicion of Hyosung's slush fund creation, the Sung Wan-jong Chairman case, and the 'peanut return' case of former Korean Air Vice President Cho Hyun-ah.

During the investigation of Gyeongnam Enterprise regarding the resource diplomacy corruption of the Lee Myung-bak administration, Gyeongnam Enterprise Chairman Sung Wan-jong committed suicide, and a note found with Chairman Sung's body contained suspicious content regarding the provision of bribes to eight politicians and high-ranking public officials, including Prime Minister Lee Wan-koo and Gyeongnam Province Governor Hong Joon-pyo. Accordingly, he was appointed the head of the special investigation team by Prosecutor General Kim Soo-nam.

In December 2015, Mun became the prosecutor of the Busan High Prosecutors' Office and was appointed the prosecutor general by the Moon Jae-in government in July 2017.

In May 2019, the prosecution's right to investigate the agenda was designated as a fast track agenda in the National Assembly. Mr. Moon said, "The laws designated as a fast track are contrary to the principle of democracy of check and balance."

He returned to South Korea on the 4th and stated his position, saying, “I am well aware that there are contemporary criticisms of the prosecution’s past work practices. I also agree that changes are needed in the way the work is done.” He added, “Under no circumstances should there be any loopholes in the protection of the people’s basic rights,” and “There should be no confusion in the exercise of the state’s investigative powers.”

It has been reported that the Korean Association of Criminal Procedure Law will also express an opposing opinion regarding the adjustment of the prosecution and police investigation authority. The Association of Criminal Procedure Law holds similar opinions to Prosecutor General Mun Mu-il stating that, the procedural legitimacy of the National Assembly's discussion is not guaranteed, the police's exercise of the right to conclude the primary investigation could pose a serious threat to the people's basic rights, and the plan to adjust the investigation authority does not include measures to secure the political neutrality of the prosecution and control abuse of the investigation authority.
