= Saudi Arabia–South Korea relations =

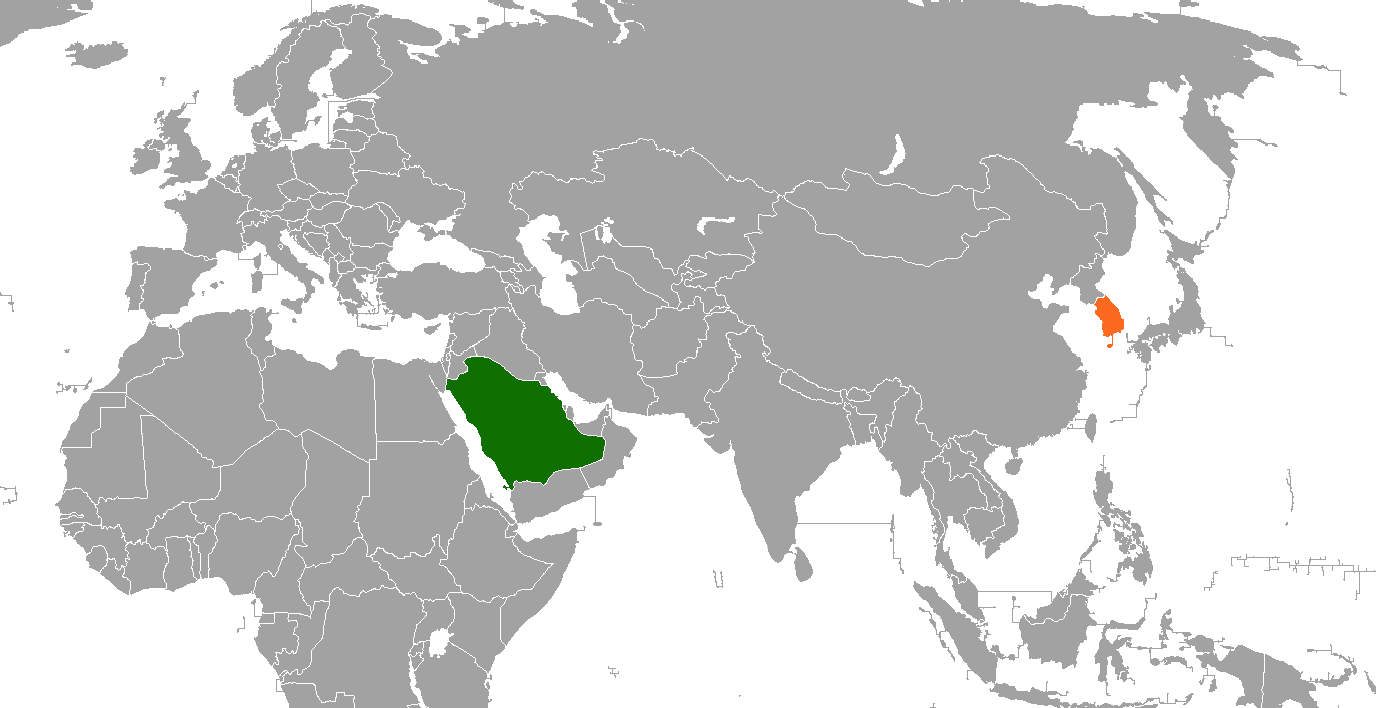
- South Korea: Saudi Arabia

Diplomatic mission
- Embassy of South Korea, Riyadh: Embassy of Saudi Arabia, Seoul

Envoy
- Sami Alsadhan: Choi Byung-hyuk

Saudi Arabia–South Korea relations are the official bilateral relations between Saudi Arabia and South Korea. Saudi Arabia provides its embassy in Seoul, and South Korea has its counterpart in Riyadh.

== Ancient relations ==
The link between South Korea and Saudi Arabia have been historically strong from the old era when Arab merchants came to the Korean Kingdom United Silla in 7th and 8th century. This has resulted in the growth of trades between Korea and the Arab world despite regime changes on both sides.

During the Goryeo era, an Arab-Turkic clan, the Deoksu Jang clan, came to service in Korea, where Jang Sun-ryong, a Muslim of Arab origin, came to represent the Goryeo court. The Deoksu Jang clan survived and integrated within the Korean society, but its descendants could no longer speak Arabic language nor even practising Islam anymore.

During the Joseon rule, Sejong the Great in his annals had mentioned Arabs reading Quran and Islamic teachings, though the King was never a Muslim throughout his life.

== Modern relations ==
During the Korean War, Saudi Arabia, as part of the Western alliance against communist expansion by the Soviet Union, sided with the infant South Korea from 1950 to 1953, though they didn't contribute soldiers. Saudi Arabia and South Korea had also commonly experienced economic booms in the 1970s and 1980s, where two nations supported each other; now South Korean investors are among the most important investors in Saudi Arabia. In 1977, South Korean migrants to Saudi Arabia composed nearly one-fifth of all registered emigration from South Korea, making it the third-most popular destination for emigrants. South Korean labor and engineering expertise were critical in the development of Saudi infrastructure, including highways, electrical systems, and port facilities as the country's petroleum-based economy grew rapidly during this time.

As such, the relationship between Saudi Arabia and South Korea have been largely cordial and the two countries are economic and strategic partners.

When Saudi Arabia announced Saudi Vision 2030, South Korea and Saudi Arabia have increased their cooperation, as the two nations do not have any hostilities and both are concerned over security and safety. The two countries signed $8.3bn economic pact, included a $6bn deal between Saudi Aramco and Korean firm S-Oil in 2019. Trade has also been expanded since 2018.

Saudi Arabia is also the largest exporter of Crude Petroleum to South Korea, with more than a third of South Korean crude imports coming from Saudi Arabia. In 2022, South Korean crude imports from Saudi Arabia reached nearly $33B.

== Military cooperation ==
Like North Korea, South Korea's neighbor in the north has a strong relationship with Saudi Arabia's rival Iran, Saudi Arabia's alliance with South Korea becomes vital in countering Iranian–North Korean axis. South Korea provided Saudi Arabia's intelligence about North Korea's activities in the Middle East, most notably during the 2014 Yemeni conflict.

In June 2019, Saudi Arabia and South Korea signed an arms manufacture deal, where Saudi Arabia and South Korea's military companies would cooperate together against external threats and co-joint manufacturing weapons and vehicles, as well as improving military technologies in both nations.

On February 2, 2024, South Korea and Saudi Arabia signed a memorandum of understanding to expand defence cooperation, Seoul's Defense Acquisition Program Administration (DAPA) said, as Seoul looked to ink further arms sales in the region. The agreement saw the two establish a joint committee to form a working group for weapons systems research and development as well as production to continue cooperation in defence.

== See also ==
- Deoksu Jang clan, the only Arab-based clan in Korea
- Koreans in the Arab world
