= Freedom of the press in South Korea =

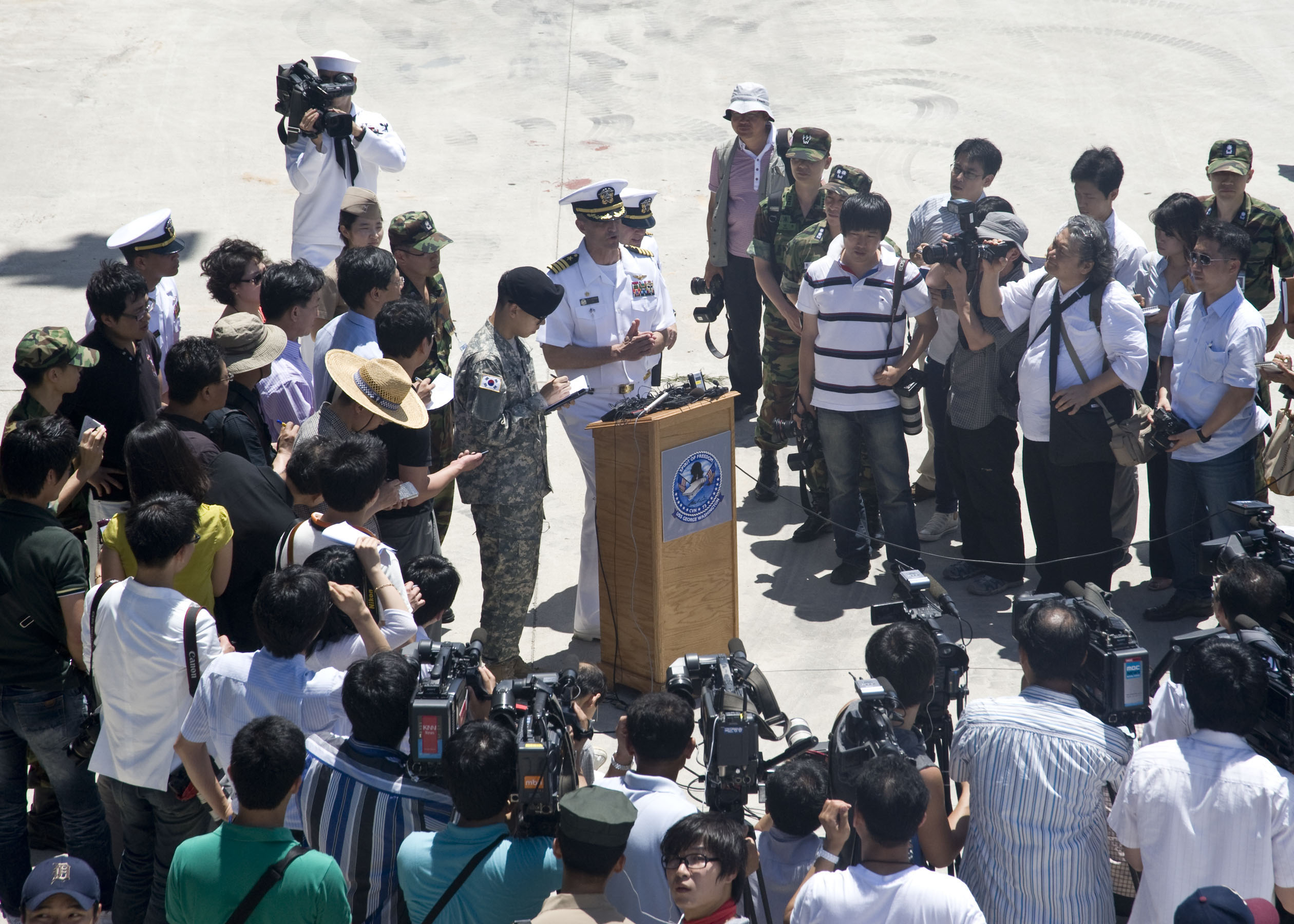
A group of South Korean journalists aboard the USS George Washington after its arrival in Busan, Republic of Korea

South Korea is considered to have freedom of the press, but it is subject to several pressures. It has improved since South Korea transitioned to democracy in the late 20th century, but declined slightly in the 2010s. Freedom House Freedom of the Press has classified South Korean press as free from 2002 to 2010, and as partly free since 2011.

In the Index of Reporters Without Borders, the government of President Park Geun-hye fell to 70th in 2016, but it rose 20 places in the government of Moon Jae-in. For this reason, Freedom House published the Freedom of the Press Index in Korea for the first time among Asian countries.

== History ==
The Western concept of freedom of the press was introduced to Korea following World War II by the United States Army Military Government in Korea, though some communist press outlets were censored. The Syngman Rhee administration that followed afforded considerable press freedom, but this was limited in its later tenure by the National Security Act. The Rhee administration closed one newspaper critical of it, the Kyunghyang Shinmun. After Rhee was replaced in 1960 by the short-lived Chang Myon administration, the South Korean press was freed from most restrictions, but Chang was soon replaced in a military coup led by General Park Chung Hee in 1961. Park was highly critical of the press' ability to criticize the government, and Youm and Salwen (1990) note that he "invoked a series of emergency decrees to muzzle the press".

Following Park's assassination, as happened before, the Korean press regained some freedoms during the early stages of the new administration, until another military dictator, Chun Doo Hwan, reimposed military control, with what Youm and Salwen described as "an unprecedented 'purification campaign' against the press". Media were regulated through the Basic Press Act of 1980. That law was replaced in 1989 by the more liberal Act on Registration of Periodicals and the Broadcast Act by the Roh Tae-Woo administration, which is widely credited with transitioning South Korea to a democratic society respecting freedom of press, with Korean media becoming much freer from state control. A landmark case occurred in 1988 when a military court ruled against military officers accused of assaulting a newspaper editor who published a negative story about the Korean military.

== Present situation and international rankings ==
Freedom House Freedom of the Press report for 2015 described the freedom of the press in South Korea as "threatened". It attributed the main problems to the administration of President Park Geun-hye "increased reliance" on the National Security Law which had "a chilling effect on working journalists". It scored South Korea for 2015 and 2016 as 33 out of 100 (0 being best), placing it in the 'Partly Free' category. Freedom House has downgraded South Korea ranking from free to partly free in 2010 (the 2010 ranking listed South Korea as free, while 2011, as partly free). The 2011 report noted:

South Korea declined from Free to Partly Free to reflect an increase in official censorship, particularly of online content, as well as the government's attempt to influence media outlets' news and information content

The report also criticized the Lee Myung-bak administration for interfering with the press.

Jaggard and You (2015) identified five factors contributing to deterioration of South Korea's Freedom House rating in 2010s: "abuse of criminal defamation, the rules governing election campaigns, national security limitations on free speech, restrictions related to the internet and partisan use of state power to control the media".

Freedom of the Press Index (Freedom House) for South Korea, 2002–2016

Year	Ranking
2002	30
2003	29
2004	29
2005	29
2006	30
2007	30
2008	30
2009	30
2010	30
2011	32
2012	32
2013	31
2014	32
2015	33
2016	33

Likewise, the Press Freedom Index published by Reporters Without Borders has noted decline of freedom of the press in Korea over the past several years. For 2016, South Korea has slipped to position 70 out of 181 countries, with the rating declining since 2010, when it had the position 42 out of 172. The PFI entry on South Korea for 2016 stated:

Relations have been very tense between the media and the authorities under President Park Geun-hye. The government has displayed a growing inability to tolerate criticism and its meddling in the already polarized media threatens their independence. A defamation law providing for sentences of up to seven years in prison is the main reason for self-censorship in the media. The public debate about relations with North Korea, one of the main national issues, is hampered by a national security law under which any article or broadcast "favourable" to North Korea is punishable by imprisonment. This is one of the main grounds for online censorship.

Press Freedom Index (Reporters Without Borders) for South Korea, 2002–2016

Year	Ranking
2002	39 / 134
2003	49 / 158
2004	48 / 157
2005	34 / 160
2006	31 / 160
2007	39 / 163
2008	47 / 167
2009	69 / 169
2010	42 / 172
2011	N/A
2012	50 / 177
2013	50 / 177
2014	57 / 179
2015	60 / 179
2016	70 / 181
2017	63 / 181
2018	43 / 181
2019	41 / 181
2020	42 / 181
2021	42 / 181
2022	43 / 181

== See also ==
- Censorship in South Korea
- Media of South Korea
- Minerva (Internet celebrity)
- Tatsuya Kato (journalist)
