= OpenNet (organization) =

Open Net
- 오픈넷
- Formation: February 4, 2013; 13 years ago
- Type: NGO
- Purpose: Focus on freedom, openness, and sharing on internet of South Korea.
- Headquarters: Gangnam, Seoul
- Location: Seoul
- Region served: South Korea
- Official language: Korean
- Key people: Kim Keechang(Korean: 김기창), Park Kyung-sin (Korean: 박경신), Nam Heesob(Korean: 남희섭), Jeon Eung-hui (Korean: 전응휘), Woo Jisuk(Korean: 우지숙), Kang Jung Soo(Korean: 강정수), Kim Borami (Korean: 김보라미)
- Main organ: board of directors
- Staff: 3
- Website: http://opennet.or.kr, opennetkorea.org

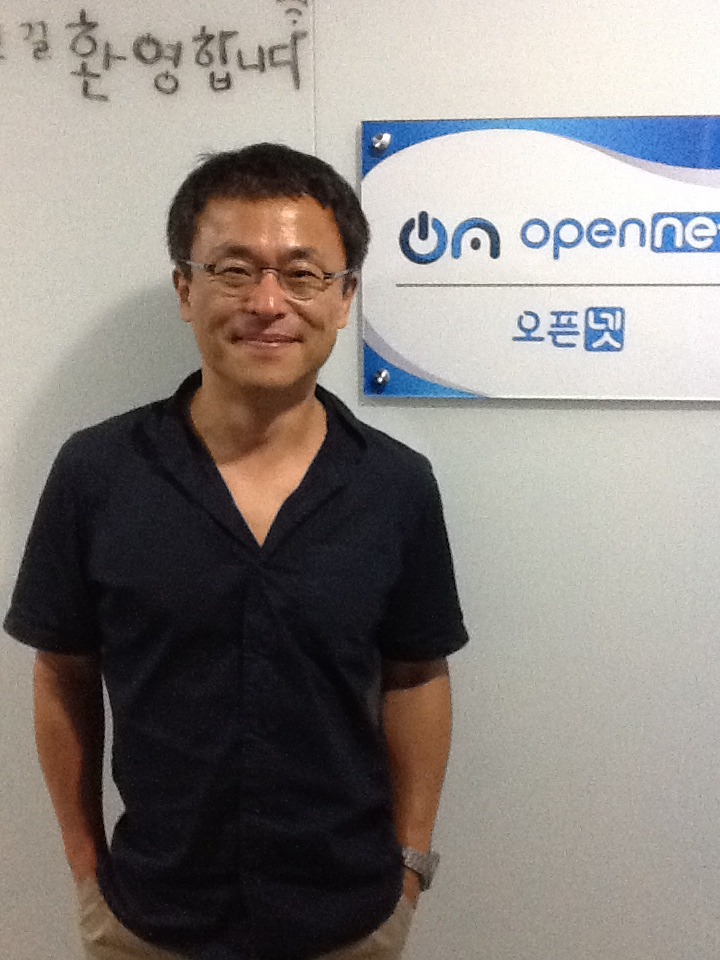
Kim Keechang, one of Founders in 2013

Open Net (Korean: 오픈넷) is a non-governmental organization which aims for the freedom and openness of South Korea's internet. It was approved by Seoul Radiowave Management Office (Korean: 서울전파관리소) on 7 March 2013.

== Activities ==
Open Net works on major projects grouped under the banners such as "Freedom of Speech", "Intellectual Property", "Privacy", "Network neutrality", "Open Government", and "Innovation and Regulations".

On July 31, 2013, Open Net submitted a Constitutional complaint about how the South Korean government forces minors to verify his or her identity. In August 2013, Open Net and Aladdin Communications started a non-Active X payment system, however, card companies refused to accept. Open Net submitted a preliminary injunction to accept it. On January 28, 2014, OpenNet filed a lawsuit against the Korea Communications Standards Commission's (Korean: 대한민국 방송통신심의위원회) internet censorship by blocking access to Grooveshark. On 17 January 2014, OpenNet accepts donations via Bitcoin. OpenNet is the first Korean NGO who accepts Bitcoin donation.

== See also ==
- Internet censorship in South Korea
