= Tatsuya Kato (journalist) =

Japanese journalist

- Born: 1966 (age 59–60)
- Occupation: Journalist
- Known for: Seoul Bureau chief of South Korea at Sankei Shimbun

Tatsuya Kato (加藤 達也, Katō Tatsuya, born 1966) is a Japanese journalist who was a Seoul bureau chief of South Korea at Sankei Shimbun.

He was indicted in October 2014 on charges of defamation for reporting the relationship of President Park Geun-hye and Choi Soon-sil's husband, Chung Yoon-hoi, by the Supreme Prosecutors' Office of the Republic of Korea after the MV Sewol sank. He was acquitted in December 2015 in what has been described as a small victory for freedom of the press in South Korea.

== See also ==
- Censorship in South Korea
- Freedom of the press in South Korea
