= 2024 South Korea–Africa Summit =

- Host country: South Korea
- Date: 4–5 June 2024
- Motto: The Future We Make Together
- Cities: Ilsan and Seoul
- Participants: South Korea and 48 African Union member states
- Website: 2024rokasummit.kr

The 2024 South Korea–Africa Summit was the inaugural summit hosted by the government of South Korea with 48 African countries.

== Background ==
Africa is a huge consumer market with a population of 1.4 billion and a GDP of $3.4 trillion, but South Korea's trade with Africa accounts for only 1.9% of total trade. South Korea has plans to further strengthen economic cooperation with Africa.

== Agreement ==
South Korea and Tanzania announced the start of Economic Partnership Agreement (EPA) negotiations to deepen trade relations. In addition, to promote trade and investment, the Trade and Investment Promotion Framework was signed with eight African countries, including Ghana, Malawi, and Zimbabwe. Additionally, South Korea signed separate agreements on key minerals with Tanzania and Madagascar.

"The partnership between South Korea and Africa is a tell-tale example of how global citizens, despite different backgrounds, can get together to achieve the goal of joint prosperity."

— Ahn Duk-geun, Minister of Trade, Industry and Energy

== Participating countries ==
The summit was attended by delegations from 48 African countries, including 25 heads of state.

Country	Title	Dignitary
African Union	Chair	Moussa Faki
Botswana	President	Mokgweetsi Masisi
Cameroon	Minister of Foreign Affairs	Lejeune Mbella Mbella
Cape Verde	President	José Maria Pereira Neves
Central African Republic	President	Faustin-Archange Touadéra
Chad	Minister of Justice	Mahamat Ahmat Alhabo
Comoros	President	Azali Assoumani
Djibouti	Prime Minister	Abdoulkader Kamil Mohamed
Egypt	Minister of International Cooperation	Rania Al-Mashat
Eritrea	President	Isaias Afwerki
Eswatini	King	Mswati III
Ethiopia	Prime Minister	Abiy Ahmed Ali
Ghana	Minister for Foreign Affairs and Regional Integration	Shirley Ayorkor Botchwey
Guinea-Bissau	President	Umaro Sissoco Embaló
Ivory Coast	President	Alassane Ouattara
Kenya	President	William Ruto
Lesotho	Prime Minister	Sam Matekane
Liberia	President	Joseph Boakai
Madagascar	President	Andry Nirina Rajoelina
Malawi	Minister of Foreign Affairs	Nancy Tembo
Mauritania	President	Mohamed Ould Cheikh El Ghazouani
Mauritius	President	Prithvirajsing Roopun
Morocco	Minister of Foreign Affairs	Nasser Bourita
Mozambique	President	Filipe Nyusi
Namibia	Minister of International Relations and Cooperation	Peya Mushelenga
Nigeria	Minister of Foreign Affairs	Yusuf Tuggar
Rwanda	President	Paul Kagame
São Tomé and Príncipe	President	Carlos Vila Nova
Senegal	Minister of Foreign Affairs	Yassine Fall
Seychelles	President	Wavel Ramkalawan
Sierra Leone	President	Julius Maada Bio
South Korea	President	Yoon Suk Yeol
Tanzania	President	Samia Suluhu Hassan
Togo	President	Faure Essozimna Gnassingbé
Tunisia	Minister of Foreign Affairs	Nabil Ammar
Zambia	Minister of Foreign Affairs	Mulambo Haimbe
Zimbabwe	President	Emmerson Mnangagwa
