= Yoon Ki Joong =

South Korean economist (1931–2023)

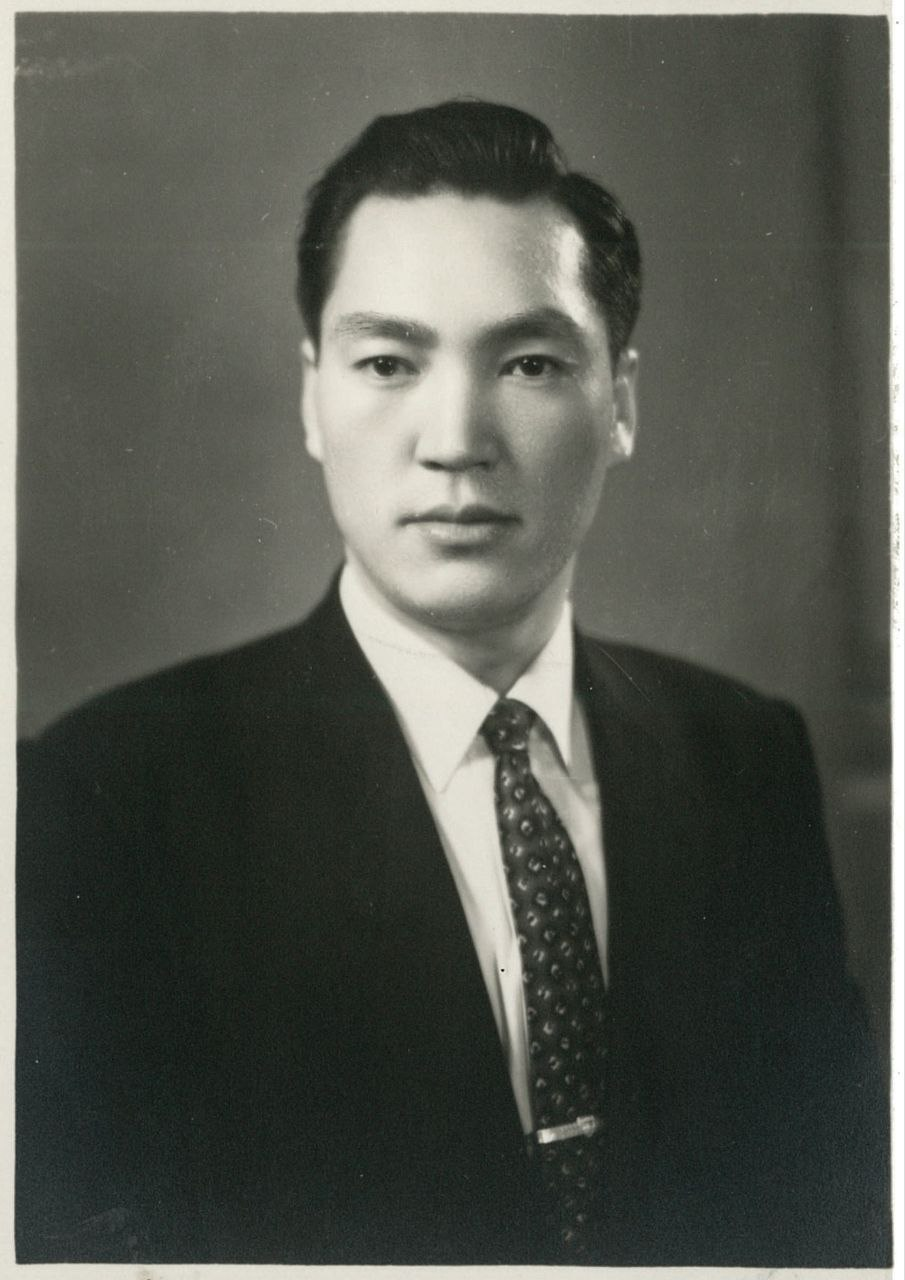
- Born: 19 December 1931; Korea, Empire of Japan
- Died: 15 August 2023 (aged 91); Seoul, South Korea
- Education: Yonsei University (BEc, MEc); Hitotsubashi University
- Occupation: Economist
- Years active: 1958–1997
- Spouse: Choi Seong-ja
- Children: 2, including Yoon
- Family: Kim Keon Hee (daughter-in-law)

Korean name
- Hangul: 윤기중
- Hanja: 尹起重
- RR: Yun Gijung
- MR: Yun Kijung

Yoon Ki Joong (Korean: 윤기중; 19 December 1931 – 15 August 2023) was a South Korean economist. He was the father of former South Korean president Yoon Suk Yeol.

== Early life and education ==
Yoon was born on 19 December 1931.

His lineage traced back to Yun Sindal (윤신달), a founding contributor of the Goryeo Dynasty. Born as the 34th-generation descendant from the progenitor, he was the son of Yun Hobyŏng (윤호병).

Yoon Ki Joong graduated from Gongju Agricultural High School and subsequently from the Department of Economics at Yonsei University.

== Career ==
In 1958, he completed his postgraduate studies at Yonsei University's Graduate School. He studied at one of the top universities, Hitotsubashi University (Tokyo University Commerce) and was a professor at Yonsei University. From 1958 to 1997, he served as a professor at both Hanyang University and Yonsei University. Until 1997, he held positions as a professor of Applied Statistics at Yonsei University, as well as the presidency of the Korean Statistical Society and the Korean Economic Association.
