= Censorship in South Korea =

Censorship in South Korea is implemented by various laws that were included in the constitution as well as acts passed by the National Assembly over the decades since 1948. These include the National Security Act, whereby the government may limit the expression of ideas that it perceives "praise or incite the activities of anti-state individuals or groups". Censorship was particularly severe during the country's authoritarian era, with freedom of expression being non-existent, which lasted from 1948 to 1993.

However, ever since the inauguration of president Lee Myung-bak in 2008, South Korea has experienced a noticeable decline in freedom of expression for both journalists and the general public. South Korea's status beginning in the 2011 Freedom of the Press report from Freedom House has declined from "Free" to "Partly Free", a status that has continued to the present, reflecting an increase in official censorship and government attempts to influence news and information content.

During the presidency of Moon Jae-in, his administration further reinforced media censorship by snooping on SNI traffic. His party also passed a law meant to control the narrative of historical topics during the country's military authoritarian era such as the Gwangju Massacre, topics related to the comfort women issue, as well as events that negatively implicates the government such as the sinking of MV Sewol.

The South Korean government has control in censorship over all media capable of reaching a wide audience. This includes television, print media, radio, film, theater, text messaging, instant messaging, video games, literature, and the Internet. The South Korean government asserts that it has the legal right to control the Internet's content within their territory and that their censorship rules do not infringe on their citizens' right to free speech. For example, the country bans pornography, and there exists a "cyber defamation law" which allows the authorities to crack down on comments deemed "hateful" without any reports from victims, with citizens being sentenced for such offenses.

== National Security Act ==
South Korea's government has had a hand in censorship of media within the country since it adopted the National Security Act in 1948. The law gave the government broad control over media in order to prevent any information deemed to be a threat to the government from dissemination to the public at large. The newly established Republic of Korea government created the law in response to widespread unrest due to conflict between the right-wing anti-communist government and the people and far-left People's Committee.

Originally, the law was enacted in opposition to specific North Korean forces, but it was later expanded to encapsulate any "anti-state" group seen as against the views of the government. Importantly, the law allows the government to punish anyone who would "praise, encourage, disseminate or cooperate" with the efforts of a group deemed to be "anti-state" with up to 7 years in prison. In addition, directly working with one of these groups results in a minimum jail sentence of one year.

The law is still enforced even after South Korea underwent democratization during the 1990s. Amnesty International reported that 90 people were charged under the law in 2011, with some leading to imprisonment, a sharp increase by 95.6% between 2008 and 2011. It described the National Security Act as a tool to "harass and arbitrarily prosecute individuals and civil society organizations who are peacefully exercising their rights to freedom of expression, opinion and association." and to "remove people who are perceived to threaten established political views, to prevent people from taking part in discussions surrounding relations with North Korea."

== History ==
=== Authoritarian era ===
==== Park Chung Hee regime (1961–1979) ====
After Park Chung Hee's military coup and subsequent rise to power in 1961, his regime invalidated the Constitution as well as the democratically elected legislature. Park used the implied threat of the Democratic People's Republic of Korea to imprison and torture political enemies. His regime targeted artists and politicians alike, jailing leaders who would later hold the office as president as well as writers such as Kim Chi-ha. In 1975, Park's regime banned various music, citing "decadent" foreign influences. The ban included many American protest songs, folk ballads, and rock music.

In addition, the Park regime ran a large campaign of film censorship. Scripts required approval by censor committees, and several viewings of the final version of the film were required to ensure that it represented the previously approved script. Eliminating themes of rebellion, protest were the main focus of the censors. The censors also targeted any accurate depiction of the political or socio-economic climate.

==== Chun Doo-hwan regime (1980–1988) ====
After Chun Doo-hwan assumed power in another military coup, he too declared martial law in response to widespread uprisings among the country's students. He also took aim at South Korea's press, systematically sacking 937 members of the press while nationalizing the country's media outlets. Due to foreign and domestic condemnation of Chun's policies and actions, a new Constitution was formed which guaranteed the freedom to organize into opposition parties. Although the political climate liberalized slightly with the new Constitution, the regime continued to target perceived threats from North Korea with the powers granted by the National Security Law.

==== Roh Tae-woo regime (1988–1993) ====
During the early presidency of Roh Tae-woo, student uprisings continued in the face of apparent attempts by Roh to consolidate the new regime and extend his presidential term past the constitutional limit. The protests specifically targeted the government's use of the National Security Act under the pretenses of curtailing North Korean influence in South Korean media.

== Sixth Republic Era (1993–present) ==
The dawn of the nineties brought about movements pushing for greater democracy and unification efforts for the Korean peninsula. These forces sought to abolish the use of the National Security Law. However, in the wake of the 1997 Asian financial crisis, student and worker protests were suppressed under the auspices of the National Security Law.

In 2019, Korean Ministry of Gender Equality and Family proposed strict guidelines on K-pop stars, essentially censoring most content deemed "unhealthy" by them, only to be met with strong opposition among fans of the genre. The proposal was eventually withdrawn. In 2021, President Moon Jae-in's party introduced a law to control the narrative of historical topics, such as the Gwangju massacre, Japan's colonial rule of Korea, the comfort women, and the sinking of MV Sewol. Free speech advocates see this law as a means for the President to use censorship and history as political weapons.

According to 'A history of internet censorship in South Korea' by South Korean VPN experts NetxHack.com, the roots of censorship in South Korea can be traced back to the country's history of division after World War II, and the complexities of politics, Protestant politicians, and the country's educational culture.

== Subject matter and agenda ==
=== Press freedom and criminal defamation ===
There is an active independent media that expresses a wide variety of views, de jure generally without restriction. However, under the National Security Law, the government may limit the expression at any given time of ideas that may "praise" or "incite" the "activities of antistate individuals or groups". The law also forbids citizens from reading any books published in North Korea.

In a 2011 report, the UN special rapporteur on the promotion and protection of the right to freedom of opinion expressed concern about increased restrictions on freedom of expression in South Korea, citing laws that made defamation a crime and could ban books and control the dissemination of election or candidate information. The rapporteur described the laws as "inherently harsh and [having a] disproportionate chilling effect".

Chapter XXXIII of South Korea's penal code outlines various crimes against reputation, which include criminal defamation. Unlike most defamation laws, South Korea's defamation does not recognize truth as an absolute defense against defamation. Instead, defendants must prove that their statements were made "solely for the public interest" to invoke truth as a valid defense. In October 2007, the Supreme Court ruled that disclosing someone's LGBT identity without their consent constitutes criminal defamation if the disclosure harms the individual's reputation. Politicians across the political spectrum have used criminal defamation laws against critics, whether or not their intent was to suppress dissent or unfavorable news coverage, though such actions have drawn criticism of often have a chilling effect. In 2014, President Park Geun-hye sued Japanese journalist Tatsuya Kato for defamation; Kato had published an online article containing rumors that President Park was having a romantic encounter with an aide at the time of the Sewol ferry disaster. In 2019, President Moon Jae-in pressed criminal defamation charges against an individual who had disseminated leaflets accusing Moon of being "a dog of North Korea". Moon dropped the charges in 2021. In 2022, former president Moon sued a far-right activist, Ahn Jeong-kweon, accusing him of "insulting the Moon couple by swearing viciously 48 times using a loudspeaker during a total of seven protest rallies in May outside their private residence in Yangsan, 309 kilometers southeast of Seoul."

=== Pornography ===
South Korea is one of the few countries that explicitly prohibits any form of pornography. Pornographic websites, books, writings, films, magazines, photographs or other materials of a pornographic nature are illegal in South Korea. Distribution of pornography is a felony, and can result in a fine or a prison sentence not exceeding one year. Since 2009, pornographic websites have been blocked by the South Korean government. In 2012, the Ministry of Public Administration and Security released statistics that cited 39.5% of South Korean children having experienced watching online pornography, with 14.2% of those who have viewed online pornography reportedly "wanting to imitate" it. In 2019, the Korea Communications Standards Commission began blocking banned websites based on filtering of Server Name Indication. The KCC said their focus was "on blocking sites with child pornography, illegal films and gambling."

=== Public libraries ===
South Korea's public libraries censor a plethora of subjects in their libraries - both online and in their physical collections. Examples of censored topics include: sexuality (including educational information about the subject), homosexuality, information about North Korea, violence, anti-government materials, and political discourse.

The public libraries of South Korea also censor information via discriminating against who can use the library's public meeting spaces. If a person or group wants to use the space to meet to discuss any of the forbidden topics listed above, they are refused.

=== Military ===
The Constitutional Court of Korea upheld the Ministry of National Defense's order to allow the banning of certain books such as Ha-Joon Chang's Bad Samaritans and Hans-Peter Martin's The Global Trap from soldiers' hands in October 2010, despite a petition made by a group of military judicial officers protesting against the order in 2008.

The South Korean military cracked down on soldiers who have "critical apps" installed in their smartphones; allegedly marking a popular South Korean podcast, Naneun Ggomsuda, as anti-government content.

=== Education ===
On 15 February 2011, a Handong Global University professor was penalized for criticizing Lee Myung-bak and the university chancellor. Four teachers were arrested in 2020 for possessing North Korean books in internal study group.

=== Internet ===
While South Korea has relatively good internet and broadband penetration, its citizens do not have access to a free and unfiltered internet. South Korea's government maintains a broad-ranging approach toward the regulation of specific online content and imposes a substantial level of censorship on election-related discourse and on a large number of websites that the government deems subversive or socially harmful. Such policies are particularly pronounced with regard to anonymity on the Internet.

In 2011, the OpenNet Initiative classified Internet censorship in South Korea as pervasive in the conflict/security area, as selective in the social area, and found no evidence of filtering in the political or Internet tools areas. In 2011, South Korea was included on Reporters Without Borders list of countries Under Surveillance. The Electronic Frontier Foundation has criticized the Korea Communications Standards Commission for proposing censorship of the blog of an internet free speech activist.

In September 2004, North Korea launched the Kim Il-sung Open University website. Also, South Korea has banned at least 31 sites considered sympathetic to North Korea through the use of IP blocking. A man who praised North Korea on Twitter was arrested.

In 2007, numerous bloggers were censored, arrested, and had their posts deleted by police for expressing criticism of, or even support for, certain presidential candidates. Subsequently, in 2008, just before a new presidential election, new legislation that required all major internet portal sites to require identity verification of their users was put into effect. A 51 year old South Korean novelist was arrested for praising North Korea on their personal blog in 2012. 5 South Koreans were arrested for distributing pro-North material online in 2008 and 83 in 2011. In 2011, a South Korean was arrested for posting 300 messages and 6 videos of pro-North content and sentenced for 10 months in jail. In January 2012, a South Korean freedom-of-speech activist was arrested for retweeting a tweet from a North Korean account. A 53 year old South Korean blogger was arrested for demanding abolishment of an anti-communist National Security Law and for praising North Korea, he was sentenced to one year in prison.

"Indecent" websites, such as those offering unrated games, any kind of pornography (not only child pornography), and gambling, are also blocked. Attempts to access these sites are automatically redirected to the warning page stating "This site is legally blocked by the government regulations." Search engines are required to verify age for some keywords deemed inappropriate for minors.

In 2021, South Korea's largest messenger app, KakaoTalk, began censoring real-time pornographic clips or 19+ video clips in open chat at the request of the government, and NetxHack.com, South Korea's most popular VPN reviewer, tested the system with dozens of users and found it to be flawed, with even scenes from G-rated anime and photos that shouldn't be objectionable to children being censored.

=== Music ===
In November 2010, a woman was sentenced to two years in prison for the possession of MP3s of instrumental music, on the grounds that the titles constituted praise of North Korea, notwithstanding the actual music's lack of lyrics.

Songs that "stimulates sex desire or [are] sexually explicit to youth", "urges violence or crime to youth", or "glamorizes violence such as rape, and drugs" are classified as a "medium offensive to youth" by the Government Youth Commission.

=== Broadcasting ===
The Korea Communications Commission is a government agency that regulates TV, radio, and the Internet within South Korea. The National Security Law forbids citizens from listening to North Korean radio programs in their homes if the government determines that the action endangers national security or the basic order of democracy. These prohibitions are rarely enforced and viewing North Korean satellite telecasts in private homes is legal.

The Lee Myung-bak government has been accused of extending its influence over the broadcast media by appointing former presidential aides and advisers to key positions at major media companies over the objections of journalists who sought to maintain those broadcasters' editorial independence. Under the Lee administration, approximately 160 journalists have been penalized for writing critical reports about government policies.

Protests among workers in Munhwa Broadcasting Corporation, Korean Broadcasting System, and YTN in early 2012 have raised concerns about the biased pro-Lee Myung-bak government media practices, such as the ongoing usage of censorship, to the South Korean public.

Censorship of Japanese media in South Korea has been relaxed significantly since the 1990s, but as of 2017, the terrestrial broadcast of Japanese television or music remains restricted under the government's Communications Commission that the permission is necessary for nationwide media companies beforehand to broadcast Japanese musics and films.

=== Films ===
Film censorship in South Korea can be split into two major periods, the period of dictatorships and the period of heavy surveillance by the new military regime.

In recent years, sexual scenes have been a major issue that pits filmmakers against the Korea Media Rating Board. Pubic hair and male or female genitalia are disallowed on the screen, unless they are digitally blurred. In rare cases extreme violence, obscene language, or certain portrayals of drug use may also be an issue. Korea has a five level rating systems; G (all), PG-12 (12-year+), PG-15 (15-year+), R-19 (19-year+), and Restricted.

== Influence by other countries ==
Like many countries, some South Korean media have been affected by Chinese censorship abroad. For example, in 2016, Chinese embassy successfully lobbied to halt theatrical production by American Shen Yun company, affiliated with Falun Gong movement banned in China.

== See also ==
- Defensive democracy
- Copyright law of South Korea
- Internet censorship in South Korea
- North Korea–South Korea relations
- OpenNet, South Korean NGO against censorship
