= Korea Communications Standards Commission =

Government agency

- 방송통신심의위원회

Commission overview
- Formed: February 2008; 18 years ago
- Preceding agencies: Information and Communication Ethics Committee; Korea Broadcasting Commission
- Jurisdiction: South Korea
- Headquarters: Yangcheon District, Seoul
- Commission executive: Kang, Sang-Hyun, Chairman
- Website: www.kocsc.or.kr

Korean name
- Hangul: 방송통신심의위원회
- Hanja: 放送通信審議委員會
- RR: Bangsong tongsin simui wiwonhoe
- MR: Pangsong t'ongsin simŭi wiwŏnhoe

The Korea Communications Standards Commission (Korean: 방송통신심의위원회) is an institution of the South Korean government that regulates communications including film, television, radio, and internet.

At its formation in 2008, the KCSC replaced an earlier body, the Information and Communication Ethics Committee.

In September 2011, the KCSC decided to open up its three discussion committees to the public.

== TV program ratings ==
Current Korean television rating system icons

The South Korean television rating system has been in force since 2000, and it started with only four classifications which were All, 7, 13 and 19. In February 2001, all programs - except domestic dramas (which had been enforced since November 2002) - are required to be rated, unless they qualify for exemption; however, a broadcaster may still apply a rating, even if the program is exempt.

- All (모든 연령 시청가): This rating is for programs that are appropriate for all ages. Television programs with this rating may contain some violence and/or some mild language. No adult content is allowed.
- 7 (7세 이상 시청가): This rating is for programs that are suitable for those above 7 years old. Television programs with this rating can contain mild violence, mild language and few romance.
- 12 (12세 이상 시청가): This rating is for programs that are suitable for those above 12 years old. Television programs with this rating may contain horror, some fantasy violence, some sexual content, little use of strong language, mild blood, and/or mild suggestive themes.
- 15 (15세 이상 시청가): This rating is for programs that are suitable for those above 15 years old. TV shows with this rating may contain use of alcohol, more sexual content, mild violence or little strong violence, major blood or gore, and/or suggestive themes.
- 19 (19세 이상 시청가): This rating is for programs that are suitable for those above 19 years old. 19-rated programming is banned from airing during the hours of 7:00AM to 9:00AM, and 1:00PM to 10:00PM. (7:00 AM to 10:00 PM on Weekends and Public Holidays Only) Programs that receive this rating will almost certainly have adult themes, sexual situations, strong language and disturbing scenes of violence.
- Exempt (no icon or name): This rating is only for knowledge based game shows; lifestyle shows; documentary shows; news; current topic discussion shows; education/culture shows; sports that excludes MMA or other violent sports; and other programs that the Korea Communications Standards Commission recognizes. Disclaimer or rating icons are not needed.

South Korean television ratings do not include content descriptors or advisories as they do in most other nations. The ratings are therefore used in a broader sense.

== Censorship ==
From 2004 to some time before 2013, the KCSC has required Korean citizens to enter government issued ID numbers in order to post political comments online.

During the presidency of Lee Myung-bak the KCSC was criticized for a perceived heavy bias in favor of the Lee Myung-bak government. On August 3, 2008, KCSC requested the internet portal, Daum, to delete posts and comments negative towards Lee Myung-bak during the heyday of the anti-beef imports.

Some lay members of the National Assembly protested against KCSC's censorship-like decision to monitor content in social network services and mobile applications.

Moon Yong-sik (문용식) CEO of the South Korean internet contents company, Nowcom, has expressed concerns about the KCSC becoming a tool to monitor and to censor online content that expresses anti-government and anti-big business messages.

The KCSC had considered penalizing SBS and MBC for showing Twitter messages that are critical against President Lee and his government.

=== SNS ===
The KCSC planned to set up a regulatory office dedicated to supervising posts on SNS outlets. However, the Constitutional Court of Korea ruled against KCSC's decision to regulate voting-related posts on SNS outlets.

== Criticism ==
- Fans of South Korea's popular variety show, Infinite Challenge criticized the KCSC for pointing out negative remarks towards the show regarding its usage of words based on outdated standards.

== See also ==
- Censorship in South Korea
- Korea Communications Commission
