= Kim Byung-joo (general) =

South Korean general (born 1962)

- 김병주
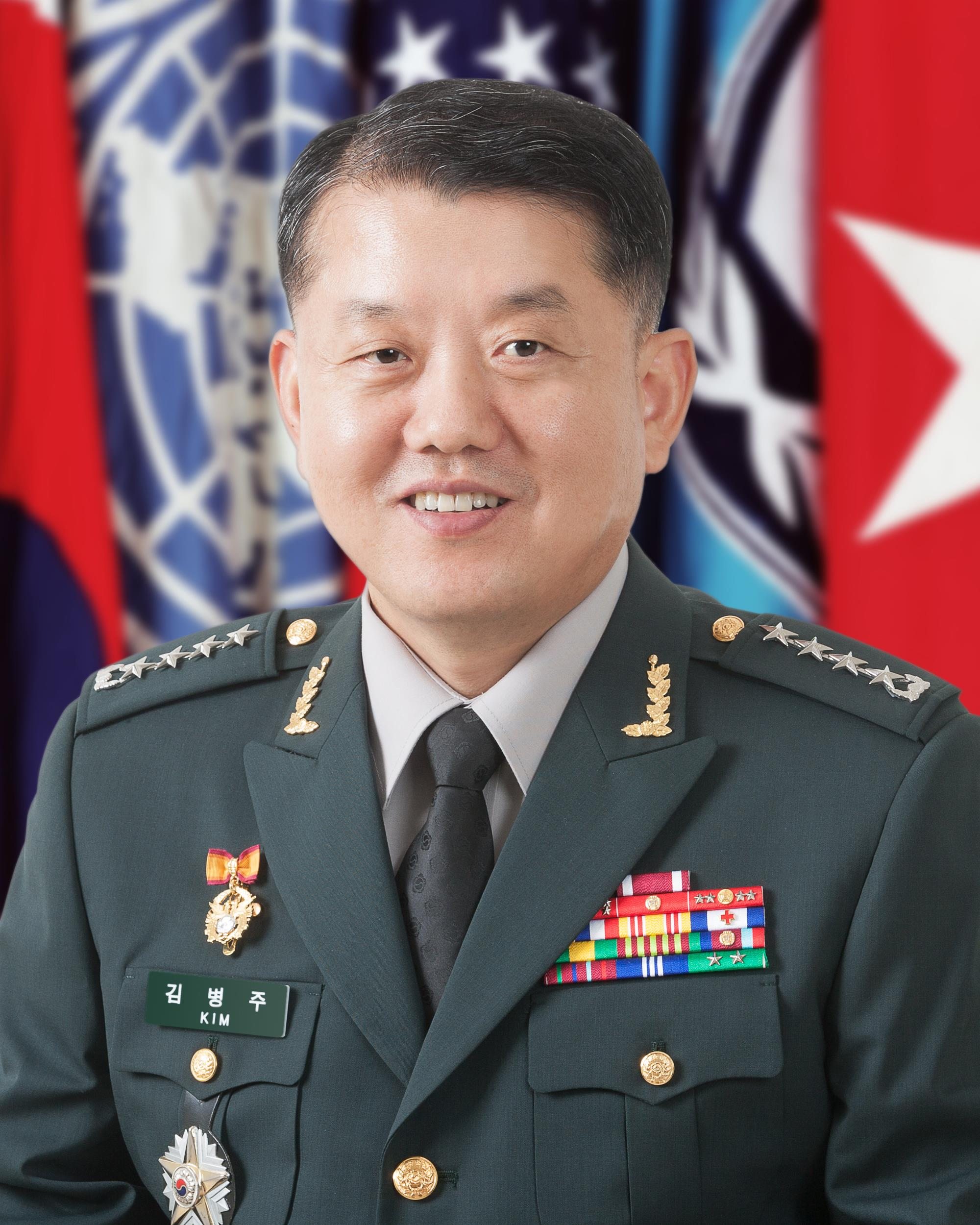

Member of the National Assembly
- Incumbent
- Assumed office May 30, 2020
- Constituency: Proportional representation

Personal details
- Born: 7 February 1962 (age 64) Yecheon County, South Korea
- Party: Democratic Party of Korea
- Other political affiliations: Platform Party (2020)

Military service
- Allegiance: South Korea
- Branch/service: Republic of Korea Army
- Years of service: 1980–2019
- Rank: General
- Commands: 28th Infantry Division (Rep. Korea); United States Central Command; ROK-U.S. Combined Forces Command; Joint Chiefs of Staff (Rep. Korea); 6th Infantry Division (Rep. Korea); 2nd Artillery Brigade (Rep. Korea); 30th Infantry Division (Rep. Korea); Army Missile Command (Rep. Korea); 3rd Army (Rep. Korea)

Korean name
- Hangul: 김병주
- Hanja: 金炳周
- RR: Gim Byeongju
- MR: Kim Pyŏngju

Kim Byung-joo (Korean: 김병주, born 7 February 1962 in Yecheon County) is a South Korean politician and retired four star General in the Republic of Korea Army. He was the 27th deputy commander of the ROK/US Combined Forces Command and is a current member of the Korean National Assembly.

== Career ==
In 1980, he joined the Korea Military Academy and served among others as artillery officer in the Korean Army and liaison officer at the United States Central Command. 2017, he became the first four star general in South Korea with a missile command background and at the same time, he assumed command of the ROK/US Combined Forces Command as deputy commander behind Vincent K. Brooks. He retired in April 2019.

Afterwards, he joined the Democratic Party of Korea and was elected in 2020 South Korean legislative election as a proportional representative to the 21st Korean National Assembly, where he engaged in legislative activities. He also served as the Chairman of the National Defense and Security Special Committee and the Chairman of the 2nd Policy Coordination Committee of the Democratic Party of Korea.

In the 2024 South Korean legislative election, he ran as a Democratic Party candidate in Namyangju- eul, Gyeonggi Province, and was successfully re-elected. He is currently working on the National Assembly Defense Committee, taking advantage of his military career.
