= 2016–2017 South Korean protests =

Calls to impeach President Park Geun-hye

- Part of the 2016 South Korean political scandal
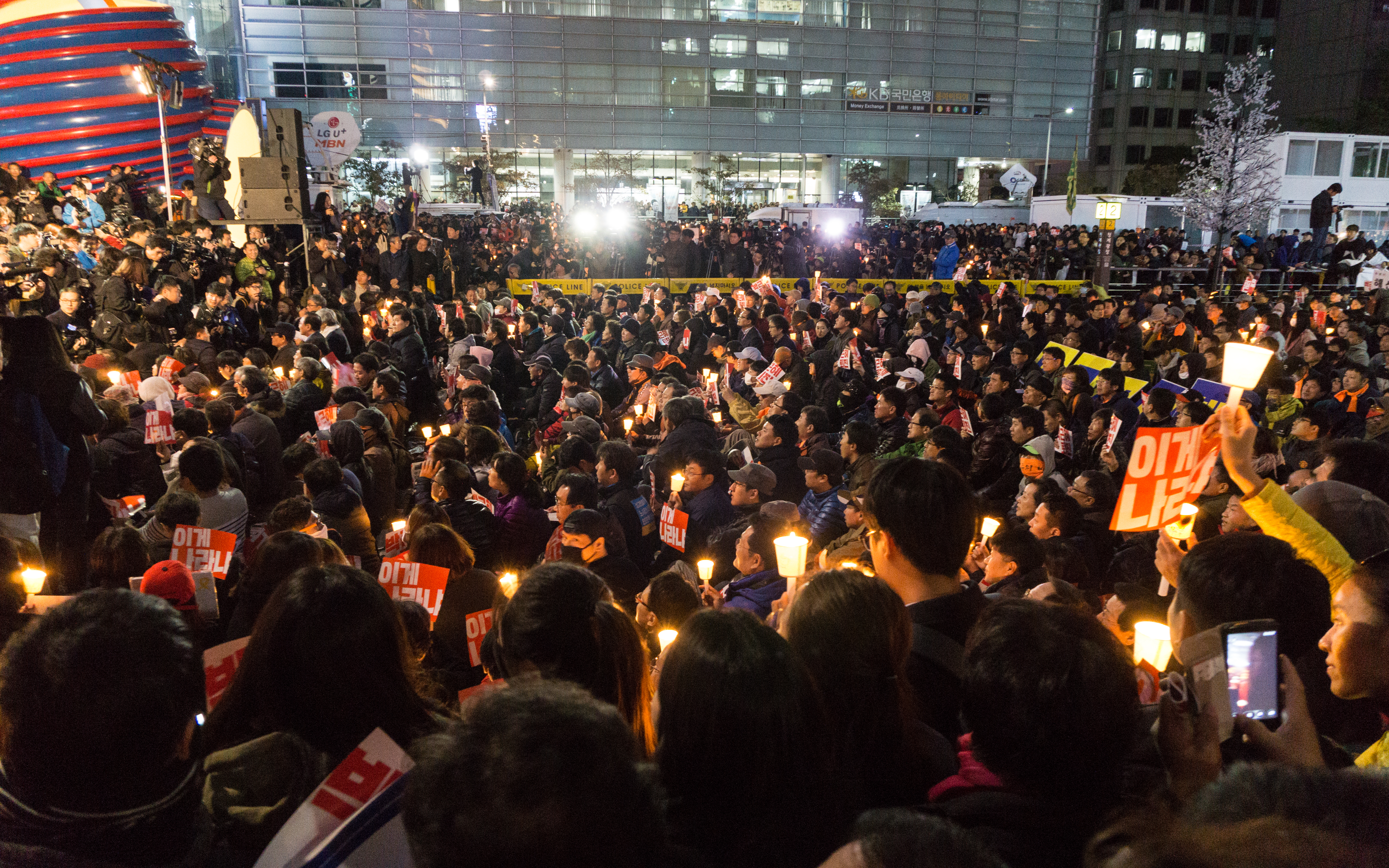
- Mass protests in Seoul, October 2016
- Date: 26 October 2016 – 24 May 2017 (Note: With Park's impeachment on 10 March 2017, weekly protests ended on 11 March. The Park Geun-hye Resignation Nationwide Movement, which had organized protests since 9 November 2016, officially disbanded on 24 May 2017.) (6 months and 4 weeks)
- Location: South Korea, nationwide
- Caused by: Corruption (mainly the 2016 South Korean political scandal); Impeachment of President Park Geun-hye (Pro-Park rallies)
- Goals: Resignation of Park Geun-hye, punishment of Choi Soon-sil, dissolution of Liberty Korea Party
- Methods: Civil resistance, demonstrations, protest marches, picketing
- Result: Park Geun-hye's impeachment and removal from office by the Constitutional Court of Korea; New presidential elections held in May 2017; Moon Jae-in elected President

Parties
Organizing Committee for People's Candlelight Demonstrations in Korea: Korean Confederation of Trade Unions; Korean Peasants League; Korean Teachers and Education Workers Union; People's Solidarity for Participatory Democracy; Federation of Korean Trade Unions; Democratic Party; Green Party; Labor Party; Justice Party; People Party; Supported by: Anti-Park faction of the Liberty Korea Party; Bareun Party	Government of South Korea; National Police Agency; Seoul Metropolitan Police Agency	Protesters; Miscellaneous right-wing groups Supported by: Pro-Park faction of the Liberty Korea Party

Lead figures
Non-centralised Leadership	Park Geun-hye; Hwang Kyo-ahn	Non-centralised Leadership

Casualties and losses
55 protesters injured	4 officers injured	

- 2016–2017 South Korean protests
- Hangul: 촛불 집회
- Hanja: 촛불集會
- RR: chotbul jiphoe
- MR: ch'oppul chiphoe

The 2016–2017 South Korean protests (Note: Also known as the Park Geun-hye Resignation Movement, the Candlelight Revolution (Korean: 촛불혁명), the Candlelight Demonstrations, or the Candlelight Vigil (Korean: 촛불집회)) were a series of protests against President Park Geun-hye that occurred throughout South Korea from November 2016 to March 2017. Protesters denounced the Park administration's 2016 political scandal and called for the resignation of Park Geun-hye.

After the impeachment of Park Geun-hye on corruption charges in December, the pro-Park rallies mobilized thousands of protesters for counter demonstrations. In February 2017, the Liberty Korea Party, at the time the ruling party of South Korea, claimed that the size of pro-Park rallies had surpassed the size of anti-Park rallies.

== Background ==
In October 2016, a political scandal erupted over President Park Geun-hye's undisclosed links to Choi Soon-sil, a woman with no security clearance and no official position, who was found to have been giving secret counsel to the president.

Choi had known Park since the 1970s, as Choi's father, Choi Tae-min, was a mentor for Park Chung Hee, then-president and Park Geun-hye's father. At the time, the Park family was still grieving from the assassination of the first-lady Yuk Young-soo, and Choi Tae-min claimed that he could channel communication with her. Both had remained friends since, even after Park Geun-hye became president. Park's behavior during her tenure had raised suspicions, due to her lack of communication with parts of the government and the press.

Choi, who had no official government position, was revealed to have access to confidential documents and information from the president, and acted as a close confidant for the president. Choi and Park's senior staff used their influence to extort ₩77.4 billion (~$774 million) from Korean chaebols – family-owned large business conglomerates – setting up two media and sports-related foundations, the Mir and K-sports foundations. Choi embezzled money during the process, and it is reported that some of the funds were used to support her daughter Chung Yoo-ra's dressage activities in Germany. She was also accused of rigging the admissions process at Ewha Womans University to help her daughter get accepted at the university. Ahn Jong-bum, a top presidential aide, was arrested for abusing power and helping Choi; he denied wrongdoing and claims he simply followed presidential orders.

On October 25, 2016, Park publicly acknowledged her close ties with Choi. On October 28, Park dismissed key members of her top office staff and Park's opinion rating dropped to 5%, the lowest ever for a sitting South Korean president. Her approval rating ranged from 1 to 3% for Korean citizens under 60 years of age, while it remained higher at 13% for the over 60 years age group.

This also prompted President Park to fire members of her cabinet and the prime minister of South Korea in order to redirect the public's criticism. In particular, the sacking of the prime minister Hwang Kyo-ahn resulted in a controversy, due to the claim that his firing had been done via text message.

== History ==
=== 2016 ===
On October 29, the first candlelight protest was held with about 20,000 participants (estimates range from 10,000 to 30,000). The numbers grew rapidly in the following weeks.

==== November ====
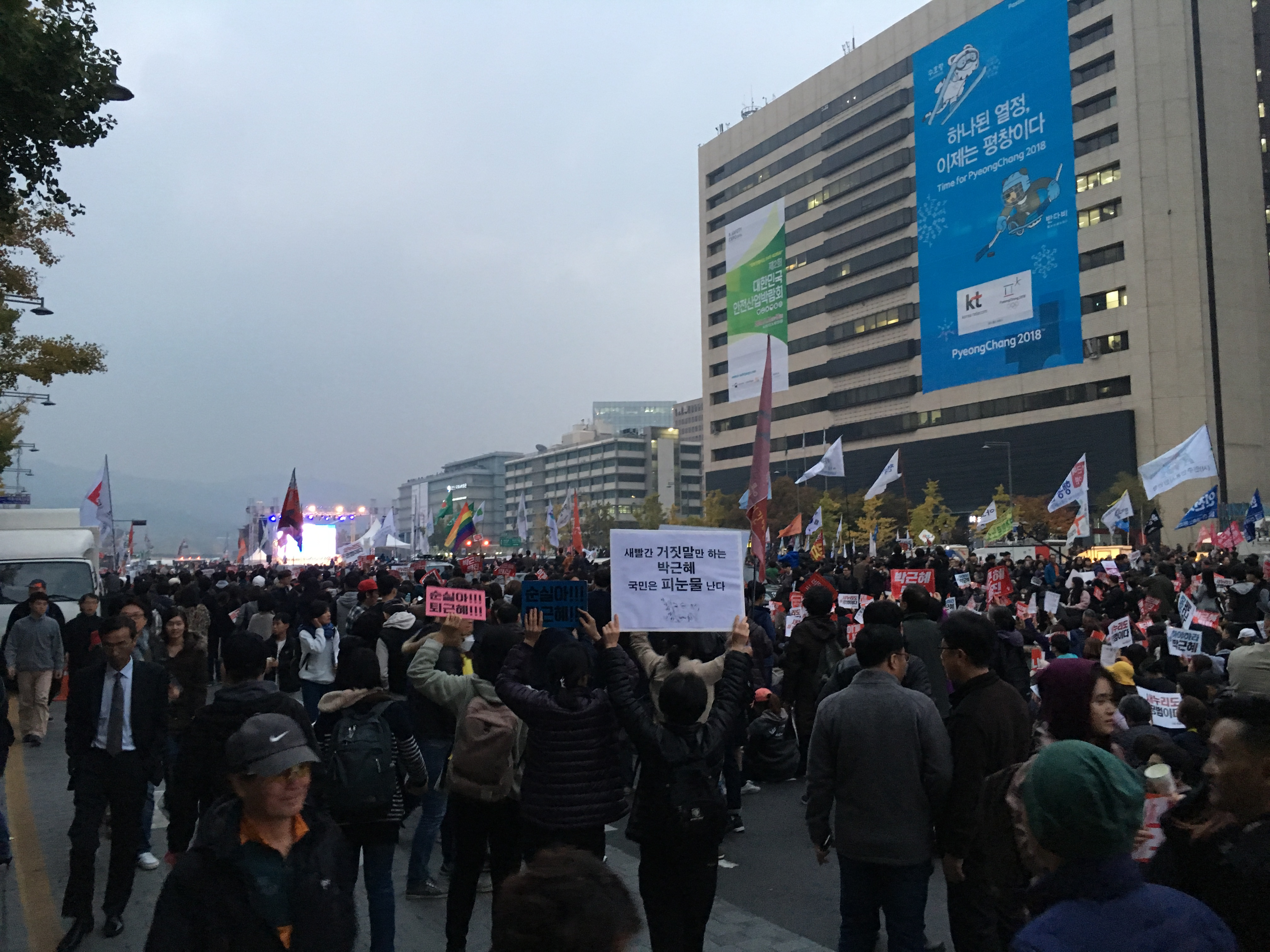
Protesters gather in Seoul on November 5, 2016

On November 1, a man used an excavator to crash into the front entrance of the Supreme Prosecutors' Office building during a protest in Seoul.

On November 5, people attended rally early on Saturday evening petition for Park's resignation. The police estimated 43,000, but organizers claimed more than 100,000.

On November 12, four officers were injured during the demonstrations. Twenty-six protesters were taken to hospital with injuries and a further 29 were treated at the scene of the protests.

On November 19, a large number of South Korean high school students also joined the crowds after taking the college entrance test. A short drive away from the protest, a group of conservative counter protesters gathered outside Seoul station in defense of the president until December 17.

On November 28, 1.9 million people hit the streets in a nationwide anti-president rally

==== December ====
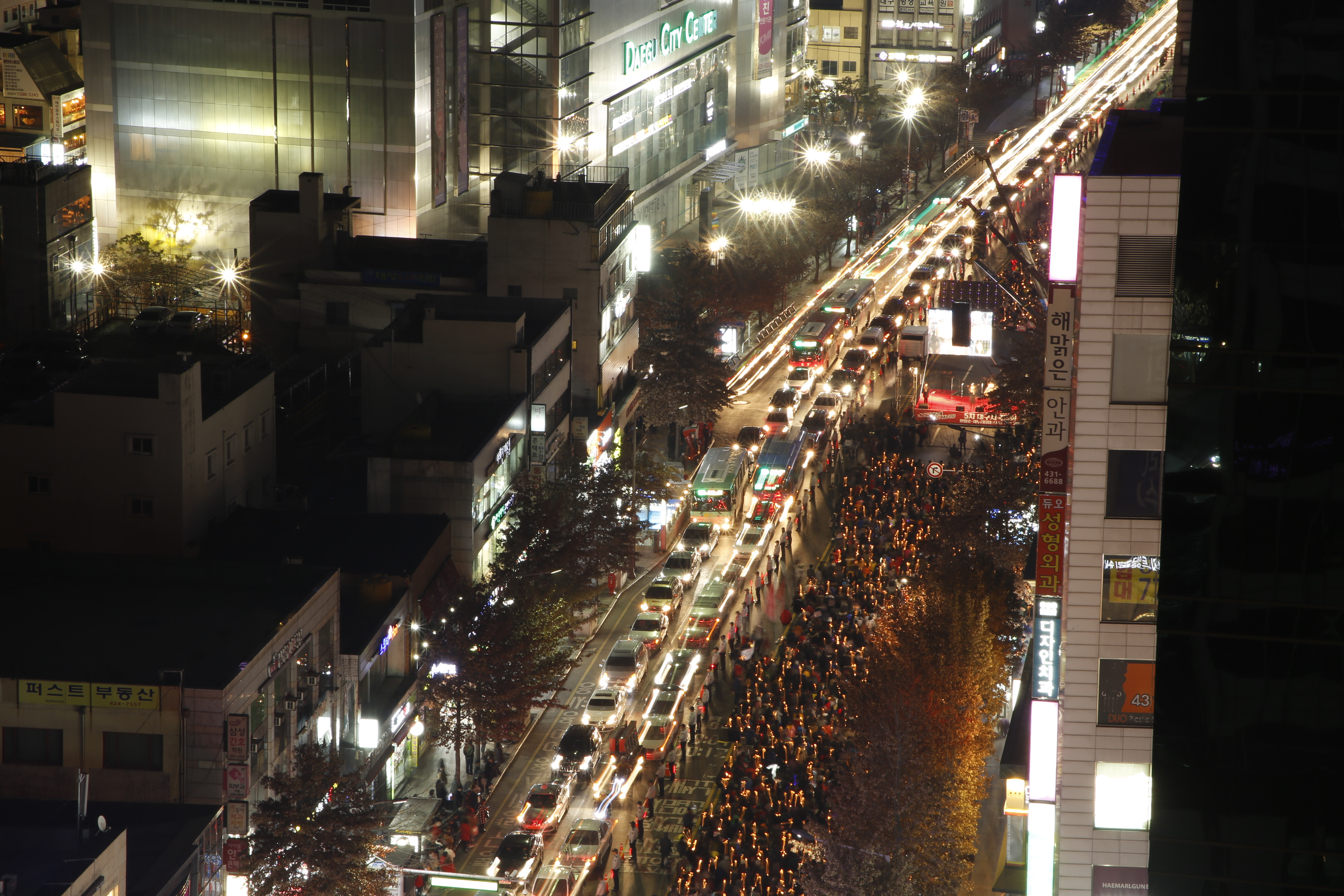
Mass protest against President Park Geun-hye in Daegu, December 3, 2016

On 3 December 2.3 million people hit the streets in a further anti-Park rally, one of the largest in the country's history. An estimated 1.6 million people gathered around the main boulevards from the City Hall to Gwanghwamun Square and the palace Gyeongbokgung. Another estimated 200,000 people gathered around the city of Busan and 100,000 in Gwangju.

On December 10, following the National Assembly's vote to impeach Park, hundreds of thousands gathered for weekly protests celebrating the move.

But, on December 17, pro-Park supporters held their first major demonstrations in Seoul, with organizers claiming an attendance of one million. They called for the reinstatement of the currently impeached president.

On December 24, 550,000 people held the Christmas Santa Rally, calling for the Park's immediate removal.

On December 31, South Koreans celebrate New Year's Eve with mass protest. Over 1 million people take to the street according to Organizer, brought the cumulative number of people who have attended the protests since October to 10 millions, the largest weekly protest in South Korean history.

=== 2017 ===
==== January ====
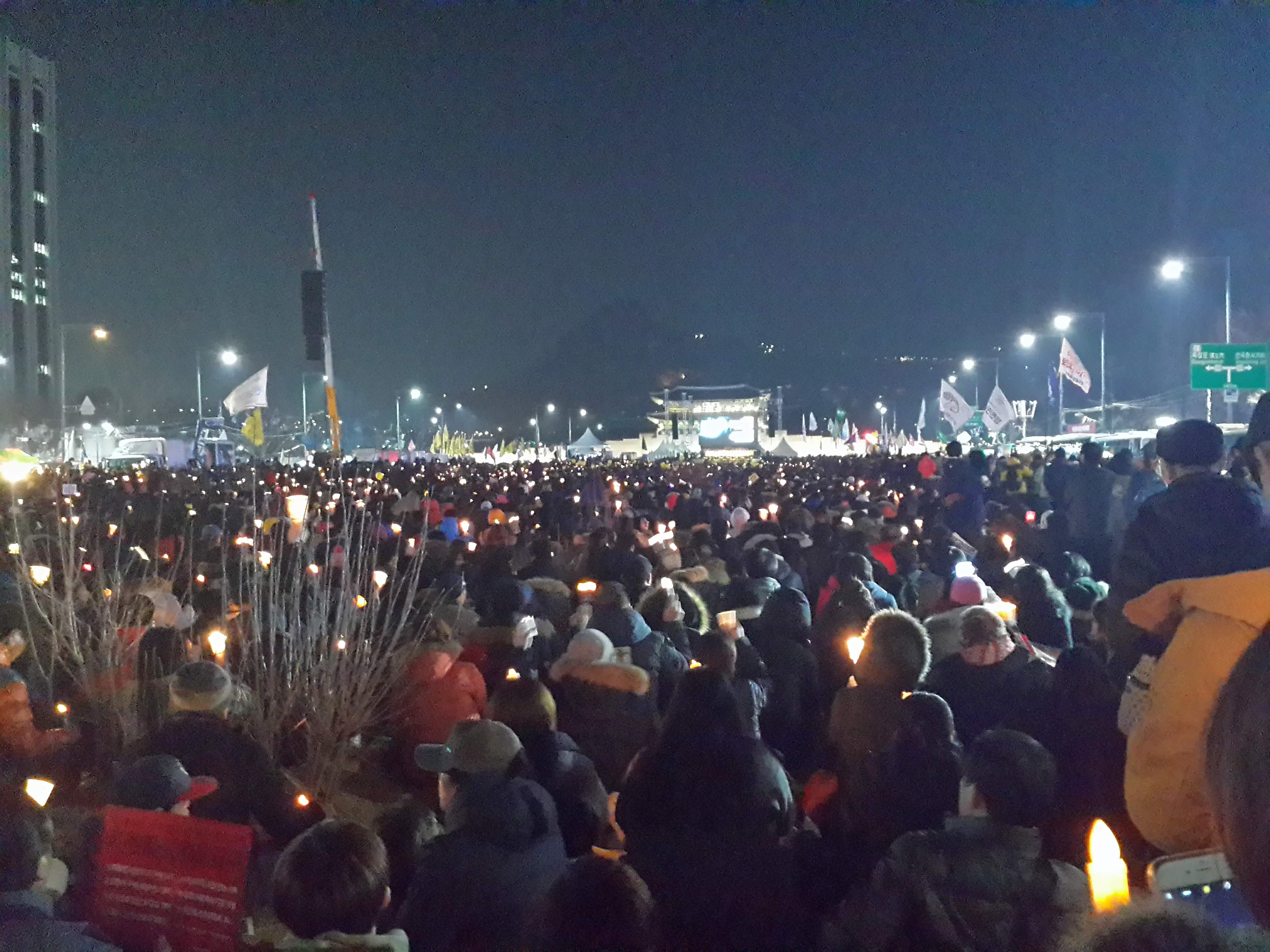
Candlelight protest against President Park Geun-hye in Seoul, January 7, 2017

On January 7, hundreds of thousands of protestors returned to the streets of Seoul demanding impeached President's immediate removal and the salvaging of a sunken ferry which left more than 300 dead. At 7 pm (10:00 GMT) hundreds of yellow balloons were released and the protestors blew out the candles they were carrying as a symbolic gesture asking that Park clarify the mystery surrounding her seven-hour absence at the time of the ferry sinking.

On January 21, South Koreans took to the streets Saturday to demand the arrest of the Samsung scion whose arrest warrant was rejected by a court last week, in the 13th candlelit protest calling for President Park Geun-hye to resign. Braving snow and cold, hundreds of thousands of protesters also demanded the Constitutional Court expedite review of Park's impeachment.

==== February ====
As the Candlelight rallies reached 100th day, on February 4, 400,000 people gathered at Gwanghwamun Plaza in Seoul, calling for an extension of the Special Prosecutor's investigation and for Park to step down immediately.

On February 11, hundreds of thousands of Koreans took to the streets where both pro- and anti-impeachment groups held their respective rallies. Those who opposed Park held their 15th weekly candlelight rally in Gwanghwamun Square, while her supporters waved South Korean flags outside of Seoul City Hall for their 12th rally. Presidential hopefuls including provincial governor An Hee-jung and former leader of the main opposition Democratic Party Moon Jae-in attended the anti-Park rally. Rhee In-je of the ruling Saenuri Party attended the pro-Park rally "to be part of the patriotic people's wave," while Ahn Cheol-soo, a former chair of the minor opposition People's Party, did not attend either rally.

After Samsung vice-chairman Lee Jae-Yong was arrested at February 17 by Special Prosecutors on charges of bribery in connection with the scandal, 700,000 people walked to the street on February 18. Protesters urged the Constitutional Court, currently reviewing the legitimacy of the impeachment, to promptly reach a conclusion for the ouster of the president..

On February 25, Hundreds of thousands of Koreans held rival demonstrations in Seoul over the impeachment of President Park Geun-hye on the fourth anniversary of her swearing into office. Anti-Park protest organizers claimed a one million turnout and pro-Park supporters said they had attracted three million. The demonstrations come as court prepares to hold final hearing on president's impeachment over corruption scandal.

==== March ====
After Constitutional court removed Park Geun-hye from power over a corruption scandal, ousted South Korean President Park Geun-hye maintained her silence on Saturday as her opponents and supporters divided the capital's streets with massive rallies that showed a nation deeply split over its future. Carrying flags and candles and cheering jubilantly, tens of thousands of people occupied a boulevard in downtown Seoul to celebrate Park's ouster. Meanwhile, in a nearby grass square, a large crowd of Park's supporters glumly waved national flags near a stage where organizers, wearing red caps and military uniforms, vowed to resist what they are calling "political assassination."

Nearly 20,000 police officers were deployed on Saturday to monitor the protesters, who were also separated by tight perimeters created by hundreds of police buses. They also held Rival rallies on March 1 and 4 respectively.

== Impeachment of Park Geun-hye ==
On December 3, 2016, three opposition parties agreed to introduce a joint impeachment motion against President Park Geun-hye. The motion, which was signed by 171 of 300 lawmakers, was put to a vote on Friday, December 9, 2016, and passed with 234 out of 300 votes, a tally much greater than the required 2/3 majority and which included 62 members of Park's Saenuri Party. The Impeachment process then moved to the Constitutional Court of Korea which could take 180 days to review the impeachment.

Park Geun-hye was finally impeached on March 10, 2017.

== Protests to rally for Park Geun-hye ==
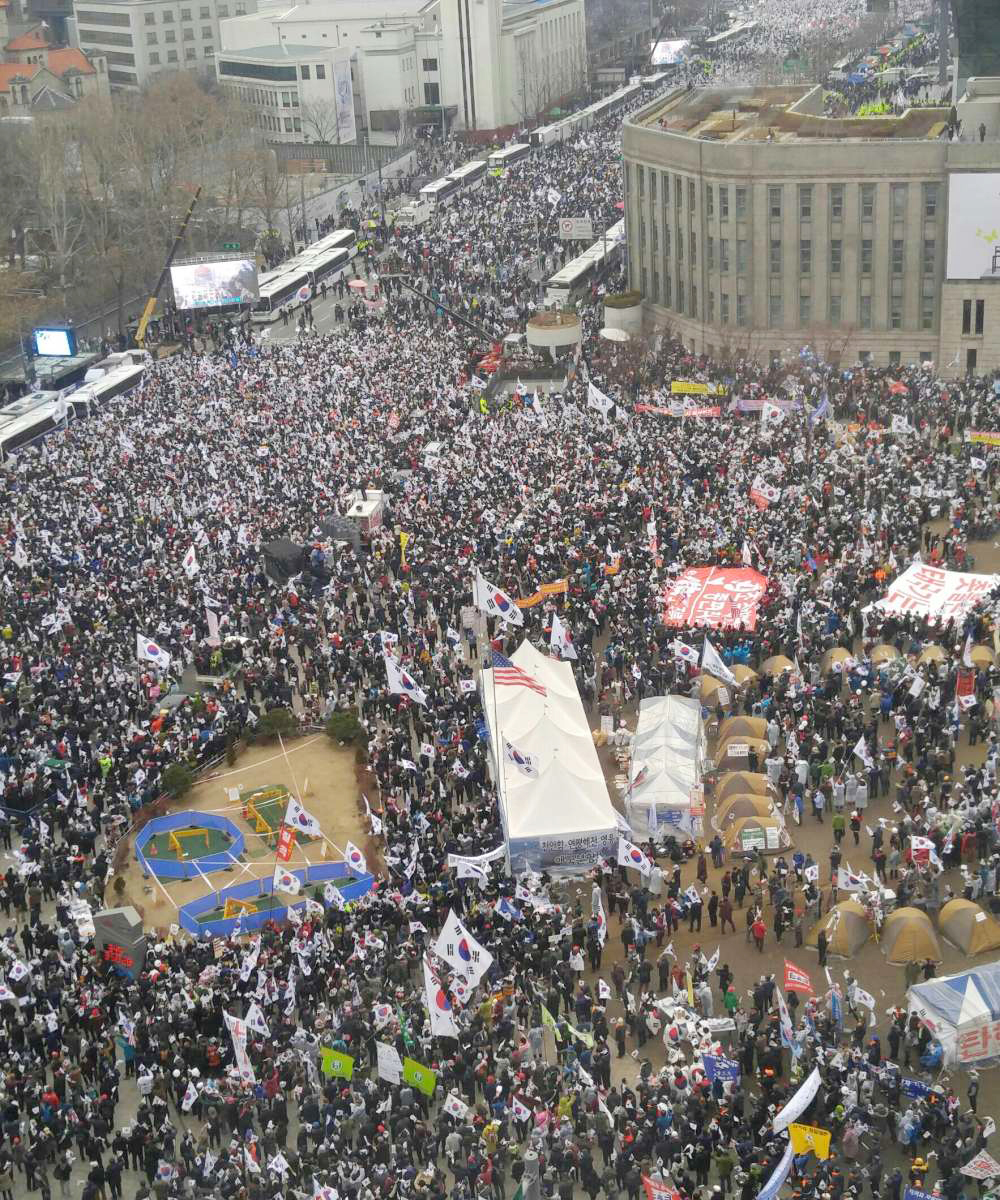
Pro-Park Geun-hye rallies at Seoul Plaza on March 1, 2017

=== 2016 ===
On October 31, 2016, a group of conservative protesters organized a protest in front of the South Korean media JTBC headquarters, claiming its coverage of the scandal was biased and unfounded.

On November 19, 2016, thousands of Park's supporters staged their protests in central Seoul, calling on the president not to succumb to mounting pressure on her to step aside.

On December 17, 2016, the pro-Park protesters blamed the media for fueling anti-Park sentiment, focusing their coverage too much on the views of younger and liberal voters and on criticism that Park received cosmetic procedures while in office.

=== 2017 ===
Pro-president rallies have grown substantially. On January 14, 2017, the organizers of the protests claim that 1.2 million people gathered in central Seoul, insisting that the Constitutional Court should reject the impeachment.

While the anti-Park protests once attracted more than a million but shrank after Park's impeachment, the number of pro-Park protesters reached 2.1 million and began to overwhelm their rivals, according to the organizer's claims. Claims from the organizers has been criticized for almost unrealistic exaggeration of the number of participants.

== Number of protesters ==
Date	Anti-Park Geun-hye			Police officers	Pro-Park Geun-hye		
Date	Police estimate	Organiser claim	Seoul estimate	Police officers	Police estimate	Organiser claim	Media estimate
October 29, 2016	12,000	50,000		4,800			
November 5, 2016	45,000	300,000		17,600			
November 12, 2016	260,000	1,060,000	1,320,000	25,000			
November 19, 2016	at least 155,000	960,000	220,000		11,000	67,000	
November 26, 2016	330,000	1,900,000-2,000,000	1,660,000	25,000			
December 3, 2016	more than 424,000	at least 2,300,000	1,880,000	20,000	1,500	15,000	
December 10, 2016	166,000	1,043,400	790,000	18,000	40,000	213,000	
December 17, 2016	77,000	770,000		18,240	30,000	1,000,000	
December 24, 2016	53,000	702,000		14,700	21,000	1,700,000	
December 31, 2016	60,000	1,104,000		18,400	17,000	725,000	
January 7, 2017	38,000	643,380		14,720	37,000	1,000,000	
January 14, 2017	unknown	146,700		14,700	unknown	1,200,000	
January 21, 2017	unknown	353,400		15,500	unknown	1,500,000	
February 4, 2017	unknown	425,500		14,600	unknown	1,300,000	
February 11, 2017	unknown	750,000		16,000	unknown	2,100,000	
February 18, 2017	unknown	700,000		15,200	unknown	"2,500,000"	
February 25, 2017	unknown	1,000,000		15,200-17,000	unknown	"3,000,000"	
Mar 1, 2017	unknown	300,000		unknown	unknown	"5,000,000"	
March 4, 2017	unknown	900,000		15,900	unknown	"5,000,000"	
March 8 – 11, 2017	unknown	700,000		16,000	unknown	"7,000,000"	
Total	1,648,000 (as January 7, 2017)	±16,000,000 (excluding March 1 rally)		356,460	157,500 (as January 7, 2017)	"±30,000,000" (as March 11, 2017, excluding March 1 rally); *Pro-Park organization's claim on the number of participants has been criticized as "unrealistic" and "exaggerated"	

== Casualties ==
On March 11, 2017, police say 3 people were killed and dozens were injured in clashes between police and Park's supporters after the Constitutional Court of Korea ruled the impeachment valid.

== Controversy ==
At around 5 p.m. on March 4, 2017, MBC reporters covering a rally in favor of impeachment at Gwanghwamun Square in Seoul were assaulted with their fists by two men who participated in the rally

Two Munhwa Broadcasting Corporation staff, reporter Kim Se-ui and announcer Choi Dae-hyun, had their photo taken with "Ilbe Monk" Jeong Han-Yeong holding a giant novelty shield with US and Korean flags emblazoned with the slogan "It's OK to kill commies."

== Plans for a military crackdown on protests ==
In July 2018, it emerged that the Defense Security Command made plans for declaring martial law and authority to use military force to crack down on protesters, if the Constitutional Court did not uphold Park's removal from office. The DSC had planned to mobilize 200 tanks, 550 armoured vehicles, 4,800 armed personnel and 1,400 members of special forces in Seoul in order to enforce martial law. Other components of the plan included monitoring and censoring media content and arresting politicians taking part in protests.

== See also ==
- Protests against Donald Trump
- People Power Revolution
- 2015–2016 protests in Brazil
