= Chung Yoon-hoi =

South Korean businessman

- Born: 1955 (age 70–71)
- Education: Kyung Hee University (Master's Degree)
- Spouse: Choi Soon-sil (m. 1995; div. 2014)
- Children: Chung Yoo-ra

Korean name
- Hangul: 정윤회
- Hanja: 鄭潤會
- RR: Jeong Yunhoe
- MR: Chŏng Yunhoe

Chung Yoon-hoi (born 1955) is a South Korean businessman. He was the chief of staff to president Park Geun-hye when she was a second-term lawmaker.

Tatsuya Kato, former Seoul bureau chief of the Sankei Shimbun newspaper, wrote an article alleging that after the sinking of MV Sewol ferry, President Park was incommunicado for seven important hours and could have been with Chung at that time. However, he was accused by Korean prosecutors of defaming President Park.

Chung married Choi Soon-sil in 1995, but they divorced in July 2014. Their daughter, Chung Yoo-ra, is a gold medalist in equestrian.
