= Park Geun-hye =

President of South Korea from 2013 to 2017

- 박근혜
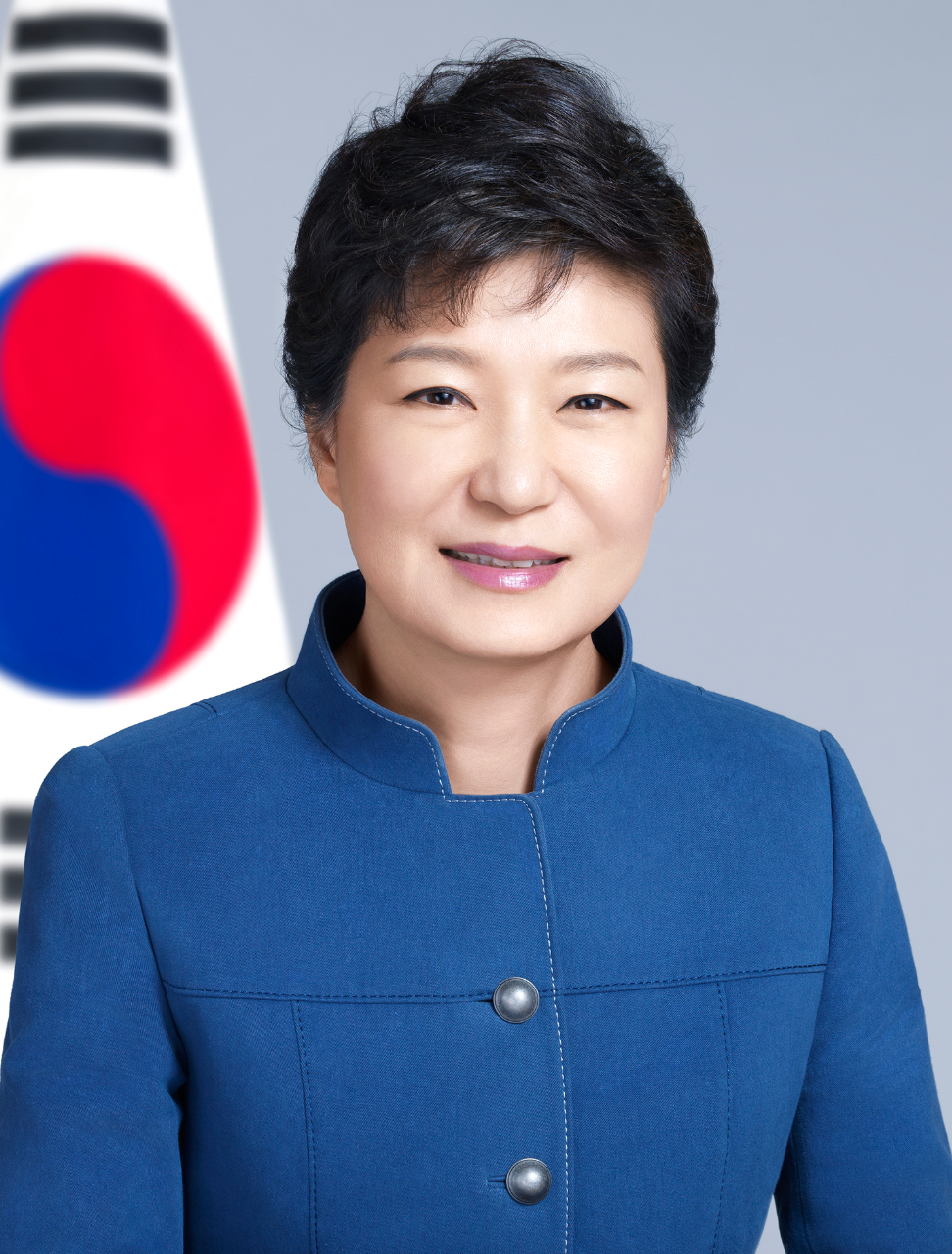
- Official portrait, 2013

11th President of South Korea
- In office 25 February 2013 – 10 March 2017 (Note: Her powers and duties were suspended from 9 December 2016, by the National Assembly until the final impeachment verdict on 10 March 2017.)
- Prime Minister: Chung Hong-won; Lee Wan-koo; Choi Kyoung-hwan (acting); Hwang Kyo-ahn
- Preceded by: Lee Myung-bak
- Succeeded by: Hwang Kyo-ahn (acting); Moon Jae-in

First Lady of South Korea
- Acting; 15 August 1974 – 26 October 1979
- President: Park Chung Hee
- Preceded by: Yuk Young-soo
- Succeeded by: Hong Gi

Leader of the Grand National Party from Feb. 2012: Saenuri Party
- In office 23 March 2004 – 15 June 2006
- Preceded by: Choi Byung-ryeol
- Succeeded by: Kim Yeong-seon (acting); Kang Jae-sup
- In office 19 December 2011 – 15 May 2012
- Preceded by: Hwang Woo-yea (acting)
- Succeeded by: Hwang Woo-yea

Member of the National Assembly
- In office 3 April 1998 – 29 May 2012
- Preceded by: Kim Suk-won
- Succeeded by: Lee Jong-jin
- Constituency: Dalseong (Daegu)
- In office 30 May 2012 – 25 November 2012
- Constituency: Proportional representation

Personal details
- Born: 2 February 1952 (age 74) Jung, Daegu, South Korea
- Party: Independent (since 2017)
- Other political affiliations: Grand National Party·Saenuri Party·Liberty Korea Party (Note: from 1997 until 2002; from 2002 until 2017); Korean Coalition for the Future (Note: May–November 2002)
- Parents: Park Chung Hee (father); Yuk Young-soo (mother)
- Education: Sogang University (BS)
- Criminal information
- Status: Pardoned by President Moon Jae-in on 24 December 2021 (4 years ago)
- Convictions: Coercion; abuse of power
- Penalty: 25 years imprisonment

Details
- Date apprehended: 31 March 2017

Korean name
- Hangul: 박근혜
- Hanja: 朴槿惠
- RR: Bak Geunhye
- MR: Pak Kŭnhye
- Park Geun-hye's voice Park Geun-hye on her plans on creating more trust and peace in the Korean Peninsula; Recorded 8 May 2013

Park Geun-hye (/ˈpɑːrk ˌɡʊn ˈheɪ/; Korean: 박근혜 [pak‿k͈ɯn.hje]; born 2 February 1952) is a South Korean politician who served as the 11th President of South Korea from 2013 until her removal from office in 2017. A member of the Grand National, Saenuri and Liberty Korea parties and the eldest daughter of the third president, Park Chung Hee, she was the first woman in the country and in East Asia to be elected as head of state. Park previously served as the acting first lady of South Korea under her father's presidency from 1974 until her father's assassination in 1979.

Born in Daegu, Park graduated from Sogang University in 1974 with a bachelor's degree in electronic engineering. Before her presidency, Park was leader of the conservative Grand National Party from 2004 to 2006 and again from 2011 to 2012, overseeing its rebrand to the Saenuri Party. She was also a member of the National Assembly, serving four consecutive parliamentary terms between 1998 and 2012. Park started her fifth term as a representative elected via national list in June 2012. In 2013 and 2014, Park ranked 11th on the Forbes list of the world's 100 most powerful women and the most powerful woman in East Asia. In 2014, she ranked 46th on the Forbes list of the world's most powerful people, the third-highest South Korean on the list, after Lee Kun-hee and Lee Jae-yong.

On 9 December 2016, Park was impeached by the National Assembly on charges related to influence peddling by her top aide, Choi Soon-sil. Then–Prime Minister Hwang Kyo-ahn assumed her powers and duties as acting president as a result. The Constitutional Court upheld the impeachment by a unanimous 8–0 ruling on 10 March 2017, thereby removing Park from office, making her the first Korean president to be so removed. On 6 April 2018, South Korean courts sentenced her to 24 years in prison (later increased to 25 years) for corruption and abuse of power.

In 2018, two separate criminal cases resulted in an increase of seven years in Park's prison sentence. She was found guilty of illegally taking off-the-books funds from the National Intelligence Service (NIS) and given a five-year prison sentence, and also found guilty of illegally interfering in the Saenuri Party primaries in the 2016 South Korean legislative election, for which she was sentenced to two more years in prison. On 24 December 2021, it was announced that she would receive a pardon on compassionate grounds from South Korean President Moon Jae-in. She was released from prison on 31 December and returned home three months later on 24 March 2022.

== Early life and education ==
Park Geun-hye was born on 2 February 1952, in Samdeok-dong of Jung District, Daegu, South Korea as the first child of Park Chung Hee, who came to power with the May 16 military coup d'état of 1961 and was the third president of South Korea from 1963 to 1979; and his wife, First Lady Yuk Young-soo. Both of her parents were assassinated. She has a younger sister, Park Geun-ryeong, and a younger brother, Park Ji-man. She also has an older half-sister, Park Jae-ok. She is unmarried with no children. Pew Research Center described her as an atheist with a Buddhist and Roman Catholic upbringing.

In 1953, Park's family moved to Seoul, where she graduated from Jangchung Elementary School and Sungshim (literal: Sacred Heart) Girls' Middle and High School in 1970, going on to receive a Bachelor of Science degree in electronic engineering from Sogang University in 1974. She briefly studied at Joseph Fourier University in France, but left following the murder of her mother.

Park's mother was killed on 15 August 1974, in the National Theater of Korea; Mun Se-gwang, a Japanese-born ethnic Korean sympathizer of North Korea and member of the Chongryon, was attempting to assassinate her husband, President Park Chung Hee. Park Geun-hye was regarded as First Lady until the assassination of her father by his intelligence chief, Kim Jae-gyu, on 26 October 1979. During this time, activists who were political opponents of Park's father claimed to be subject to arbitrary detention. Further, human rights were considered subordinate to economic development. In 2007, Park expressed regret at the treatment of activists during this period.

Park received honorary doctoral degrees from the Chinese Culture University in Taiwan in 1987, Pukyong National University and KAIST in 2008, Sogang University in 2010, and TU Dresden in 2014.

== Political career ==
=== Early career ===
Park was elected a Grand National Party (GNP; later the Liberty Korea Party, or Saenuri Party) assemblywoman for Dalseong County (Daegu) in the 1998 by-election, and three more times in the same electoral district between 1998 and 2008, being the incumbent assemblywoman until April 2012. In 2012, Park announced she would not run for a constituency representative seat for the 19th election in Dalseong, but for a proportional representative position for the Saenuri Party instead, in order to lead the party's election campaign. She was subsequently elected as a proportional representative in the April 2012 election.

Due to the failed attempt to impeach President Roh Moo-hyun and the bribery scandal of its 2002 presidential candidate, Lee Hoi-chang (revealed in 2004), the GNP was facing a defeat in the 2004 general election. Park was appointed chairwoman of the party and led the election efforts. In the election, the GNP lost its majority position but managed to win 121 seats, which was largely considered a great achievement under such inhospitable circumstances for the party. As the chairwoman of the GNP, Park helped her party make significant gains in local elections and actually obtain a majority in 2006.

During the campaign, on 20 May 2006 in Seoul, Ji Chung-ho, a 50-year-old man with eight criminal convictions, slashed Park's face with a utility knife, causing an 11-centimeter wound that required 60 stitches and several hours of surgery. A famous anecdote from this incident occurred when Park was hospitalized after the attack: the first word that she said to her secretary after her recovery from her wound was, "How is Daejeon?" After this, the GNP candidate in the Daejeon mayoral race won the election despite having trailed by more than 20 percentage points in opinion polls up to the point of the attack. In addition, during Park's term as the GNP chairwoman between 2004 and 2006, the party won all 40 reelections and by-elections held, which was largely credited to her influence and efforts. This feat gave Park the nickname "Queen of Elections".

On 12 February 2007, Park made a much-publicized visit to Harvard University in Cambridge, Massachusetts, United States. Her visit culminated in an address to a packed audience at the John F. Kennedy School of Government, where she said she wanted to save Korea and advocated a stronger relationship between South Korea and the United States.

Park hoped to emulate her father's success by becoming the presidential nominee of the GNP. She eventually lost to Lee Myung-bak by a narrow margin. Lee had a commanding lead at the beginning of the primary season, but Park was able to narrow the gap through allegations of Lee's corruption. Park won the "party members' bid", but she lost the "national bid", which is a larger percentage of the total presidential bid. After the 2007 presidential election, President Lee Myung-bak formed a government of mostly close supporters. Park's supporters argued that this was a kind of political reprisal and that they should secede from the GNP. Eventually, they formed parties named Pro-Park Coalition and Solidarity for Pro-Park Independents (친박 무소속 연대; Chin Park Musosok Yeondae). After the mass secession, the rebels announced that they would rejoin the GNP after the general election, but the party prohibited it. In the following 2008 general election, the rebels won 26 seats: fourteen from the Pro-Park Coalition and twelve as independents. Together, they played a pivotal role in the GNP's narrow majority. Park continually insisted that the GNP should allow the return of her supporters. As of 2011, most of these rebels had returned to the GNP, resulting in approximately 50 to 60 assembly members who supported Park out of 171 in the GNP.

In 2011, as a response to the dwindling approval rating of the GNP, the party formed an emergency committee and changed its name to the Saenuri Party, or "New Frontier" Party. On 19 December, Park was appointed as the chairwoman of the emergency committee, the de facto leader of the party. In the 2012 general election, the Saenuri Party achieved a surprise win against the opposing Democratic United Party, winning 152 seats and retaining its majority position. Because of the corruption scandals of the Lee administration revealed before the election, the party was widely expected to win no more than 100 seats. During the 13-day campaign period, Park traveled about 7,200 km (4,500 mi) around South Korea, visiting more than 100 constituencies. It is the consensus of Korean news media and political experts that the most important factor leading to Saenuri Party's victory was Park's leadership. For this reason, the 2012 election was often dubbed the "return of the Queen of Election". The party's defeat in the populous Seoul metropolitan area in this election, however, revealed the limitation of Park's political influence.

=== 2012 presidential campaign ===
Park had been the leading candidate for the 2012 presidential election in every national poll in South Korea between 2008, when the Lee administration began, and September 2011, with an approval rating of 25% to 45%, more than twice that of the second candidate. Park's approval rating was highest during the 2008 general election, and lowest in early 2010 as a result of her political stance against the Lee administration in Sejong City issue. Park also benefited from a public image of standing aloofly above the fray of politics.

In September 2011, Ahn Cheol-soo, a former venture IT businessman and the Dean of Graduate School of Convergence Science and Technology at Seoul National University, emerged as a strong independent presidential candidate. In September 2011 national presidential polls, Ahn and Park closely competed for the status of frontrunner, with Park losing the top seat in some polls for the first time since 2008.

On 10 July 2012, Park formally announced her presidential bid at Time Square, Yeongdeungpo District, Seoul. In this event, she emphasized the right to pursue happiness, a democratic economy, and customized welfare services for the Korean people. In a national survey by Mono Research on 30 August Park was the top presidential candidate with an approval rating of 45.5% when competing with all potential candidates, and according to another recent national survey result had a higher approval rating (50.6%) than Ahn (43.9%) in a two-way competition as of 11 September . The opposing Democratic Party of Korea elected Moon Jae-in as its presidential candidate on 17 September, while Ahn announced his presidential bid on 19 September. Although still a leading candidate, Park had a lower approval rating than both Ahn and Moon when engaged in two-way competition, according to a 22 September national survey. Park was elected as president of the Republic of Korea on 19 December 2012, with the approval of 51.6% of Korean voters.

In 2017, the National Intelligence Service (NIS) admitted that it had conducted an illicit campaign to influence the 2012 presidential election, mobilizing teams of experts in psychological warfare to ensure that Park defeated Moon.

=== Positions ===
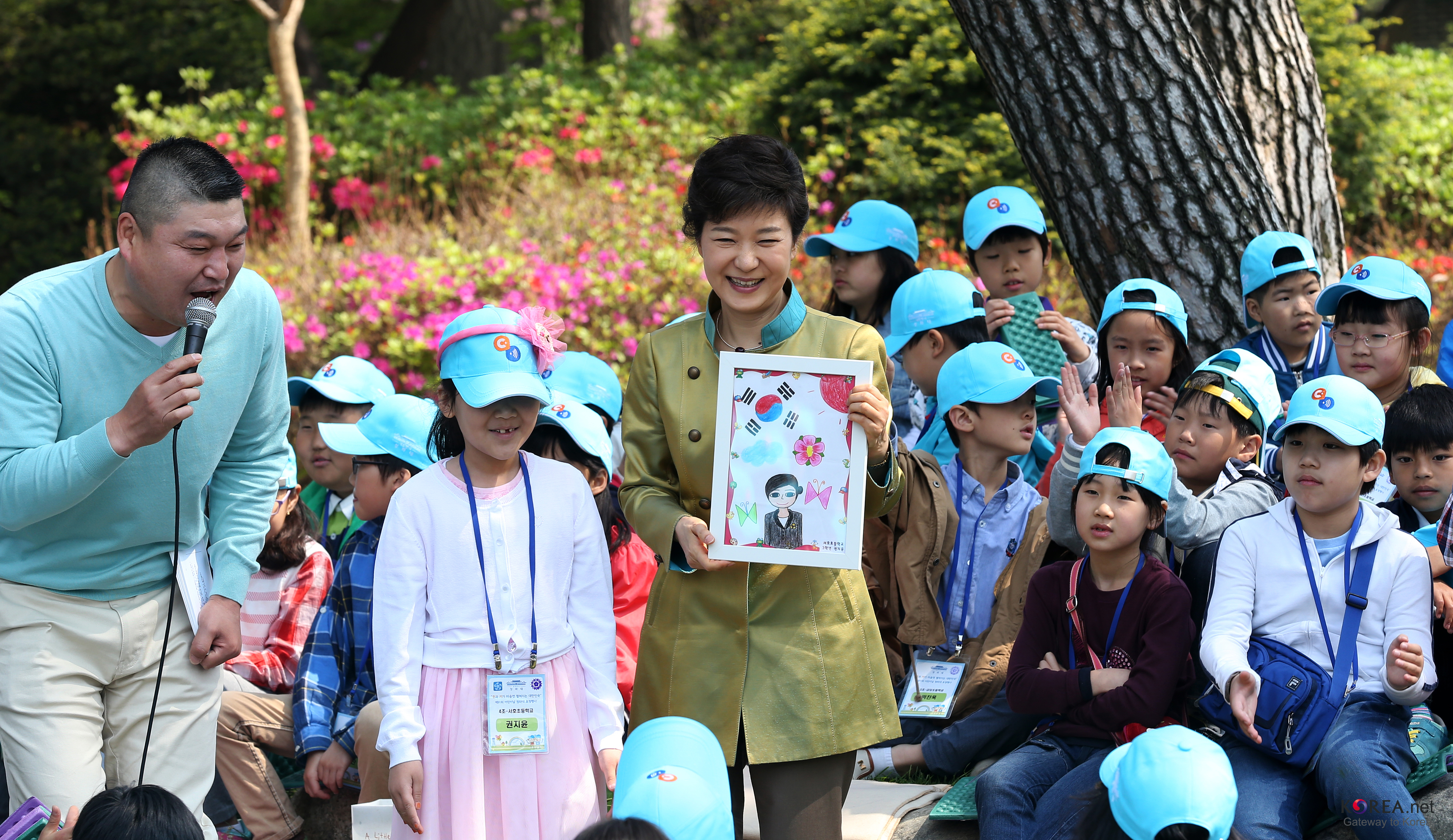
Park (center) smiles and shows a portrait drawn by a girl in Cheong Wa Dae, Seoul, at Children's Day 5 May 2013.

In a 2012 survey by Korean Research assessing the political stance of twelve potential presidential candidates of South Korea, Park was considered the most conservative candidate. Her conservative, market-oriented political stance was well reflected in her campaign pledge for 2008 presidential bid to cut taxes, reduce regulation, and establish strong law and order. Since 2009, however, Park started to focus more on welfare issues, advocating customized welfare services to the Korean people.

Park was well known for her strict adherence to political promises. In 2010, for example, she successfully stopped the Lee administration's attempt to cancel the plan to establish Sejong City, a new national center of administration, arguing that the plan was a promise made to the people. This conflict between Park and the Lee administration cost her a considerable decrease in her approval rating at the time. In 2012, Park also vowed to construct a new airport in the southeastern region, a 2008 presidential campaign promise made by GNP but cancelled in 2011, despite claims of economic infeasibility of the plan.

The administrative vision of Park's new government was "a new era of hope and happiness". The five Administrative Goals of the government were "a jobs-centered creative economy", "tailored employment and welfare", "creativity-oriented education and cultural enrichment", "a safe and united society" and "strong security measures for sustainable peace on the Korean Peninsula". The Park Geun-hye administration planned to create a trustworthy, clean, and capable government by carrying out these goals, related strategies, and tasks.

Park chose not to vote in the 2017 South Korean presidential election.

== Presidency (2013–2017) ==
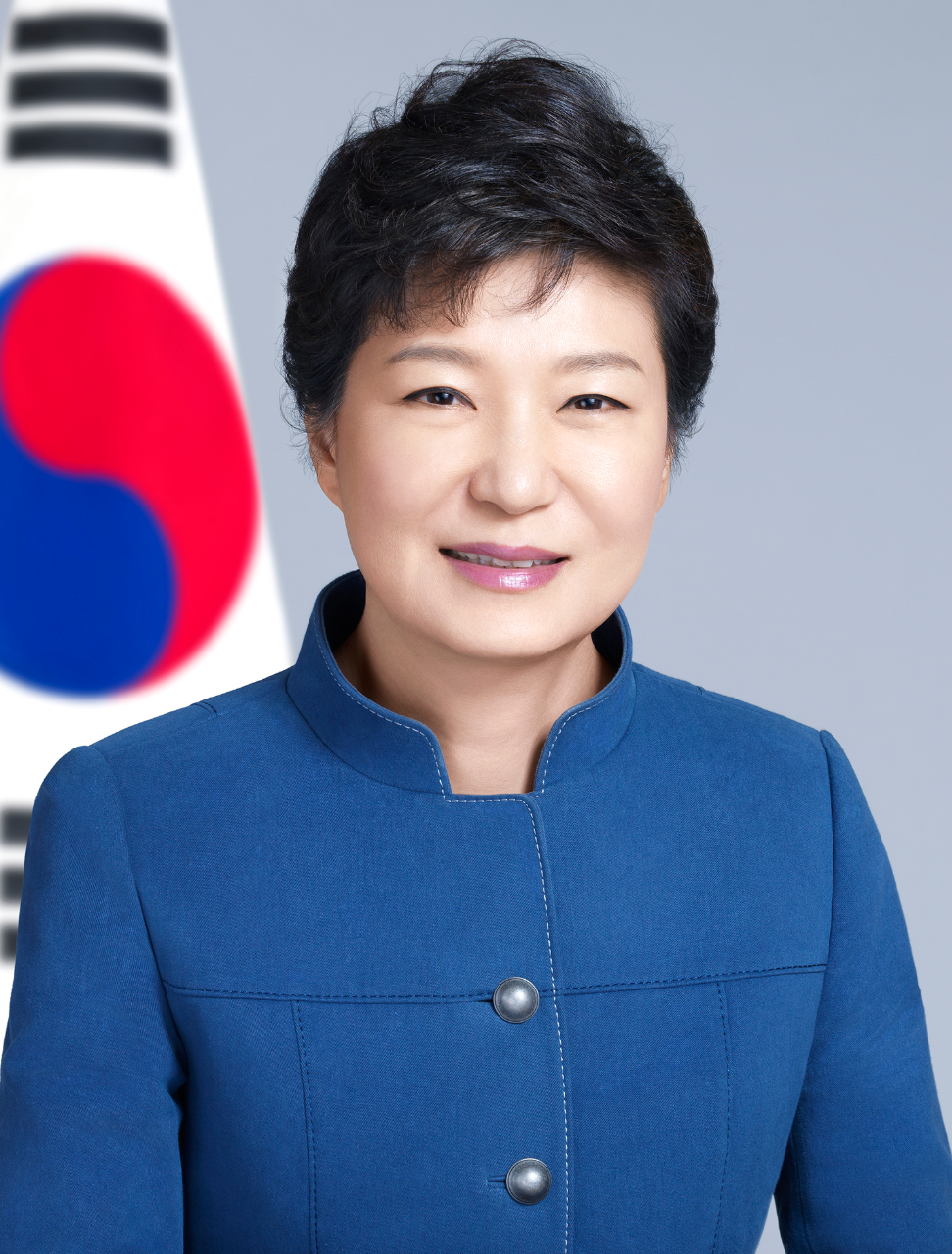
- Presidency of Park Geun-hye; Powers suspended from 9 December 2016 – 10 March 2017
- Presidency of Park Geun-hye; 25 February 2013 – 10 March 2017 (Removal)
- Prime Minister: Chung Hong-won; Lee Wan-koo; Choi Kyoung-hwan (acting); Hwang Kyo-ahn
- Cabinet: Full list
- Party: Saenuri
- Election: 2012
- Seat: Seoul

=== Inauguration ===
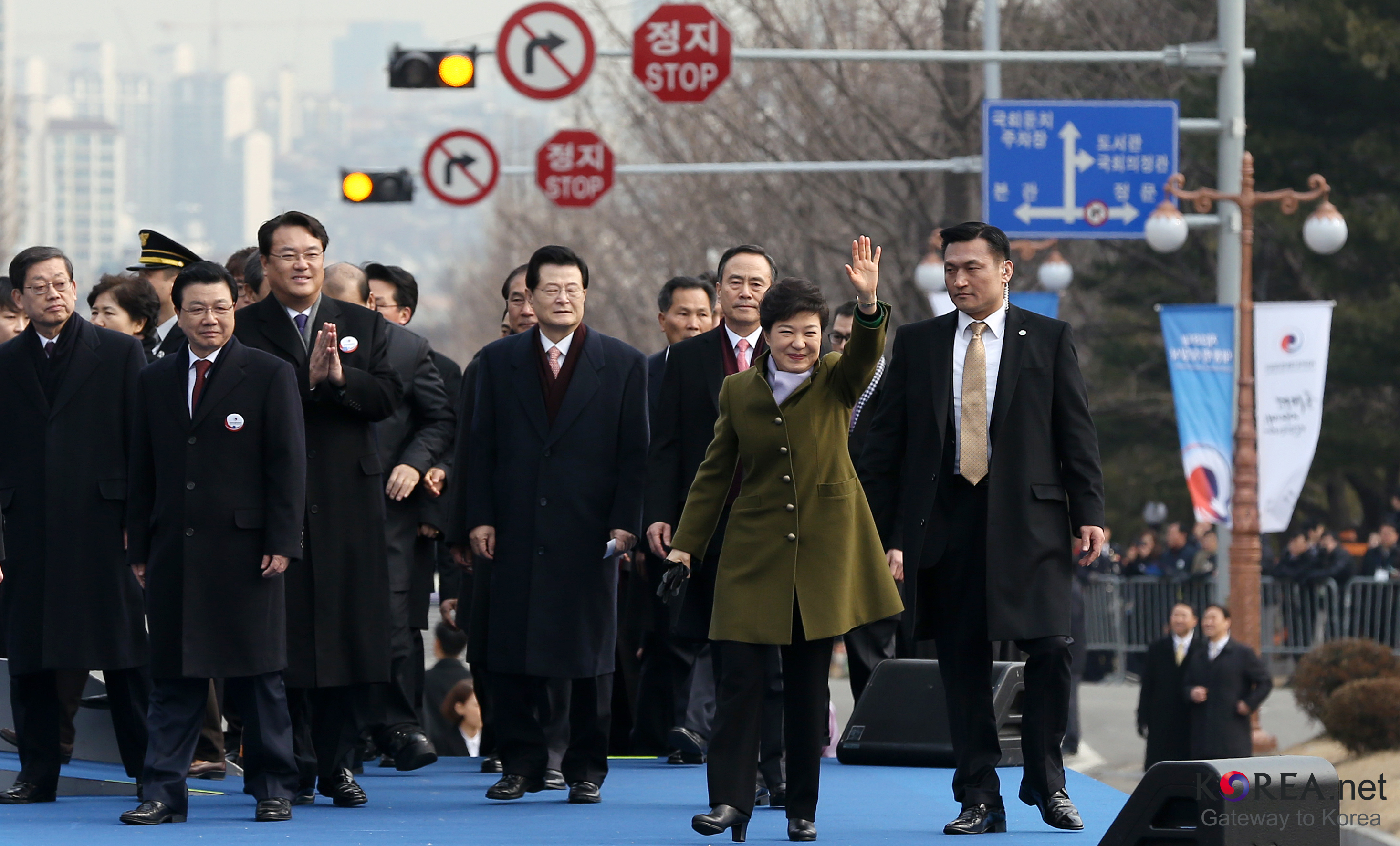
President Park on inauguration day, 25 February 2013

Park became the 11th president of South Korea on 25 February 2013. At midnight, she took over all presidential authorities including the prerogative of supreme command of South Korea's armed forces from her predecessor Lee Myung-bak. In her inauguration speech at the National Assembly building, Park spoke of her plan to open a new era of hope through "economic prosperity, people's happiness, and cultural enrichment". She particularly expressed her hope that North Korea would give up its nuclear arms and walk on the path of peace and mutual development, and declared that the foundation for a happy era of unification in which all Korean people will be able to enjoy prosperity and freedom and realize their dreams would be built through the Korean Peninsula Trust-building Process. In her inauguration speech, Park presented four guiding principles to realize her administrative vision: economic prosperity, people's happiness, cultural enrichment, and establishment of a foundation for peaceful unification. Park's inauguration ceremony was the largest one in South Korean history with 70,000 participants. Diplomatic representatives in Korea, as well as high-level delegates specially sent from 24 countries around the world including Thai Prime Minister Yingluck Shinawatra, U.S. National Security Advisor Thomas Donilon, Taiwanese Legislative Speaker Wang Jin-pyng, and former Japanese Prime Minister Yasuo Fukuda, also participated in the event to congratulate Park.

=== First year (February 2013 – February 2014) ===
The goal of the newly launched Park Geun-hye Administration for governing state affairs was to open "a new era of hope and happiness for all the people". Park avowed that South Korea would break away from its long-pursued development model that centered around the nation, and shift the focus of government administration from the state to individual citizens. The administration's keywords in managing state affairs were "people", "happiness", "trust", "co-prosperity" and "principle". Right after taking office, Park restructured the Blue House and government organization. The Office of National Security at the Blue House, Ministry of Science, ICT and Future Planning, and Ministry of Oceans and Fisheries were newly launched, and the seat of Deputy Prime Minister for Economic Affairs was revived. The Chief of the National Security Office would act as a "control tower" for diplomatic, security, and national defense issues, and the Deputy Prime Minister for Economic Affairs for economic, social, and welfare issues.

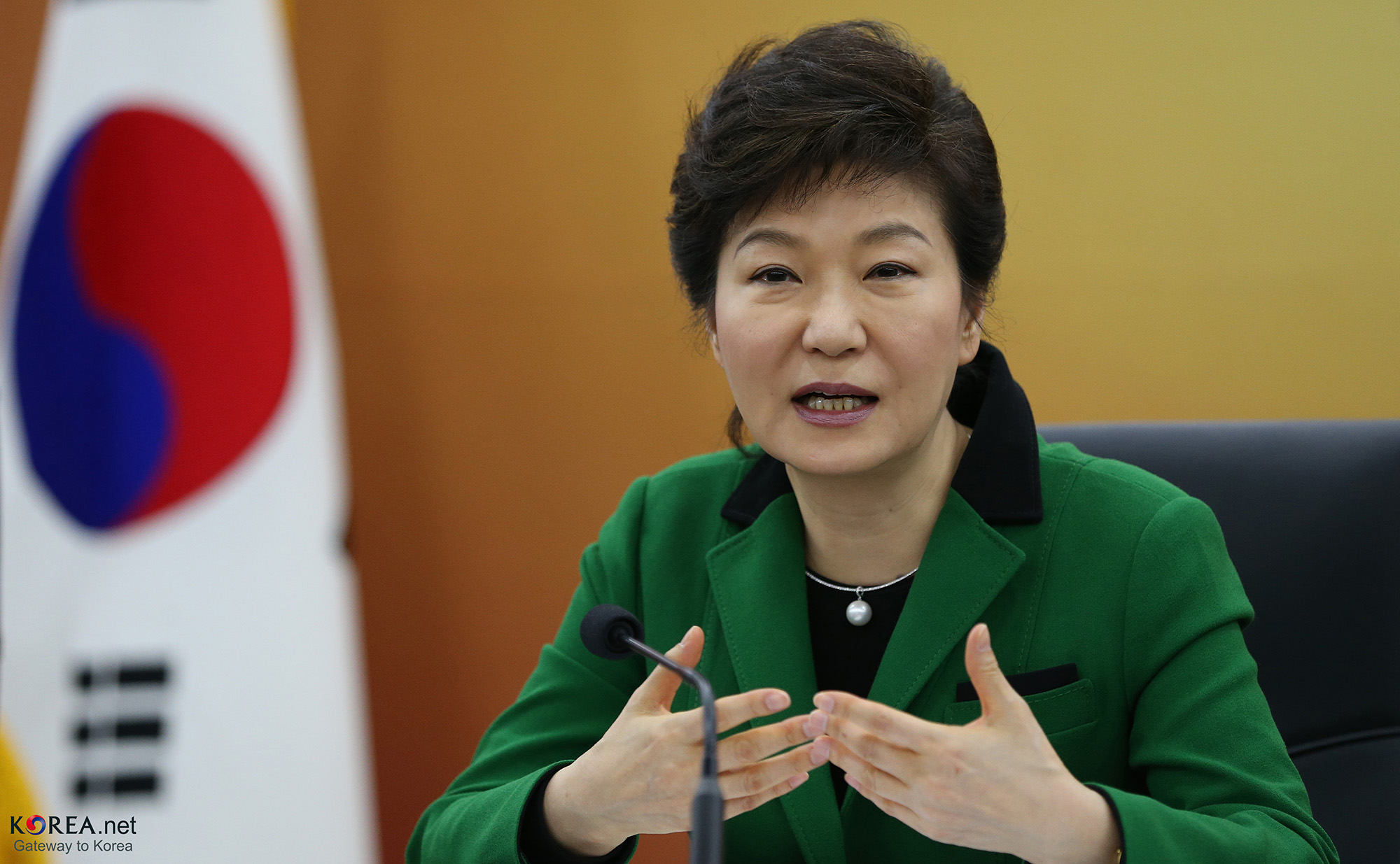
Park delivering the keynote speech during an economic policy meeting on 27 December 2013 at the Sejong Government Complex

Park announced her plan to build a "Creative Economy" on 5 June 2013, representing her vision for economic revival and job creation. In April, Park said "Timing is very important for our economic policy, jobs and livelihood mainly ordinary people should organize a supplementary budget in a timely manner." She encouraged the gig economy. On 8 April 2014, Park signed the Australia–Korea Free Trade Agreement with Australia's Prime Minister Tony Abbott.

Park proposed the eradication of "Four Major Social Evils" (사 대회악: "sa dae hwe ak") – sexual violence, domestic violence, school violence, and unsafe food. Statistics showed that sexual violence and domestic violence increased during these years. Without referring to statistical data, aggravating school violence or food safety is a public concern in South Korea. She also launched the National Unity Committee on 17 June with the purpose to advise the president in the process of resolving various conflicts in South Korean society and establishing a culture of co-existence and co-prosperity. Former Democratic United Party Advisor Han Kwang-ok was named as the head.

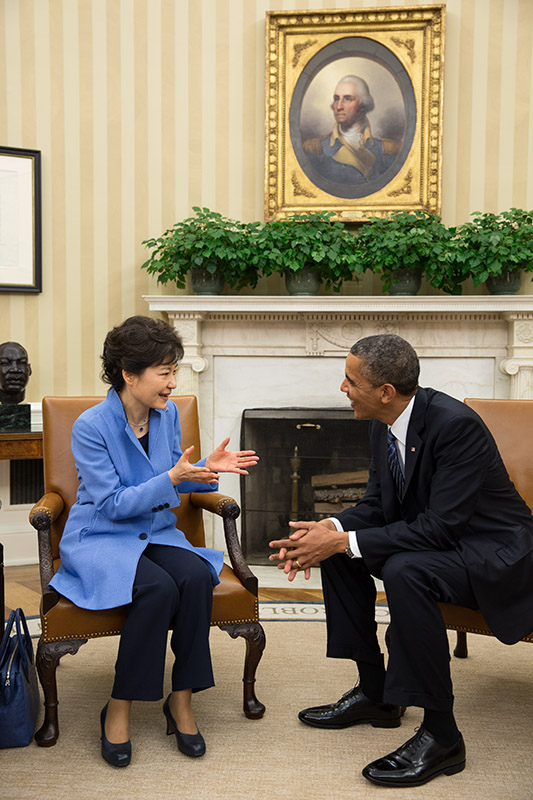
Park Geun-hye at a bilateral meeting with U.S. President Barack Obama on 7 May 2013

==== Foreign policy ====
After taking office, Park met with Secretary of State John Kerry and U.S. President Barack Obama. Park's trip to the United States in May 2013 was her first foreign trip after taking office. Like many of her predecessors, Park maintained a close relationship with the U.S., which has over 20,000 soldiers stationed in South Korea. During her visit to the U.S., she addressed a joint session of the U.S. Congress, where she called for a united front against any North Korean provocations. Park also called for a strong global relationship between South Korea and the United States.

Park visited the United States on her first overseas trip as president. She traveled to Washington, D.C., New York City, and Los Angeles on 5–9 May 2013. During summit talks at the White House, Presidents Park and Obama adopted a joint declaration for the American-South Korean alliance and discussed ways to further develop the bilateral relations in a future-forward manner. Also, the two leaders discussed ways to promote cooperation in building peace in the Northeast Asian region and strengthen the partnership between Seoul and Washington. The two leaders of South Korea and the United States agreed to adopt a joint statement on comprehensive energy cooperation to build a foundation for a future growth engine, and establish a policy cooperation committee on information and communication technology. In addition, Park urged her U.S. counterpart to expand the annual U.S. visa quota for South Korean professionals in order to promote co-development of both economies.

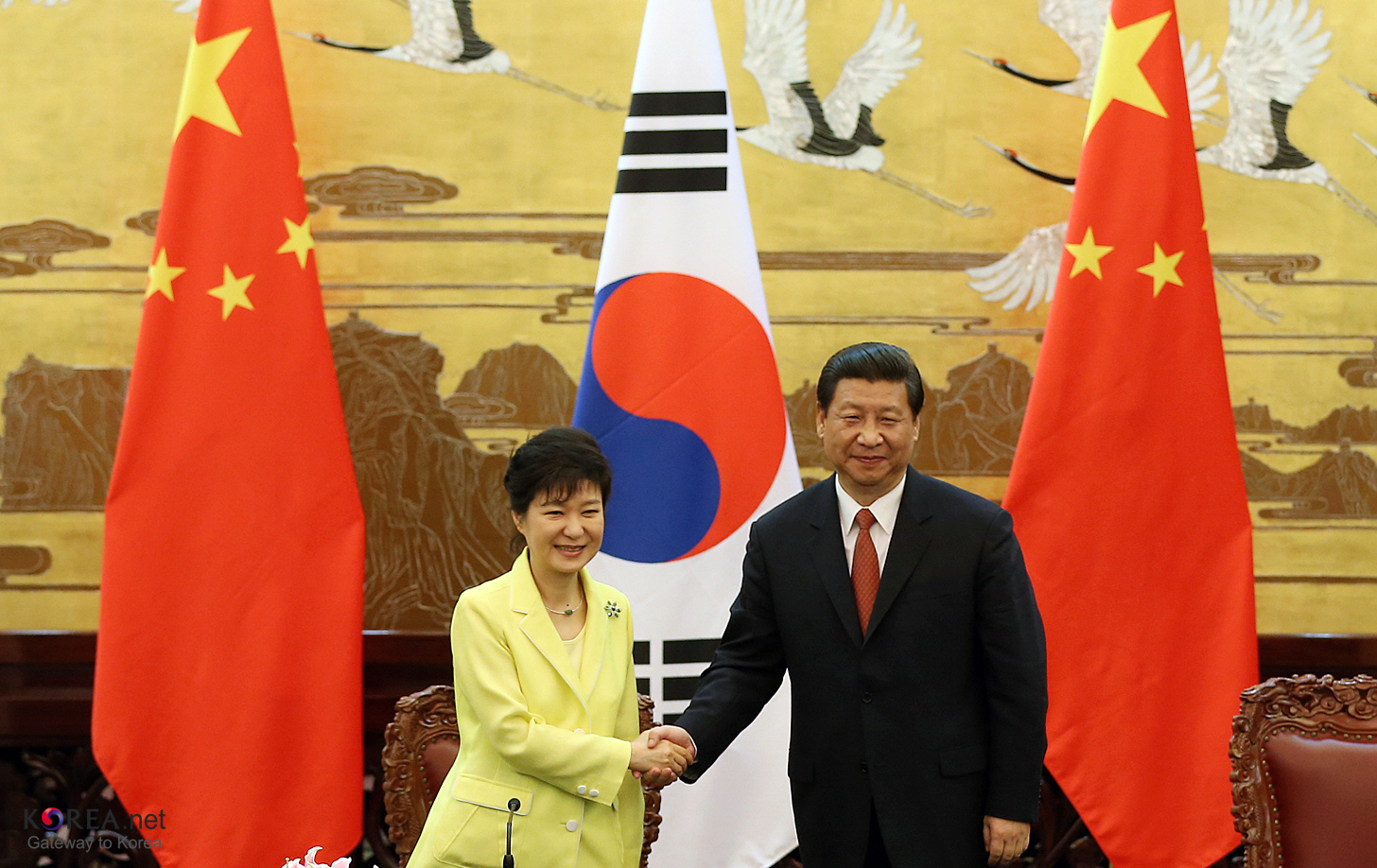
Park Geun-hye and Chinese President Xi Jinping, Beijing, 27 June 2013

On 27–30 June 2013, Park visited China with a South Korean delegation, where she met with Xi Jinping, the Chinese president. On 13 November 2013, Park held an extended meeting with President Vladimir Putin, whose visit to South Korea was the first among leaders of four major powers including the United States, China, and Japan. During the meeting, Park and Putin considered combining Korea's Eurasian Initiative and Russia's Asia-Pacific Policy. After the summit, both presidents issued a joint communique and held a joint press conference. Earlier, Park attended the G-20 Summit in September 2013 at St. Petersburg, where she met Putin for a separate dialogue discussing economic cooperation and seeking support on North Korean issues. It marked the first Korea–Russia summit talk since Park's inauguration. When Park met with Russian Minister for the Development of Russian Far East Viktor Ishaev, who headed the Russian delegation to Park's inaugural ceremony, she stated that Russia was one of Korea's key strategic partners.

===== North Korea =====
North Korea had engaged in provocations such as violating a UN Security Council resolution and firing a long-range missile on 12 December 2012, just before 19 December presidential election. After Park was elected, North Korea conducted its third nuclear test 12 February 2013, nullified the non-aggression agreements between the two countries on 8 March and withdrew North Korean workers from the Kaesong Industrial Region on 8 April. Park maintained her stance that South Korea will not succumb to the North's provocations and threats, and will endeavor to elicit policy coordination towards North Korea with major powers such as the United States, China and the UN. Her response to North Korean issues gained the support of many South Koreans and also the United States, China, and Russia, and played a significant role in the unanimous adoption by the UN Security Council of Resolution 2094 regarding North Korea on 7 March 2013. Due to Park's response and the international community's actions, on 6 June North Korea ceased provocations and threats towards the South and suggested holding discussions on reopening the Kaesong Industrial Complex. Park said that peace and unification on the Korean peninsula is the wish of all 70 million Koreans and that as president she will do her utmost to meet such a goal. As well, "the ultimate objective of reunification efforts is to improve the quality of life of people in both Koreas, to further expand freedom and human rights, and [from there] build a prosperous Korean Peninsula." She later stated, "to open a new era of peace and hope on the peninsula, North Korea needs to accept her administration's trust-building policy initiative".

Park's policy vision and initiative on issues concerning North Korea and unification are reflected in her Korean Peninsula Trust-building Process. The Ministry of Unification announced a new vision statement "realizing a new unified Korea that ensures everyone's happiness". The administrative tasks for this cause include normalizing inter-Korean relations through a trust-building process, embarking on small-scale unification projects that will lead to a complete integration of the two Koreas, and taking practical measures to prepare for unification by strengthening unification capabilities. According to Park, peaceful unification will be achieved in a three-stage unification initiative: starting from securing peace, going through economic integration, and finally reaching political integration. To achieve sustainable peace by the initiative, the new administration will offer humanitarian assistance for the people in North Korea, inter-Korean exchange and cooperation in economic, social, and cultural areas, and will apply 'Vision Korea project' for establishing a single economic community in the Korean Peninsula, conditioned on sufficient mutual trust and progress in denuclearizing North Korea.

=== Second year (February 2014 – February 2015) ===
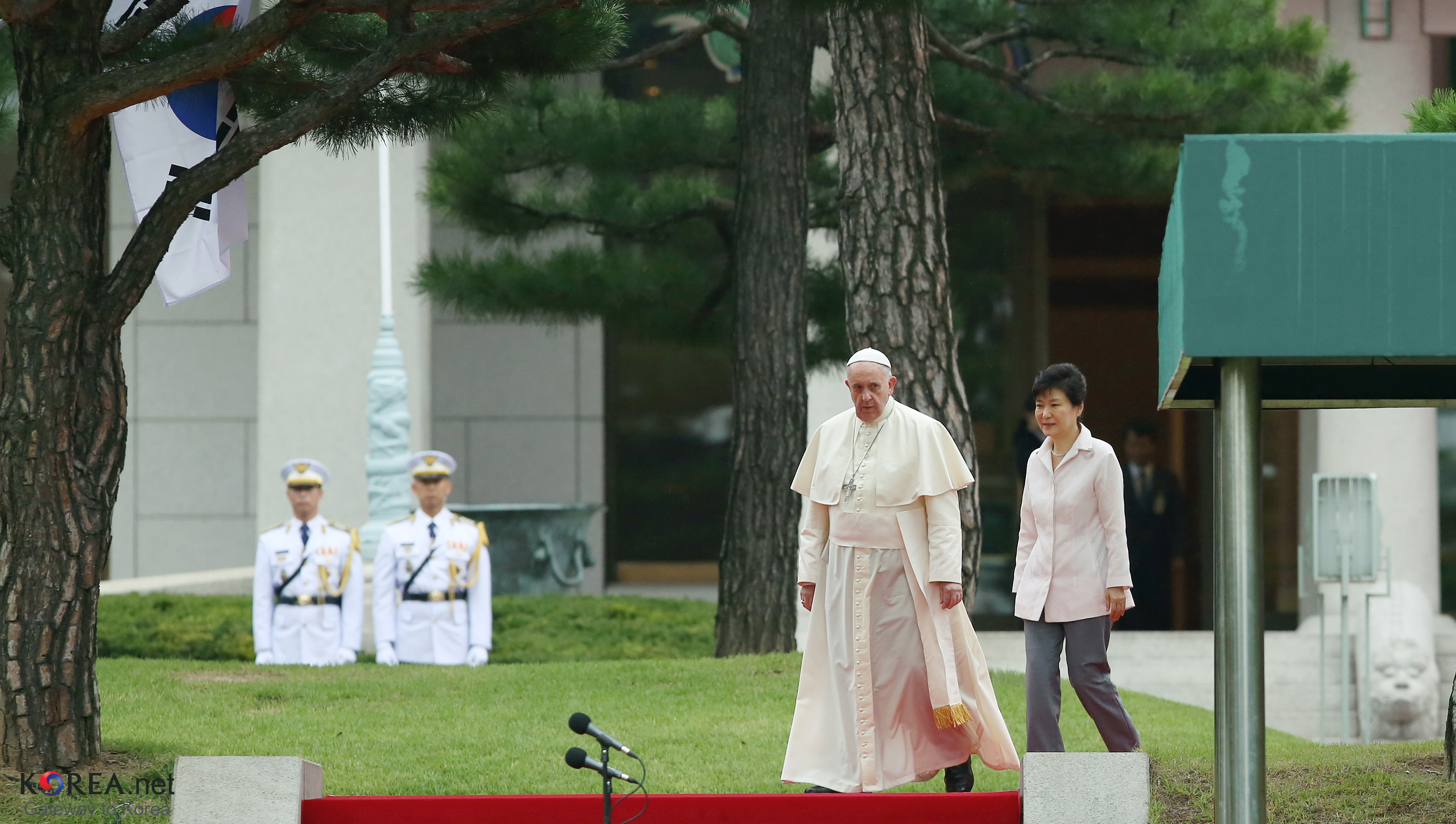
Park Geun-hye and Pope Francis, 14 August 2014

Park proposed three steps to North Korea to help move toward the reunification of the Korean Peninsula, on 28 March in Dresden, during her state visit to Germany. She stated that "Starting with jointly managing rivers and forests running through the two Koreas, we need to expand joint projects that benefit both sides. In that respect, I hope North Korea will attend the UN Convention on Biological Diversity conference to be held in South Korean city of Pyeongchang in October." In May 2014, Park warned that a new nuclear test by North Korea could lead to "a nuclear domino effect", that might provide its neighbors with a pretext to arm themselves with nuclear weapons.

On 18 May 2014, Park announced South Korea's "plans to break up its coastguard" after failing to respond well during the MV Sewol ferry disaster. According to Park, "investigation and information roles would be transferred to the South Korea National Police while the rescue and salvage operation and ocean security roles would be transferred to the Department for National Safety, not to be confused with the Korean Ministry of Security and Public Administration, which will be newly established". On 19 November 2014, the Korea Coast Guard and National Emergency Management Agency ceased control as the Ministry of Public Safety and Security was founded at the same day.

=== Third year (February 2015 – February 2016) ===
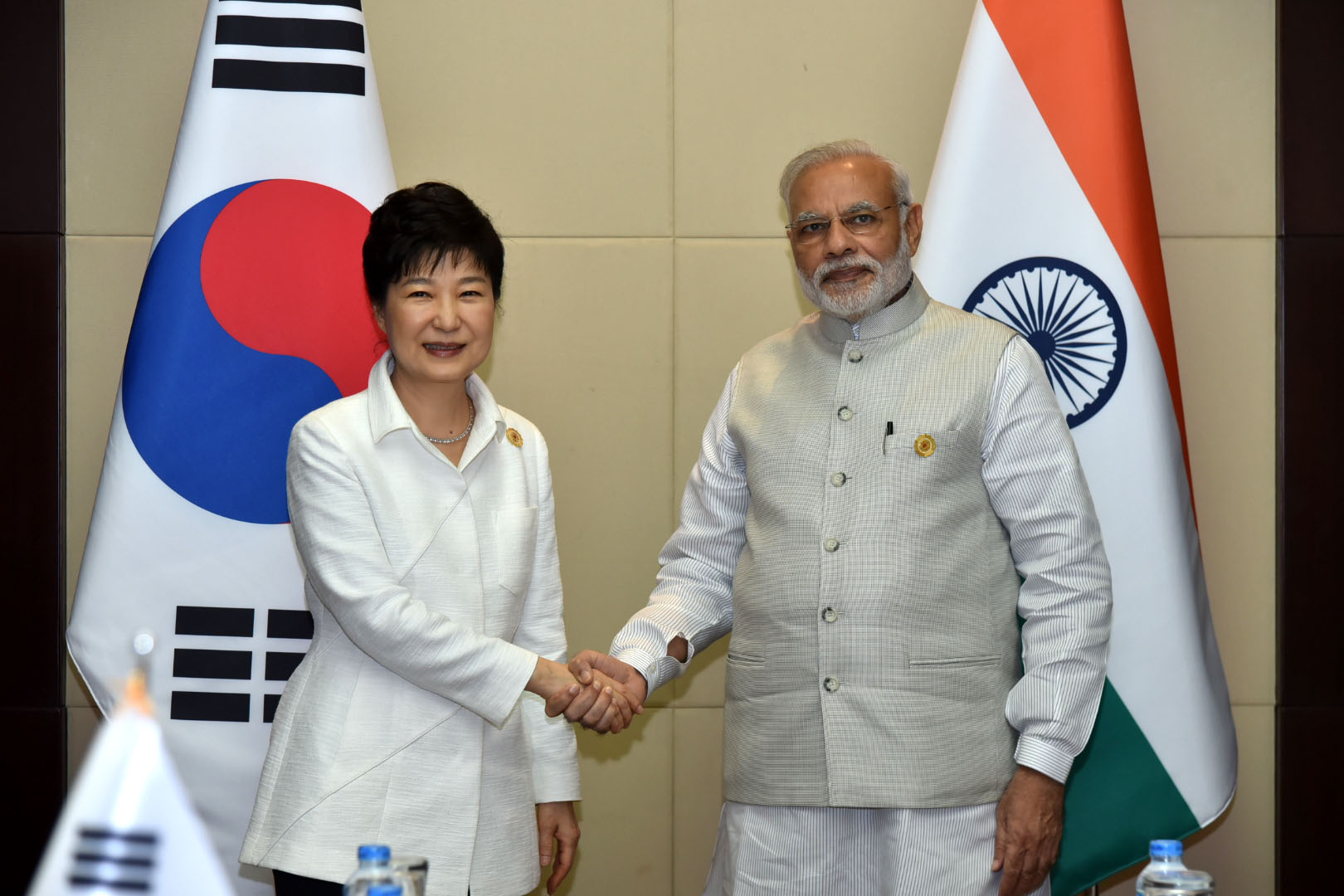
Park meeting Indian Prime Minister Narendra Modi on the sidelines of the 14th ASEAN-India Summit

On 26 May 2015, Park urged the head of the Asian Development Bank to cooperate with South Korea and the China-led Asian Infrastructure Investment Bank after South Korea had officially applied to join the Chinese-led Asian Infrastructure Investment Bank in late March 2015.

=== Fourth and final year (February 2016 – March 2017) ===
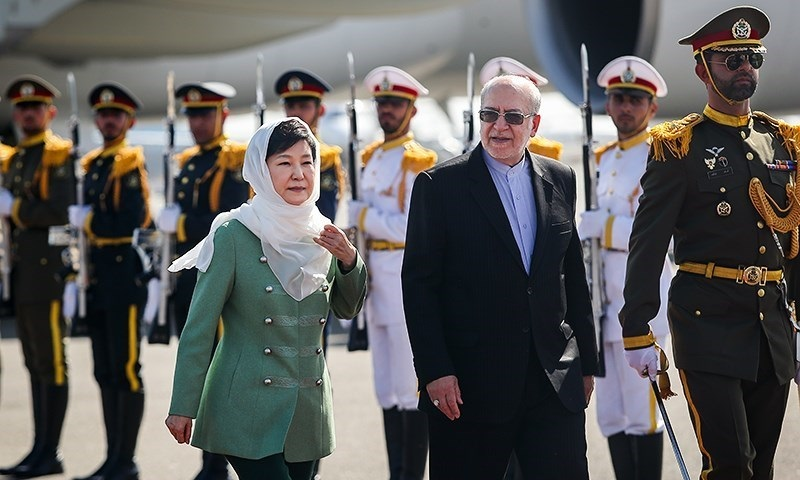
Park Geun-hye being welcomed by Iran's business minister, Mohammad Reza Nematzadeh in Mehrabad Airport

On 1 May 2016, Park became the first South Korean president to visit Iran. She was at the head of a 236-member delegation of businessmen and entrepreneurs during a three-day visit to Tehran to discuss bilateral trade and other matters of mutual interest. She met Iranian President Hassan Rouhani and held talks with Supreme Leader Ali Khamenei. The two countries also signed 19 basic agreements to expand mutual cooperation over a variety of areas. Earlier, Iran's President Rouhani emphasized that Iran and South Korea were set to boost their trade volume from the current $6 billion to $18 billion.

==== 2016 general elections ====
Park suffered a serious setback in the 2016 general elections on 13 April 2016, as the Saenuri Party lost both its majority and its status as first party in the National Assembly. Park had been criticized for her involvement in the elections and the party's nomination process, and other Saenuri members blamed the pro-Park faction in the party for the defeat. Park loyalists fared badly in constituency elections. The result was seen to hinder the chances of Park's passing her proposed economic reforms, and in the aftermath of the results the conservative The Chosun Ilbo stated that Park's "lame duck period has started earlier than any other administration in the past".

=== Approval ratings ===
Park Geun-hye's Presidential Job Approval Rating

Approval ratings by age

In July 2013, public support for Park's method of governing state affairs reached up to 63 percent, higher than the percentage of the votes she had won in the presidential election, which was 52 percent. The Korean media suggested that such a high level of support came from Park's principled North Korea policy, constructive outcomes from visits to the United States and China, and distancing from internal political disputes.

By January 2015, Park's approval rating had fallen to 30 percent, partly due to the sinking of MV Sewol and disputes with North Korea. By September 2015, Park's approval had increased to 54 percent due to her diplomacy that defused a military standoff with North Korea, but in the aftermath of her party's 2016 election loss, her ratings fell to 31.5 percent, plunging 8.1 percentage points compared to the week before the election.

On 4 November 2016, Park's ratings fell to 4–5% as details of her relationship with Choi Soon-sil were investigated and exposed in what became the 2016 South Korean political scandal.

== Arrest, detention, pardon and post-presidency (2017–present) ==
Immediate response to the decision of the Constitutional Court of Korea on 10 March 2017

Park was arrested on 31 March 2017, and held in pre-trial detention at the Seoul Detention Center in Uiwang, Gyeonggi Province. On 17 April 2017, Park was formally charged with abuse of power, bribery, coercion and leaking government secrets. Park denied the charges during five rounds of interrogation while in prison.

Prosecutors sought a 30-year prison term for Park, along with a fine of ₩188.5 billion (US$110,579,397). On 6 April 2018, a three-judge panel of the Central District Court in Seoul sentenced Park to 24 years in prison and a fine of ₩18 billion (US$16,798,683), finding her guilty of 16 out of 18 charges brought before her. In June 2018, three former NIS directors (Lee Byung-kee, Lee Byung-ho, and Nam Jae-joon) who served in the Park administration were found guilty of bribery, related to the 2016 Park Geun-hye scandals. They illegally transferred money from the NIS budget to Park's presidential office. This illegally obtained money was used by Park and her associates for private use and to pay bribes. On 24 August 2018, Park's sentence was increased to 25 years in prison.

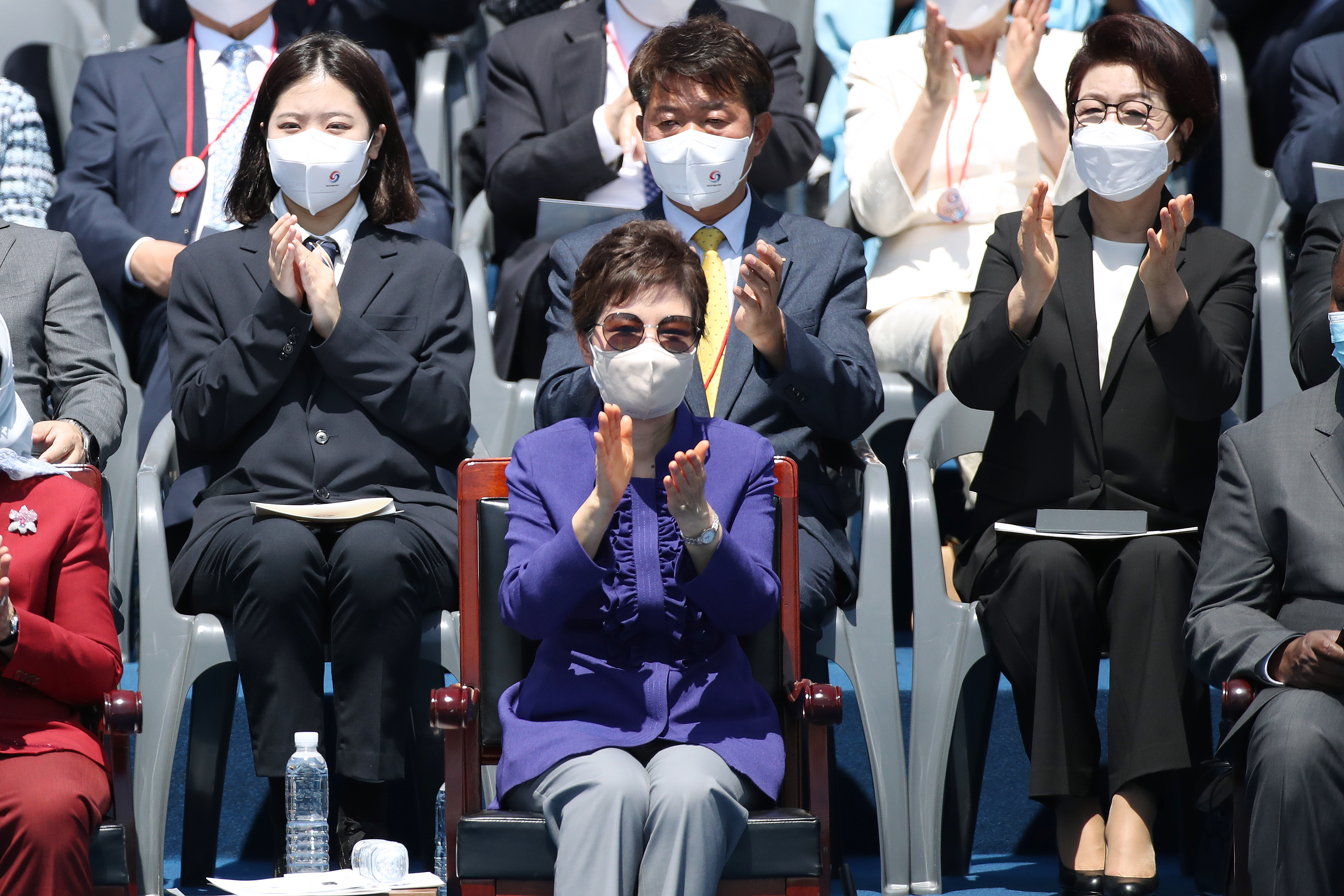
Park Geun-hye (in purple) at the inauguration of President Yoon Suk Yeol, May 2022. Seated at the right is former First Lady Kim Yoon-ok.

In July 2020, an appellate court reduced Park's prison sentence to 20 years after a retrial, taking into account that she "received little personal benefit" from her offences, and Park was also cleared of charges of alleged extortion from conglomerates paying donations to foundations of Choi Soon-sil. In January 2021, South Korea's top court upheld the 20-year prison sentence, bringing an end to the legal process.

On 24 December 2021, it was announced that Park would receive a pardon from South Korean President Moon Jae-in. In his pardon, President Moon cited Park's deteriorating health and the needs to "overcome unfortunate past history and promote national unity" as reasons for the pardon. On 31 December, she was released from prison, returning home three months later on 24 March 2022. New President Yoon Suk-yeol invited Park to his inauguration ceremony on 10 May 2022.

In January 2026, Park made a rare public appearance by visiting the National Assembly for the first time since her impeachment. On 22 January, she met with Jang Dong-hyeok, the leader of the conservative People Power Party, who was on the eighth day of a hunger strike. Jang had been fasting to demand a special counsel investigation into allegations involving the Unification Church and election nomination bribes. Expressing concern that prolonged fasting would severely damage his health, Park urged him to end the protest. Following their meeting, Jang halted his hunger strike. Political analysts viewed Park's high-profile visit as a significant move to consolidate conservative voters ahead of the upcoming local elections.

In May 2026, Park made a prominent return to the political stage ahead of the nationwide local elections. On 23 May 2026, she visited Chilseong Market in Daegu to support Choo Kyung-ho, the People Power Party candidate for Daegu mayor. This marked her first official appearance on a campaign trail since her impeachment in 2017. During her 30-minute visit, she greeted local merchants and citizens, stating that she wished to offer comfort amid difficult economic conditions. Following her Daegu visit, she scheduled further campaign stops to support conservative candidates in Daejeon and North Chungcheong Province.

On 26 May 2026, Park made a high-profile campaign appearance in Busan to support the People Power Party ahead of the local elections. She held a joint rally at a traditional market alongside PPP mayoral candidate Park Heong-joon, urging conservative voters to rally together and secure victory in the city.

== Controversies and issues ==
=== Parentage controversy ===
Park had been often criticized for being the "daughter of a dictator" (Park Chung Hee) and by supporters of Lee Myung-bak for not actively supporting the Lee administration. A national-level poll conducted in July 2012 by a conservative newspaper reported that 59% of participants responded they did not believe Park was a "daughter of a dictator" while 36% agreed with the characterization. Park Chung Hee's status as a dictator became a contested topic after the 1997 Asian financial crisis. GNP party elites saw this as their chance to revitalize Park Chung Hee's image, focusing on South Korea's economic growth during his administration, thus steadily changing his public perception.

During a 2012 interview with the Cheongju broadcast station CJB, Park commented regarding her stance that her father's May 16 coup was a "revolution to save the country" by stating, "I don't think it's the place of politicians to be fighting over whether [the events of 1961] were a 'coup d'etat' or a 'revolution'." In a July 2012 survey, 50% of respondents answered that they disagreed with Park's assessment that her father's 1961 coup was "unavoidable, the best possible choice, and an advisable decision", as opposed to 37% that agreed. From another survey conducted in July 2012, 42% of respondents agreed with her opinion that her father's 1961 coup was "unavoidable", while 46% disagreed.

Because Park inherited strong regional and generational support from her father, as well as the legacy of his economic success, Park's opponents used her father as criticism against her.

=== Bu-il foundation accusations ===
Park has faced much scrutiny over an educational foundation, Jeongsoo Scholarship Foundation, formerly known as Buil (in reference to the stock it controls in the newspaper "Busan Ilbo"), which her father, and later she, headed. Its original owners claimed in court they were forced to turn it over to her father.

=== Party criticism ===
Liberty Korea Party assemblyman Nam Kyung-pil criticized the Park-centered nature of the party, regarding its preparation for the 2012 presidential election, and stated, "If we keep seeing the same situation where Park Geun-hye gives a press conference before a general meeting of lawmakers is held, and what she says then gets decided on as the party's position, then the public is going to think democracy has disappeared from the party."

Furthermore, some have said Park's behavior in the lead-up to 2012 presidential election was a mixture of trend-following and corner-cutting—a stark contrast with the vehement insistence on the principle that she showed when she opposed a revision of the plan for a multifunctional administrative city in Sejong City. For instance, Yim Tae-hee, another presidential candidate of the party, pointed to Park's voting down of a motion to arrest Chung Doo-un, a lawmaker implicated with bribery related to saving banks. Another candidate, Ahn Sang-soo, accused Park of "saying one thing yesterday and another today".

=== Spokesman scandal ===
Park fired Yoon Chang-jung, a Blue House spokesman who was alleged by Washington Police to have committed sexual assault against a young woman hired as an intern at the South Korean Embassy in Washington during Park's first visit to the United States.

=== Election-meddling scandal ===
Just a week before the presidential election date, the opposing party alleged that the public servants from National Intelligence Service (NIS) had organized to promote Park's election campaign by way of posting online articles favorable to Park and slanderous to the opposing candidates. This political behavior by public servants is strictly prohibited by the Korean Constitution. To prove their allegation, the opposing Democratic Party, along with the police and Central Election Assistance Commission. From there, the 29-year-old female agent, later known as Ha-Young Kim, who was running an illegal online election campaign operation such as spreading slanderous postings about the opposing candidate had locked herself in. The police could not force to enter the house and the standoff lasted for three days, provoking a tense political standoff. The opposition accused the intelligence service of blocking an investigation. Park and her party accused the opposition of harassing the woman. Park even said the standoff of the self-lock-in was a violation of a female right in the presidential candidate debate that took place three days before the election.

Later that night of the presidential debate, Kim Yong-pan, then the chief of Seoul Metropolitan Police Agency, publicly announced there was no evidence of illegal online postings from the collected laptop of the female agent. This announcement, which took place three days before the election, was believed to have significantly affected the outcome of the presidential election according to the opposing party. After months of probes into the alleged election meddling, the prosecution concluded in mid-June 2013 that Won Sei-hoon, then NIS chief who headed the intelligence agency for around four years under former President Lee Myung-bak, ordered agents to conduct an online smear campaign against opposition presidential candidates. The special investigation drew a conclusion that the agents systemically intervened in domestic politics by writing thousands of postings on politics in cyberspace through hundreds of different user IDs. Kim Yong-pan, then chief of the Seoul Metropolitan Police Agency (SMPA), was prosecuted without physical detention on charges of abusing his authority to hamper police investigation into the case. CCTV conversation between the computer analysts who were analyzing the laptop at police revealed that the police already knew there were illegal online postings against the opposing party's candidates, but the chief of SMPA publicly announced otherwise, an announcement that indicates intentional meddling into the presidential election.

The investigation and the trial at court are on-going, and Park faces a political blow. However, the leading Saenuri party along with government leaders has attempted to dodge its political fall-out. Their effort has involved tipping a rumor to a major conservative media, Chosun Ilbo, about an extramarital child of the Chae Dong-wook, former Prosecutor General, who has approved the prosecution of Won Se-hoon and Kim Yong-pan, which eventually led to his resignation. Yoon Suk-ryul, the director of the special investigation team, which was leading the probe into the election meddling, was fired and returned to his original position, head of Yeoju branch Supreme Prosecutors Office. The investigation of his team has further revealed that the NIS is suspected of having posted 55,689 messages on Twitter for three months until the presidential election.

Whether or not the election meddling of the NIS by way of online posts has actually affected the outcome of the presidential election is controversial. However, the false announcement by Kim Yong-pan, then chief of the SMPA, has appeared to do so. Had the police announced honestly, 14% of the electorate who voted for Park said they would have voted for Moon Jae-In, the first runner-up of the election.

=== Lack of communication ===
Park has been criticized for holding press conferences with questions and answers submitted in advance. By 11 January 2015, she had held four press conferences since taking office in February 2013. Among the four press conferences, three of them were public speeches without questions and answers. Even in the remaining press conference, the questions were submitted in advance, and she read prepared answers. Her opponents labeled her as "No communication" (불통; Bultong).

=== November 2015 protests ===
On 15 November 2015, around 80,000 anti-government protesters clashed with government forces on the streets of Seoul, demanding that Park step down, with many of the protesters chanting "Park Geun-hye, step down". The rally was triggered by Park's adopting business-friendly labour policies and a decision to require middle and high schools to use only state-issued history textbooks in classes starting in 2017, combined with plans to make labour markets more flexible by giving employers more leeway in dismissing workers. Security forces fired tear gas and sprayed water cannons into the crowd when protesters attempted to break through police barricades.

=== Censorship ===
In the wake of the April 2014 capsizing of the Sewol ferry, public outcry arose over the government's handling of the situation. In response, the Park administration established a commission to monitor and prosecute social media critics of Park. Tatsuya Kato, a Japanese journalist who was a Seoul Bureau chief of South Korea at Sankei Shimbun, was indicted on charges of defamation for reporting the relationship between Park and Choi Soon-sil's husband, Chung Yoon-hoi, by the Supreme Prosecutors' Office of the Republic of Korea after the MV Sewol sank.

=== Public Official Election Act ===
On 25 June 2015, Park said that "Betrayal which breaks the trust shouldn't be accepted in politics and this should be punished by election with people's own hands". This mention was aimed to Yu Seungmin who was a member of Saenuri Party. Her statement was criticized by professor Jo Guk and politician Moon Jae-in because it was intended to affect Yu's election, which is forbidden by the Public Official Election Act. However, the National Election Commission decided not to treat Park's mention as a violation of the Act.

=== Comfort Women agreement ===
In 2015, Park reached an agreement with Japanese Prime Minister Shinzo Abe regarding the comfort women issue. Japan apologized to former comfort women and provided 1 billion yen ($8.8 million) towards an assistance fund as terms of the agreement. The two governments agreed that the issue would be "irreversibly resolved". However, in 2017, Park's successor, President Moon Jae-in, stated that the deal was seriously flawed and unilaterally terminated it.

=== Choi Soon-sil scandal and impeachment ===
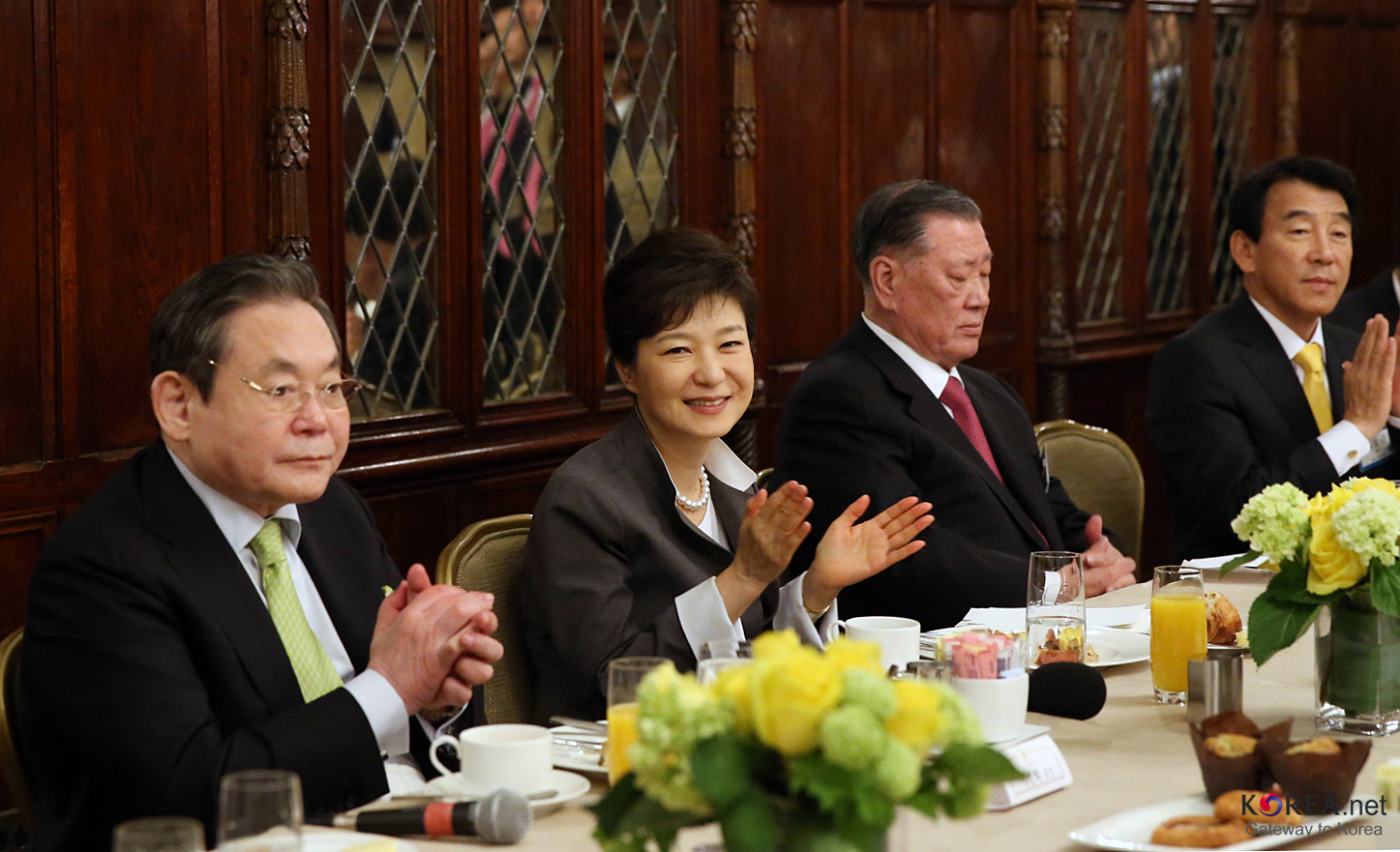
Park Geun-hye at a breakfast meeting with chaebol business magnates Lee Kun-hee and Chung Mong-koo

In October 2016, investigations into Park's relationship with Choi Soon-sil, daughter of the late Church of Eternal Life cult leader and Park's mentor Choi Tae-min, began. Several news media including JTBC and the Hankyoreh reported that Choi, who has no official government position, had access to confidential documents and information for the president, and acted as a close confidant for the president. Choi and Park's senior staff including both Ahn Jong-bum and Jeong Ho-sung used their influence to extort ₩77.4 billion (approximately $75 million) from Korean chaebols—family-owned large business conglomerates—and set up two culture and sports-related foundations, Mir and K-sports foundations. Choi was also accused of having influenced Ewha Womans University to change their admission criteria in order for her daughter Chung Yoo-ra to be given a place there. Ahn Jong-bum and Jeong Ho-sung, top presidential aides, were arrested for abuse of power and helping Choi; they denied wrongdoing and claimed that they were simply following President Park's orders. Choi was also alleged to have used a South Korean overseas development assistance project (a convention center in Myanmar) for improper personal benefits.

On 25 October 2016, Park publicly acknowledged her close ties with Choi. On 28 October, Park dismissed key members of her top office staff while her approval ratings fell to 4%. Her approval rating ranged from 1 to 3% for Korean citizens under 60 years of age, while it remained higher, at 13%, for the over-60 age group. It was the worst approval rating in Korean history and is worse than the 6% approval rating of former President Kim Young-sam, who was widely blamed for forcing the Korean economy into the 1997 Asian financial crisis. The controversy led to mass protests and rallies in October and November 2016 calling for her resignation. On 12 November, more than one million citizens participated in the protests at Gwanghwamun Square close to the presidential residence demanding Park's resignation or impeachment. On 19 November, another 1 million people participated in the national protest after Park refused to help in the investigation.

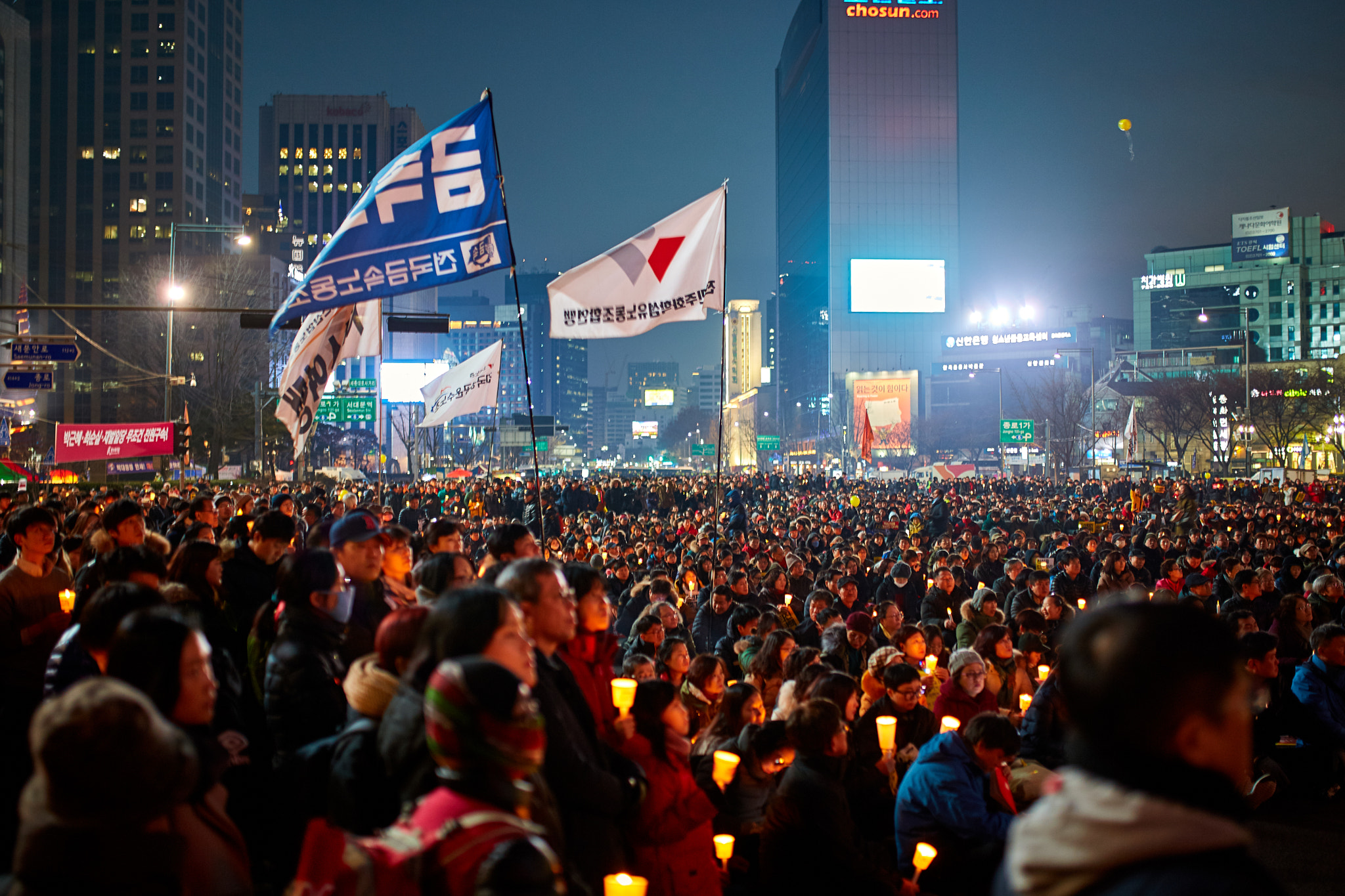
Candlelight protest against Park Geun-hye in Seoul, 7 January 2017

Park then fired a number of her cabinet members and the prime minister. In particular, the sacking of the prime minister, Hwang Kyo-ahn, resulted in controversy, due to the claim that his firing was carried out via a text message. The Supreme Prosecutors' Office of Korea (SPO), in laying charges against Choi and two former presidential aides, alleged that Park colluded with the three in certain criminal activities. The president would be questioned by prosecutors, the first time this has occurred with a serving South Korean president. Following the scandal, there was a series of massive demonstrations that started in the first week of November 2016. On 29 November 2016, Park offered to resign as president, and invited the National Assembly to arrange a transfer of power. The opposition parties rejected the offer, accusing Park of attempting to avoid the process of impeachment.

The National Assembly instead filed a motion for impeachment, which was put to a vote on 9 December 2016 and passed with 234 supporters. Due to the ratification of her impeachment proposal, her presidential powers and duties were suspended, and Prime Minister Hwang Kyo-ahn assumed those powers and duties as acting president. Park was finally ousted from office by the Constitutional Court on 10 March 2017. The decision was unanimous, 8–0 in favour of the impeachment, as announced shortly thereafter. On 26 March 2017, South Korean prosecutors announced they were seeking an arrest warrant against Park. This warrant was granted by the Seoul Central District Court on 31 March 2017, and Park was arrested later that day, and was later sentenced to 25 years in prison.

=== Pardon ===
In December 2021, the government of President Moon Jae-in decided to issue Park a pardon. The Justice Ministry said the reason for doing so was to promote reconciliation and consolidate national power to help overcome the national crisis caused by the COVID-19 pandemic. Moon also said Park's declining health had played a role in the decision. Park was pardoned under a broad amnesty that benefited 700 other prisoners, whose remaining prison terms would be eradicated or cut in half. She arrived home in March 2022 after having been hospitalized at Samsung Medical Center.

== Honours ==
- South Korea:
  - Recipient of the Grand Order of Mugunghwa

=== Foreign honours ===
- Austria:
  - Grand Star of the Decoration of Honour for Services to the Republic of Austria
- Peru
  - Grand Cross of Order of the Sun of Peru
- United Kingdom:
  - Honorary Dame Grand Cross of the Order of the Bath (GCB, 2013)

== Electoral history ==
=== National Assembly races (1998 to present) ===
==== 1998 ====
15th National Assembly of the Republic of Korea elections, 1998 by-election, Dalseong, Daegu
Party	Candidate	Votes	%
Grand National	Park Geun-hye	28,937	62.50
National Congress	Eom Sam-tak	16,355	37.49
Total votes		45,292	100
Grand National hold			

==== 2000 ====
16th National Assembly of the Republic of Korea elections, 2000, Dalseong, Daegu
Party	Candidate	Votes	%
Grand National	Park Geun-hye	37,805	61.39
Millennium Democratic	Eom Sam-tak	23,744	38.60
Total votes		62,738	100
Grand National hold			

==== 2004 ====
17th National Assembly of the Republic of Korea elections, 2004, Dalseong, Daegu
Party	Candidate	Votes	%
Grand National	Park Geun-hye	45,298	70.03
Uri	Yun Yong-hui	15,014	23.21
Democratic Labor	Heo Gyeong-do	4,367	6.75
Total votes		65,633	100
Grand National hold			

==== 2008 ====
18th National Assembly of the Republic of Korea elections, 2008, Dalseong, Daegu
Party	Candidate	Votes	%
Grand National	Park Geun-hye	50,149	88.57
Democratic Labor	No Yun-jo	5,080	8.97
PUFP	Im Jung-heon	1,386	2.44
Total votes		57,416	100
Grand National hold			

==== 2012 ====
19th National Assembly of the Republic of Korea elections, 2012, Proportional Representative
Party	Candidate	Votes	%
Saenuri	Park Geun-hye	9,130,651	42.80
Saenuri hold			

=== Presidential (2012) ===
Candidate	Party	Votes	%
Park Geun-hye	Saenuri Party	15,773,128	51.56
Moon Jae-in	Democratic United Party	14,692,632	48.02
Kang Ji-won	Independent	53,303	0.17
Kim Soon-ja	Independent	46,017	0.15
Kim So-yeon	Independent	16,687	0.05
Park Jong-sun	Independent	12,854	0.04
Total		30,594,621	100.00
Valid votes		30,594,621	99.59
Invalid/blank votes		126,838	0.41
Total votes		30,721,459	100.00
Registered voters/turnout		40,507,842	75.84
Source: National Election Commission

== Publications ==
=== Books ===
- —— (July 2007). 절망은 나를 단련시키고 희망은 나를 움직인다 [Despair Trains Me and Hope Moves Me] (in Korean). Wisdom House. ISBN 978-89-6086-033-9.
- —— (January 2001). 나의 어머니 육영수 [My mother, Yuk Young-soo] (in Korean). People&People. ISBN 978-89-85541-54-1.
- —— (October 1998). 결국 한 줌, 결국 한 점 [In the End Only a Fistful, One Speck] (in Korean). Busan Ilbo Books. ISBN 978-89-87236-25-4.
- —— (October 1998). 고난을 벗 삼아 진실을 등대삼아 [Befriending Adversity: Truth as the Guiding Light] (in Korean). Busan Ilbo Books. ISBN 978-89-87236-24-7.
- —— (May 1995). 내 마음의 여정 [Journey of My Mind] (in Korean). Hansol Media. ISBN 978-89-85656-50-4.
- —— (November 1993). 평범한 가정에 태어났더라면 [If I Were Born in an Ordinary Family] (in Korean). Nam Song. ISBN 9780307455628. OCLC 33010951.

=== Articles ===
- "A New Kind of Korea: Building Trust Between Seoul and Pyongyang". Foreign Affairs. September–October 2011.

== See also ==
- Politics of South Korea

== Explanatory footnotes ==
Honorary titles
Preceded by Yuk Young-soo	First Lady of South Korea; Acting; 16 August 1974 – 26 October 1979	Succeeded by Hong Gi
National Assembly of the Republic of Korea
Preceded by Gim Suk-won	Member of the National Assembly from Dalseong District; 3 April 1998 – 29 May 2012	Succeeded by Lee Jong-jin
Preceded by	Member of the National Assembly from Proportional Representation (11st, Saenuri Party); 30 May 2012 – 25 November 2012	Succeeded by
Party political offices
Preceded by Choi Byung-ryeol; Kim Deok-ryong (Acting)	Leader of the Grand National Party; 23 March 2004 – 4 July 2004; 19 July 2004 – 15 June 2006	Succeeded by Kim Yeong-seon (Acting); Kang Jae-sup
Preceded by Hong Joon-pyo as Chairman of the Grand National Party; Na Kyung-won (Acting); Hwang Woo-yea (Interim)	Interim Leader of the Saenuri Party; 19 December 2011 – 15 May 2012	Succeeded by Hwang Woo-yea as Leader of the Sanuri Party
Preceded by Lee Myung-bak	Saenuri Party nominee for President of South Korea; 2012	Succeeded by Hong Joon-pyo
Political offices
Preceded by Lee Myung-bak	President of South Korea; 25 February 2013 – 10 March 2017 (Powers and duties suspended) 9 December 2016 – 10 March 2017	Succeeded by Hwang Kyo-ahn (Acting); Moon Jae-in
