= Choi Tae-min =

South Korean cult leader (1912–1994)

- Born: 5 May 1912; So-dong, Sariwon, Hwanghae
- Died: 1 May 1994 (aged 81); Yeoksam-dong, Seoul
- Education: Chaeryong Potong School
- Spouse: Lim Seon-yi
- Children: Choi Soon-sil
- Relatives: Chung Yoo-ra (granddaughter)

Korean name
- Hangul: 최태민
- Hanja: 崔太敏
- RR: Choe Taemin
- MR: Ch'oe T'aemin

Former name
- Hangul: 최도원
- Hanja: 崔道源
- RR: Choe Dowon
- MR: Ch'oe Towŏn

Choi Tae-min (Korean: 최태민; 5 May 1912 – 1 May 1994) was the leader of the Church of Eternal Life, a South Korean cult combining elements of Buddhism, Christianity, and traditional Korean Shamanism. Choi, originally a Buddhist monk, then a convert to Presbyterian pastor, was married six times. He was the mentor of the impeached South Korean president, Park Geun-hye (the daughter of former president Park Chung Hee), until his death in 1994. He allegedly used his relationship with Park to solicit bribes from government officials and businessmen. In late 2016, a scandal involving his daughter, Choi Soon-sil, broke out, with allegations that she too has exerted undue influence over President Park.

== History ==
Choi Tae-min set up a religious group called Yongsae-gyo (영세교), or "Church of the Spirit World", and declared himself Maitreya, or a "Future Buddha". He befriended Park Geun-hye soon after her mother, Yuk Young-soo, was assassinated in 1974. According to a report by the Korean Central Intelligence Agency from the 1970s that was published by a South Korean news magazine in 2007, Choi initially approached Park Geun-hye by telling her that her mother had appeared to him in his dreams, asking him to help her daughter.

Choi was an associate of former-president President Park Chung Hee until the latter's death by assassination in 1979. Kim Jae-gyu, the director of the KCIA who assassinated President Park Chung Hee, told a court that one of his motives was what he called the president's failure to stop Choi Tae-min's corrupt activities and keep him away from his daughter.

In a newspaper interview in 2007, Park Geun-hye called Choi a patriot and said she was grateful for his counsel and comfort during "difficult times".

A 2007 leaked diplomatic cable from the American Embassy in Seoul reported rumors that Mr. Choi, a 'Korean Rasputin', "had complete control over Park's body and soul during her formative years and that his children accumulated enormous wealth as a result."

== Frequently-used names ==
He used seven different names:

- Choi Do-won (최도원; 崔道源, 1927)
- Choi Sang-hun (최상훈; 崔尙勳, 1945)
- Choi Bong-su (최봉수; 崔峰壽, 1951)
- Choi Toe-un (최퇴운; 崔退雲, 1954)
- Gong Hae-nam (공해남; 孔亥南, 1969)
- Bang Min (방민; 房敏, 1971)
- Choi Tae-min (최태민; 崔太敏, 1975)
