= Choi Soon-sil =

South Korean shaman and cult leader (born 1956)

Choi Seo-won
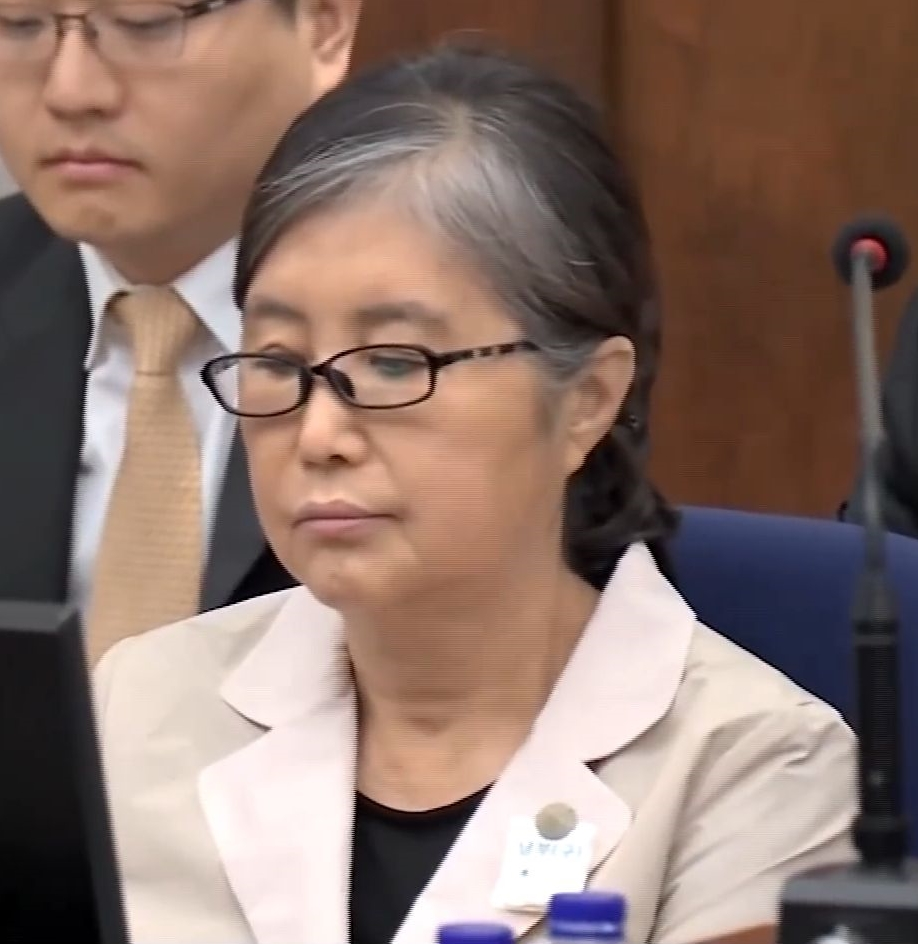
- Born: Choi Soon-sil; 23 June 1956 (age 70); Ahyeon, Mapo, South Korea
- Spouses: Kim Young-ho (m. 1982; div. 1986) Chung Yoon-hoi (m. 1995; div. 2014)
- Children: Chung Yoo-ra
- Parent(s): Choi Tae-min (father); Lim Seon-yi (mother)
- Criminal information
- Status: Incarcerated at the Seoul Detention Center
- Convictions: Abuse of power; Bribery; Interfering in government business; Obstruction of duty
- Penalty: 20 years imprisonment and a ₩18 billion fine

Korean name
- Hangul: 최서원
- Hanja: 崔瑞元
- RR: Choe Seowon
- MR: Ch'oe Sŏwŏn

Former name
- Hangul: 최필녀, 최순실
- Hanja: 崔畢女, 崔順實
- RR: Choe Pilnyeo, Choe Sunsil
- MR: Ch'oe P'illyŏ, Ch'oe Sunsil

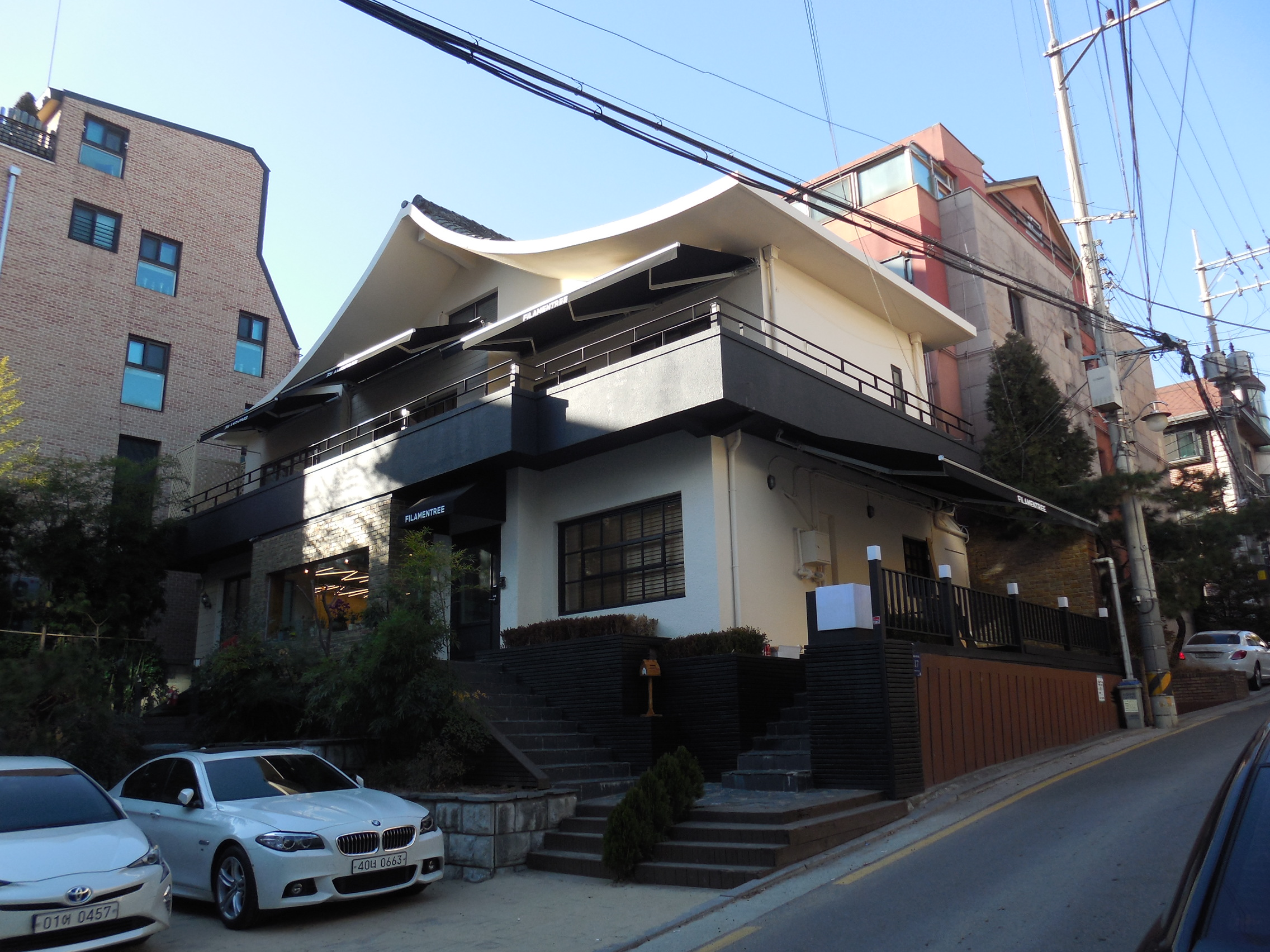
Cafe Testa Rossa

Choi Seo-won (Korean: 최서원), formerly known as Choi Soon-sil (Korean: 최순실; pronounced [t͡ɕʰø.sun.ɕil]), is a South Korean businesswoman known primarily for her involvement in the 2016 South Korean political scandal, stemming from her influence over the 11th President of South Korea, Park Geun-hye. In 2018, a court sentenced Choi to 20 years in prison on corruption charges. Due to Choi's concurrent involvement in her father's religious cult, reporting media have called her "South Korea's Rasputin", in reference to Russian mystic Grigori Rasputin.

== Life and education ==
Choi Soon-sil was born on 23 June 1956, as the fifth daughter in her family to Lim Seon-yi and Choi Tae-min, a former Buddhist monk and the leader of The Church of Eternal Life, a cult that combined various elements of Buddhism, Christianity, and traditional Korean Shamanism. Some media has reported that Choi Soon-il acted as a shaman (mudang) for the sect, although the accuracy of this label, as well as the legitimacy of her practice has been questioned by traditional shamans. She is alleged to have founded a clique named the "Eight Fairies" associated with the impeachment of President Park Geun-hye.

She claimed to have entered Dankook University in 1975. However, upon later research it was discovered that she was only auditing classes. She was married to Kim Young-ho from 1982 to 1986 and they had a son in 1983. She was then married to Chung Yoon-hoi from 1995 to 2014, and they had a daughter in 1996, dressage athlete Chung Yoo-ra. Chung Yoon-hoi had served as secretary to Choi Soon-sil's father, Choi Tae-min, and served as chief of staff to President Park Geun-hye during her time as a congresswoman in the National Assembly.

During the 1980s, Choi started managing a real estate business and operating kindergartens. In 1983, she acquired a 45-pyeong (about 149 square metres (1,600 sq ft)) parcel of land in Yeoksam-dong, Seoul. In September 1985, she acquired a 108-pyeong (about 347 square metres (3,740 sq ft)) parcel of land in Sinsa-dong, where she built a 4-story building and operated a kindergarten in the building. In July 1988, she bought a 200-pyeong (about 661 square metres (7,110 sq ft)) parcel of land in Sinsa-dong under a joint-contract with a partner. Later, Choi bought back the joint shares of her partner and became the sole owner of the property. From 1992 to 1996, Choi established and operated Jubel GmbH jointly with Chung Yoon-hoi, who she would marry during this period. In July 2003, Choi invested in the construction of a building with 7 floors above ground and 2 floors underground, which was later referred to as "M building". Chung Yoon-hoi's company was a tenant in this building. In February 2008, Choi sold the kindergarten building to a savings bank.

In 1989, Choi translated a child-care instruction book entitled How To Hold Your Children's Habit Upright with Kim Kwang-Ung. This book stated that Choi was the vice president of a research center affiliated with the Korea Institute of Culture.

At the outbreak of the 2016 political scandal, Choi operated a café and an Italian restaurant called "Testa Rossa" in Nonhyeon-dong, located in Gangnam, Seoul. The business had been operating since December 2014 in a remodeled building, where the first and second floor served as the café and restaurant and the third floor served as Choi's private office. An insider gave testimony that stated Choi had been meeting with politicians, influential businessmen, and business tycoons on the 2nd and 3rd floors of this building. By then, Choi had legally changed her name twice, but remained more well known under her birth name.

=== Relationship with Park Geun-hye ===
Choi's elder sister, Choi Soon-deuk, was a classmate to Park Geun-hye at Sookmyung Girls' High School since eighth grade.

During her college years, Choi was the president of the National College Student Union, a student organization whose purpose was to "establish an uptight identity, a determined patriotism, and an independent value system". On 10 June 1977, the union held an opening meeting in Hanyang University that was attended by Park Geun-hye, the daughter of then-president Park Chung Hee, where the leader of the Saemaul peace corps sat to the right of Park and future president Lee Myung-bak sat to her left. Choi and Park reportedly became close in 1979, after Park's father was assassinated.

In 2006, Park Geun-hye was attacked by a person with a razor while attending the election campaign of Seoul mayoral candidate Oh Se-hoon as the leader of Grand National Party. Choi Soon-sil looked after Park while she was hospitalized. After leaving the hospital, Park continued to receive treatment at the home of Choi Soon-sil's older sister, Choi Soon-deuk.

== 2016 South Korean political scandal ==
In 2016, Choi was involved in a scandal that alleged that she was responsible for masterminding governmental policy and decision-making during Park's administration. After these allegations arose, prosecutors ordered raids on offices and homes linked to Choi, where further evidence to support the claims were found. It was also alleged that Choi ordered Korean prosecutors to indict Japanese journalist Tatsuya Kato, Seoul Bureau chief of Sankei Shimbun, on defamation charges after he reported that President Park and Chung Yoon-hoi had a secret seven-hour meeting with Choi after the sinking of MV Sewol during an extended period after the sinking in which President Park could not be contacted. Choi was also alleged to have used a South Korean overseas development assistance project (a convention center in Myanmar) for improper personal benefits.

On 31 October 2016, Choi met with prosecutors. Choi told reporters, "Please, forgive me. I'm sorry. I committed a sin that deserves death". On November 20, Choi Soon-sil was officially charged by the prosecutors for intervening in state affairs and using her influence to force chaebols to donate tens of millions of dollars to foundations and businesses she controlled.

Choi's elder sister Choi Soon-deuk was questioned by prosecutors after it was discovered that Park received injections for prescription medicines issued in the names of both Choi sisters. Jang Si-ho, daughter of Choi Soon-deuk and niece to Choi Soon-sil, was convicted of coercion and embezzlement in 2017 and sentenced to two years and six months imprisonment, due to her association with her aunt in operating the Korea Winter Sports Elite Center, which was alleged to have coerced numerous businesses. In 2018, the embezzlement conviction was overturned and Jang was resentenced to one year and six months.

=== Sentencing and imprisonment ===
On 23 June 2017, the Seoul Central District Court found Choi guilty of charges of obstruction of duty by using her presidential ties to get her daughter admitted to Ewha Womans University and receive good grades, and sentenced her to three years of imprisonment. On 13 February 2018, the Seoul Central District Court found Choi guilty of charges of abuse of power, bribery, and interfering in government business, which extended her prison sentence by 20 years and ordered her to pay a fine of ₩18 billion (US$16.6 million). In February 2020, her 2018 sentence was reduced to 18 years for a total of 21 years imprisonment following a retrial. Choi appealed the ruling with the supreme court, which upheld the sentence with a ₩26.3 billion fine and confiscation of ₩6.3 billion in June 2020.

In June 2020, while still incarcerated, Choi, now going by Choi Seo-won, published a personal memoir titled "Who Am I", in which she denied having influenced Park in any way, claiming that she only provided emotional support as an "invisible person" during Park's presidency, with Choi maintaining that her own conviction was part of a government plot against Park.
