= Chung Yoo-ra =

South Korean equestrian (born 1996)

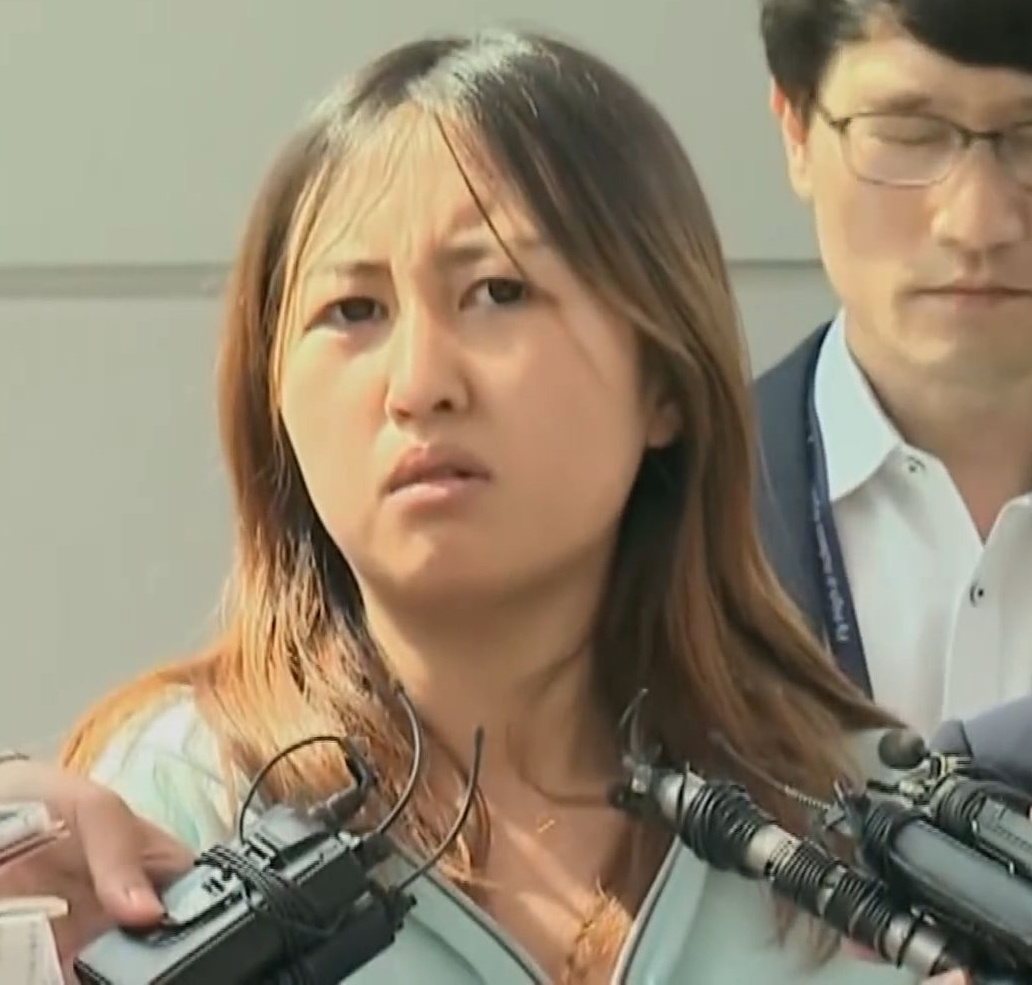
- Chung Yoo-ra, who was extradited from Denmark to South Korea via Incheon International Airport on 31 May 2017

Personal information
- Born: Chung Yoo-yeon; October 30, 1996 (age 29) Seoul, South Korea
- Education: Chungdam High School (diploma revoked); Ewha College (expelled)
- Spouse: Sin Ju-pyung (m. 2015–2016)

Korean name
- Hangul: 정유라
- Hanja: 鄭維羅
- RR: Jeong Yura
- MR: Chŏng Yura

Former name
- Hangul: 정유연
- Hanja: 鄭有然
- RR: Jeong Yuyeon
- MR: Chŏng Yuyŏn
Medal record
Equestrian
Representing South Korea
Asian Games
Gold medal – first place	2014 Incheon	Team dressage

Chung Yoo-ra (Korean: 정유라; born 30 October 1996), birth name Chung Yoo-yeon (정유연), is a South Korean equestrian. She competed in the 2014 Asian Games, where her team won a gold medal.

She is a daughter of Chung Yoon-hoi and his ex-wife Choi Soon-sil, who has been arrested amid the 2016 South Korean political scandal for using her friendship with the president Park Geun-hye to illegally interfere in state affairs. Choi allegedly solicited business donations from top South Korean firms, including Samsung, for a nonprofit organization that was controlled by her.

== Controversy ==
=== Alleged preferential admission to games ===
Ahn Min-Seok is a member of the New Politics Alliance for Democracy (NAPD) and alleges that favors were exchanged to make sure that Chung Yoo-Ra would participate in the Incheon Asian Games.

=== Alleged preferential school treatment ===
Chung Yoo-Ra only attended 86 out of 205 days of class during her third year at the Sunhwa Arts Middle School. Furthermore, she was completely absent for 42 days of class and left early without permission at 46 instances because of her equestrian training and competitions. The school only excused her for 3 absences and 6 instances of tardiness when she was sick. At the time, Song Ki-Seok, an administrator at the School District of Seoul, knew about her absenteeism but did nothing about it.

Chungdam High School expelled her for excessive absenteeism, but Choi Soon-sil successfully appealed the expulsion by producing an official letter from the Korean Racing Association. However, on December 5, 2016, the Board of Education of the School District of Seoul revoked her high school diploma. The board further accuses her of bribing her high school teacher for a perfect score at her exit examination and forging her records at an equestrian competition that she never participated in.

She allegedly lied about winning a gold medal at the Asian Games during her admission interview for Ewha College (a women's college). Professors also allegedly gave her credits that she did not deserve. When suspicions arose, Chung Yoo-Ra suddenly applied online for a leave of absence from the college but ultimately did not complete her application.

On December 2, 2016, and after a special investigation, Ewha College's Audit Committee requested the college to expel Chung Yoo-Ra, revoke her admission, and discipline the corrupt professors. On December 5, 2016, she received a letter from the board which revoked her high school diploma and a letter of expulsion from her college but decided to not appeal those decisions.

=== Alleged K-Sports Foundation embezzlement ===
Chung Yoo-Ra allegedly embezzled funds from the K-Sports Foundation, which was used by Choi Soon-Sil to solicit bribes from South Korean conglomerates. Choi also used a number of shell companies to facilitate her crimes. Choi closed these companies on the same day that the Mir Foundation and K-Sports Foundation were in the news for illicit activities.

=== Arrest by Danish local police ===
On January 2, 2017, Lee Ga-hyuk, a reporter from the JTBC Newsroom, tracked down Chung Yoo-Ra's Volkswagen, which was parked inside the garage of her Aalborg hideout. A Korean resident in Denmark suspected Chung of illegal immigration and reported her to the local police, who promptly arrested her.

=== Expulsion from the Korea Equestrian Association ===
On April 17, 2017, the Korean Racing Association permanently expelled and banned Chung Yoo-ra from both international and domestic competitions because of her admissions scandal. It also ordered her to return the stipend that was paid by the national team.

== Legal issues ==
During the investigations of the 2016 South Korean political scandal, Ewha College revoked her admission due to "preferential treatment in admissions and grading". The board of the School District of Seoul also revoked her high school diploma because she falsified her high school records.

In December 2016, South Korea put out an arrest warrant for Chung Yoo-ra for charges including obstruction of justice after she refused to return from Germany to attend a parliamentary inquiry about her role in the scandal. The South Korean government announced that it would invalidate her passport and seek her arrest and extradition from Germany. The South Korean government also sought the help of Interpol to track her down. On January 1, 2017, some South Korean journalists managed to track her down in Aalborg and tipped the Danish police of her whereabouts, who promptly arrested her.

The German Federal Police are investigating Chung Yoo-ra and her mother for money laundering involving assets that are estimated at more than 1 billion US dollars.
