= 1988 =

1988 in various calendars
- Gregorian calendar: 1988; MCMLXXXVIII
- Ab urbe condita: 2741
- Armenian calendar: 1437; ԹՎ ՌՆԼԷ
- Assyrian calendar: 6738
- Baháʼí calendar: 144–145
- Balinese saka calendar: 1909–1910
- Bengali calendar: 1394–1395
- Berber calendar: 2938
- British Regnal year: 36 Eliz. 2 – 37 Eliz. 2
- Buddhist calendar: 2532
- Burmese calendar: 1350
- Byzantine calendar: 7496–7497
- Chinese calendar: 丁卯年 (Fire Rabbit); 4685 or 4478 — to — 戊辰年 (Earth Dragon); 4686 or 4479
- Coptic calendar: 1704–1705
- Discordian calendar: 3154
- Ethiopian calendar: 1980–1981
- Hebrew calendar: 5748–5749
- Hindu calendars
- Vikram Samvat: 2044–2045
- Shaka Samvat: 1909–1910
- Kali Yuga: 5088–5089
- Holocene calendar: 11988
- Igbo calendar: 988–989
- Iranian calendar: 1366–1367
- Islamic calendar: 1408–1409
- Japanese calendar: Shōwa 63 (昭和６３年)
- Javanese calendar: 1920–1921
- Juche calendar: 77
- Julian calendar: Gregorian minus 13 days
- Korean calendar: 4321
- Minguo calendar: ROC 77 民國77年
- Nanakshahi calendar: 520
- Thai solar calendar: 2531
- Tibetan calendar: མེ་མོ་ཡོས་ལོ་ (female Fire-Hare); 2114 or 1733 or 961 — to — ས་ཕོ་འབྲུག་ལོ་ (male Earth-Dragon); 2115 or 1734 or 962
- Unix time: 567993600 – 599615999

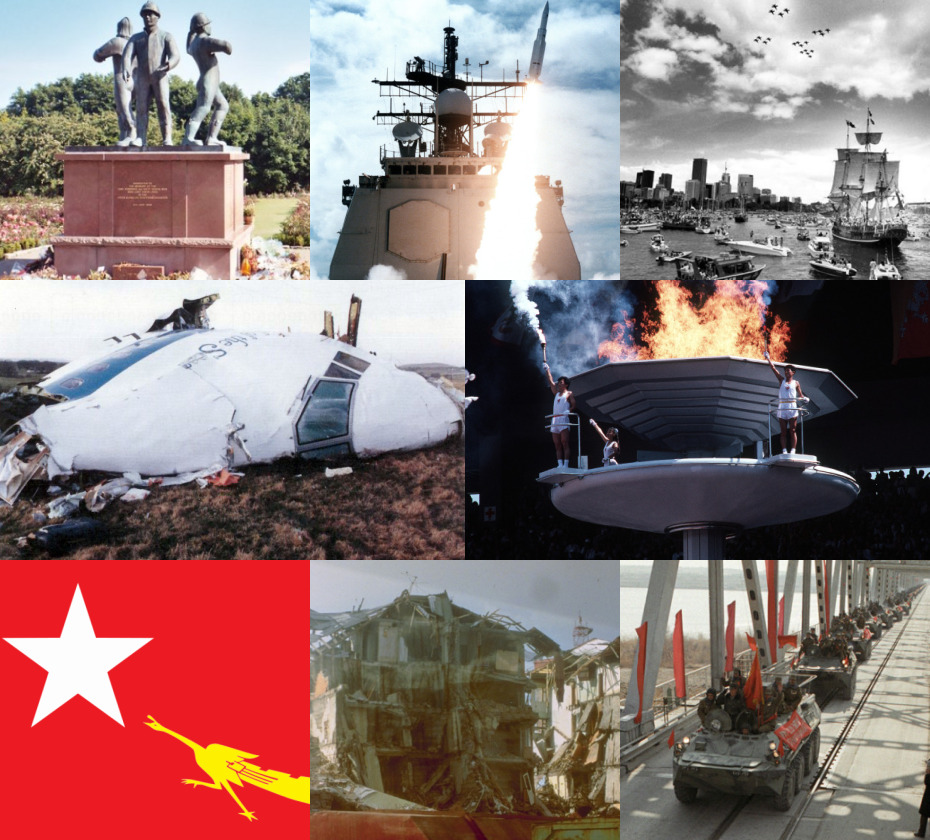
From left, clockwise: the oil platform Piper Alpha explodes and collapses in the North Sea, killing 165 workers; the USS Vincennes (CG-49) mistakenly shoots down Iran Air Flight 655, killing all 290 people on board; Australia celebrates its Bicentennial on January 26; the 1988 Summer Olympics are held in Seoul, South Korea; Soviet troops begin their withdrawal from Afghanistan, which is completed the next year; an earthquake in Armenia kills between 25,000 and 50,000 people; the 8888 Uprising in Myanmar, led by students, protests the Burma Socialist Programme Party; a bomb explodes on Pan Am Flight 103, causing the plane to crash down on the town of Lockerbie, Scotland – the event kills 270 people.

1988 (MCMLXXXVIII) was a leap year starting on Friday of the Gregorian calendar, the 1988th year of the Common Era (CE) and Anno Domini (AD) designations, the 988th year of the 2nd millennium, the 88th year of the 20th century, and the 9th year of the 1980s decade.

1988 was a crucial year in the early history of the Internet—it was the year of the first well-known computer virus, the Morris worm. The first permanent intercontinental Internet link was made between the United States (National Science Foundation Network) and Europe (NORDUnet) as well as the first Internet-based chat protocol, the Internet Relay Chat. The concept of the World Wide Web was first discussed at CERN in 1988.

The Soviet Union began its major deconstructing towards a mixed economy at the beginning of 1988 and began its gradual dissolution. The Iron Curtain began to disintegrate in 1988 as Hungary began allowing freer travel to the Western world. The first extrasolar planet, Gamma Cephei Ab (confirmed in 2003), was detected this year and the World Health Organization began its mission to eradicate polio. Global warming also began to emerge as a more significant concern, with climate scientist James Hansen testifying before the U.S. Senate on the issue.

== Events ==
=== January ===
- January – The cargo ship Khian Sea deposits 4,000 tons of toxic waste in Haiti after wandering around the Atlantic for sixteen months.
- January 1 – The Soviet Union begins its program of economic restructuring (perestroika) with legislation initiated by Premier Mikhail Gorbachev (though Gorbachev had begun minor restructuring in 1985).
- January 7–8 – In the Soviet-Afghan War, 39 men of the Soviet Airborne Troops from the 345th Independent Guards Airborne Regiment fight off an attack by 200 to 250 Mujahideen in the Battle for Hill 3234, later dramatized in the Russian film The 9th Company.
- January 13 – Vice-president Lee Teng-hui takes over as President of the Republic of China and Chairman of the Kuomintang following the death of Chiang Ching-kuo.
- January 26
  - A re-enactment of the First Fleet arrives in Sydney Harbour to mark the bicentenary of the First Fleet arriving in Australia in 1788.
  - Upon request of Hubert Michon, archbishop of Rabat, two Trappist monks come to Fez and start a community that will later become the Priory of Our Lady of the Atlas.

=== February ===
- February 12 – The 1988 Black Sea bumping incident: Soviet frigate Bezzavetnyy intentionally rams USS Yorktown in Soviet territorial waters while Yorktown claims innocent passage. The accompanying US destroyer USS Caron escapes damage.
- February 13–28 – The 1988 Winter Olympics are held in Calgary, Alberta, Canada.
- February 17
  - 1988 Oshakati bomb blast: A bomb explodes outside the First National Bank in Oshakati, Namibia, killing 27 and injuring 70.
  - U.S. Lieutenant Colonel William R. Higgins, serving with a United Nations group monitoring a truce in southern Lebanon, is kidnapped (and later killed by his captors).
- February 20 – The Nagorno-Karabakh Autonomous Oblast votes to secede from the Azerbaijan Soviet Socialist Republic and join the Armenian SSR, triggering the First Nagorno-Karabakh War.
- February 23 – Start of Anfal campaign, a genocidal counterinsurgency operation within the Iran–Iraq War carried out by Ba'athist Iraqi forces led by Ali Hassan al-Majid on the orders of President Saddam Hussein that will kill between 50,000 and 182,000 Kurds in Iraqi Kurdistan.
- February 25 – The constitution of the Sixth Republic of Korea comes into effect.
- February 27–29 – Collapse of the Soviet Union: The Sumgait pogrom of Armenians occurs in Sumqayit.
- February 29 – A Nazi document implicates Kurt Waldheim in World War II deportations.

=== March ===
- March 6 – Operation Flavius: A Special Air Service team of the British Army shoots dead 3 unarmed members of a Provisional Irish Republican Army (IRA) Active service unit in Gibraltar.
- March 16
  - The Halabja chemical attack is carried out by Iraqi government forces.
  - Iran–Contra affair: Lieutenant Colonel Oliver North and Vice Admiral John Poindexter are indicted on charges of conspiracy to defraud the United States.
  - Milltown Cemetery attack: Three men are killed and 70 wounded in a gun and grenade attack by loyalist paramilitary Michael Stone on mourners at Milltown Cemetery in Belfast, Northern Ireland, during the funerals of the 3 IRA members killed in Gibraltar.
  - In the United States, the First Republic Bank of Texas fails and enters FDIC receivership, the largest FDIC assisted bank failure in history.
- March 17
  - A Colombian Boeing 727 jetliner, Avianca Flight 410, crashes into the side of the mountains near the Venezuelan border, killing 143 people.
  - Eritrean War of Independence – Battle of Afabet: The Nadew Command, an Ethiopian army corps in Eritrea, is attacked on 3 sides by military units of the Eritrean People's Liberation Front (EPLF).
- March 19 – Corporals killings in Belfast: Two British Army corporals are abducted, beaten and shot dead by Irish republicans after driving into the funeral cortege of IRA members killed in the Milltown Cemetery attack.
- March 20 – Eritrean War of Independence: Having defeated the Nadew Command, the EPLF enters the town of Afabet, victoriously concluding the Battle of Afabet.
- March 24 – The first McDonald's restaurant in a country run by a Communist party opens in Belgrade, Yugoslavia. It was later followed by one in Budapest, and in 1990 in Moscow, and Shenzhen, China.
- March 25 – The Candle demonstration in Bratislava, Slovakia, is the first mass demonstration of the 1980s against the socialist government in Czechoslovakia.

=== April ===
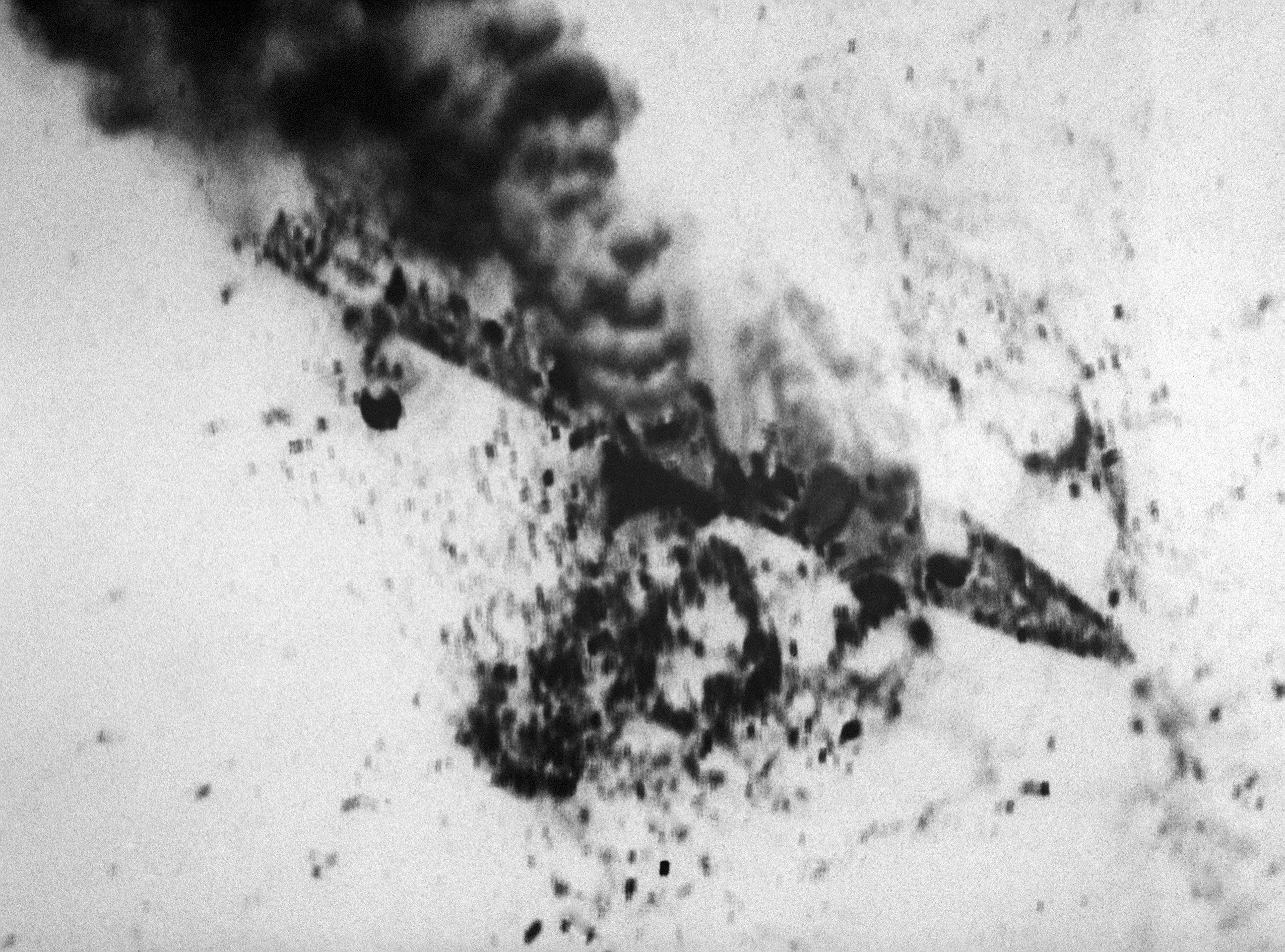
The Iranian frigate, IS Alvand, attacked by US Navy forces during Operation Praying Mantis

- April 1 – A bus carrying 54 passengers falls into the Han River in Seoul, South Korea killing 19 and injuring 35.
- April 5 – Kuwait Airways Flight 422 is hijacked while en route from Bangkok, Thailand, to Kuwait. The hijackers demand the release of 17 Shiite Muslim prisoners held by Kuwait. Kuwait refuses to release the prisoners, leading to a 16-day siege across 3 continents. Two passengers are killed before the siege ends.
- April 10 – The Ojhri Camp Disaster occurs in Islamabad and Rawalpindi.
- April 14
  - In the Geneva Accords, the Soviet Union commits itself to withdrawal of its forces from Afghanistan.
  - The USS Samuel B. Roberts (FFG-58) strikes a naval mine in the Persian Gulf, while deployed on Operation Earnest Will, during the Tanker War phase of the Iran–Iraq War.
- April 16 – Israeli commandos kill the PLO's Abu Jihad in Tunisia.
- April 18 – The United States Navy retaliates for the USS Samuel B. Roberts mining with Operation Praying Mantis, in a day of strikes against Iranian oil platforms and naval vessels.
- April 20 – The world's longest skyjacking comes to an end when the remaining passengers of Kuwait Airways Flight 422 are released by their captors.
- April 28 – Aloha Airlines Flight 243 safely lands after losing its roof in midair, killing a flight attendant and injuring 65 people.
- April 30 – World Expo 88 opens in Brisbane, Queensland, Australia.

=== May ===
- May 8 – François Mitterrand is re-elected as President of France for 7 years.
- May 15 – Soviet–Afghan War: After more than 8 years of fighting, the Soviet Army begins its withdrawal from Afghanistan.
- May 16–18 – 1988 Gilgit massacre: A revolt by the Shias of Gilgit (in northern Pakistan) is ruthlessly suppressed by the Zia-ul Haq regime.
- May 27–29 – Somaliland War of Independence: Somali National Movement launches a major offensive against Somali government forces in Hargeisa and Burao, then second and third largest cities of Somalia.
- May 29–June 3 – The Moscow Summit meeting between U.S. President Ronald Reagan and General Secretary of the Communist Party of the Soviet Union Mikhail Gorbachev takes place, where the Intermediate-Range Nuclear Forces Treaty (INF) was finalized.

=== June ===
- June 10–14 – Spontaneous 100,000 strong mass night-singing demonstrations in Estonian SSR eventually give name to the Singing Revolution.
- June 10–25 – West Germany hosts the UEFA Euro 1988 football tournament, which is won by the Netherlands.
- June 21 – The Poole explosion of 1988 caused 3,500 people to be evacuated out of the town centre in the biggest peacetime evacuation the United Kingdom had seen since the World War II.
- June 23 – NASA scientist James Hansen testifies to the U.S. Senate that human-made global warming has begun, becoming one of the first environmentalists to warn of the problem.
- June 27
  - The Gare de Lyon rail accident occurs in Paris, France as a commuter train headed inbound to the terminal crashes into a stationary outbound train, killing 56 and injuring 57.
  - Villa Tunari massacre: Bolivian anti-narcotics police kills 9 to 12 and injures over a hundred protesting coca-growing peasants.
- June 30 – Roman Catholic Archbishop Marcel Lefebvre consecrates four bishops at Écône, Switzerland, for his apostolate, along with Bishop Antonio de Castro Mayer, without a papal mandate.

=== July ===
- July 1 – The Soviet Union votes to end the CPSU's monopoly on economic and other non-political power and to further economic changes towards a less rigidly Marxist-Leninist economy.
- July 3
  - The Fatih Sultan Mehmet Bridge in Istanbul, Turkey, is completed, providing the second connection between the continents of Europe and Asia over the Bosphorus.
  - Iran Air Flight 655 is shot down by a missile launched from the USS Vincennes, killing a total of 290 people on board.
- July 6 – The Piper Alpha production platform in the North Sea is destroyed by explosions and fires, killing 165 oil workers and 2 rescue mariners. 61 workers survive.
- July 31 – Thirty-two people are killed and 1,674 injured when a bridge at the Sultan Abdul Halim Ferry terminal collapses in Butterworth, Penang, Malaysia.

=== August ===
- August 5 – The 1988 Malaysian constitutional crisis culminates in the ousting of the Lord President of Malaysia, Salleh Abas.
- August 8 – 8888 Uprising: Thousands of protesters in Burma, now known as Myanmar, are killed during anti-government demonstrations.
- August 11 – A meeting of Islamic Jihadi leaders, including Osama bin Laden, takes place, leading to the founding of Al-Qaeda.
- August 17 – Pakistani President Muhammad Zia-ul-Haq and the U.S. ambassador to Pakistan, Arnold Lewis Raphel, are among those killed when a plane crashes and explodes near Bahawalpur.
- August 20 – A ceasefire effectively ends the Iran–Iraq War, with an estimated one million lives lost.
- August 21 – The M_{w} 6.9 Nepal earthquake shakes the Nepal–India border with a maximum Mercalli intensity of VIII (Severe), leaving 709–1,450 people killed and thousands injured.
- August 28 – Seventy people are killed and 346 injured in one of the worst air show disasters in history at Germany's Ramstein Air Base, when three jets from the Italian air demonstration team, Frecce Tricolori, collide, sending one of the aircraft crashing into the crowd of spectators.

=== September ===
- September 11 – Singing Revolution: In the Estonian Soviet Socialist Republic, 300,000 people gather to express their support for independence.
- September 12 – Hurricane Gilbert devastates Jamaica; it turns towards Mexico's Yucatán Peninsula 2 days later, causing an estimated $5 billion in damage.
- September 15 – The International Olympic Committee awards Lillehammer the right to host the 1994 Winter Olympics.
- September 17–October 2 – The 1988 Summer Olympics are held in Seoul, South Korea.
- September 22 – The Ocean Odyssey drilling rig suffers a blowout and fire in the North Sea (see also July 6), resulting in one death.
- September 29 – STS-26: NASA resumes Space Shuttle flights, grounded after the Challenger disaster, with Space Shuttle Discovery.

=== October ===
- October 5
  - Thousands riot in Algiers, Algeria against the National Liberation Front government; by October 10 the army has tortured and killed about 500 people in crushing the riots.
  - Chilean dictator Augusto Pinochet loses a national plebiscite on his rule; he relinquishes power in 1990.
  - Promulgation of the 1988 Constitution of the Federative Republic of Brazil.
- October 12
  - Walsh Street police shootings: Two Victoria Police officers are gunned down, execution style, in Australia.
  - The Birchandra Manu massacre occurs in Tripura, India.
- October 20 – The Los Angeles Dodgers won 4 games to 1 in the 1988 World Series against the Oakland Athletics.
- October 28 – Abortion: 48 hours after announcing it was abandoning RU-486, French manufacturer Roussel Uclaf states that it will resume distribution of the drug.
- October 29 – Pakistan's General Rahimuddin Khan resigns from his post as the governor of Sindh, following attempts by the President of Pakistan, Ghulam Ishaq Khan, to limit the powers Rahimuddin had accumulated.
- October 30 – Jericho bus firebombing: Five Israelis are killed and five wounded in a Palestinian attack in the West Bank.

=== November ===
- November – TAT-8, the first transatlantic telephone cable to use optical fibers, is completed. This leads to more robust connections between the American and European Internet.
- November 2 – The Morris worm, the first computer worm distributed via the Internet, written by Robert Tappan Morris, is launched from Massachusetts Institute of Technology in the U.S.
- November 3 – 1988 Maldives coup attempt: The People's Liberation Organisation of Tamil Eelam, a Sri Lankan Tamil militant group, attempts to overthrow the Maldivian government. At the request of President Maumoon Abdul Gayoom, the Indian military suppresses the coup attempt within 24 hours.
- November 6 – The 1988 Lancang–Gengma earthquakes kills at least 938 people when it strikes the China–Myanmar border region in Yunnan.
- November 8 – The United States Vice-president and Republican nominee George H. W. Bush defeats the Democratic nominee and Governor of Massachusetts, Michael Dukakis, in the 1988 United States Presidential Election.
- November 15
  - In the Soviet Union, the uncrewed Shuttle Buran is launched by an Energia rocket on its maiden orbital spaceflight (the first and last space flight for the shuttle).
  - Israeli–Palestinian conflict: An independent State of Palestine is proclaimed at the Palestinian National Council meeting in Algiers, by a vote of 253–46.
  - The first Fairtrade label, Max Havelaar, is launched by Nico Roozen, Frans van der Hoff and ecumenical development agency Solidaridad in the Netherlands.
- November 16
  - Singing Revolution: The Supreme Soviet of the Estonian SSR adopts the Estonian Sovereignty Declaration in which the laws of the Estonian SSR are declared supreme over those of the Soviet Union. The USSR declares it unconstitutional on November 26. It is the first declaration of sovereignty from the Soviet Union of any Soviet or Eastern Bloc entity.
  - In the first open election in more than a decade, voters in Pakistan choose populist candidate Benazir Bhutto to be Prime Minister. Elections are held as planned despite head of state Zia-ul-Haq's death earlier in August.
- November 23 – Former Korean president Chun Doo-hwan makes a formal apology for corruption during his presidency, announcing he will go into exile.

=== December ===
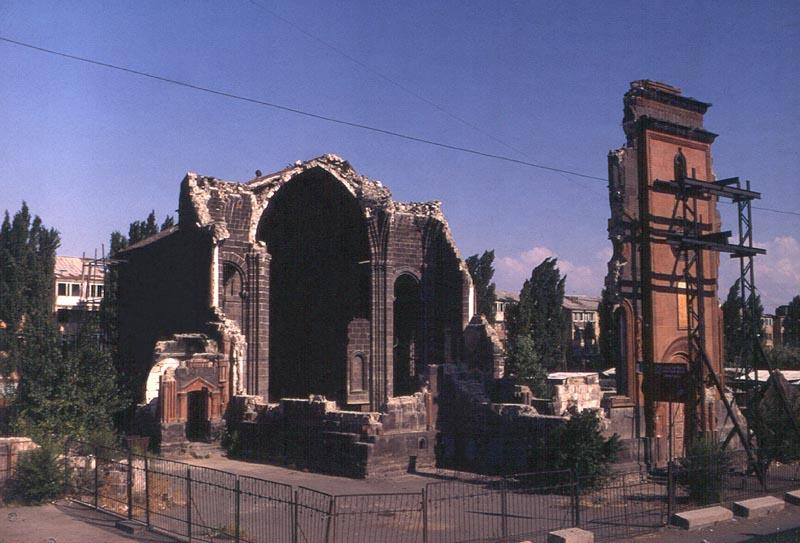
The Holy Saviour's Church in Gyumri after the Spitak earthquake in Armenia, December 7

- December 1
  - Carlos Salinas de Gortari takes office as President of Mexico.
  - The first World AIDS Day is held.
- December 2
  - Benazir Bhutto is sworn in as Prime Minister of Pakistan, becoming the first woman to head the government of an Islam-dominated state.
  - A cyclone in Bangladesh leaves 5 million homeless and thousands dead.
- December 6 – The Australian Capital Territory is granted self-government by the Australian Capital Territory (Self-Government) Act 1988.
- December 7 – In Soviet Armenia, the M_{s} 6.8 Spitak earthquake kills nearly 25,000, injures 31,000 and leaves 400,000 homeless.
- December 12 – The Clapham Junction rail crash in London kills 35 and injures 132.
- December 16 – Perennial U.S. presidential candidate Lyndon LaRouche is convicted of mail fraud.
- December 20 – The United Nations Convention Against Illicit Traffic in Narcotic Drugs and Psychotropic Substances is signed at Vienna.
- December 21 – Pan Am Flight 103 is blown up over Lockerbie, Scotland, killing a total of 270 people. Libya is suspected of involvement.

=== Date unknown ===
- Near the end of the year, the first proper and official intercontinental Internet connection between North America (through the National Science Foundation Network) and Europe (through NORDUnet) is permanently established between Princeton, New Jersey, United States, and Stockholm, Sweden.
- Zebra mussels, a species originally native to the lakes of southern Russia and Ukraine, are found in the Great Lakes of North America.
- 1988 Polish strikes.

== Births ==
=== January ===
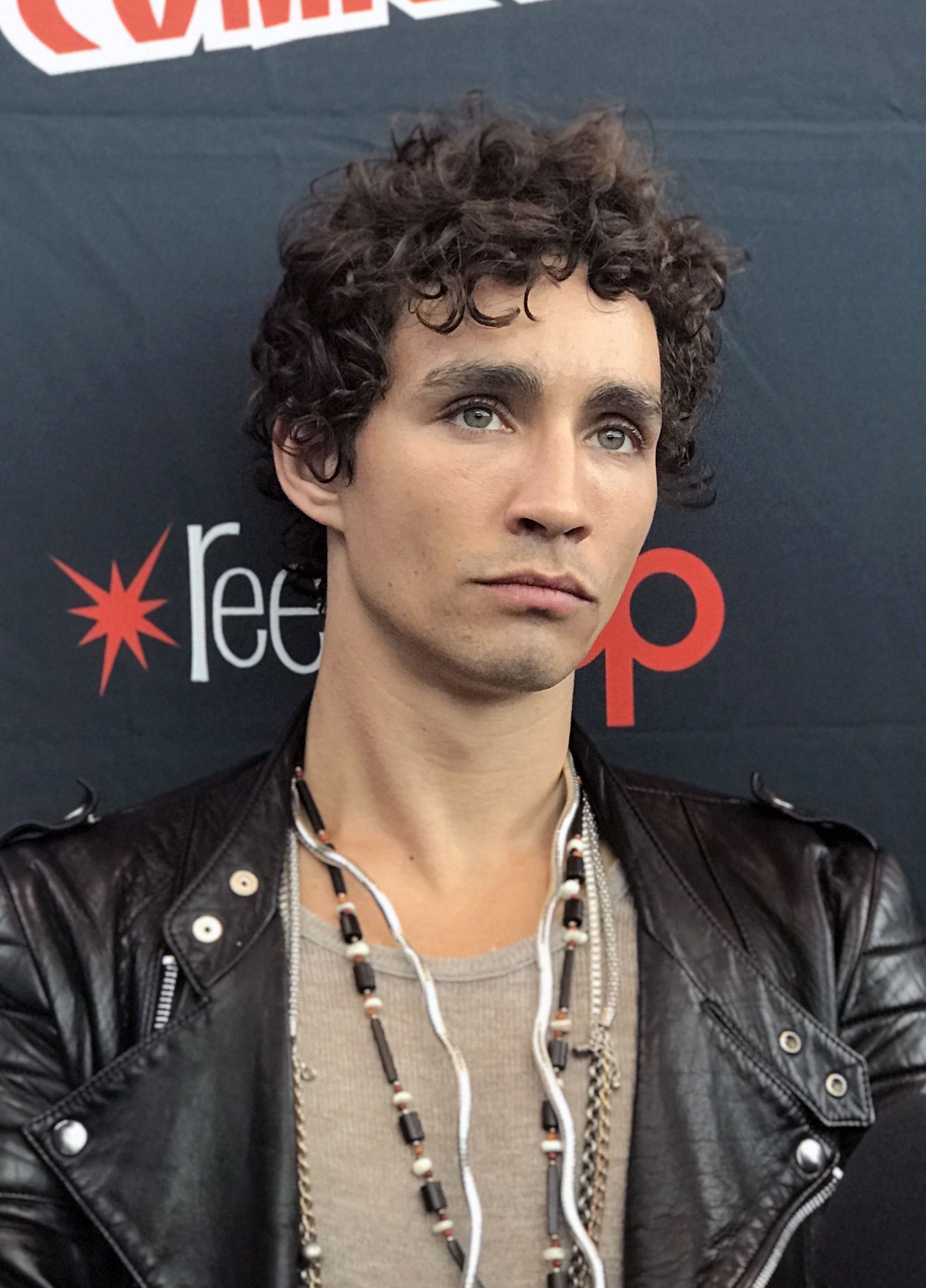
Robert Sheehan

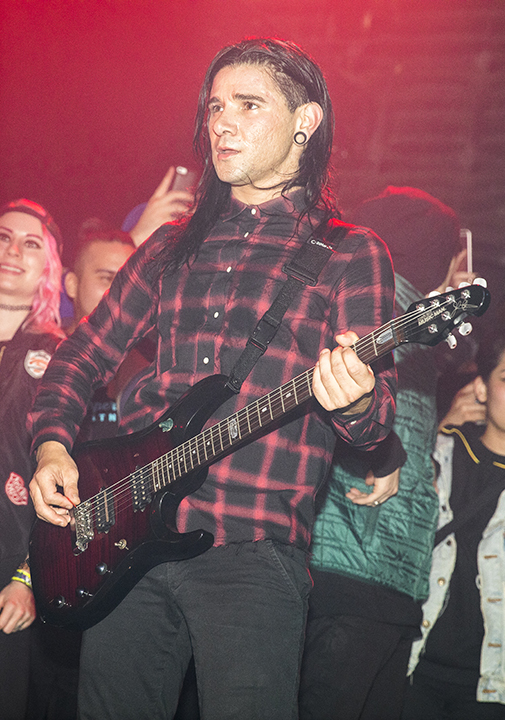
Skrillex

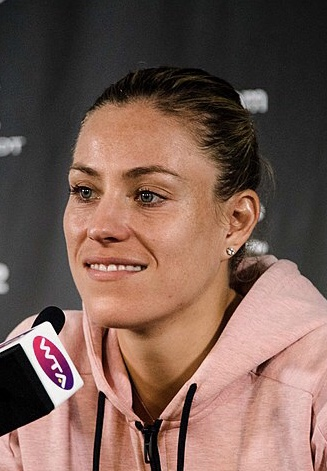
Angelique Kerber

- January 3 – Jonny Evans, Northern Irish footballer
- January 4 - Brennan Lee Mulligan, American comedian, actor, writer, and gamemaster.
- January 5 – Azizulhasni Awang, Malaysian track cyclist
- January 7 – Haley Bennett, American actress and singer
- January 8 – Alex Tyus, American-Israeli basketball player
- January 11 – Wang Yimei, Chinese volleyball player
- January 12
  - Claude Giroux, Canadian ice hockey player
  - Xiong Jing Nan, Chinese mixed martial artist and current ONE Women's Strawweight World Champion
- January 13 – Artjoms Rudņevs, Latvian footballer
- January 15 – Skrillex, American musician and DJ
- January 16
  - Nicklas Bendtner, Danish footballer
  - FKA Twigs, English singer-songwriter, record producer, director and dancer
  - Li Xiaoxia, Chinese table tennis player
- January 18 – Angelique Kerber, German tennis player
- January 21
  - Ashton Eaton, American decathlete
  - Glaiza de Castro, Filipino actress and singer
- January 25 – Tatiana Golovin, Russian-born French professional tennis player
- January 27 – Liu Wen, Chinese model
- January 29 – Stephanie Gilmore, Australian surfer

=== February ===
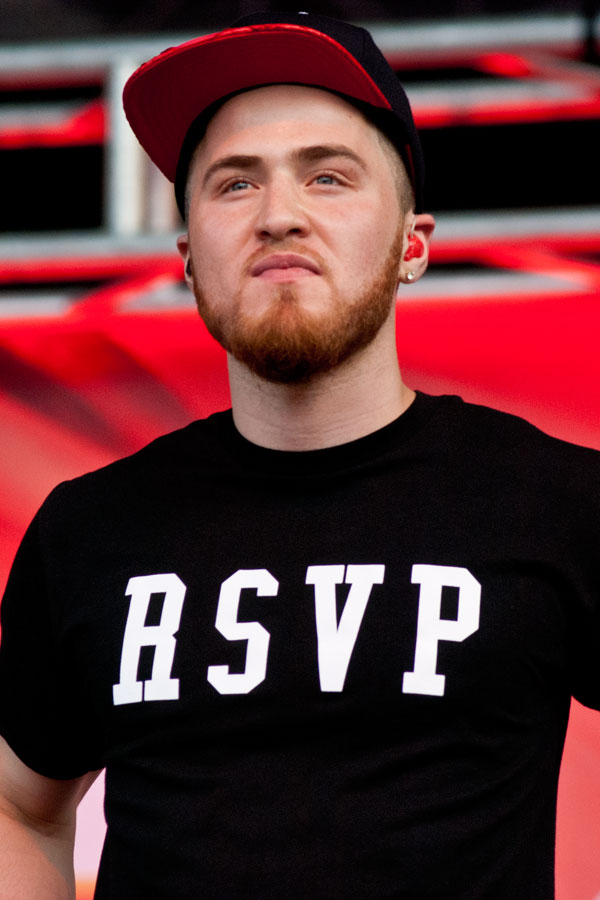
Mike Posner

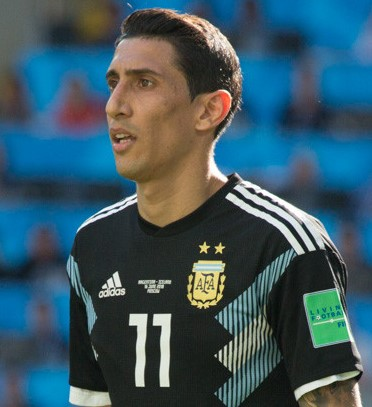
Ángel Di María

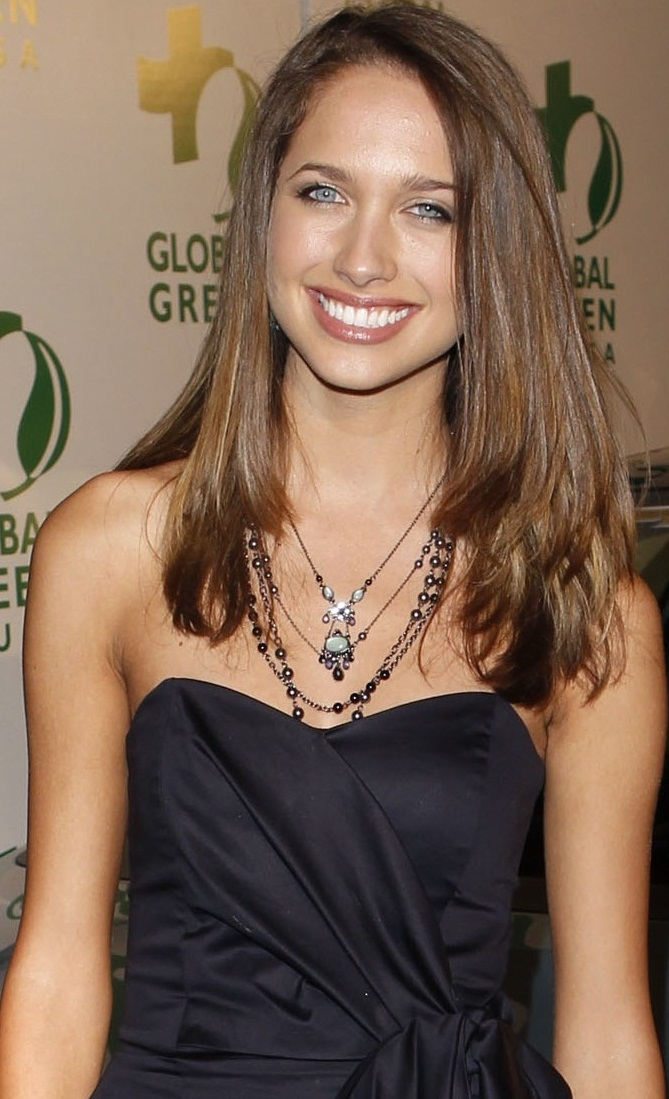
Maiara Walsh

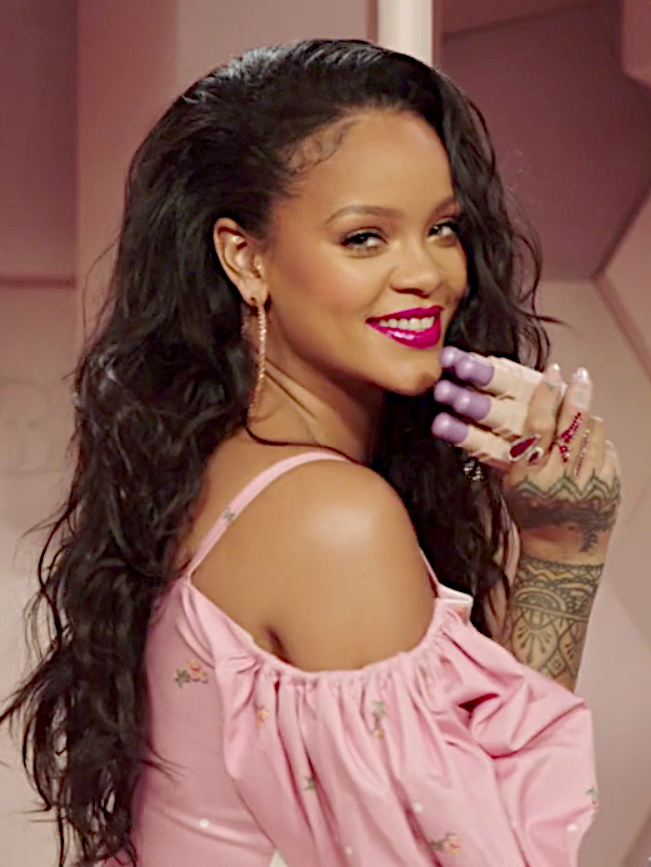
Rihanna

- February 2 – Zosia Mamet, American actress and musician
- February 3
  - Cho Kyuhyun, Korean singer
  - Gregory van der Wiel, Dutch footballer
  - Kamil Glik, Polish footballer
- February 4 – Carly Patterson, American gymnast
- February 7
  - Ai Kago, Japanese singer
  - Lee Joon, South Korean idol singer (MBLAQ), dancer, actor and model
  - Matthew Stafford, American football player
- February 8 – Zemfira Magomedalieva, Russian boxer
- February 9 – Lotte Friis, Danish swimmer
- February 12 – Nicolás Otamendi, Argentinian footballer
- February 13
  - Aston Merrygold, English singer
  - Irene Montero, Spanish politician and psychologist
- February 14 – Ángel Di María, Argentine footballer
- February 15 – Rui Patrício, Portuguese footballer
- February 16
  - Diego Capel, Spanish footballer
  - Zhang Jike, Chinese table tennis player
  - Kim Soo-hyun, South Korean actor
- February 17
  - Natascha Kampusch, Austrian television hostess and kidnapping victim
  - Vasiliy Lomachenko, Ukrainian boxer
- February 20
  - Rihanna, Barbadian pop singer
- February 21 – Matthias de Zordo, German javelin thrower
  - Ki Bo-bae, South Korean archer
- February 22 – Ximena Navarrete, Mexican actress, Miss Universe 2010
- February 24
  - Brittany Bowe, American speed skater
  - Efraín Juárez, Mexican footballer
- February 25 – Claudia Faniello, Maltese singer
- February 26 – Kim Yeon-koung, South Korean volleyball player
- February 28 – Markéta Irglová, Czech-Icelandic singer and songwriter

=== March ===
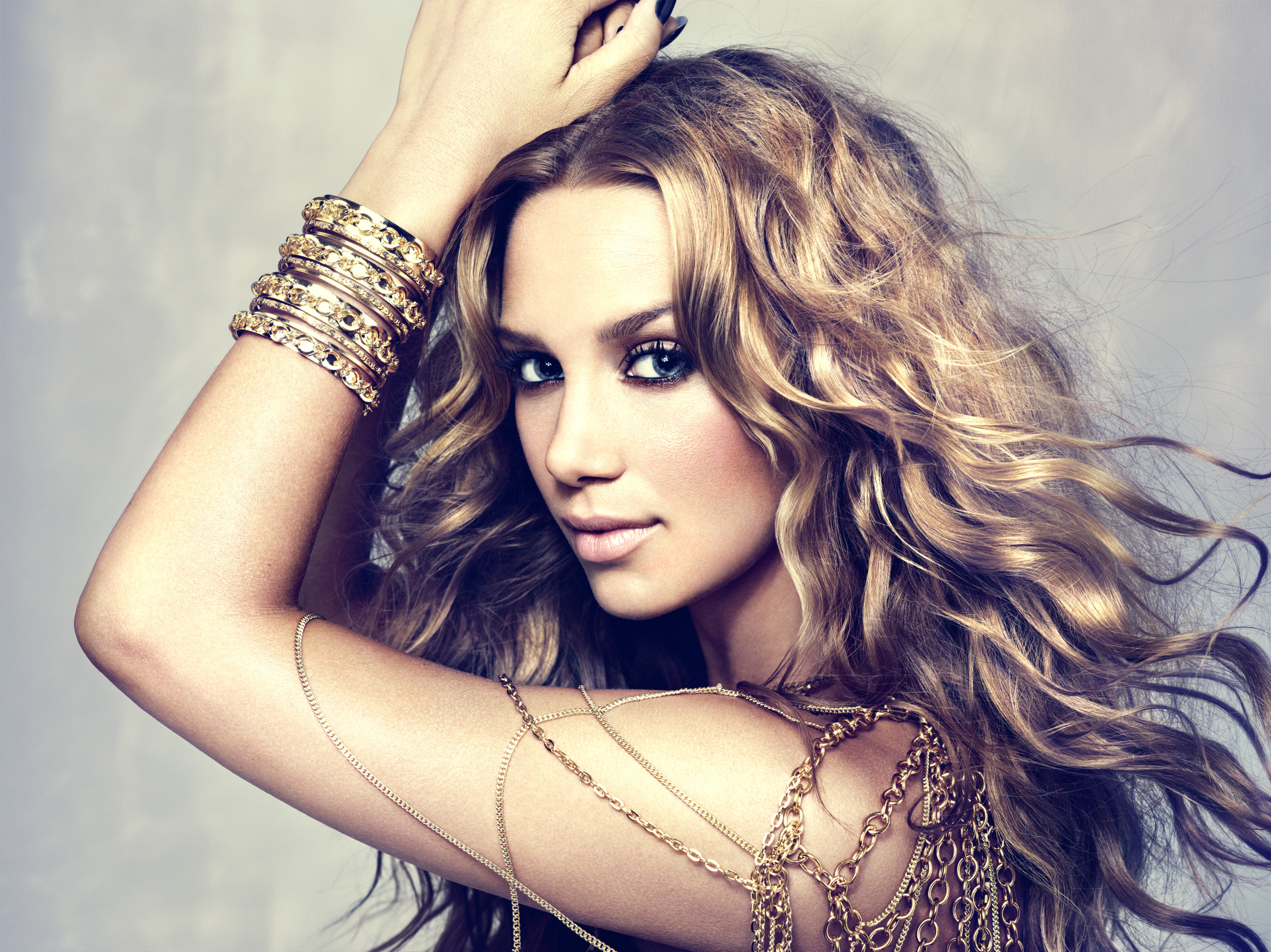
Agnes

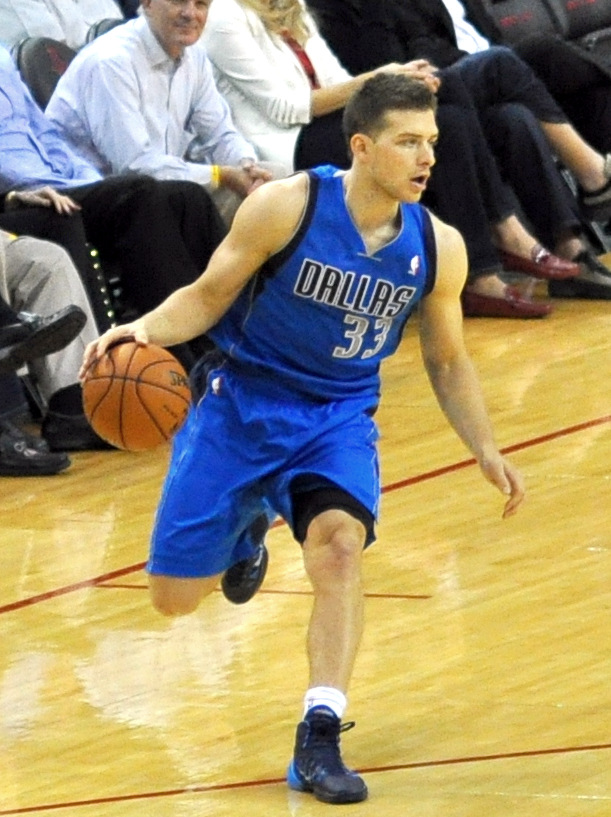
Gal Mekel

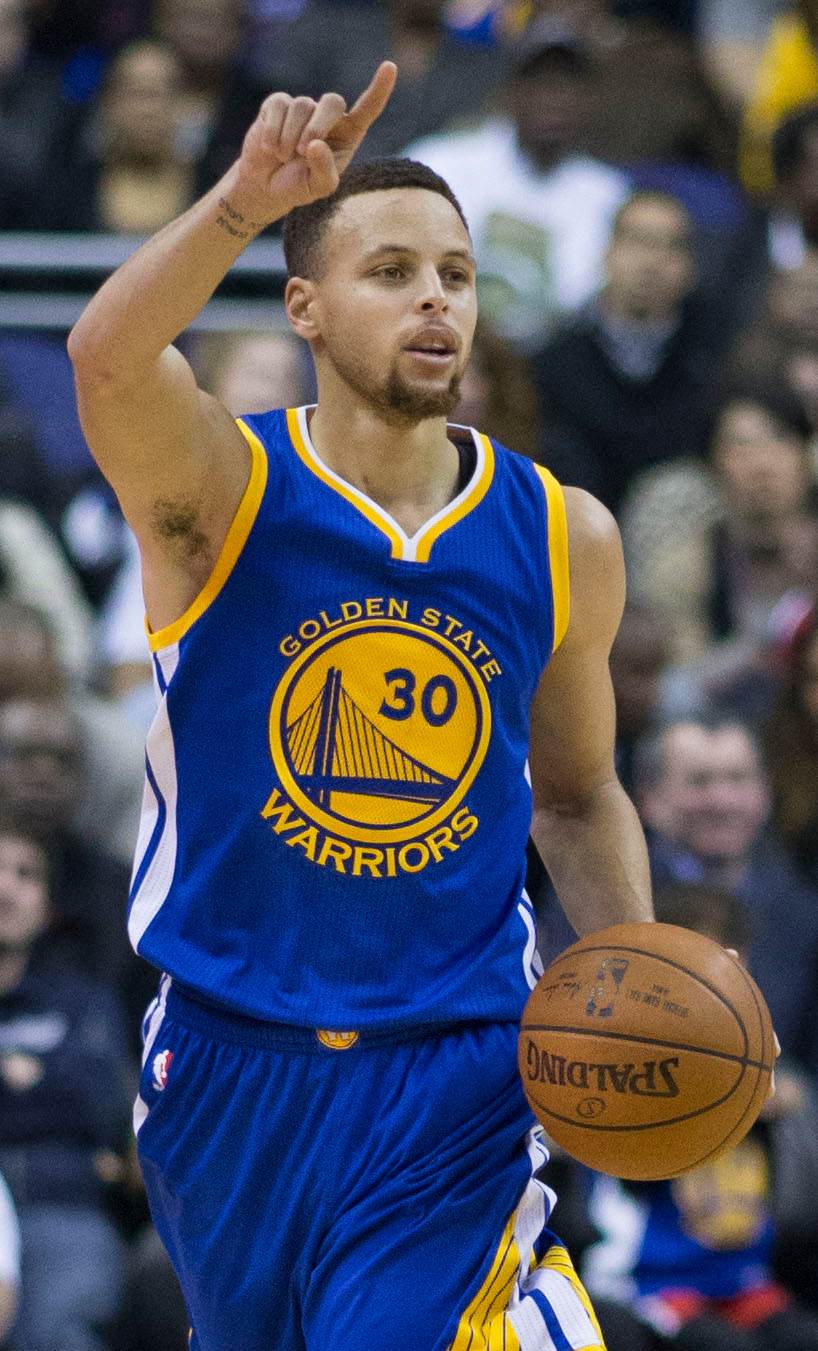
Stephen Curry

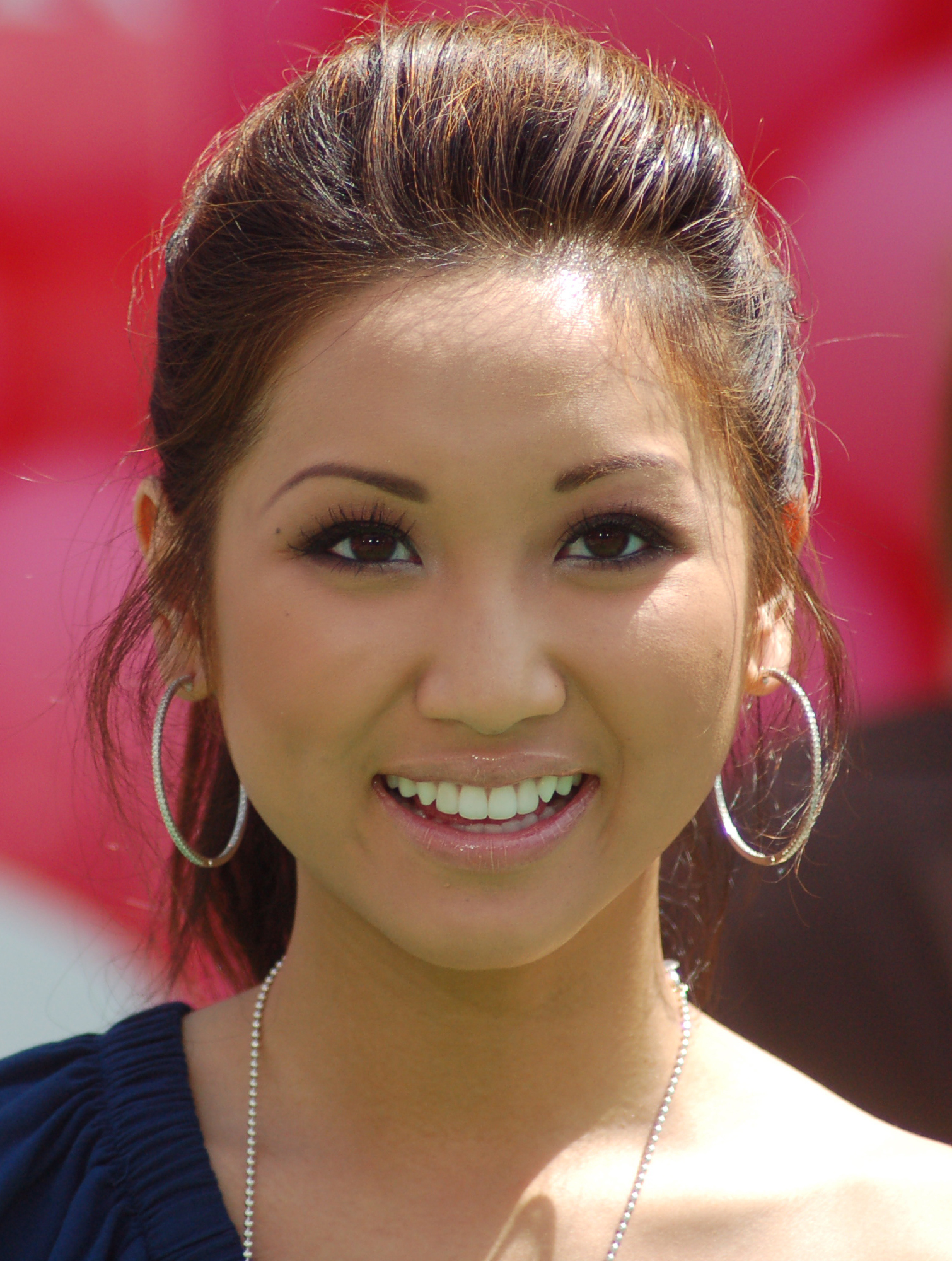
Brenda Song

- March 2 – Matthew Mitcham, Australian diver
- March 4
  - Gal Mekel, Israeli basketball player
  - Valentina Shevchenko, Kyrgyz born-Peruvian mixed martial artist
- March 6
  - Agnes, Swedish recording artist
  - Marina Erakovic, New Zealand tennis player
  - Simon Mignolet, Belgian footballer
  - Lee Seung-hoon, South Korean speed skater
- March 8 – Laura Unsworth, British field hockey player
- March 10 – Ivan Rakitić, Croatian and Swiss footballer
  - Ego Nwodim, American actress
- March 11 – Fábio Coentrão, Portuguese footballer
- March 14 – Stephen Curry, American basketball player
- March 16
  - Jhené Aiko, American singer-songwriter
  - Agustín Marchesín, Argentine footballer
- March 17 – Carrie Johnson, British media consultant and activist
- March 19
  - Clayton Kershaw, American baseball player
  - Zhou Lulu, Chinese weightlifter
  - Maxim Mikhaylov, Russian volleyball player
- March 20 – Alberto Bueno, Spanish footballer
- March 21 – Josepmir Ballón, Peruvian footballer
- March 23 – Jason Kenny, British cyclist
- March 27
  - Holliday Grainger, English actress
  - Jessie J, English singer-songwriter
  - Brenda Song, American actress
  - Atsuto Uchida, Japanese football player
- March 28 – Lacey Turner, English actress

=== April ===
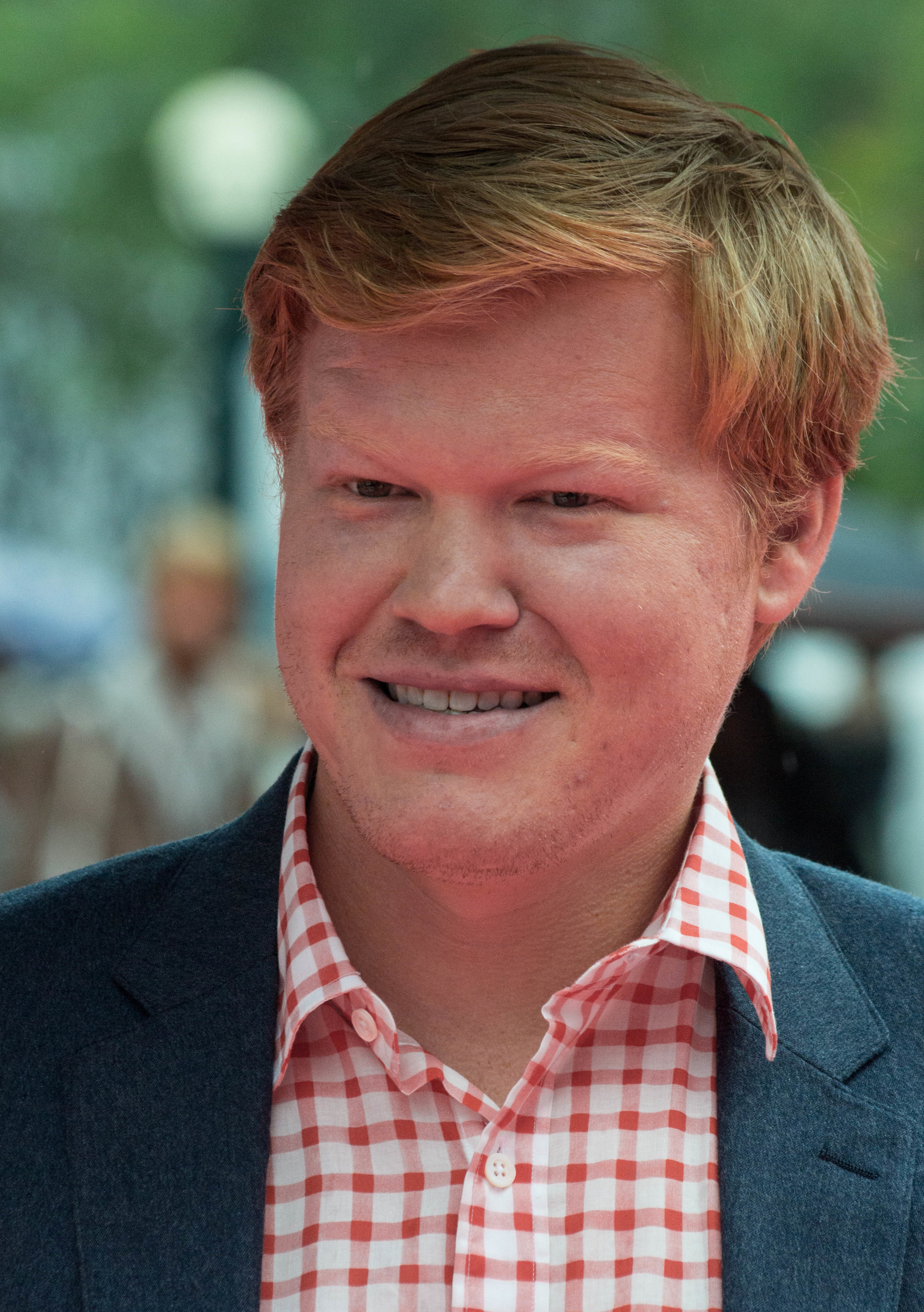
Jesse Plemons

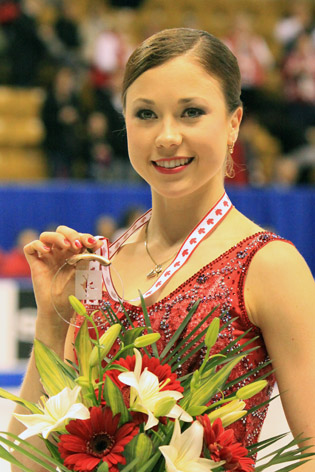
Laura Lepisto

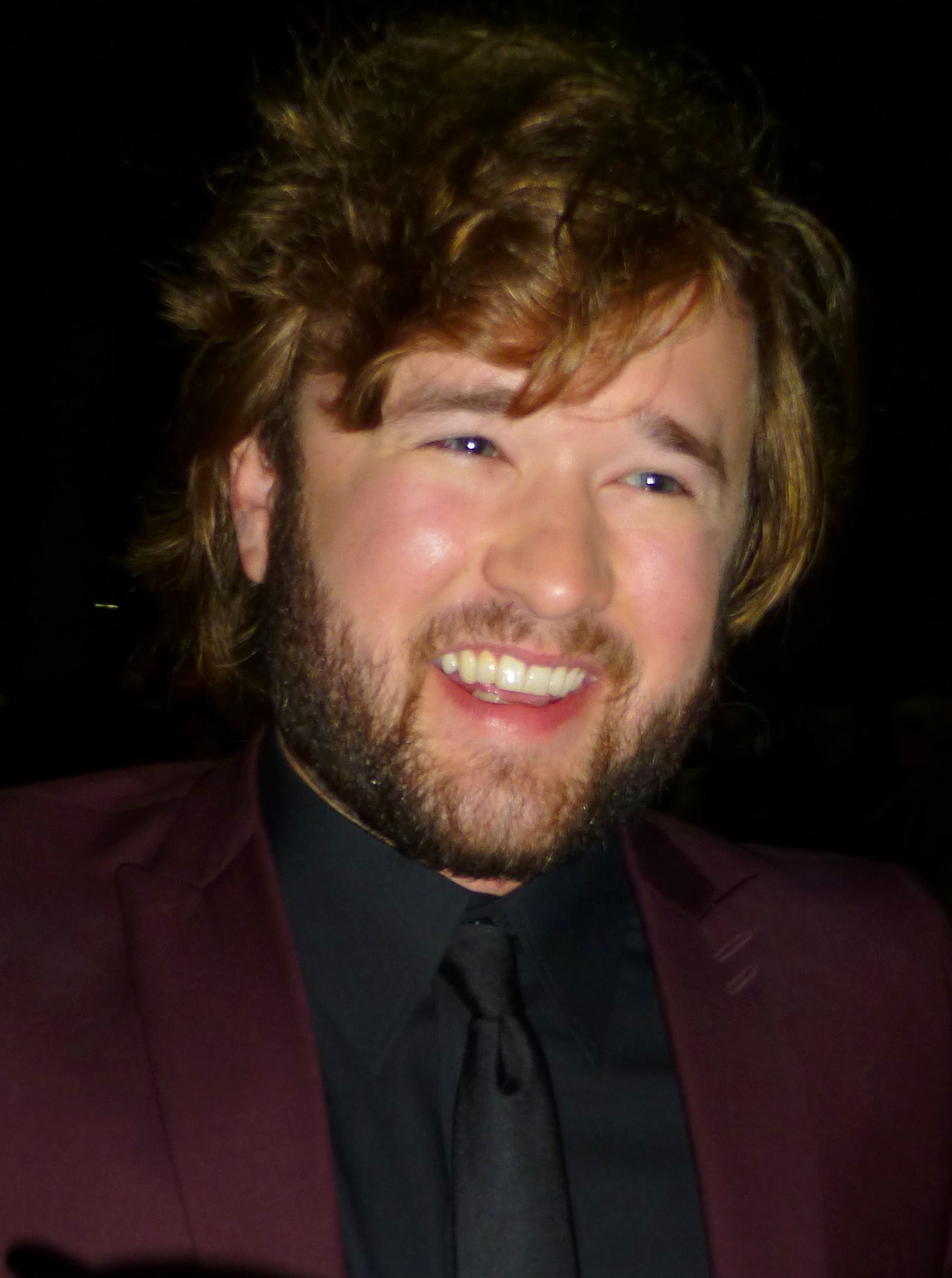
Haley Joel Osment

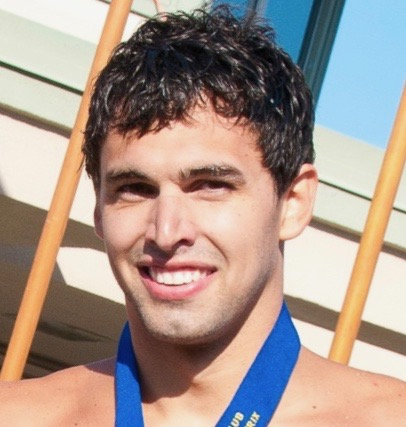
Ricky Berens

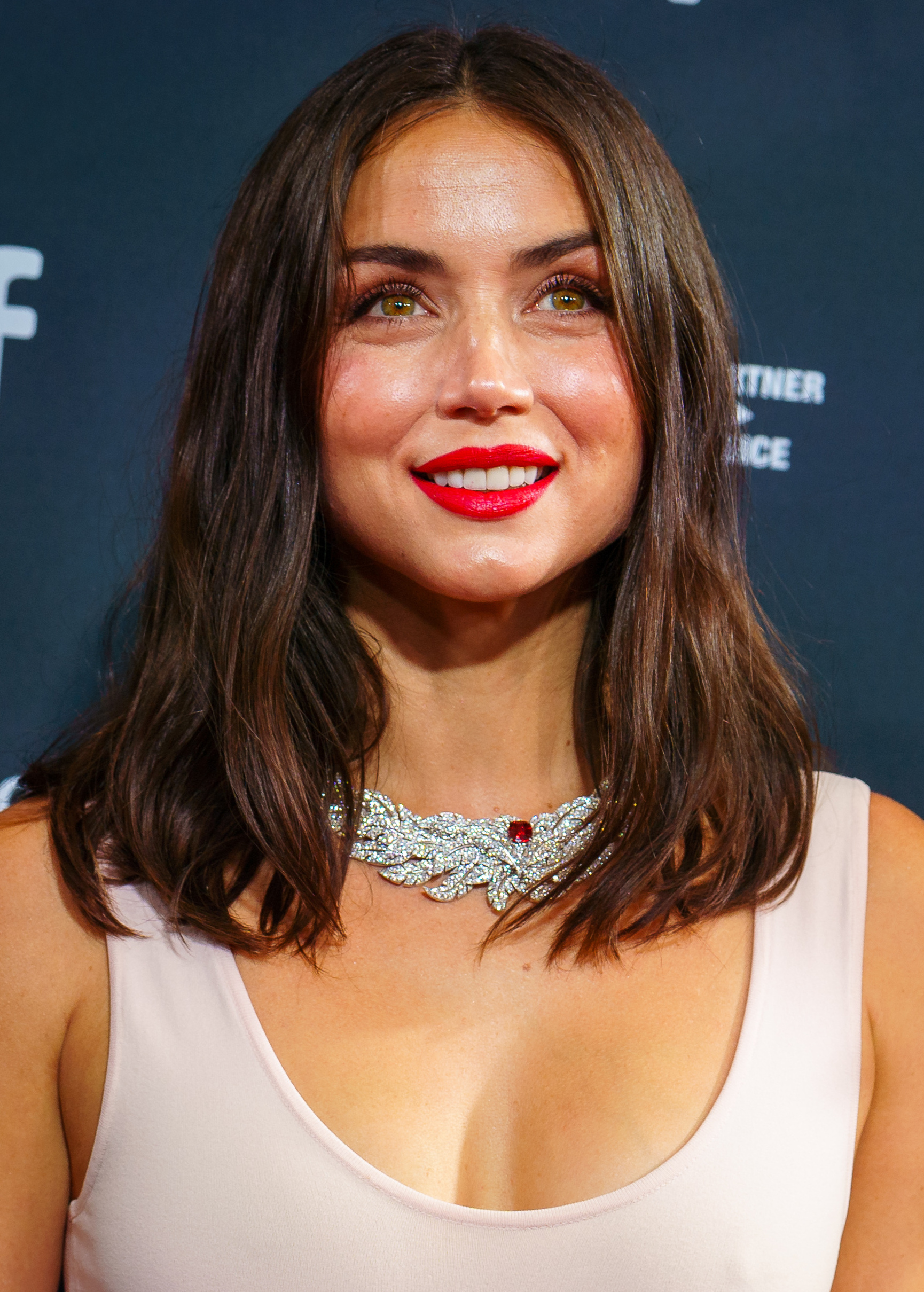
Ana de Armas

- April 2 – Jesse Plemons, American film and television actor
- April 5
  - Alisha Glass, American volleyball player
  - Daniela Luján, Mexican pop singer and actress
- April 6 – Fabrice Muamba, Democratic Congolese born-English football player and coach
- April 8 – Stephanie Cayo, Peruvian actress, singer and songwriter
- April 9 – Swara Bhasker, Indian actress
- April 10 – Haley Joel Osment, American actor
- April 12 – Lisa Unruh, German archer
- April 14 – Roberto Bautista Agut, Spanish tennis player
- April 18
  - Vanessa Kirby, English actress and model
  - Kayleigh McEnany, White House press secretary
- April 19 – Diego Buonanotte, Argentine footballer
- April 21 – Ricky Berens, American Olympic swimmer
- April 23
  - Victor Anichebe, Nigerian footballer
  - Alistair Brownlee, English triathlete
  - David Pocock, Australian politician and former rugby union player
- April 25 – Laura Lepisto, Finnish figure skater
- April 27
  - Lizzo, American singer-songwriter and rapper
  - Semyon Varlamov, Russian Ice Hockey player
- April 28
  - Juan Mata, Spanish footballer
  - Camila Vallejo, Chilean politician
- April 29 – Jonathan Toews, Canadian ice hockey player
- April 30 – Ana de Armas, Cuban actress

=== May ===
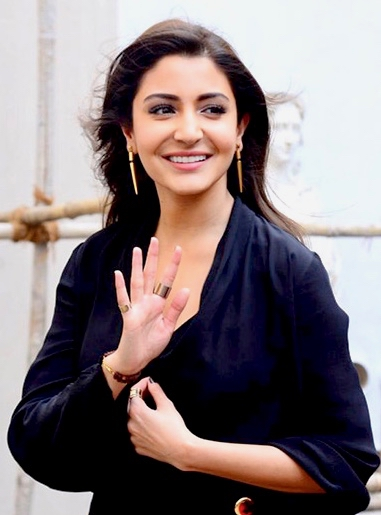
Anushka Sharma

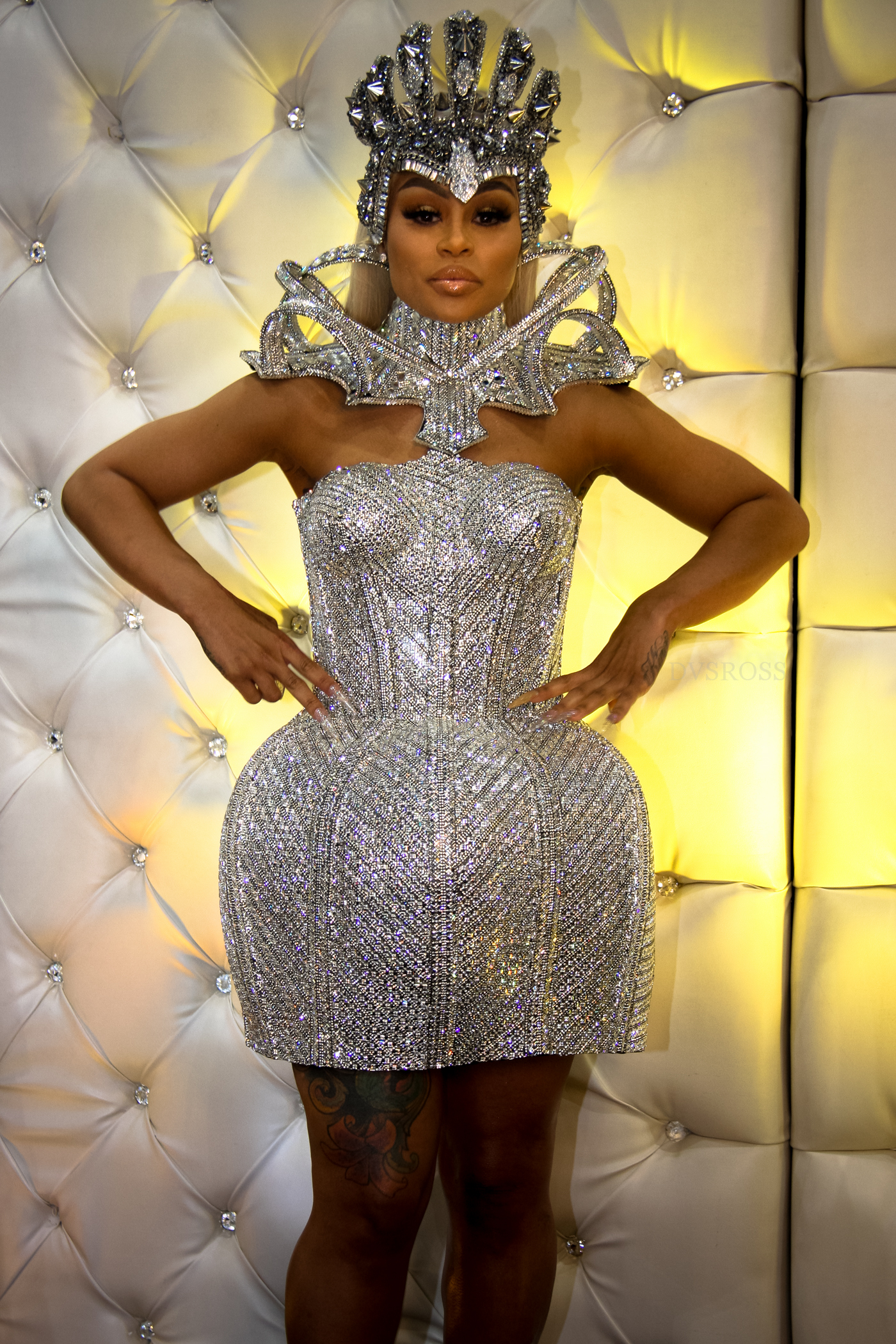
Blac Chyna

- May 1 – Anushka Sharma, Indian actress
- May 4 – Radja Nainggolan, Belgian footballer
- May 5 – Adele, British singer-songwriter
- May 6 – Dakota Kai, New Zealand professional wrestler
- May 7 – Ma Jin, Chinese badminton player
- May 8 – Timm Klose, Swiss footballer
- May 11
  - Ace Hood, American rapper
  - Blac Chyna, American model and entrepreneur
  - Brad Marchand, Canadian ice hockey player
- May 16 – Behati Prinsloo, Namibian model
- May 17 – Nikki Reed, American actress
- May 18 – Taeyang, South Korean recording artist and model
- May 21 – Park Gyu-ri, South Korean idol singer
- May 25 – Cameron van der Burgh, South African Olympic swimmer
- May 26
  - Juan Cuadrado, Colombian footballer
  - Dani Samuels, Australian discus thrower
- May 29 – Cheng Fei, Chinese gymnast
- May 29 – Tobin Heath, American women's soccer player
- May 30 – Amanda Nunes, Brazilian mixed martial artist

=== June ===
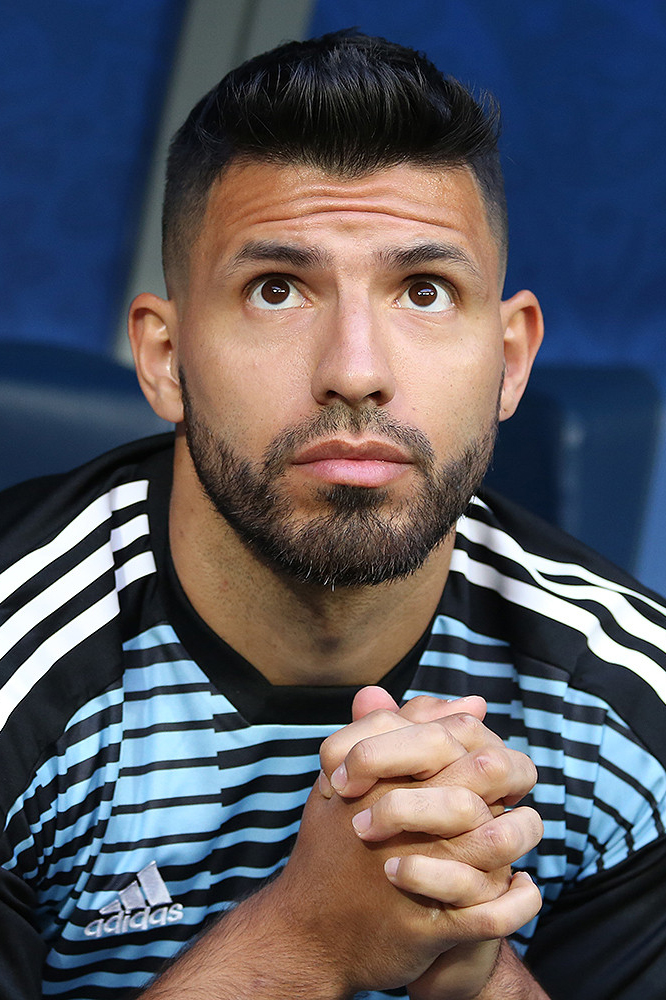
Sergio Agüero

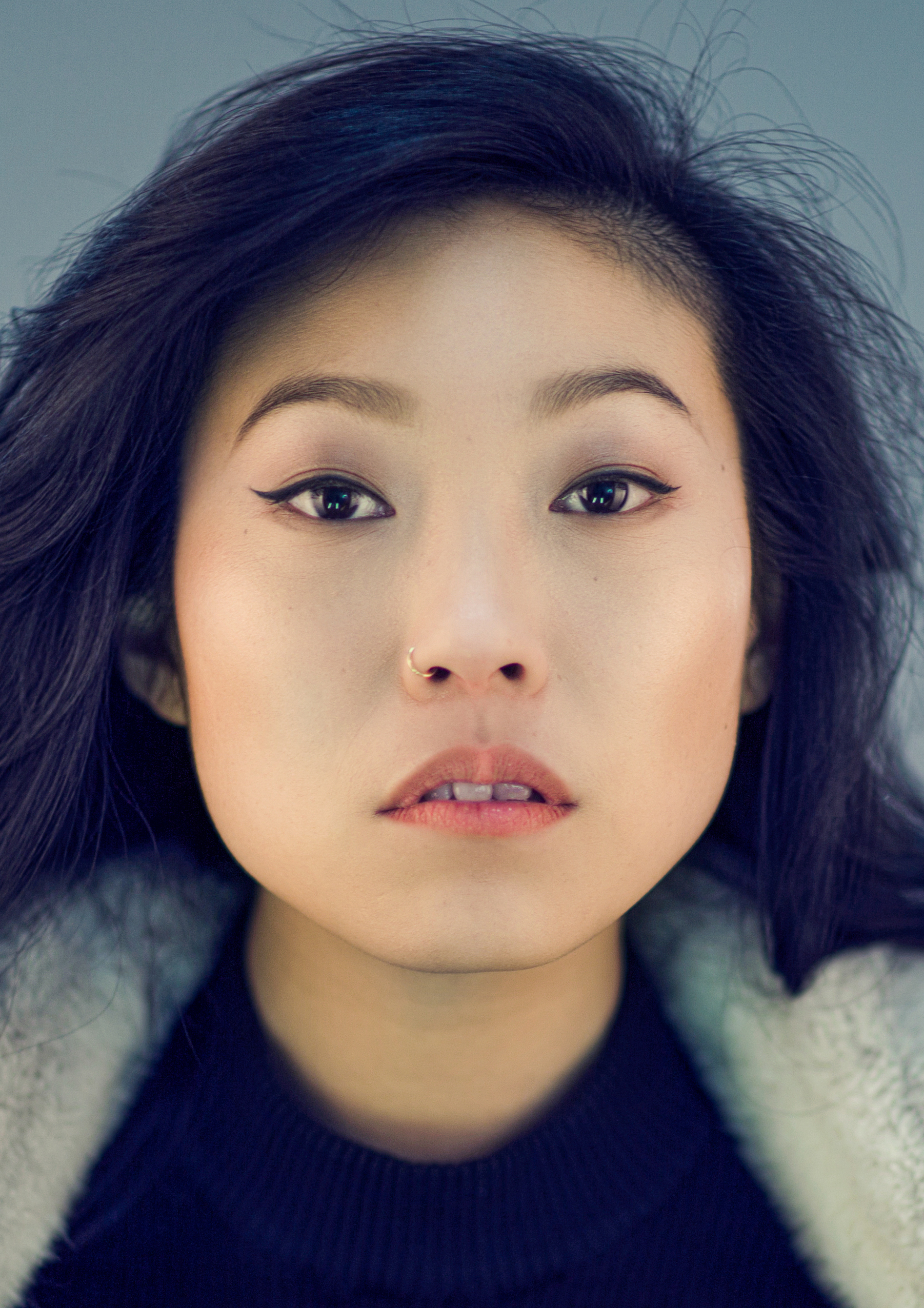
Awkwafina

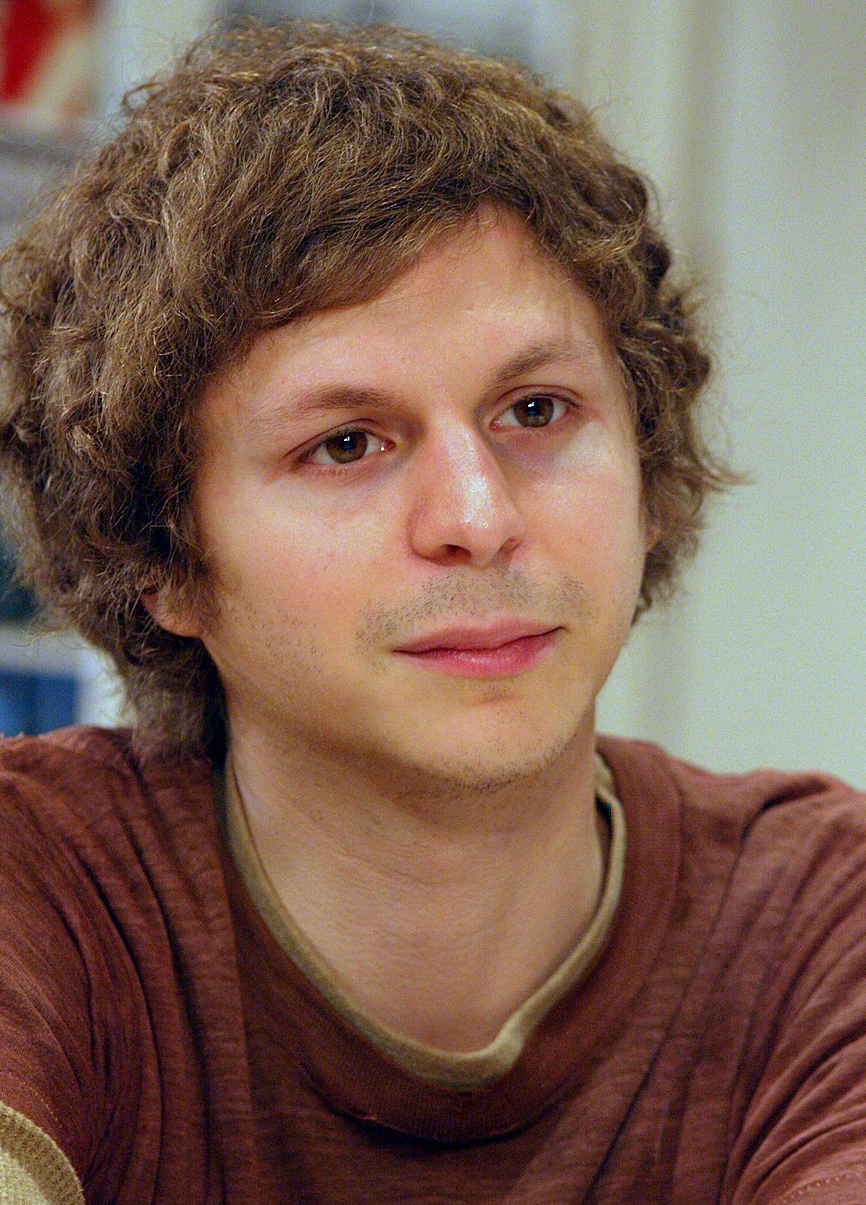
Michael Cera

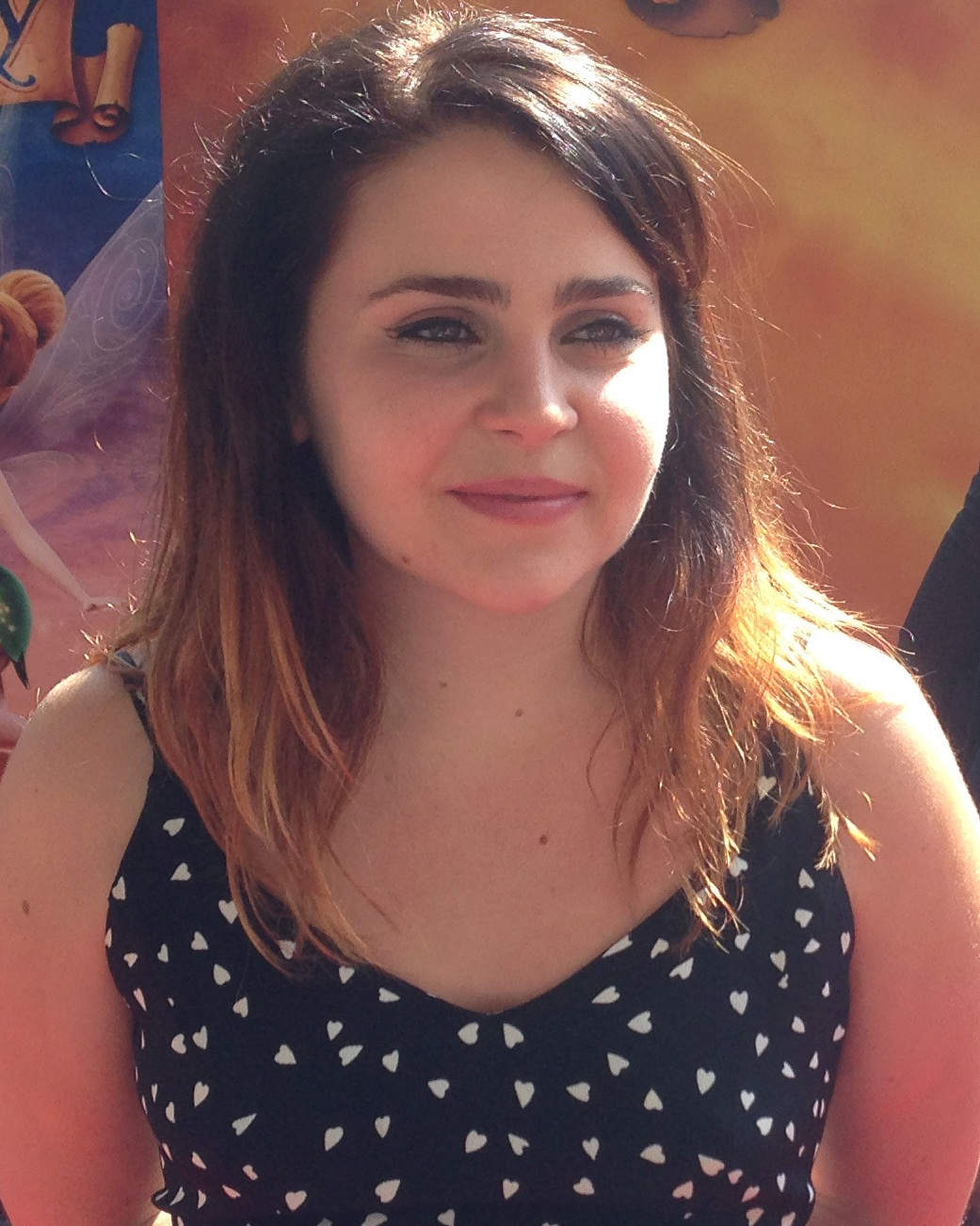
Mae Whitman

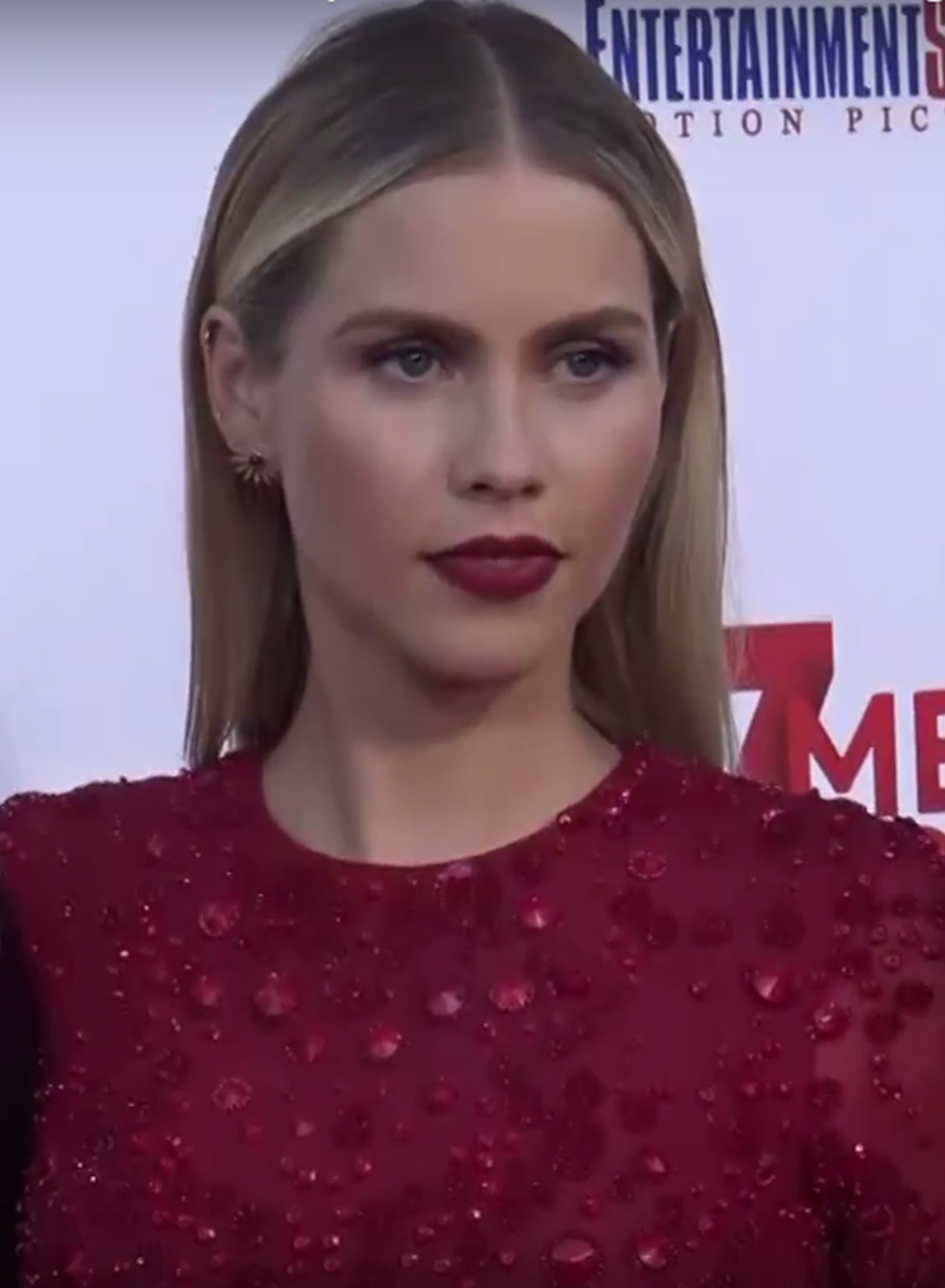
Claire Holt

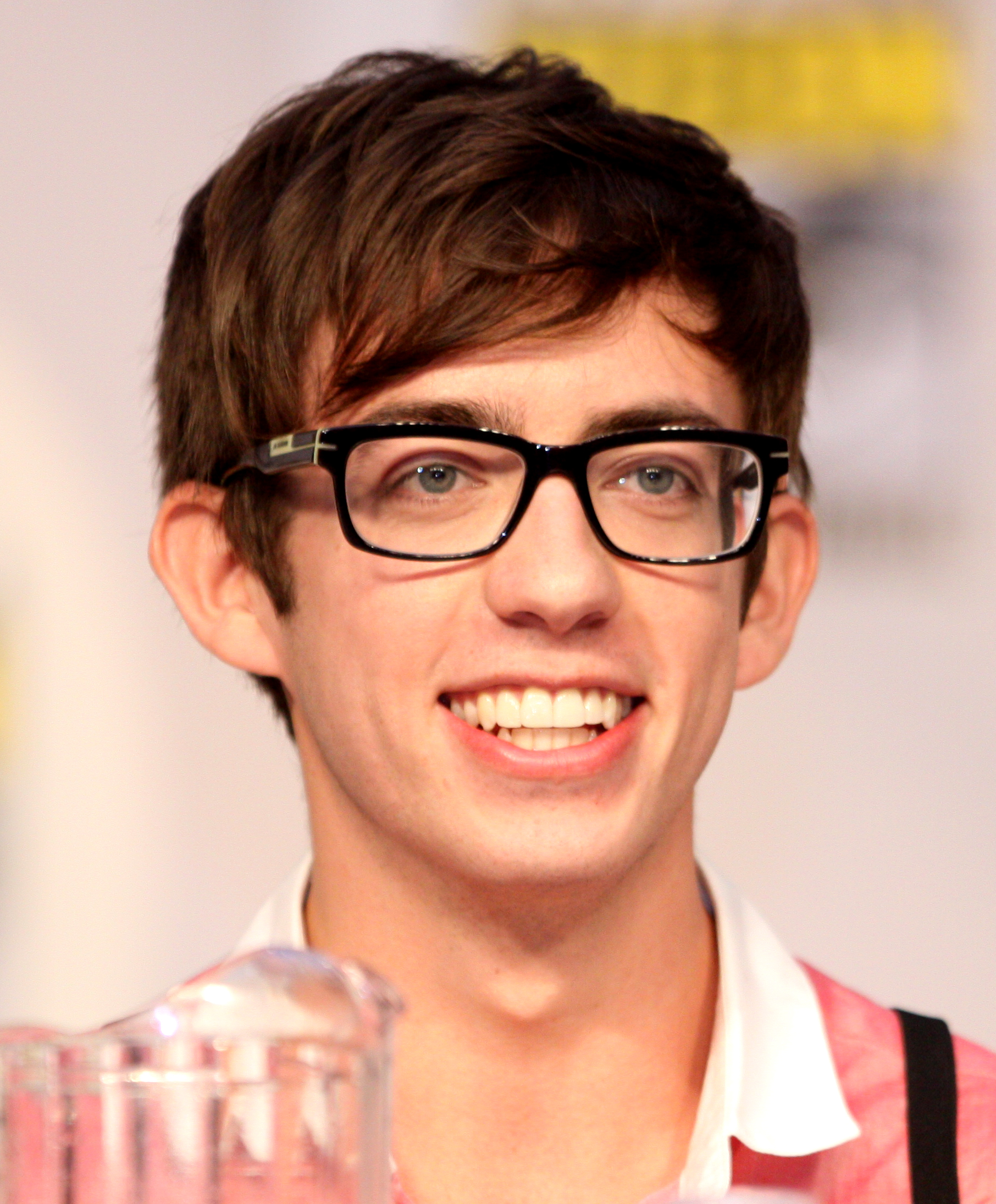
Kevin McHale

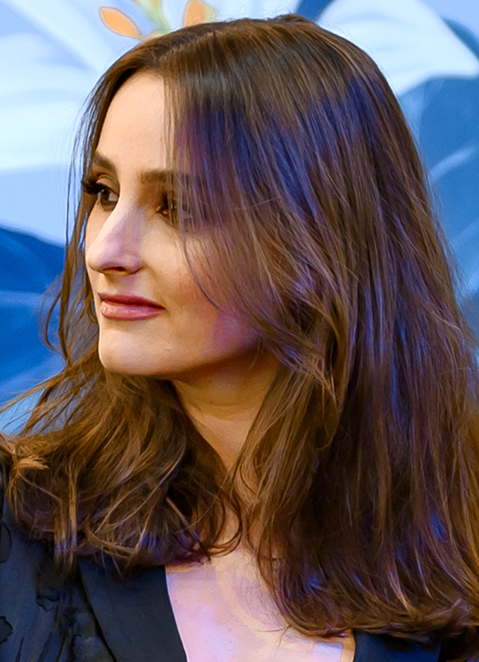
Banks

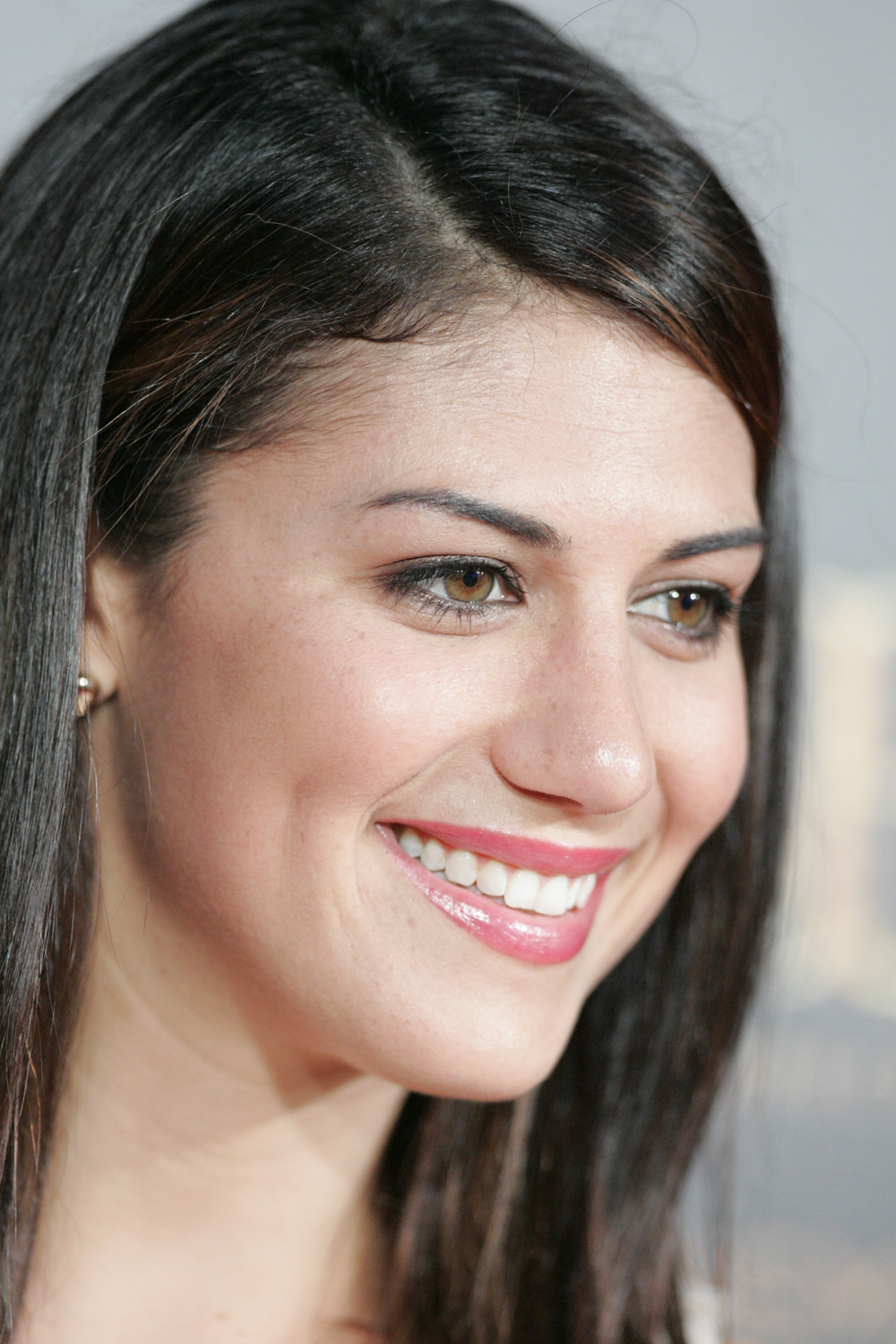
Stephanie Rice

- June 1 – Javier Hernández, Mexican footballer
- June 2
  - Sergio Agüero, Argentine footballer
  - Amber Marshall, Canadian actress
  - Awkwafina, American actress
- June 4 – Marie Gluesenkamp Perez, American politician
- June 6 – Arianna Errigo, Italian fencer
- June 7
  - Michael Cera, Canadian actor, comedian, producer and singer-songwriter
  - Ekaterina Makarova, Russian tennis player
  - Milan Lucic, Canadian ice hockey player
- June 8
  - Lisa Brennauer, German cyclist
  - Frédéric Julan, French boxer
- June 9
  - Mae Whitman, American actress, voice actress and singer
  - Sokratis Papastathopoulos, Greek footballer
- June 11 – Claire Holt, Australian actress
- June 12
  - Eren Derdiyok, Swiss footballer
  - Mauricio Isla, Chilean footballer
- June 14 – Kevin McHale, American actor, dancer and singer
- June 16
  - Banks, American singer-songwriter
  - Thierry Neuville, Belgian rally driver
- June 17 – Stephanie Rice, Australian swimmer
- June 18 – Josh Dun, American drummer
- June 19 – Jacob deGrom, American baseball player
- June 20 – May J., Japanese singer
- June 22
  - Portia Doubleday, American actress
  - Dean Furman, South African footballer
- June 23 – Chellsie Memmel, American gymnast
- June 25 – Therese Johaug, Norwegian cross-country skier
- June 27
  - Célia Šašić, German footballer
  - Matthew Spiranovic, Australian soccer player
- June 29 – Éver Banega, Argentine footballer

=== July ===
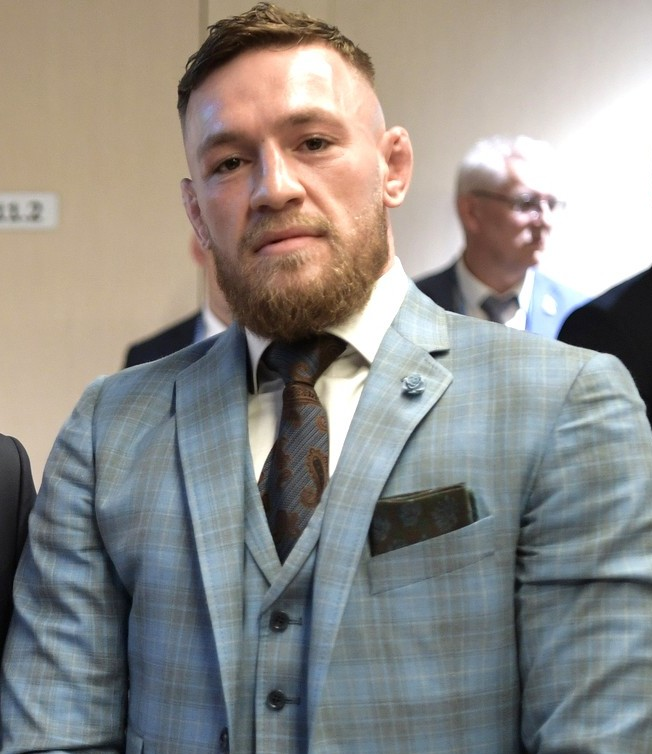
Conor McGregor

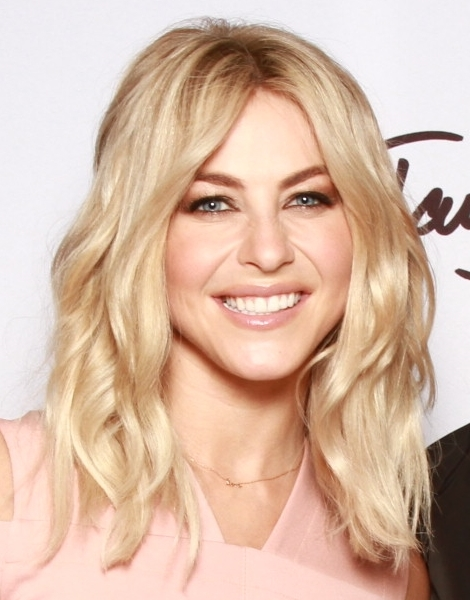
Julianne Hough

- July 1 – Aleksander Lesun, Russian modern pentathlete
- July 2 – Lee Chung-yong, South Korean footballer
- July 4 – Angelique Boyer, French-Mexican actress and singer
- July 5 – Samir Ujkani, Albanian-Kosovan footballer
- July 10
  - Maja Alm, Danish orienteering and Athletics competitor
  - Sarkodie, Ghanaian hip hop artist
- July 12
  - Melissa O'Neil, Canadian actress
- July 13
  - Colton Haynes, American actor and model
  - Tulisa Contostavlos, British singer-songwriter
- July 14 – Conor McGregor, Irish mixed martial artist
- July 16
  - Eric Johannesen, German rower
  - Sergio Busquets, Spanish footballer
- July 19 – Popcaan, Jamaican singer
- July 20 – Julianne Hough, American ballroom dancer, country music singer and actress
- July 21 – DeAndre Jordan, American basketball player
- July 22 – Noriko Senge, Japanese princess
- July 24 – Han Seung-yeon, South Korean singer and actress
- July 25 – Paulinho, Brazilian footballer
- July 26 – Francia Raisa, American actress

=== August ===
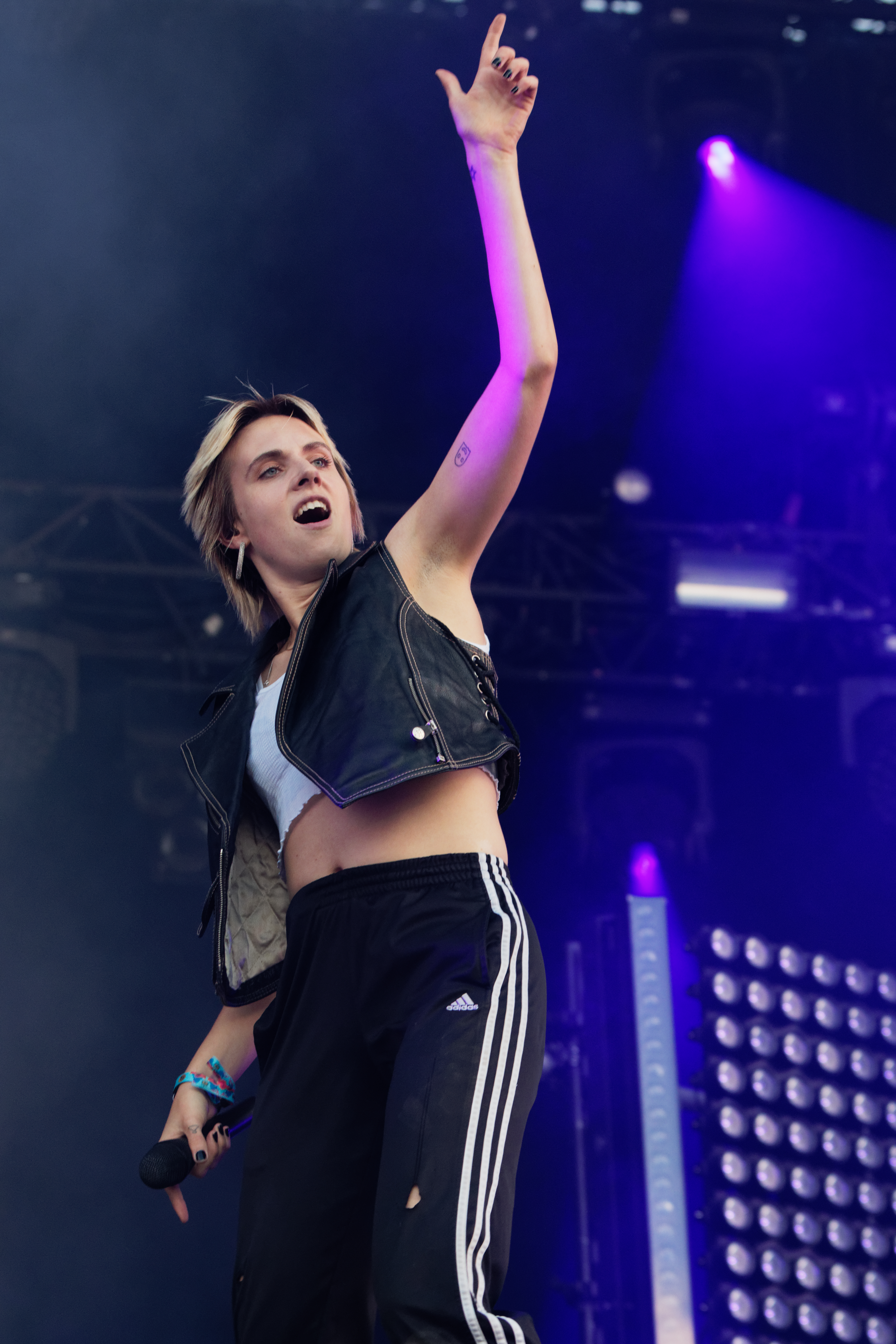
MØ

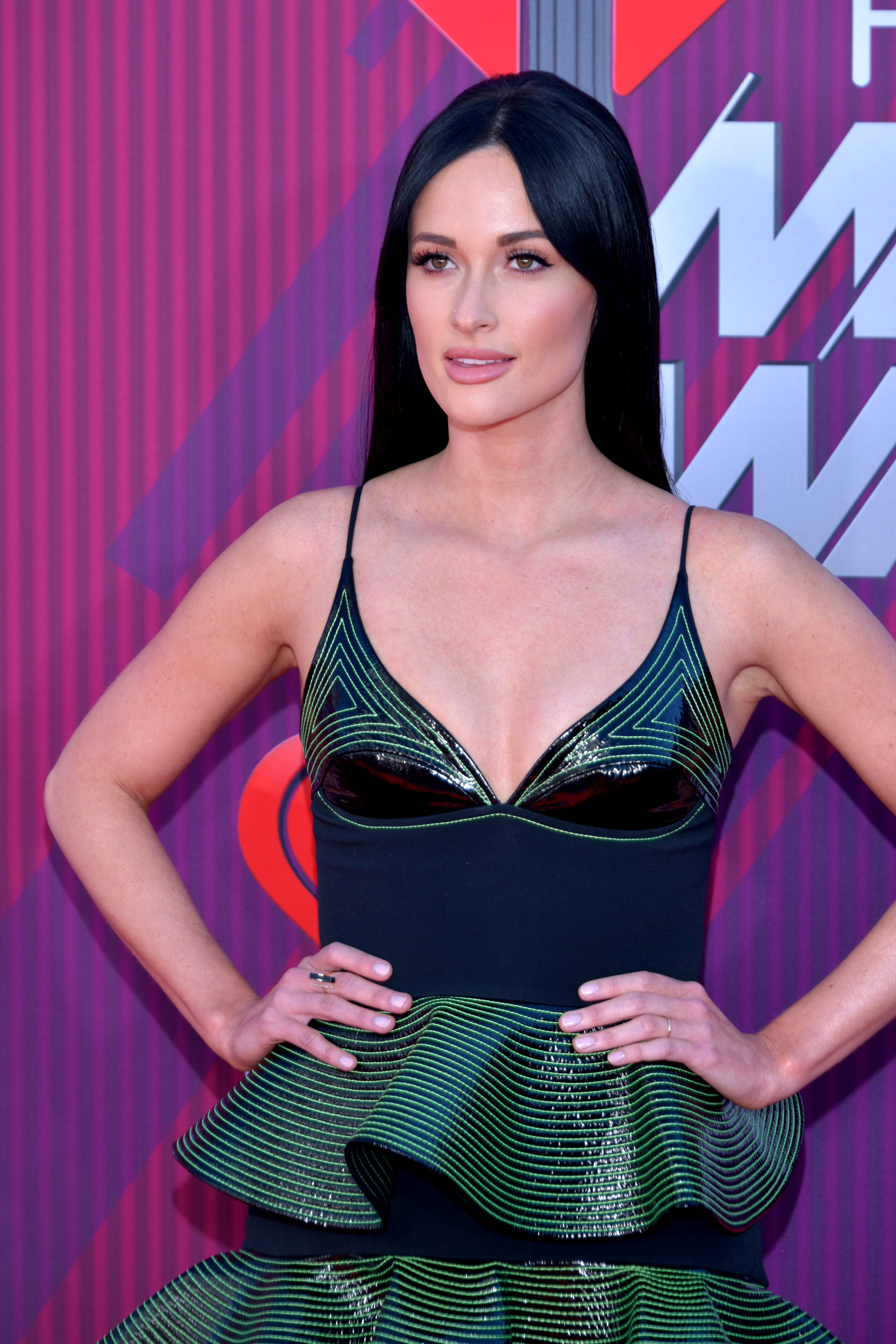
Kacey Musgraves

- August 1 – Nemanja Matić, Serbian footballer
- August 2 – Rocío Sánchez Moccia, Argentine field hockey player
- August 5
  - Mizuki Fujii, Japanese badminton player
  - Federica Pellegrini, Italian swimmer
- August 8
  - Princess Beatrice, British princess
  - Agata Sobczyk, Polish economist and politician
- August 9 – Willian, Brazilian footballer
- August 11
  - Irfan Bachdim, Indonesian footballer
  - Patty Mills, Australian basketball player
- August 12 – Tyson Fury, British boxer
- August 13 – MØ, Danish singer
- August 14 – Kayla Mueller, American human rights activist (d.2015)
- August 18
  - G-Dragon, South Korean rapper, singer-songwriter and fashion icon
  - Katarina Ivanovska, Macedonian model and actress
- August 19
  - Veronica Roth, American novelist and short story writer
  - Cristina Scuccia, Italian singer
- August 21
  - Kacey Musgraves, American country music artist
  - Robert Lewandowski, Polish footballer
- August 23 – Mikhail Aloyan, Russian boxer
- August 25
  - Alexandra Burke, English singer
  - Giga Chikadze, Georgian mixed martial artist
- August 26
  - Evan Ross, American actor and musician
  - Danielle Savre, American actress
- August 28 – Rosie MacLennan, Canadian trampoline gymnast
- August 29 – Bartosz Kurek, Polish volleyball player

=== September ===
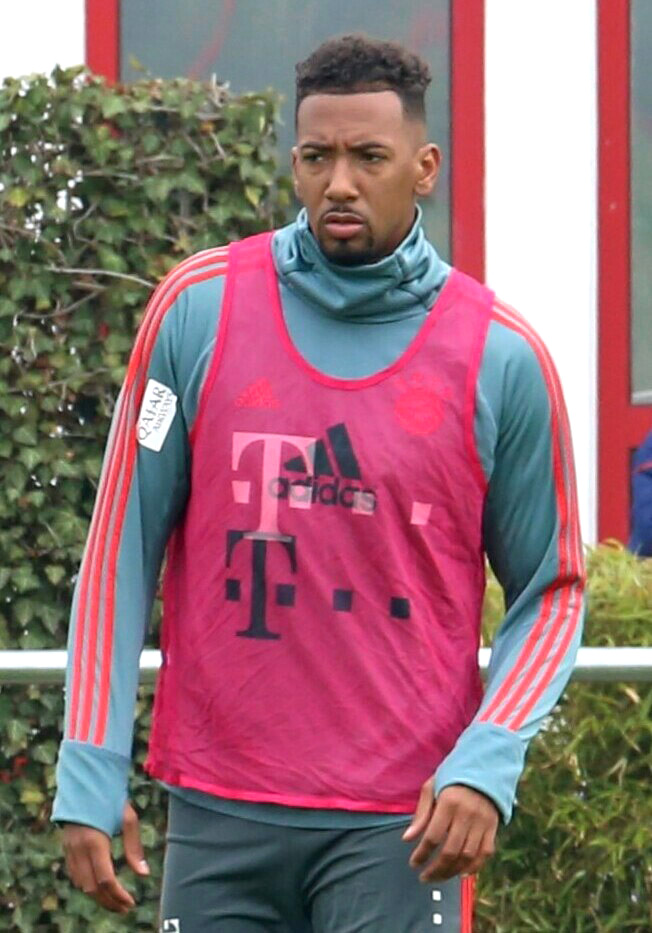
Jérôme Boateng

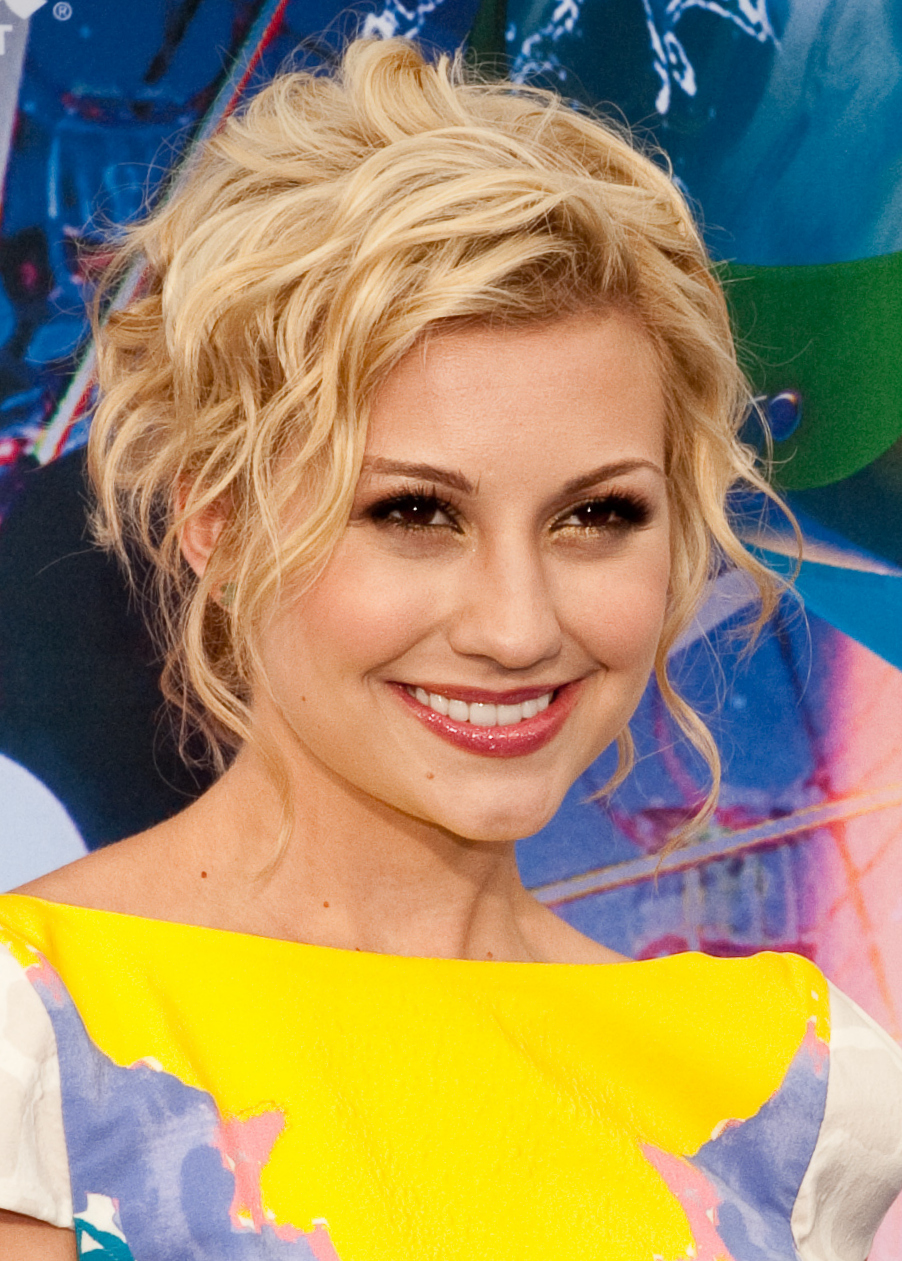
Chelsea Kane

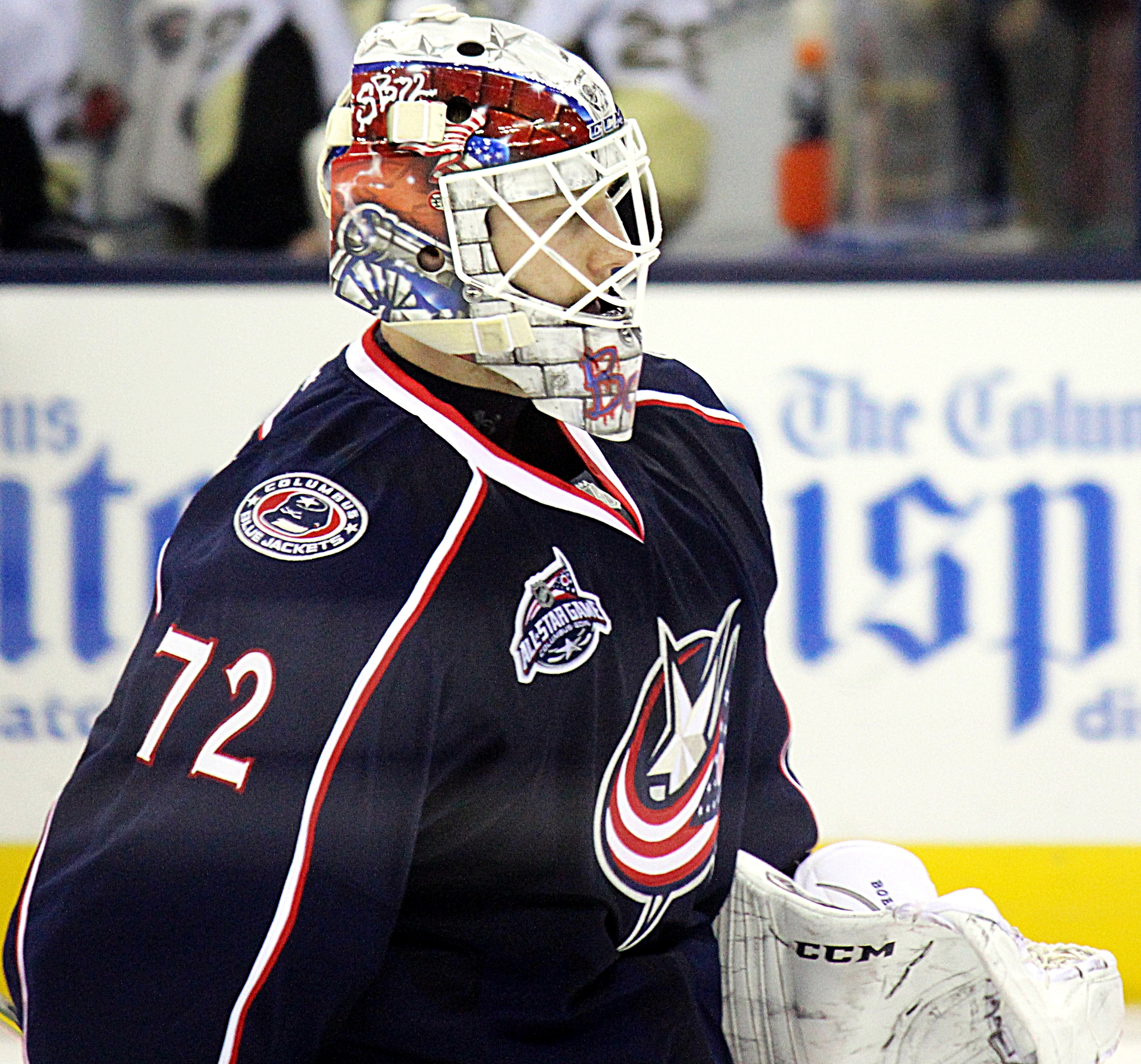
Sergei Bobrovsky

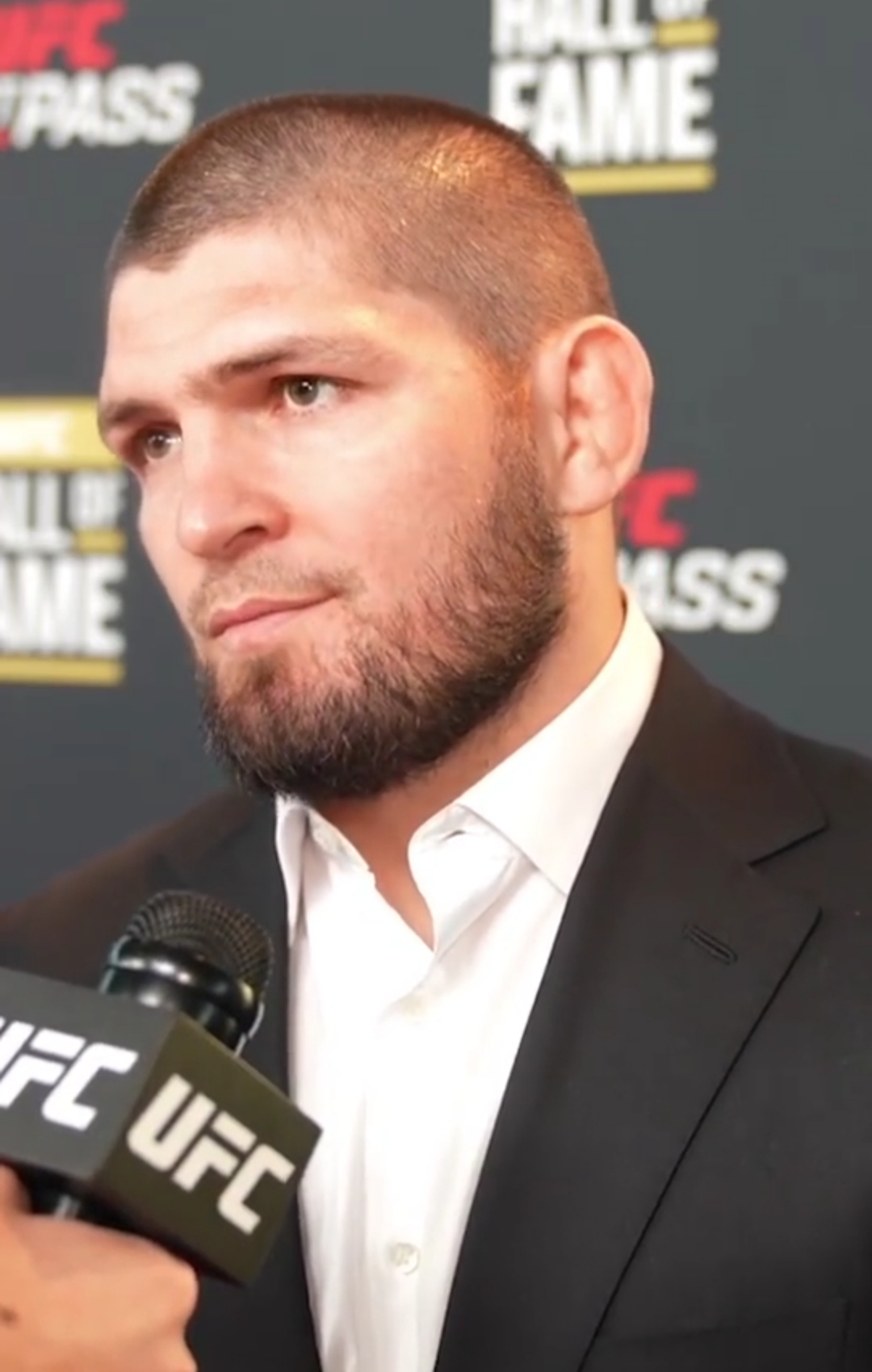
Khabib Nurmagomedov

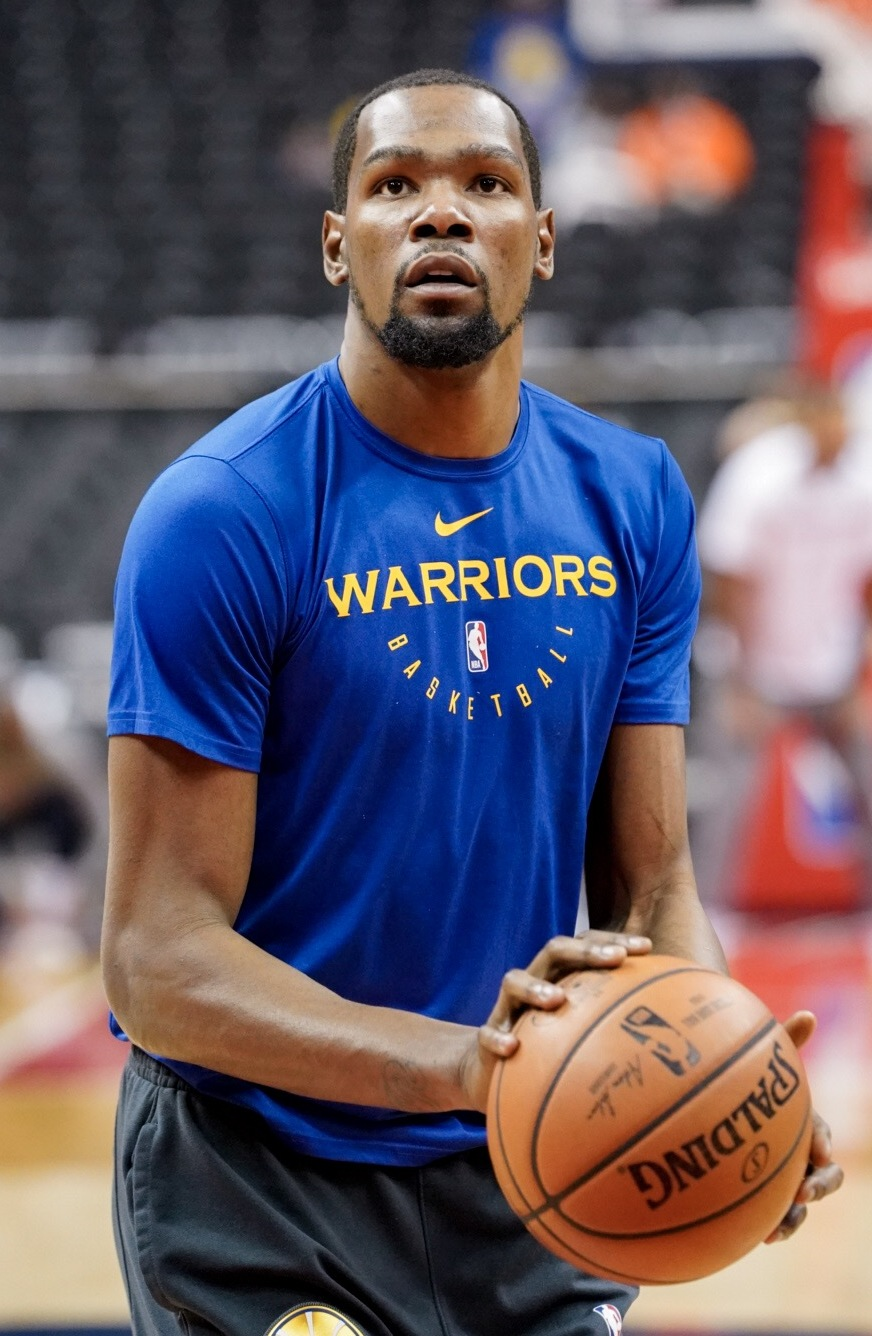
Kevin Durant

- September 1 – Simona de Silvestro, Swiss racing driver
- September 2 – Ishant Sharma, Indian cricketer
- September 5 – Nuri Şahin, Turkish footballer
- September 6 – Sargun Mehta, Indian model, comedian, dancer, presenter and actress
- September 7 – Kevin Love, American basketball player
- September 8 – Roy van den Berg, Dutch track cyclist
- September 10 – Coco Rocha, Canadian fashion model
- September 11 – Lee Yong-dae, South Korean male badminton player
- September 12 – Prachi Desai, Indian film and television actress
- September 13 – Eva-Maria Brem, Austrian alpine skier
- September 14 – Martin Fourcade, French biathlete
- September 16 – Michael Ollis, United States Army Medal of Honor recipient (d. 2013)
- September 20
  - Sergei Bobrovsky, Russian Ice Hockey player
  - Khabib Nurmagomedov, Russian mixed martial artist
- September 21 – Bilawal Bhutto Zardari, Pakistani politician
- September 23 – Juan Martín del Potro, Argentine tennis player
- September 26
  - James Blake, English electronic music producer and singer-songwriter
  - Kiira Korpi, Finnish figure skater
  - Wei Qiuyue, Chinese volleyball player
- September 27 – Alma, French singer-songwriter
- September 28 – Marin Čilić, Croatian tennis player
- September 29
  - Kevin Durant, American basketball player
  - Maurício Souza, Brazilian volleyball player and politician
  - Alexander Volkanovski, Australian mixed martial artist and boxer

=== October ===
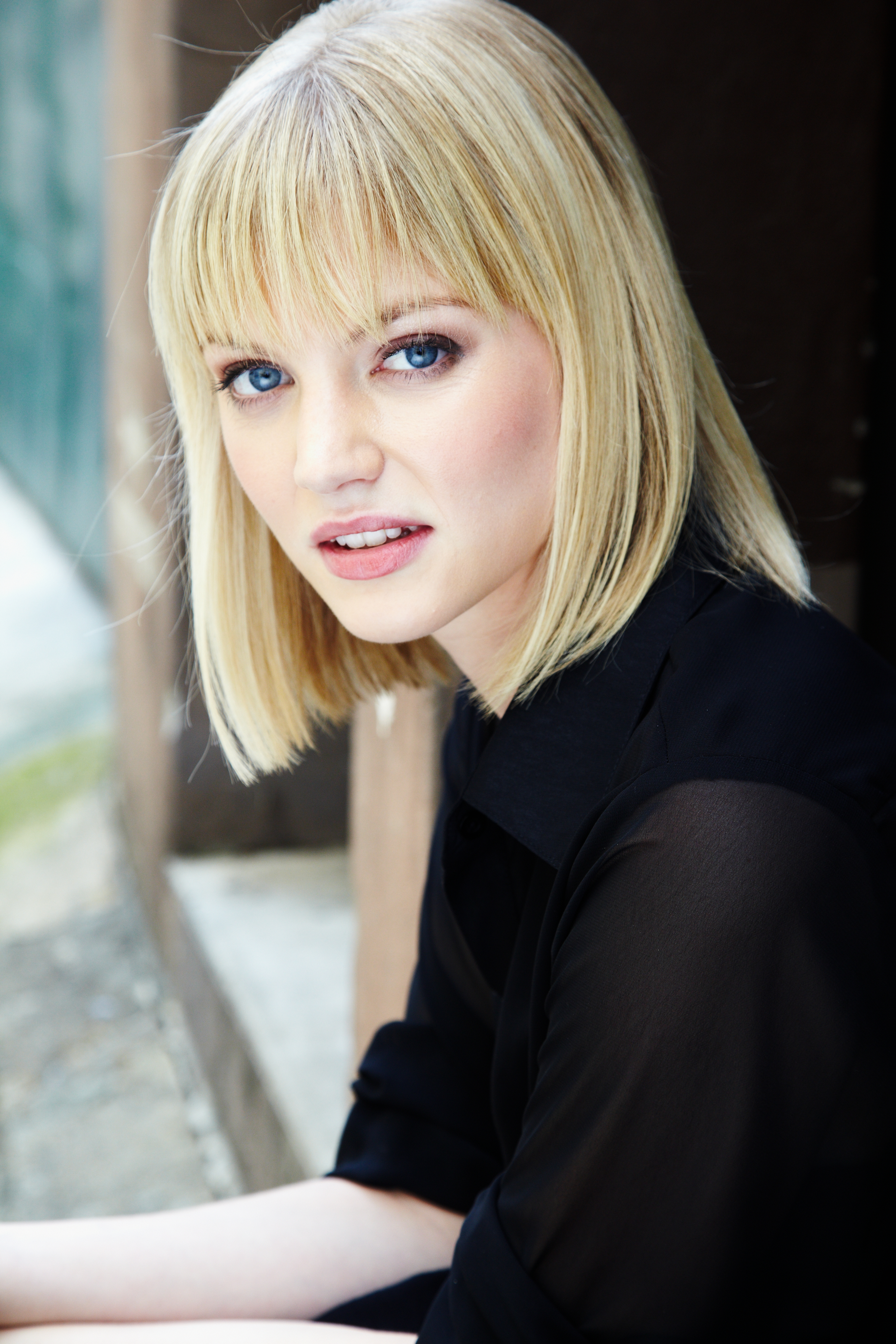
Cariba Heine

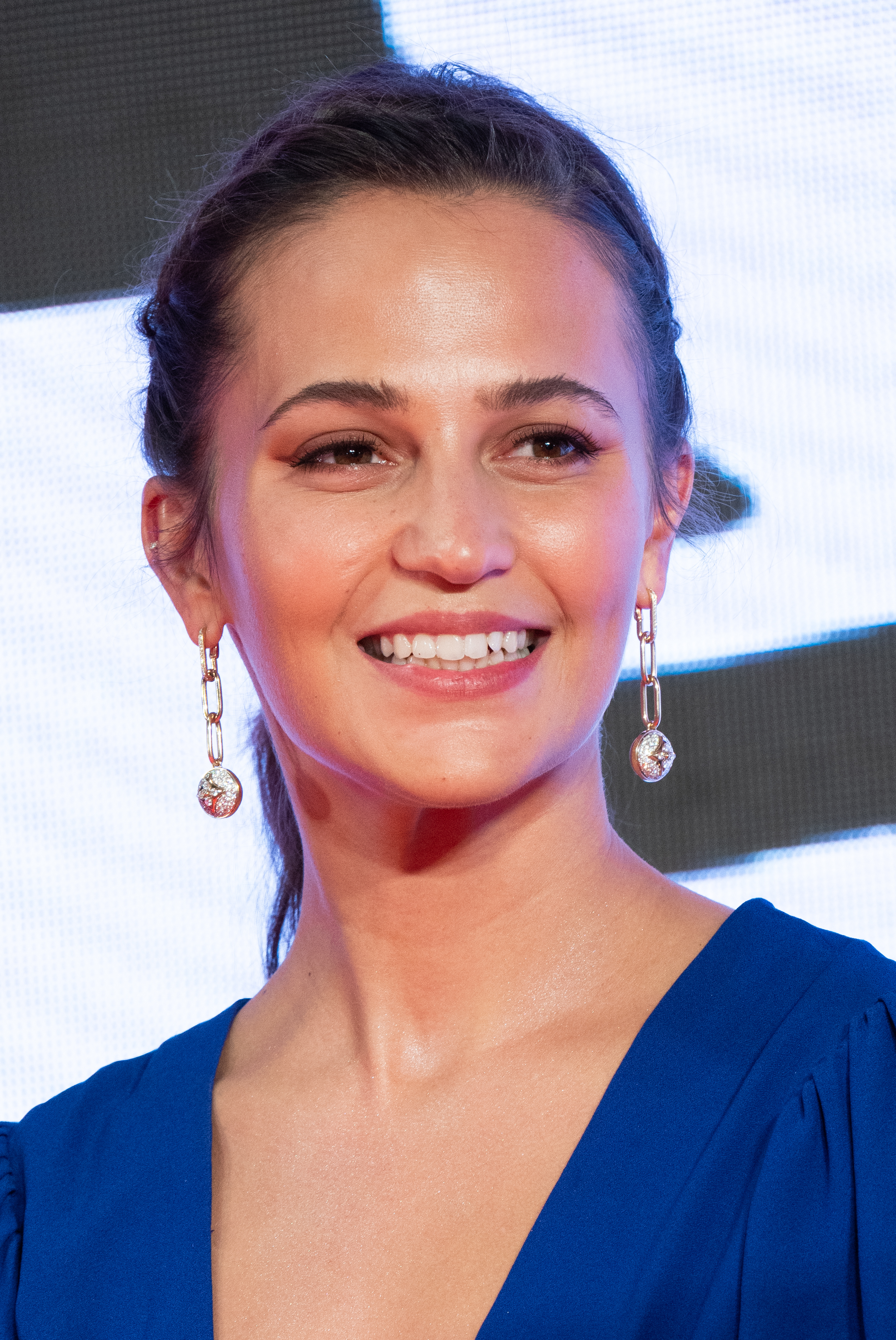
Alicia Vikander

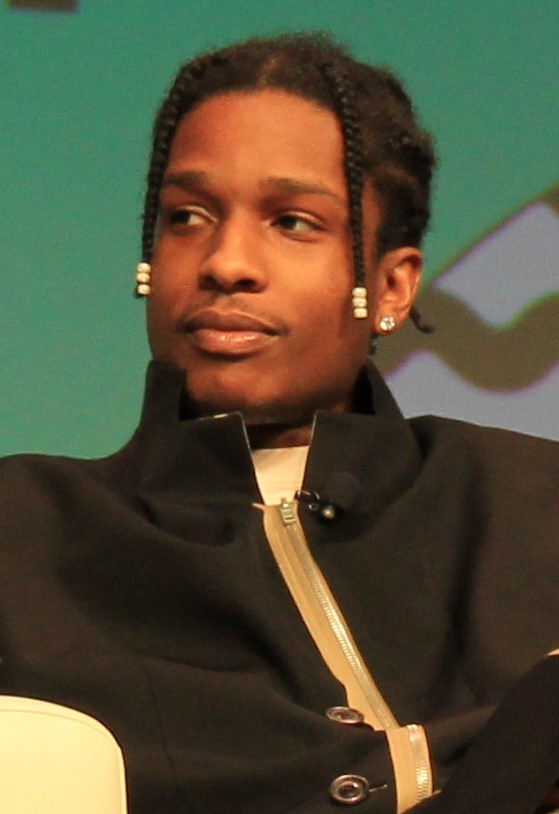
ASAP Rocky

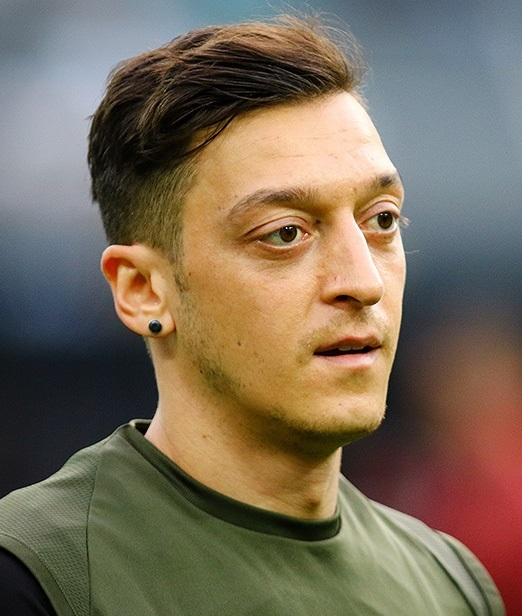
Mesut Özil

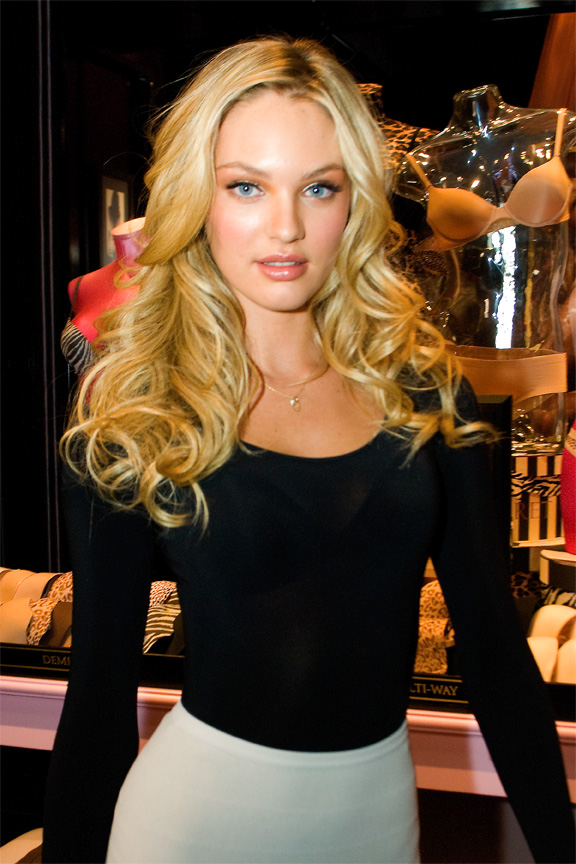
Candice Swanepoel

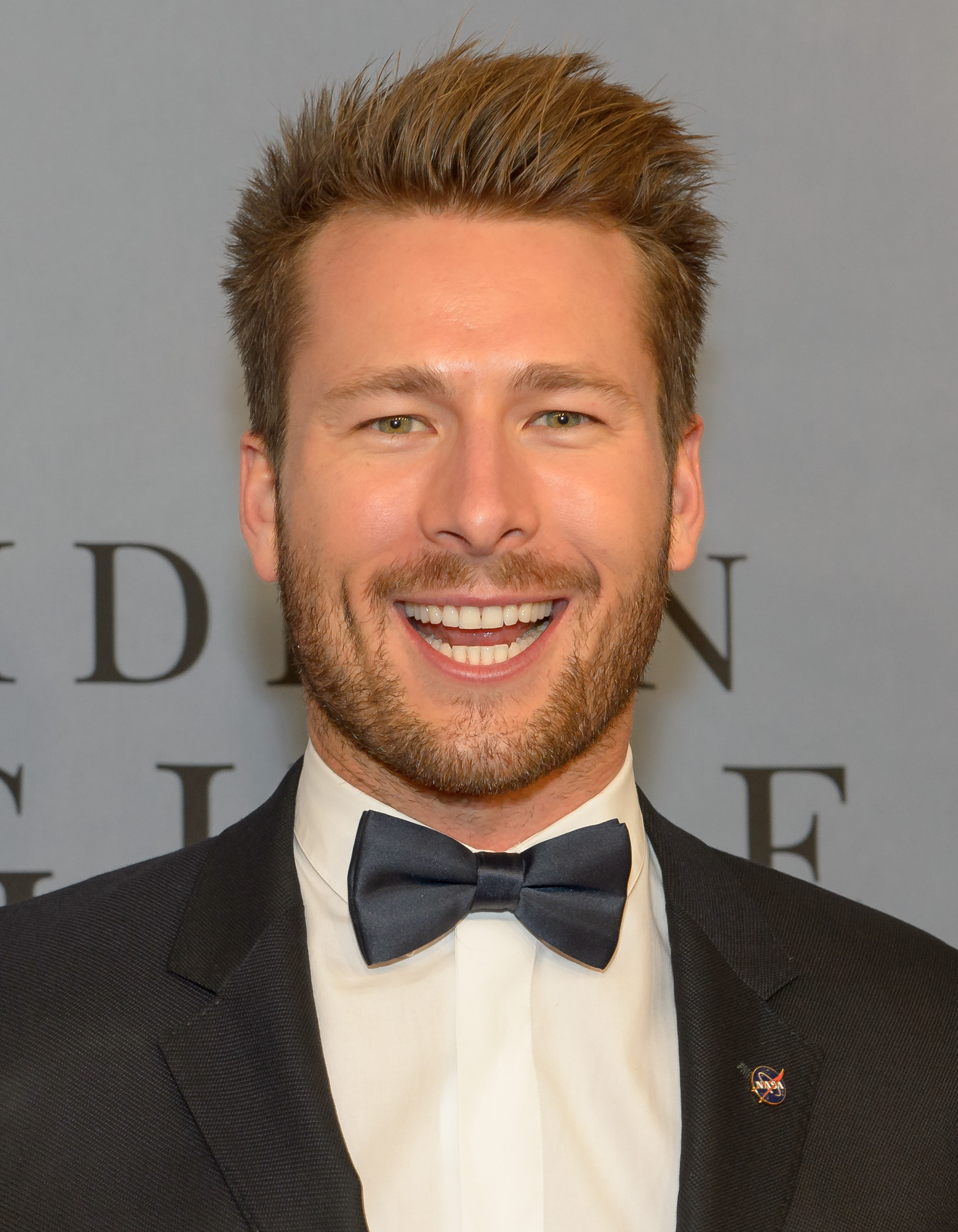
Glen Powell

- October 1
  - Cariba Heine, Australian actress and performer
  - Nemanja Matić, Serbian footballer
- October 3
  - Alex Dowsett, British racing cyclist
  - ASAP Rocky, American rapper and music video director
  - Alicia Vikander, Swedish actress
- October 4
  - Melissa Benoist, American actress and singer
  - Derrick Rose, American basketball player
- October 5
  - Maja Salvador, Filipino actress
  - Sam Warburton, Welsh rugby union player
- October 6 – Jennifer Maia, Brazilian mixed martial artist
- October 7 – Diego Costa, Brazilian born-Spanish footballer
- October 8 – Maddie Hinch, English field hockey player
- October 9 – Amanda Serrano, Puerto Rican boxer, mixed martial artist and professional wrestler
- October 10 – Jodie Devos, Belgian soprano (d. 2024)
- October 15 – Mesut Özil, German football player
- October 16 – Ikechukwu Ezenwa, Nigerian footballer
- October 18
  - Efe Ambrose, Nigerian footballer
  - Sam Quek, British field hockey player
- October 19
  - Irene Escolar, Spanish actress
  - Claudia Lösch, Austrian Paralympian and alpine monoskier
- October 20
  - Ma Long, Chinese table tennis player
  - Candice Swanepoel, South African supermodel
- October 21
  - Blanca Suárez, Spanish actress
  - Hope Hicks, American public relations consultant, White House Communications Director
  - Glen Powell, American actor
- October 22
  - Parineeti Chopra, Indian actress
  - Julia Krajewski, German equestrian
- October 23 – Nia Ali, American hurdler
- October 24 – Emilia Fahlin, Swedish cyclist
- October 28 – Camila Brait, Brazilian volleyball player
- October 29 – Dmitry Muserskiy, Russian volleyball player
- October 30 – Tandara Caixeta, Brazilian volleyball player
  - Janel Parrish, American actress
- October 31 – Sébastien Buemi, Swiss racing driver

=== November ===
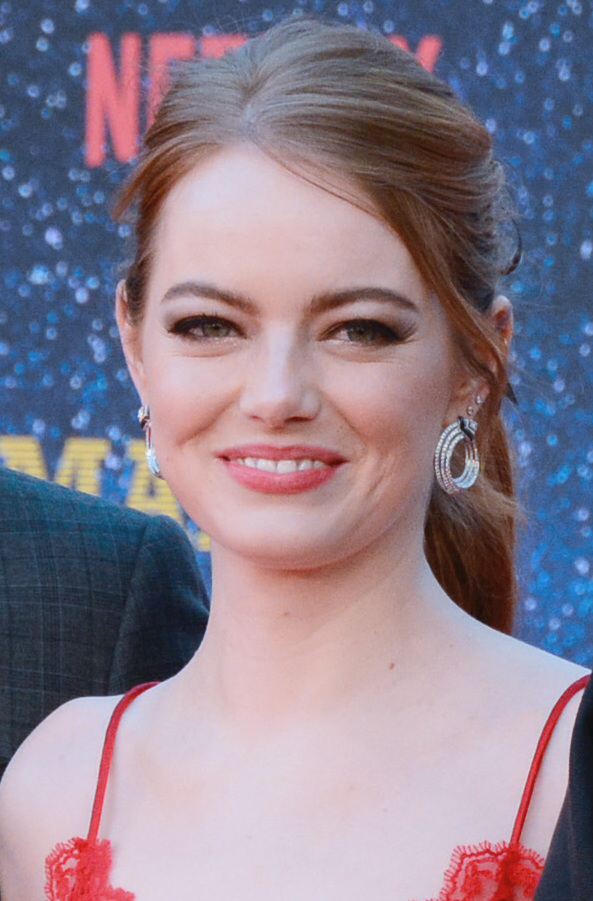
Emma Stone

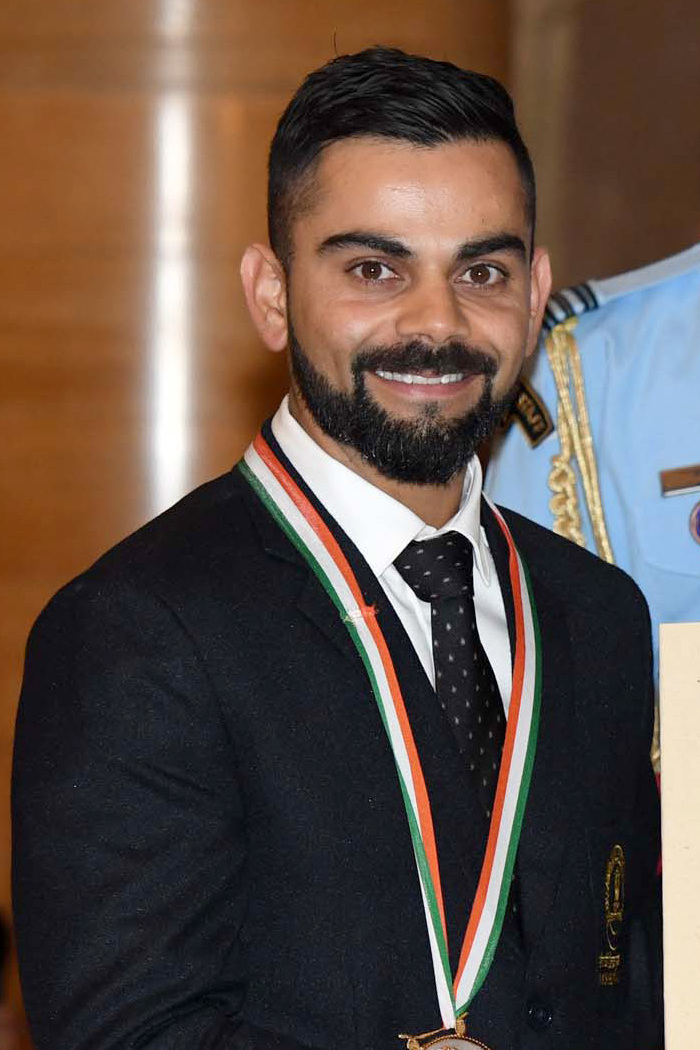
Virat Kohli

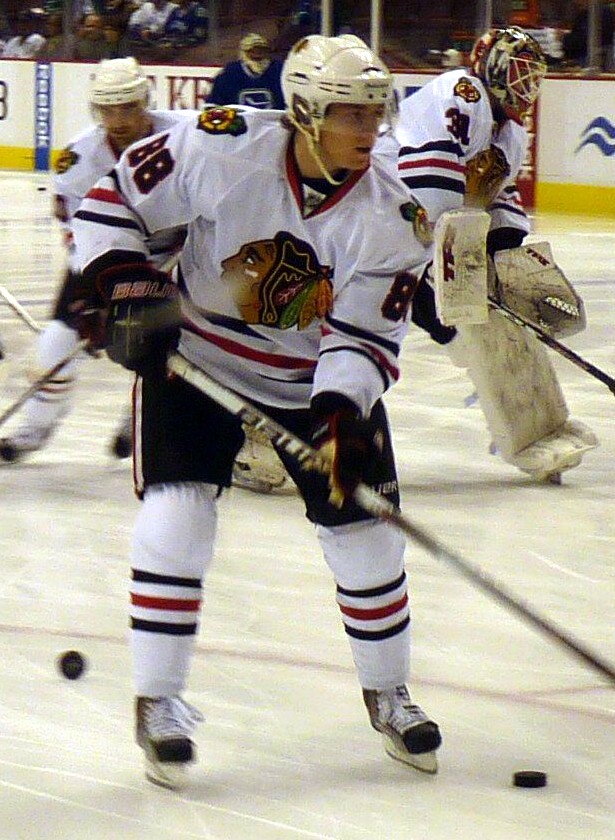
Patrick Kane

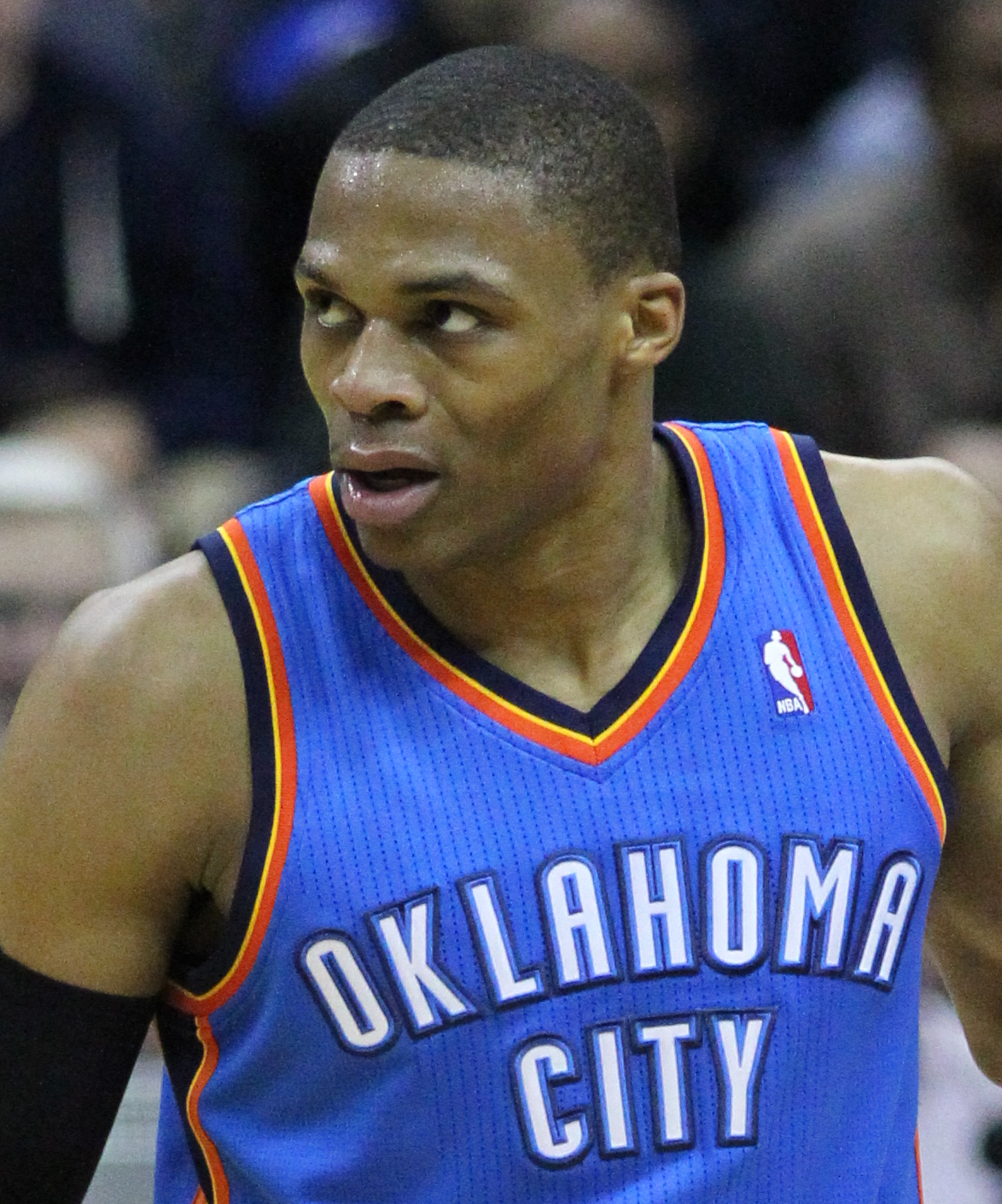
Russell Westbrook

- November 1
  - Scott Arfield, Scottish footballer
  - Masahiro Tanaka, Japanese baseball player
- November 2 – Julia Görges, German tennis player
- November 5 – Virat Kohli, Indian international cricketer
- November 6
  - Emma Stone, American actress
  - Conchita Wurst, Austrian singer, Eurovision Song Contest 2014 winner
- November 7
  - Alexandr Dolgopolov, Ukrainian tennis player
  - Tinie Tempah, English rapper
- November 8
  - Makwan Amirkhani, Iranian-Finnish mixed martial artist
  - Jessica Lowndes, Canadian actress and singer
- November 12 – Russell Westbrook, American basketball player
- November 9 – Lio Tipton, American actress and model
- November 15 – B.o.B., American rapper, singer, record producer and conspiracy theorist
- November 16 – Helly Luv, Iranian born-Finnish singer and actress
- November 19 – Patrick Kane, American ice hockey player
- November 20 – Dušan Tadić, Serbian footballer
- November 21 – Aaron Smith, New Zealand rugby union player
- November 22 – Dong Bin, Chinese triple jumper
  - Jamie Campbell Bower, English actor and singer
- November 25 – Nodar Kumaritashvili, Georgian luger (d.2010)
- November 26 – Hafþór Júlíus Björnsson, Icelandic strongman and actor
- November 29 – Russell Wilson, American football player
- November 30
  - Rebecca Rittenhouse American actress
  - Phillip Hughes, Australian cricketer (d. 2014)

=== December ===
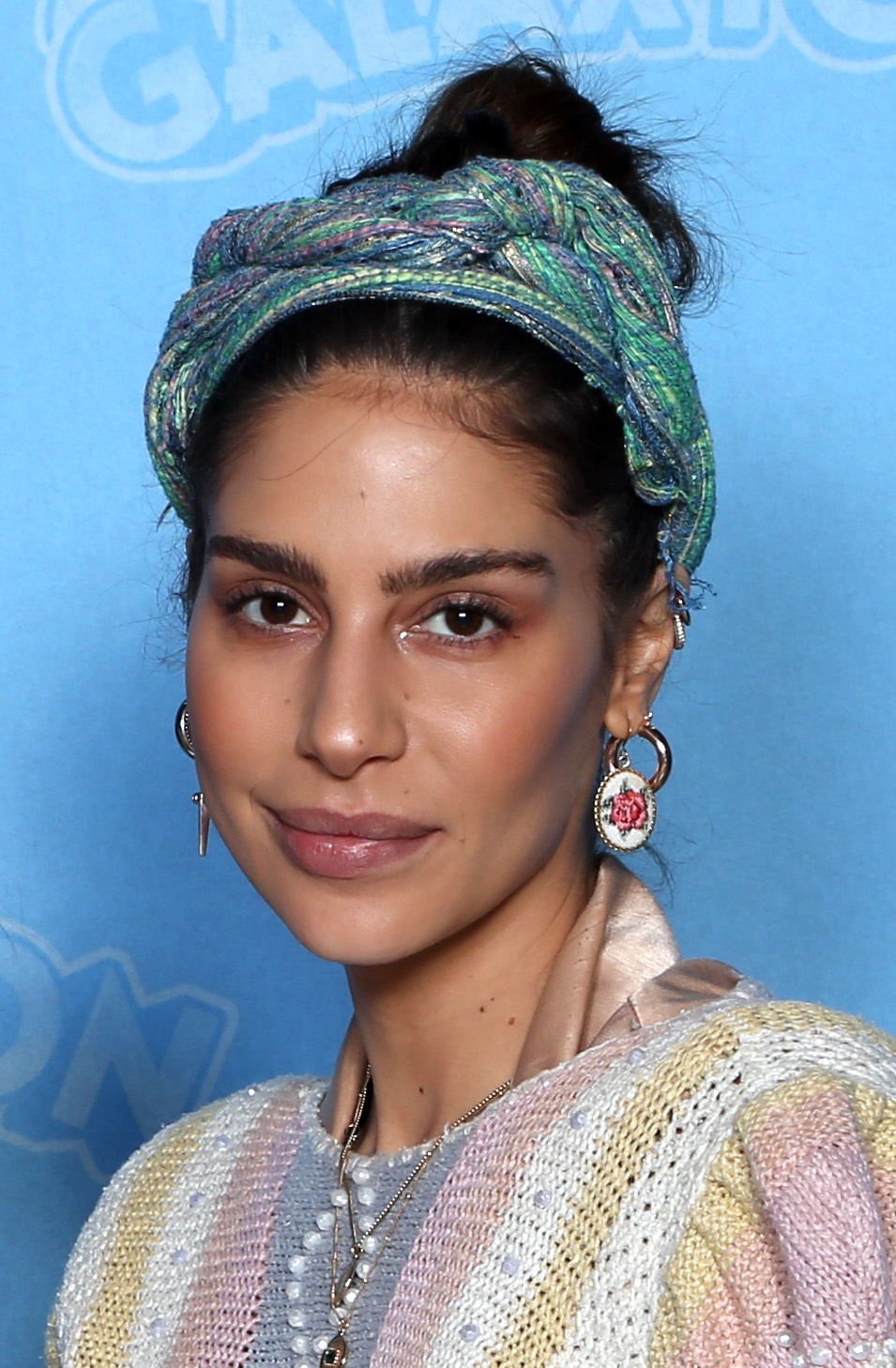
Nadia Hilker

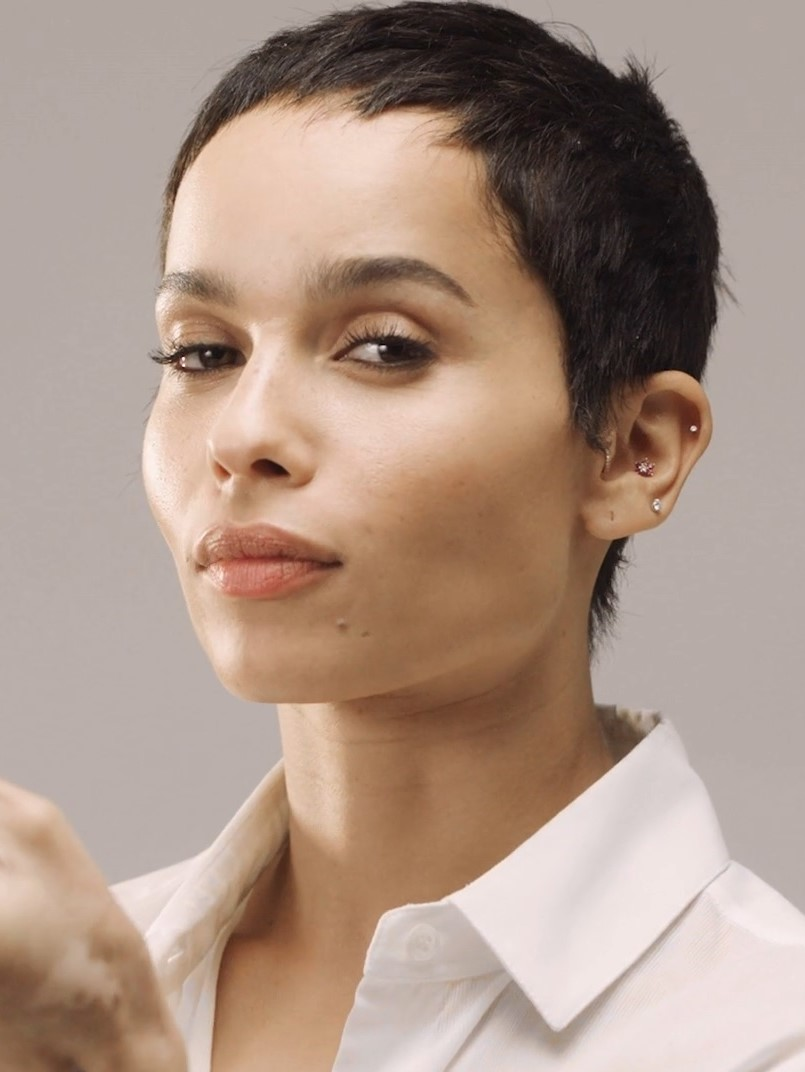
Zoë Kravitz

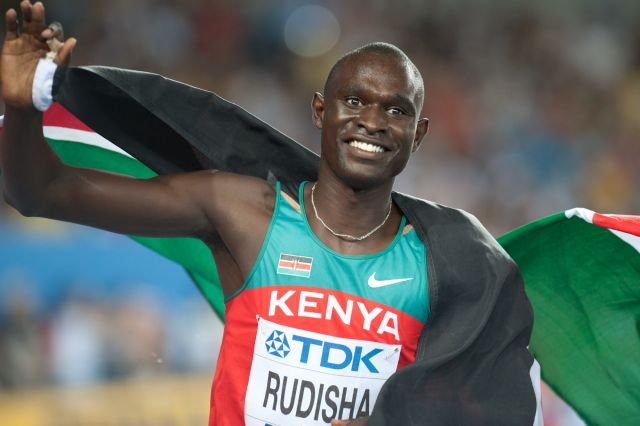
David Rudisha

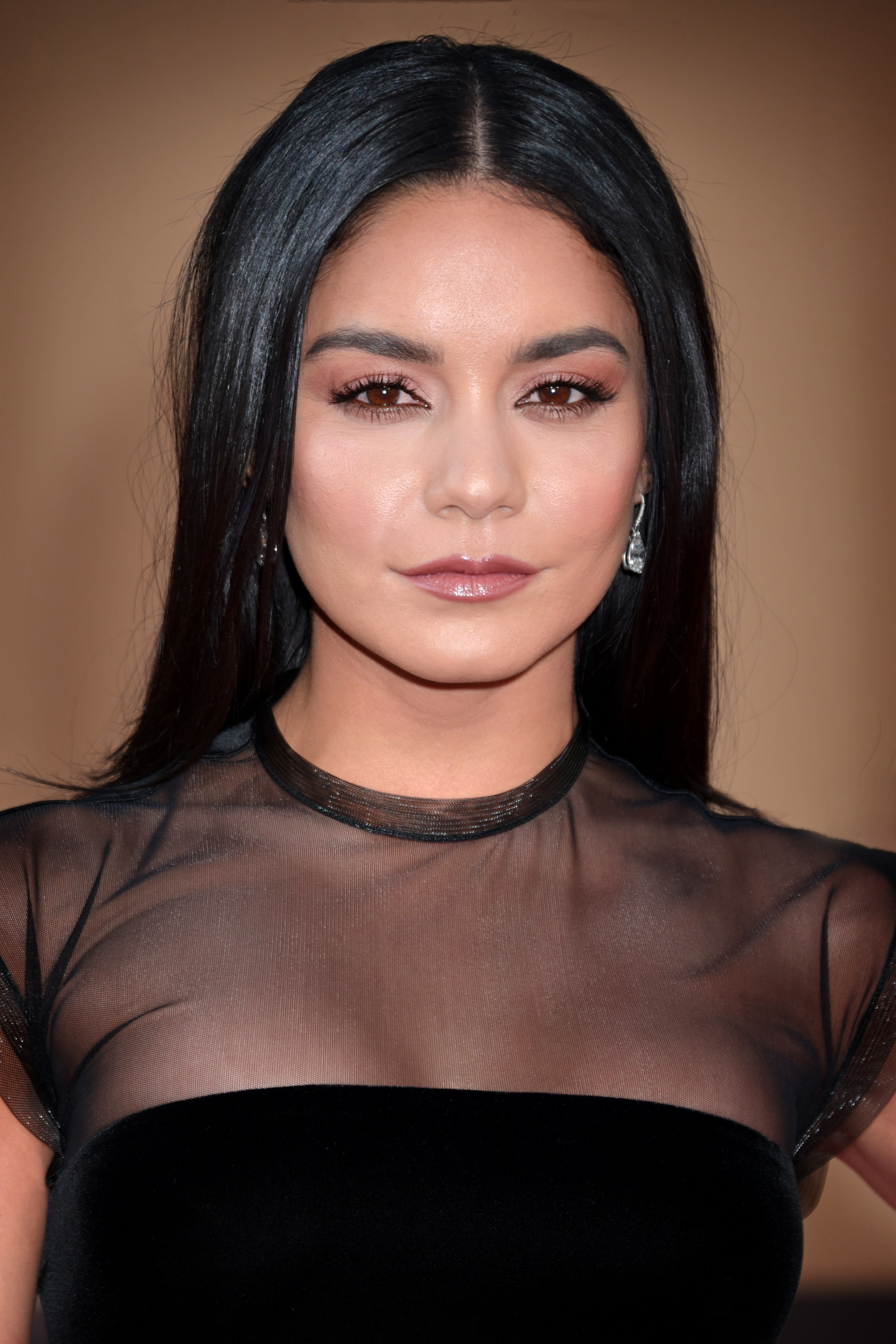
Vanessa Hudgens

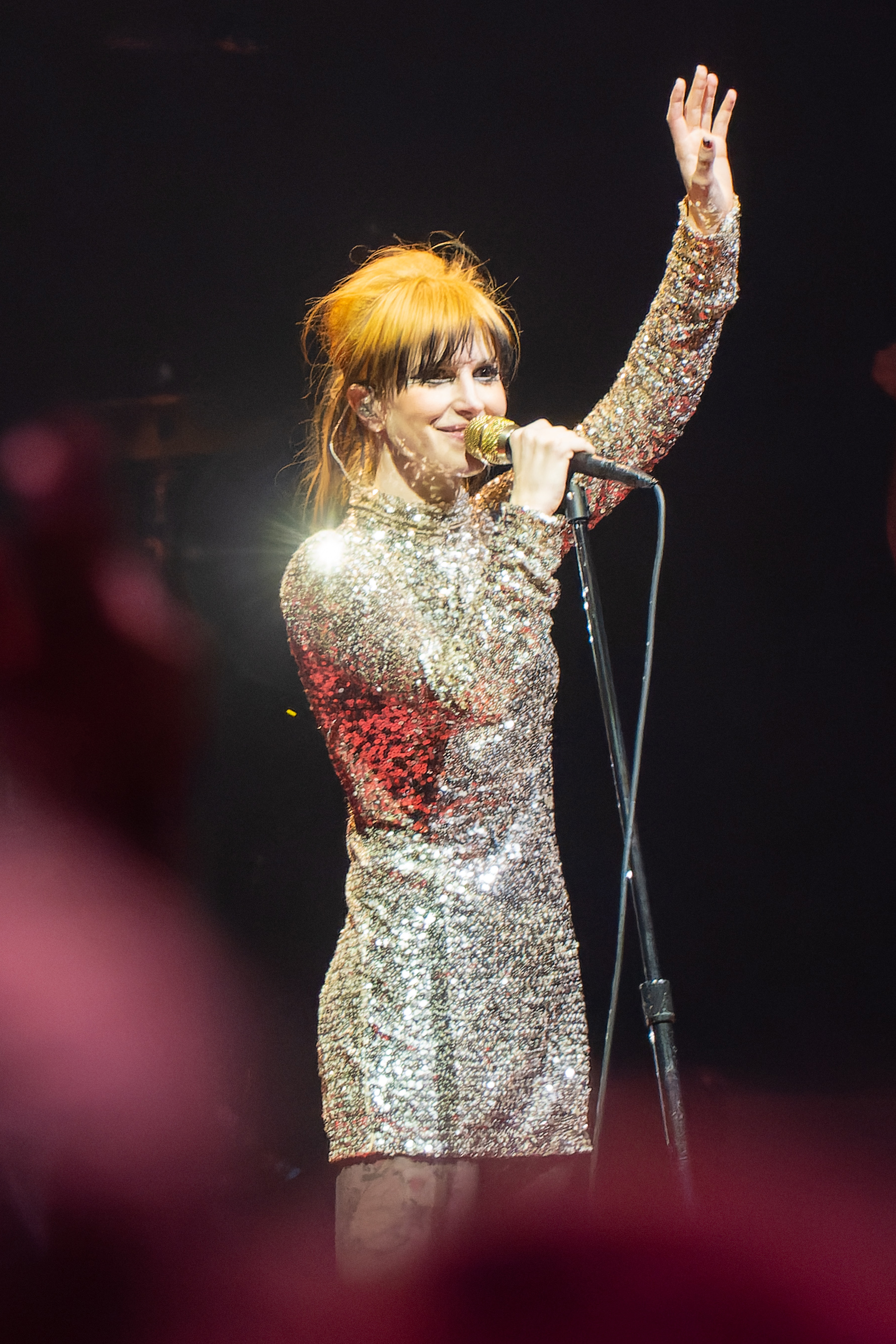
Hayley Williams

- December 1
  - Jelena Blagojević, Serbian volleyball player
  - Tyler Joseph, American singer
  - Zoë Kravitz, American actress, singer and model
- December 2 – Alfred Enoch, British actor
- December 4
  - Mario Maurer, Thai model and actor
  - Justin Meram, American-Iraqi soccer player
- December 5
  - Tina Charles, American basketball player
  - Joanna Rowsell, English cyclist
  - Miralem Sulejmani, Serbian footballer
- December 6 – Sandra Nurmsalu, Estonian musician
- December 7
  - Nathan Adrian, American Olympic swimmer
  - Emily Browning, Australian actress
  - Cláudia Gadelha, Brazilian mixed martial artist
- December 9 – Kwadwo Asamoah, Ghanaian footballer
- December 10
  - Wilfried Bony, Ivorian footballer
  - Jena Hansen, Danish sailor
  - Neven Subotić, Serbian footballer
- December 14
  - Nicolas Batum, French basketball player
  - Vanessa Hudgens, American actress and singer
- December 16
  - Mats Hummels, German footballer
  - Kaitlyn Lawes, Canadian curler
  - Chibuzor Okonkwo, Nigerian footballer
  - Park Seo-joon, South Korean actor and singer
- December 17
  - David Rudisha, Kenyan middle-distance runner
  - Yann Sommer, Swiss footballer
  - Rin Takanashi, Japanese film and television actress
- December 19 – Alexis Sánchez, Chilean footballer
- December 23 – Tatiana Kosheleva, Russian volleyball player
- December 24 – Nikola Mektić, Croatian tennis player
- December 25
  - Dele Adeleye, Nigerian footballer
  - Marco Mengoni, Italian singer-songwriter
- December 27 – Hayley Williams, American singer
- December 28 – Katlyn Chookagian, American mixed martial artist
- December 30
  - Leon Jackson, Scottish singer and X Factor winner
  - Ben-Ryan Davies, English actor

== Nobel Prizes ==

- Physics – Leon M. Lederman, Melvin Schwartz, Jack Steinberger
- Chemistry – Johann Deisenhofer, Robert Huber, Hartmut Michel
- Medicine – Sir James W. Black, Gertrude B. Elion, George H. Hitchings
- Literature – Naguib Mahfouz
- Peace – The United Nations Peace-Keeping Forces
- The Bank of Sweden Prize in Economic Sciences in Memory of Alfred Nobel – Maurice Allais
