= List of disasters in South Korea by death toll =

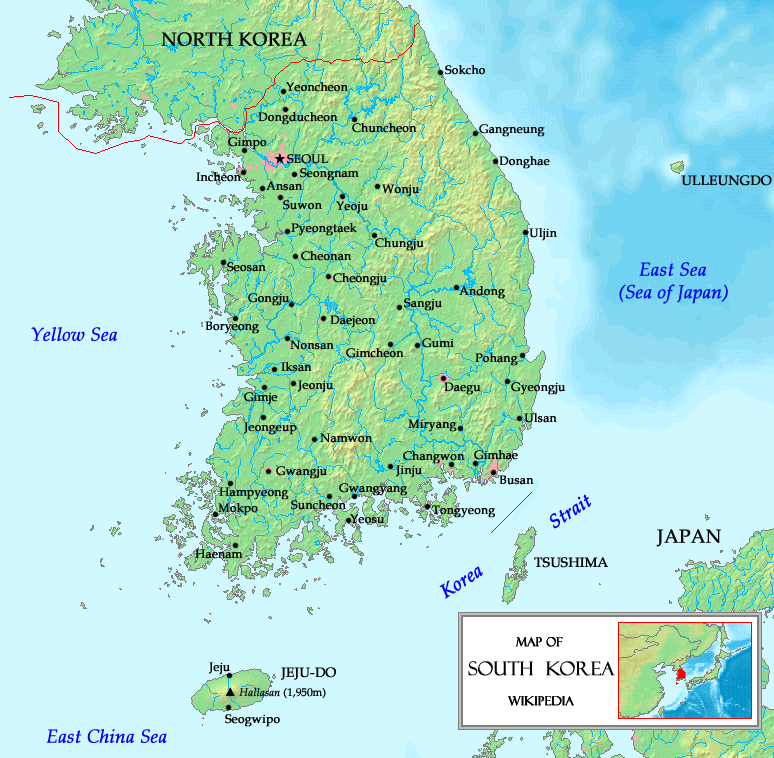
Map of South Korea

This list of South Korean disasters by death toll includes major disasters (excluding acts of war) that occurred on South Korean soil or involved South Korean citizens, in a definable incident, where the loss of life was 10 or more.

== 200 or more deaths ==
Fatalities	Year	Article	Type	Location	Comments
200,000+	1918-1920	Spanish flu	Pandemic	Nationwide	The Spanish flu occurred prior to the 1945 division of Korea and affected the entire peninsula, which means that this estimated death toll is for the entirety of Korea. No accurate estimate exists only for deaths that happened in what is now South Korea.
35,934	2020-present	COVID-19 pandemic in South Korea	Pandemic	Nationwide	
10,181	1945-1946	1945-46 Cholera outbreak	Disease outbreak	Nationwide	
1,232	1936	Typhoon 3693	Typhoon	Southwestern South Korea	
1,000-14,000	2011-2016	Humidifier disinfectant illness	Health disaster	Nationwide	
849	1959	Typhoon Sarah	Typhoon	Southeastern South Korea	
550	1972	Typhoon Betty	Typhoon	Most of South Korea	
502	1995	Sampoong Department Store collapse	Building collapse	Seoul	
323	1953	Sinking of the ''Changgyeongho''	Ship sinking	Offshore of Busan	
311	2014	Sinking of the MV Sewol	Ship sinking	Offshore of Geochagundo, South Jeolla	The sinking itself killed 304 passengers and crew, seven emergency/rescue personnel died following the initial sinking and are included in the final death toll.
292	1993	Sinking of the MV Seohae	Ship sinking	Offshore of Buan County, North Jeolla	
246	2002	Typhoon Rusa	Typhoon	Most of South Korea	
209 (South Koreans)	1997	Korean Air Flight 801	Plane crash	Nimitz Hill, Guam	

== 100 to 199 deaths ==
Fatalities	Year	Article	Type	Location	Comments
192	2003	Daegu subway fire	Arson	Daegu	
191	1971	Daeyeonggak Hotel fire	Building fire	Seoul	
179	2024	Jeju Air Flight 2216	Plane crash	Muan County, South Jeolla	
170	2009	2009 swine flu pandemic	Pandemic	Nationwide	
163	1990	1990 Han River flood	Flood	Han River basin	The 37 missing people are included in the death toll
159	2022	Seoul Halloween crowd crush	Crowd surge	Seoul	
159	1974	Sinking of the Tongyeong YTL	Ship sinking	Offshore of Tongyeong, South Gyeongsang	
140	1963	Sinking of the Yeonho	Ship sinking	Offshore of Mokpo, South Jeolla	
139	1981	Typhoon Agnes	Typhoon	Southern South Korea	
137	1969-1970	1969-70 Cholera outbreak	Disease outbreak	Nationwide	
136	1979	Typhoon Judy	Typhoon	Southern South Korea	
132	2003	Typhoon Maemi	Typhoon	Southeast South Korea	
129	2002	Air China Flight 129	Plane crash	Busan	
110	1963	Typhoon Shirley	Typhoon	Southern South Korea	
105 (South Koreans)	1983	Korean Air Lines Flight 007	Plane shootdown	Offshore of Sakhalin, USSR	
101	1995	1995 Daegu gas explosions	Gas explosion	Daegu	

== 99 to 10 deaths ==
Fatalities	Year	Incident Name	Type	Location	Comments
97	2002	Typhoon Rammasun	Typhoon	Central South Korea	
93	1967	Hanil-Chungnam collision	Ship collision	Offshore of Gadeokdo, Busan	
90+	1991	Tropical Storm Gladys (1991)	Tropical cyclone	Honam and Yeongnam	
89	2015	2015 MERS outbreak in South Korea	Outbreak	Nationwide	
88	1974	Daewang Corner fire	Building fire	Seoul	
80	1971	Cheongpyeong Dam Bus crash	Bus crash	Gapyeong	News Article link
77	2011	2011 Seoul floods	Flash floods	Seoul and Gangwon	The eight officially missing people are included in the death toll.
75 (South Koreans)	1989	Korean Air Flight 803	Plane crash	near Tripoli, Libya	
73	1945	1945 Daegu Station train collision	Train accident	Daegu	
73	1987	Typhoon Dinah	Typhoon	South and Eastern South Korea	Missing people are included in the death toll
68	1993	Asiana Airlines Flight 733	Plane crash	Haenam County, South Jeolla	
67	1959	1959 Busan crowd crush	Crowd surge	Busan	
63	1982	Typhoon Cecil	Typhoon	Most of South Korea	
59	1977	Iri Station explosion	Train accident	Iksan, North Jeolla	
57	2020	2020 Korea floods	Floods	Nationwide	The 12 officially missing people are included in the death toll
56	1999	1999 Inhyeon-dong fire	Building fire	Seoul	
56	1954	Osan crossing military truck accident	Train collision	Osan, Gyeonggi	
55	1981	1981 Gyeongsan train collision	Train collision	Daegu	
53	1982	1982 Korean Air Force C-123 crash	Plane crash	Hallasan, Jeju	
52	1960	Busan International Rubber Factory fire	Building fire	Busan	
50-60	1996	1996 Korea floods	Floods	Central and northern South Korean	
50	2023	2023 South Korea floods	Floods	North Chungcheong and North Gyeongsang	Officially missing people are included in the death toll
50	1996	Typhoon Yeni	Typhoon	Southern South Korea	
46	1970	Gyeongso Middle School math trip disaster	Train collision	South Chungcheong	
46	2010	ROKS Cheonan sinking	Ship sinking	Offshore of Baengnyeongdo, Incheon	
44	1979	Eunseong Coal Mine fire	Mine accident	Mungyeong, North Gyeongsang	
42	1955	Busan Station train fire	Train fire	Busan	
41	2018	Miryang hospital fire	Building fire	Miryang, South Gyeongsang	
41	1969	1969 Cheonan train collision	Train collision	Cheonan, South Chungcheong	
40	2008	2008 Icheon fire	Building fire	Icheon, Gyeonggi	
39	2020	2020 Icheon fire	Building fire	Icheon, Gyeonggi	
38	1984	Dae-A Hotel fire	Building fire	Busan	
37	1995	Gyeonggi Women's Technical College fire	Arson	Yongin, Gyeonggi	
36	1987	Geukdongho fire accident	Ship fire	Geoje, South Gyeongsang	
34	1970	Wau Apartment collapse	Building collapse	Seoul	
34	1993	Nonsan Mental Hospital fire	Building fire	Nonsan, South Chungcheong	
33	1978	Typhoon Carmen	Typhoon	Nationwide	
32	1994	Seongsu Bridge disaster	Bridge collapse	Seoul	
32	1973	Yeongdong Station disaster	Train accident	Seoul	
31	1960	Seoul Station stampede	Crowd surge	Seoul	
30	1970	Typhoon Billie	Typhoon	Western South Korea	
30	2025	March 2025 South Korea wildfires	Wildfire	South and central South Korea	
30	1994	Chungjuho cruise ship fire	Ship fire	Chungju Lake, North Chungcheong	
29	2017	Jecheon building fire	Building fire	Jecheon, North Chungcheong	
28	1974	Typhoon Gilda	Typhoon	Southeast South Korea	
27	1998	1998 Busan Beomchang Cold Plaza fire	Building fire	Busan	
27	1971	Typhoon Olive	Typhoon	Southeastern South Korea	
26	1979	Hambak Coal Mine explosion	Mine accident	Jeongseon County, Gangwon	
26 (South Koreans)	2019	Hableány disaster	Ship sinking	Budapest, Hungary	
25	1990	Seomgang Bridge bus crash	Bus crash	Seoul	
25	1970	Chupungnyeong Express bus disaster	Bus crash	Gimcheon, North Gyeongsang	
23	2024	Hwaseong battery factory fire	Building fire	Hwaseong, Gyeonggi	
23	1999	Sealand Youth Training Center Fire	Building fire	Hwaseong, Gyeonggi	
21	2014	Jangseong Nursing Home Fire	Building fire	Jangseong County, Honam	
21	1990	Soyangho bus crash	Bus crash	Inje County, Gangwon	
21	1968	Sinking of the Seojoho	Ship sinking	Seocheon County, Hoseo	
20	2022	2022 South Korea floods	Floods	Central South Korea	Officially missing people are included in the death toll
20	1971	Namwon Station train collision accident	Train accident	Namwon, North Jeolla	
20	2001	Jinju tour bus crash	Bus crash	Jinju, South Gyeongsang	
20	1993	Yeoncheon Reserve Forces Training Ground explosion	Explosion	Yeoncheon County, Seoul	
19	1988	Cheonho Bridge bus crash	Bus crash	Seoul	
19	1974	New Namsan Tourist Hotel fire	Building fire	Seoul	
19	1976	Banghak-dong Galwol level crossing accident	Train accident	Seoul	
18	2015	Sinking of Dolgorae	Ship sinking	Offshore of the Chuja Islands	
18	1977	Jitan Station train collision	Train collision	Okcheon County, Hoseo	
17	2008	Sinking of the Macau Zeus	Ship sinking	Offshore of Macau	
17	1973	Gwangjin Bridge bus crash	Bus crash	Seoul	
17 (South Koreans)	2004	2004 Boxing Day tsunami	Tsunami	Southeast Asia	
16	2007	Sinking of the Golden Rose	Ship collision	Offshore of Dangjin, South Chungcheong	
16	2014	Pangyo Techno Valley vent collapse	Festival accident	Seongnam, Gyeonggi	
16	1968	Sinking of the Cheonjiho	Ship sinking	Mokpo, South Jeolla	
16	1980	Korean Air Lines Flight 015	Plane crash	Seoul	
15	2017	Seonchang 1 collision with the Myeongjin 15	Ship collision	Ongjin County, Incheon	
15	1992	Wonju Kingdom Hall fire	Arson	Wonju, Gangwon	
15	2009	2009 Busan indoor shooting range fire	Building fire	Busan	
14	2024	Jeju Biyangdo fishing boat sinking	Ship sinking	Biyangdo, Jeju	Officially missing people are included in the death toll
14	1970	Wonju Samkwang Tunnel train collision	Train collision	Wonju, Gangwon	
14	1989	Ulleungdo tourist helicopter crash	Helicopter crash	near Ulleungdo, North Gyeongsang	
13	2007	Typhoon Nari	Typhoon	Jeju	
13	2011	2011 Chuncheon landslide	Landslide	Chuncheon, Gangwon	
12	2019	Daeseongho fire	Ship fire	Offshore of Jeju	
12	2010	2010 Incheon Bridge bus crash	Bus crash	Incheon	
12	1977	Jangseong coal mine fire	Mine disaster	Jangseong County, Honam	
12	1994	1994 Ahyeon-dong gas explosion	Gas explosion	Seoul	
12	2011	Typhoon Meari	Typhoon	West coast of South Korea	
12	2003	2003 Cheongdo Daheung Nongsan fire	Building fire	Cheongdo County, North Gyeongsang	
11	2005	Sangju concert crowd crush	Crowd surge	Sangju, North Gyeongsang	
11	1982	Seoul Subway Line 3 Collapse	Cave-in	Seoul	
10	2014	2014 South Korea floods	Floods	Honam and Yeongnam	
10	1980	Typhoon Norris	Typhoon	Nationwide	
10	1982	Daegu Kumho Tourist Hotel fire	Building fire	Daegu	
10	2014	2014 Gyeongju Mauna Ocean Resort gymnasium collapse	Building collapse	Gyeongju, North Gyeongsang	
10	2016	Gyeongbu Expressway Tour Bus Fire	Bus fire	Ulsan	
10 (South Koreans)	2015	2015 Jian bus crash	Bus crash	Tonghua, Jilin Province, China	
10	1978	Pupa mass food poisoning incident	Health disaster	Seoul	
10	2010	Pohang Nursing Home Fire	Building fire	Pohang, North Gyeongsang	
10	2007	Yeosu Foreigner Shelter Fire	Building fire	Yeosu, South Jeolla	
10	2001	Yeji Academy fire	Building fire	Gwangju, Gyeonggi	

== Gallery ==
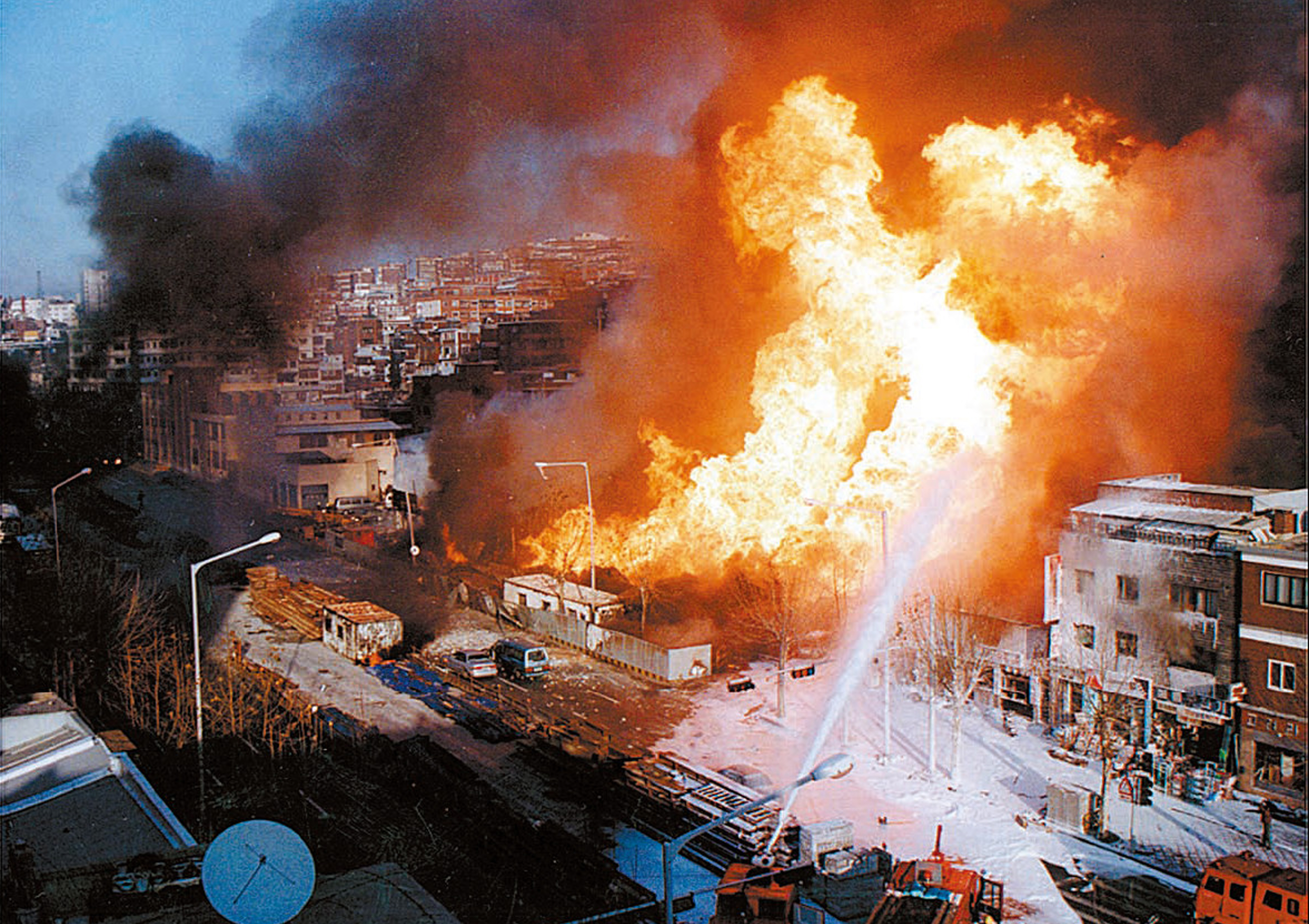
1994 Ahyeon-dong gas explosion

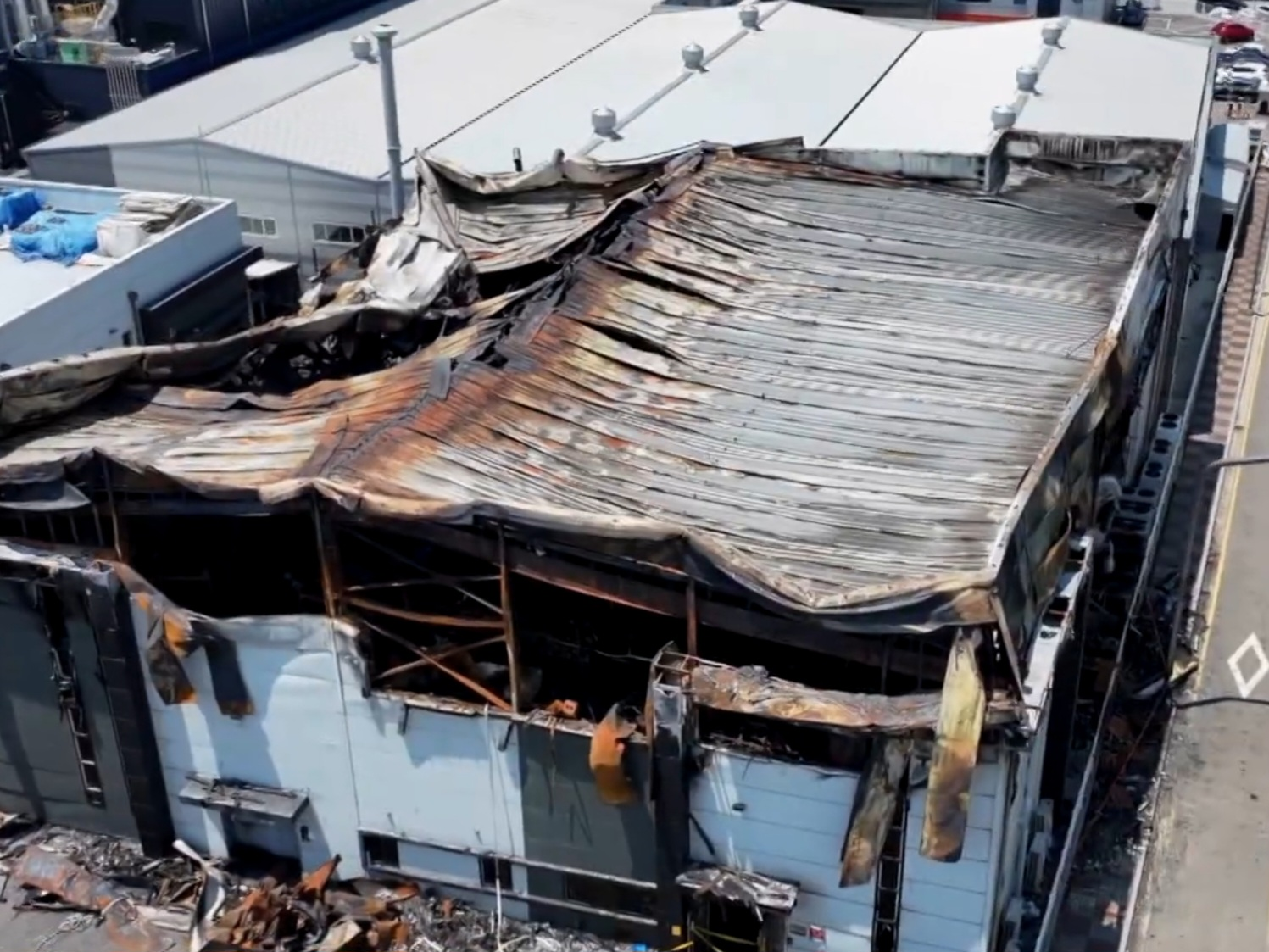
Hwaseong battery factory fire

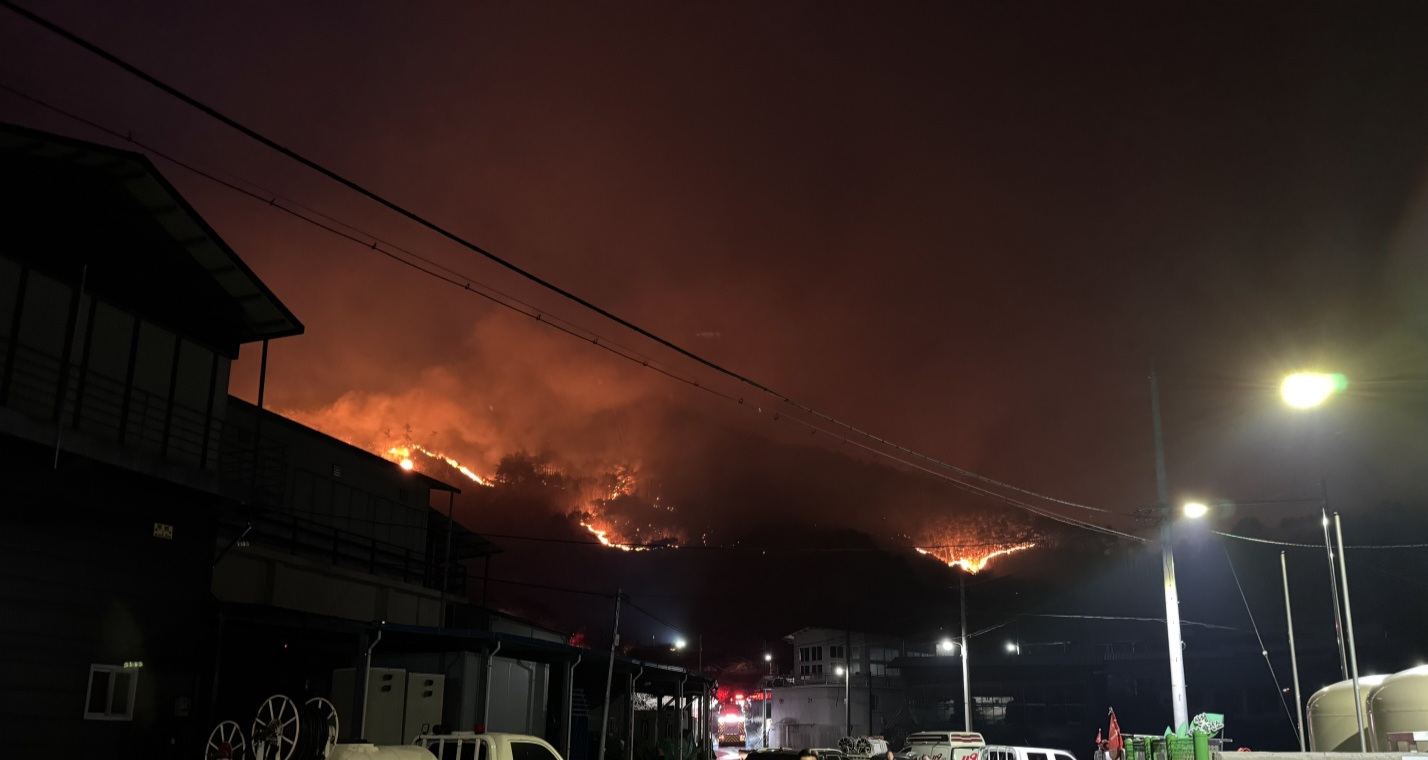
2025 South Korea wildfires

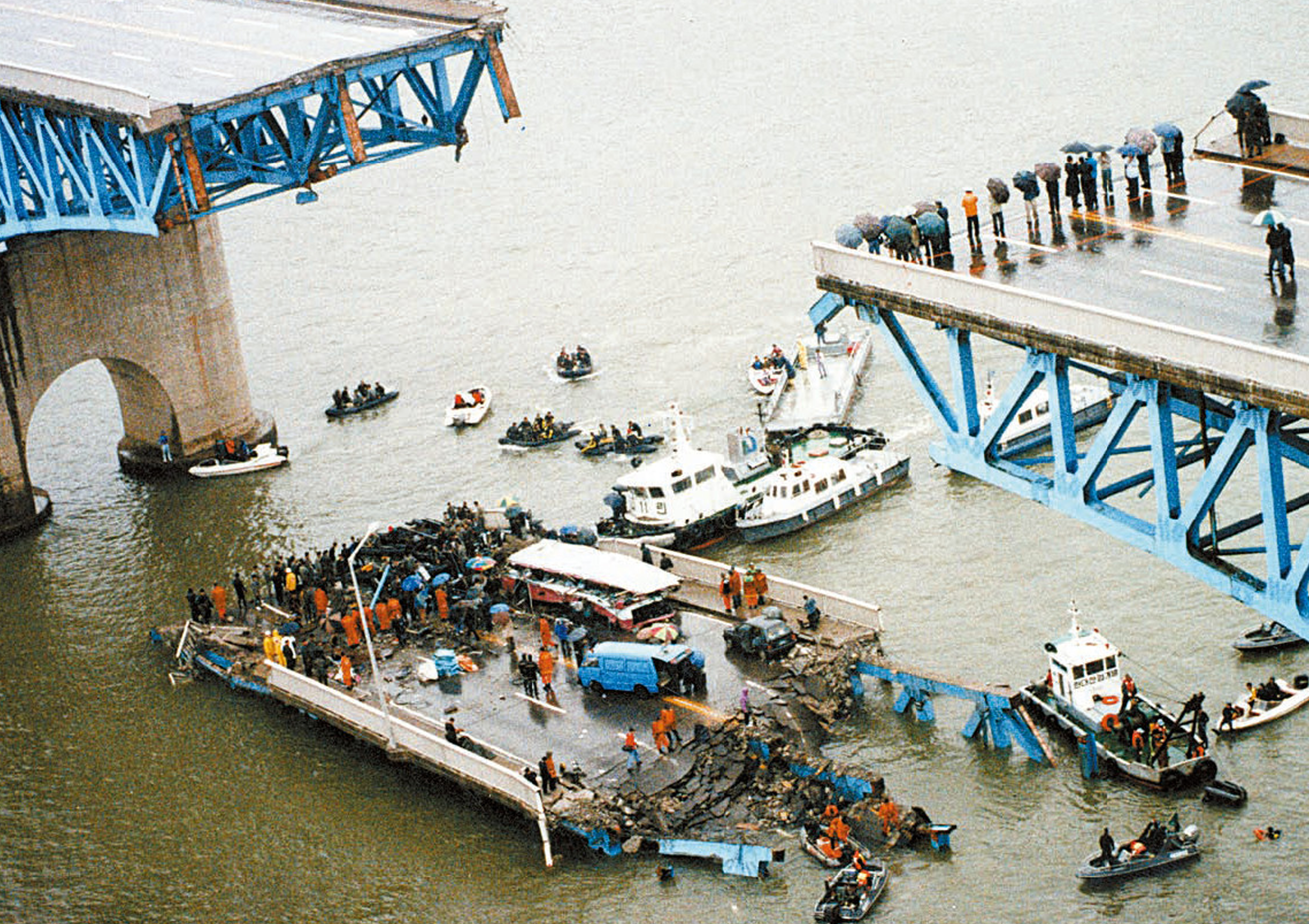
Seongsu Bridge disaster

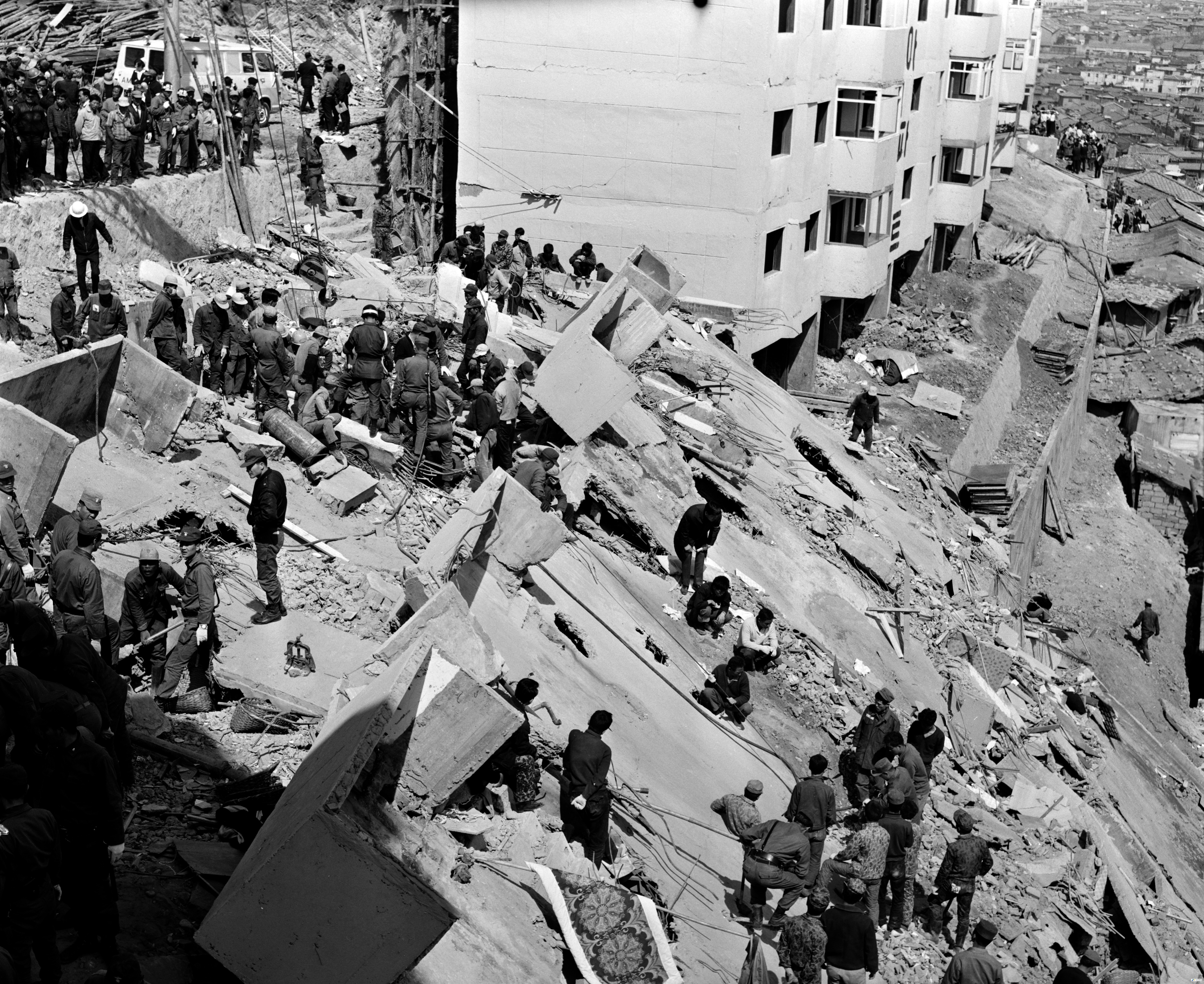
Wawoo Apartment collapse

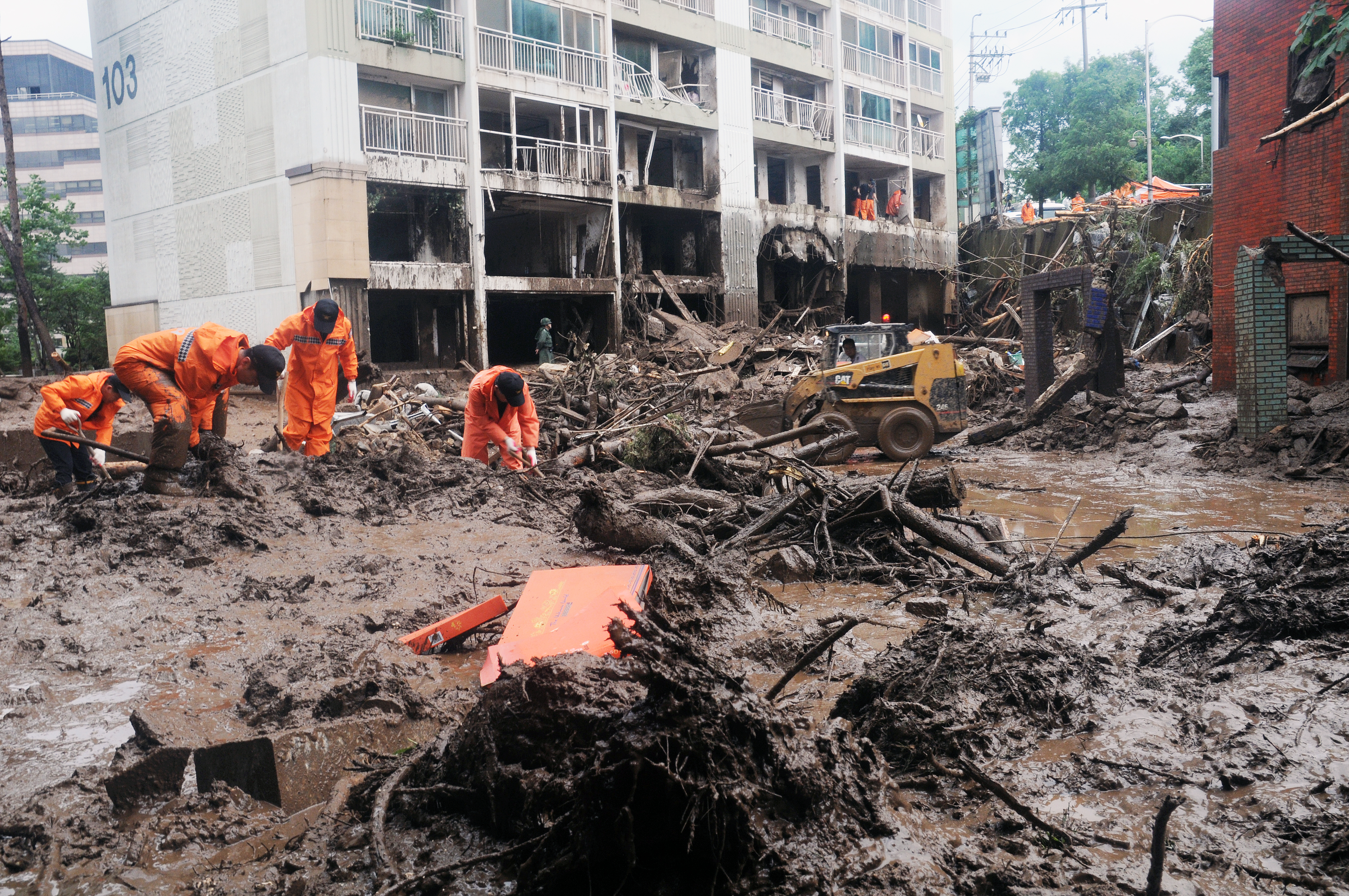
2011 Seoul floods

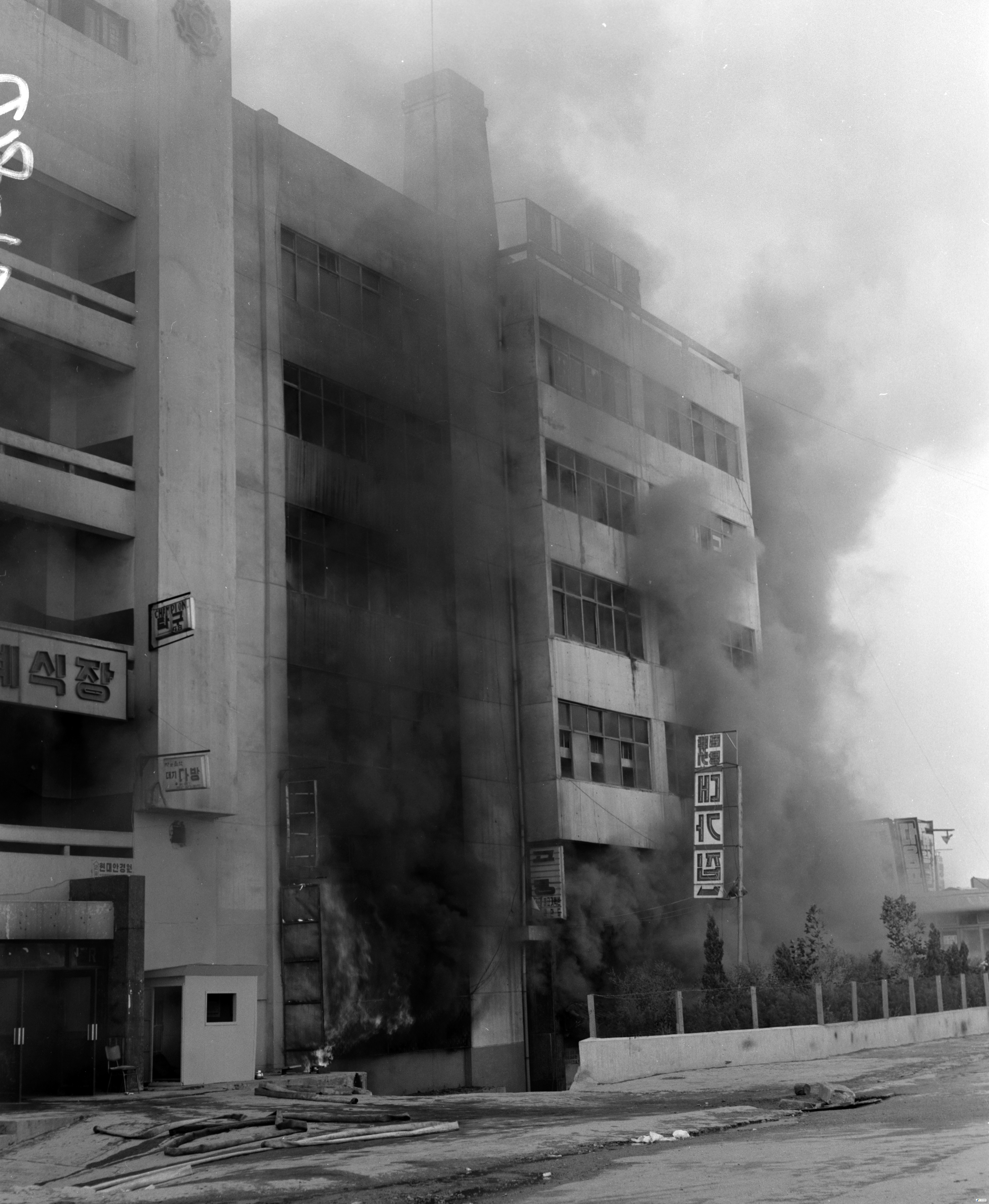
1974 Daewang Corner fire

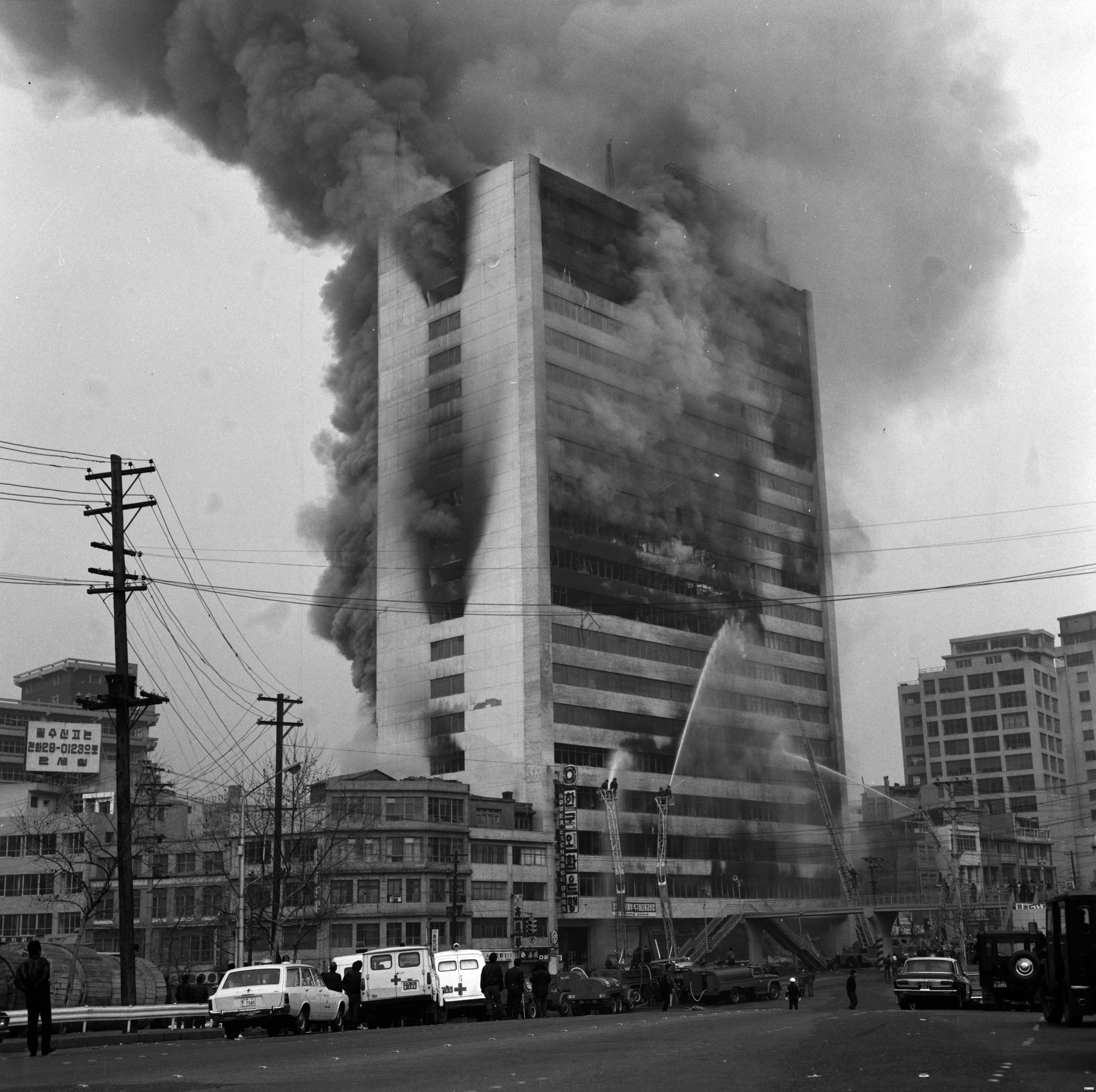
Daeyeonggak Hotel fire

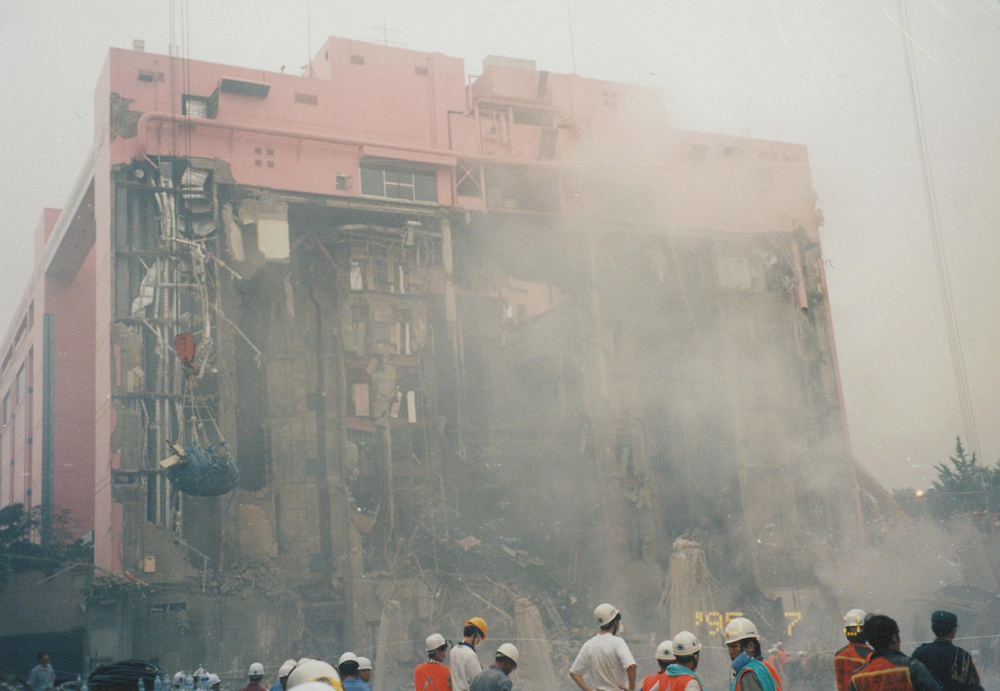
Sampoong Department Store collapse

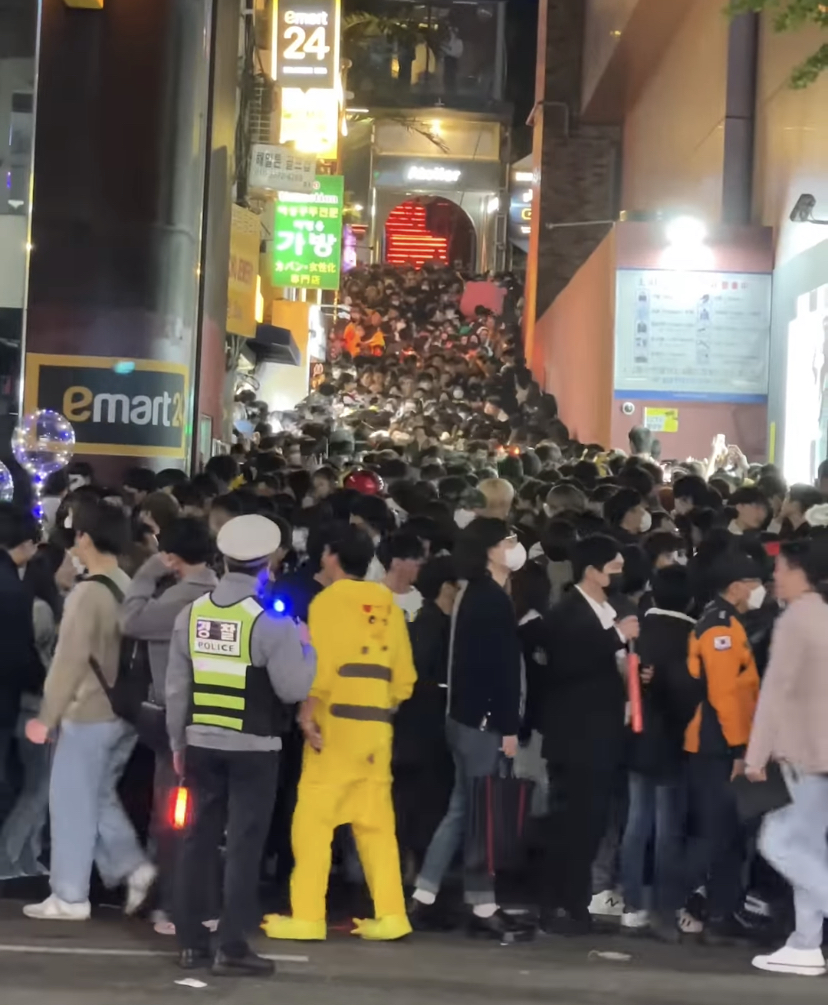
Seoul Halloween crowd crush

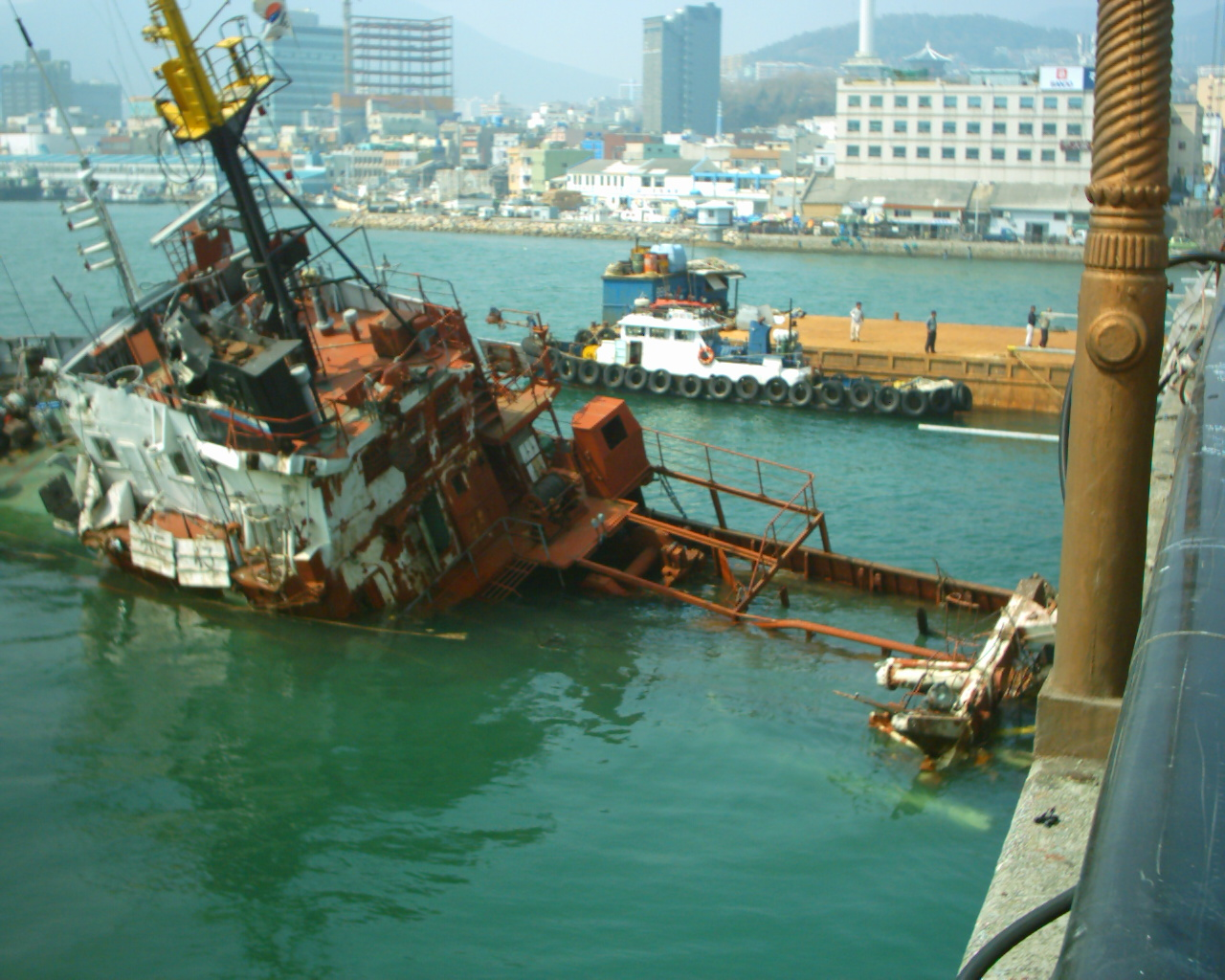
Typhoon Maemi

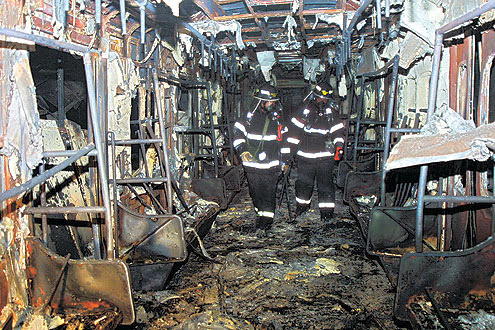
Daegu subway fire

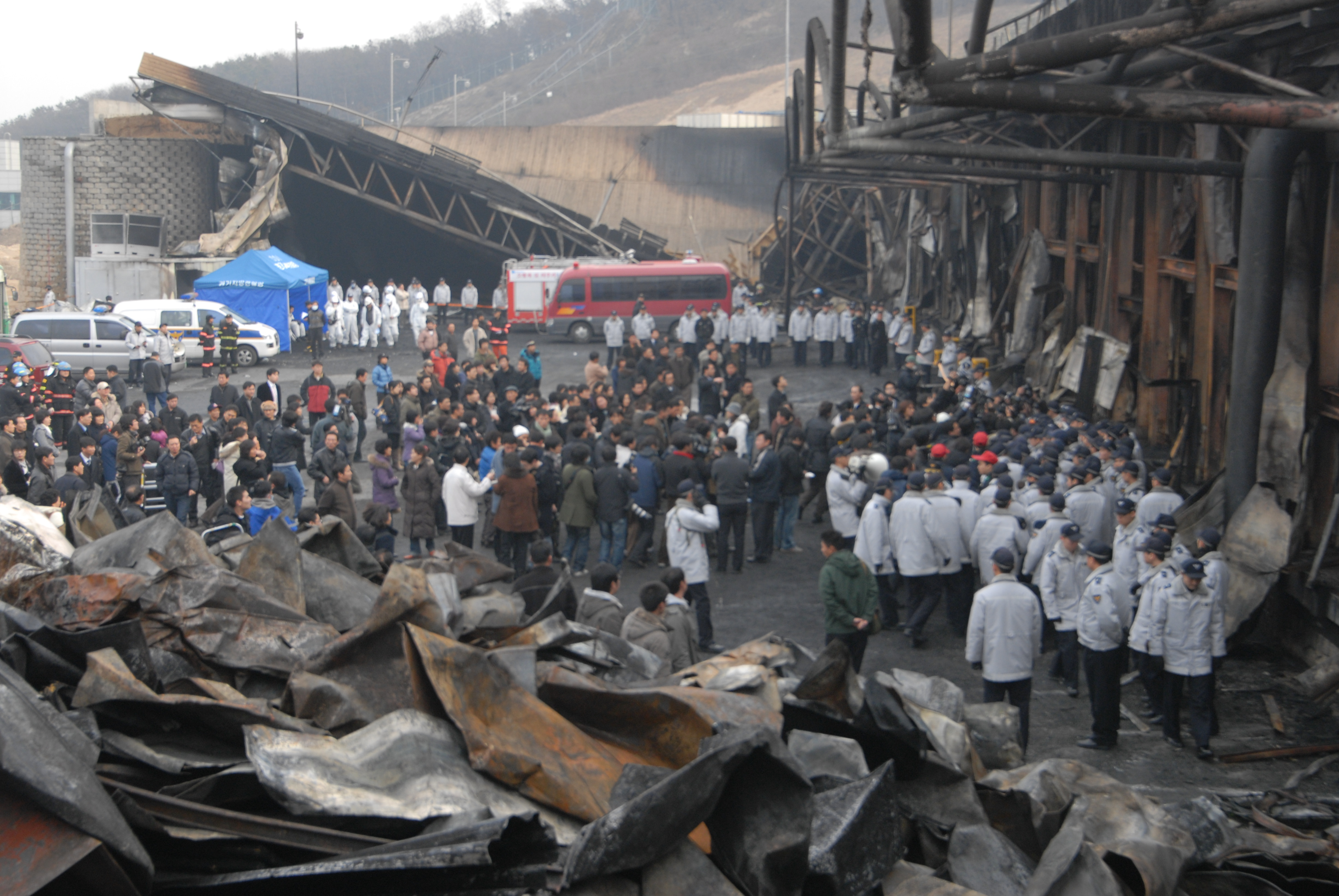
2008 Icheon fire

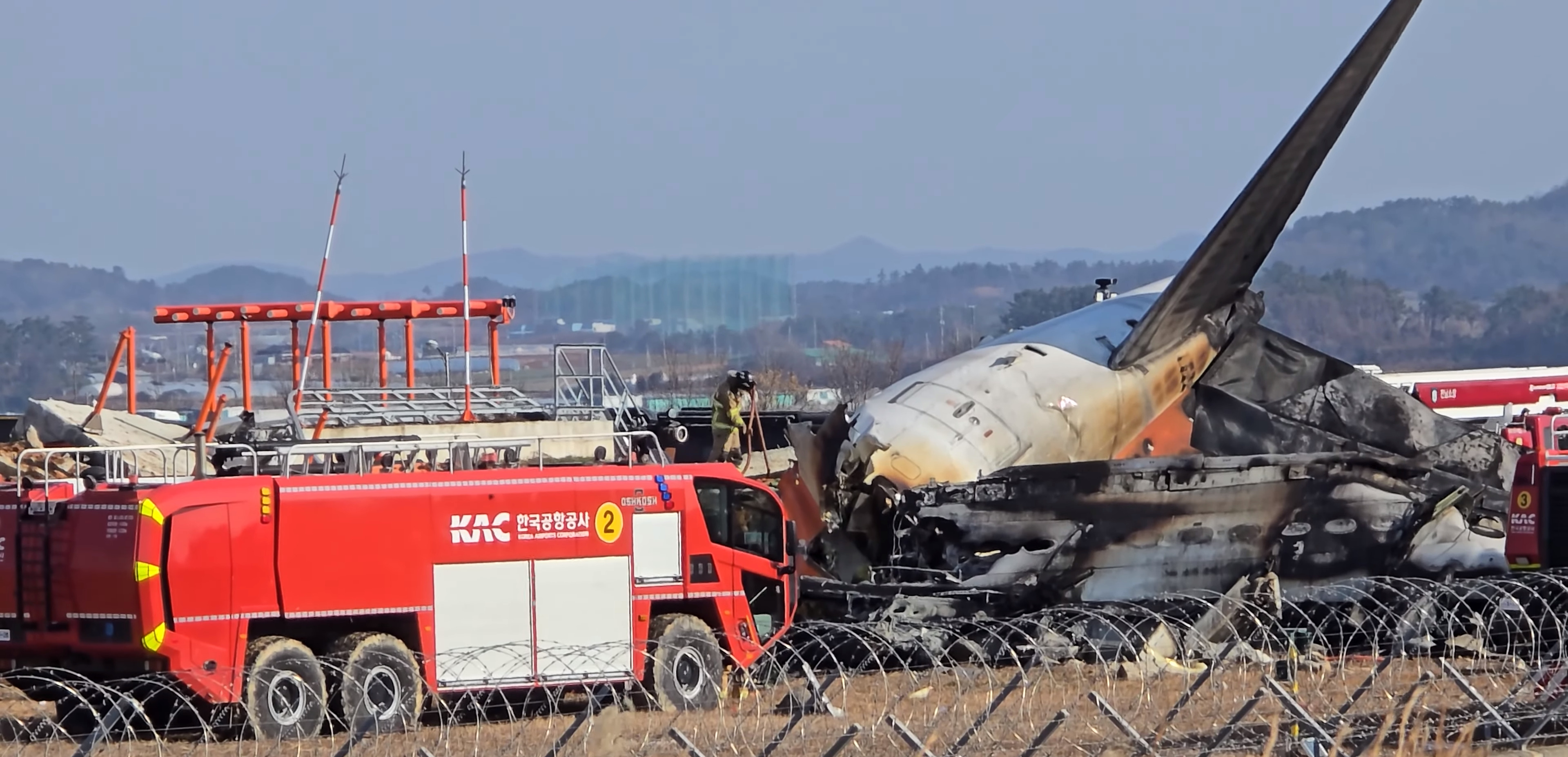
Jeju Air Flight 2216

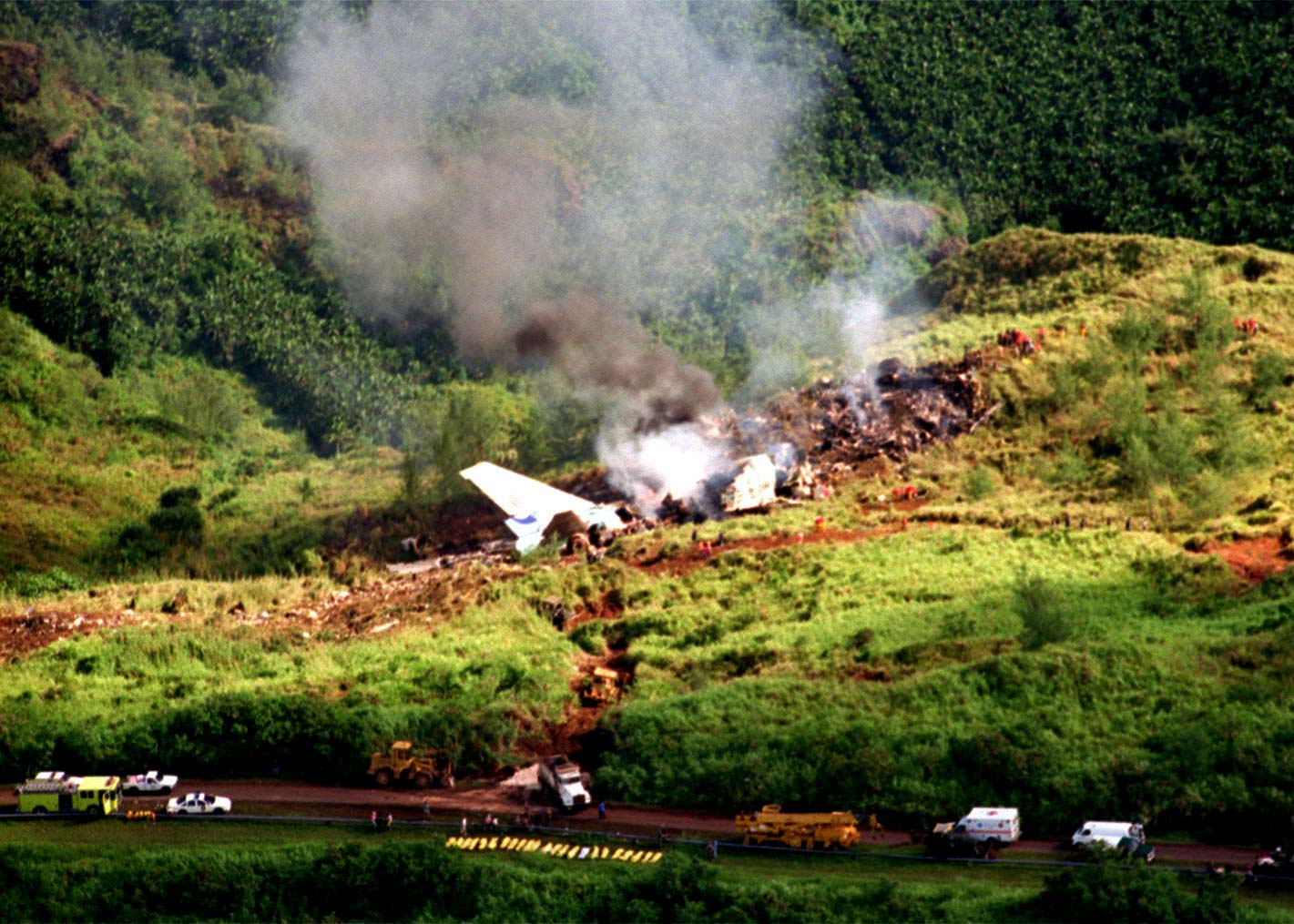
Korean Airlines Flight 801

== See also ==
- List of man-made disasters in South Korea
