= List of man-made disasters in South Korea =

This is a partial list of man-made disasters in South Korea since the Korean War. It includes events that have a Wikipedia entry and other events mentioned in a reputable source.

Year	Date	Location	Number killed	Type	Description	Reference
1953	5 January	en route from Yosu to Pusan	229	Maritime accident	Sinking of ferry MV Changgyeong	
1960	26 January	Seoul Railroad Station	31	Stampede	At least 3,926 people rush to platform on Number 601 local train, according to the South Korean National Police Agency's official confirmed report.	
1969	11 December	Departed from Kangnung Air Base	0	Terrorism	Hijacking of South Korean domestic flight	Korean Air Lines YS-11 hijacking
1970	14 October	Mosan accident	46	Level crossing accident	A bus carrying 77 middle school students collided with a Changhang Station-bound express train at Mosan, South Chungcheong Province, to according to the South Korean KNPA official confirmed report.	
1971	28 December	Seoul	164	Fire	Deadliest hotel fire in South Korean history	Daeyeonggak Hotel fire
1972	15 December	en route from Seogwipo to Pusan	323 to 326	Maritime accident	Sinking of ferry Namyoung-Ho	Sinking of Namyoung-Ho
1974	3 November	Seoul	64	Nightclub fire	Time Club fire	List of nightclub fires
1977	11 November	Iksan, North Cholla	56 to 59	Explosion	Accidental detonation of a munitions train	Iri Station explosion
1980	15 November	Kimpo International Airport	15	Aviation disaster	Pilot error on landing due to bad weather	Korean Air Lines Flight 015
1980	18–27 May	Kwangju	187	Riots	Demonstrations opposing the Coup d'état of May Seventeenth	Gwangju Uprising
1982	6 February	Cheju International Airport	53	Aviation accident	Crashing of military plane from bad weather	February 1982 Korean Air Force C-123 accident
1982	18 March	Busan	1	Arson	Arson attack on U.S. target	Pusan American Cultural Service building arson
1982	18 April	Uiryong County	25	Fire	Accidental fire in a club, fire escapes chained shut	List of nightclub fires
1984	14 January	Busan	34	Fire	Hotel fire	
1986	5 April	Osan Air Base	16	Fire	Fire at a military fuel depot	
1986	14 September	Kimpo International Airport	5	Terrorism	Bombing of airport by North Korea	Gimpo International Airport bombing
1987	17 June	near Koje Island	25 – 38	Fire	Fire from an overheated engine and sinking	Kukdong-ho Fire
1987	29 November	Over the Andaman Sea	115	Terrorism	Airliner destroyed by bomb planted aboard	Korean Air Flight 858
1988	25 March	Anyang, Kyonggi	22	Fire	Fire inside of Green Hill Textile Company	
1991	17 October	Taegu	16	Arson	Attack on a nightclub	
1993	28 March	Kupo station	78	Train derailment	Unauthorized tunneling under causing track to collapse	
1993	26 July	Mokpo Airport	69	Aviation accident	Pilot error leading to controlled flight into terrain	Asiana Airlines Flight 733
1993	10 October	offshore near Puan County	292	Maritime accident	Sinking of ferry in bad weather	Sinking of MV Seohae
1994	21 October	Seoul	32	Structural failure	Collapse of section of bridge from faulty weld	Seongsu Bridge Disaster
1995	28 April	Taegu	101	Explosion	Construction accident leading to puncturing of gas pipe	1995 Daegu gas explosions
1995	29 June	Seoul	502	Structural failure	Department store collapse from structural overload	Sampoong Department Store collapse
1996	17 September – 5 November	Kangnung	40	Military confrontation	Infiltration of North Korean spy submarine resulting in casualties to both sides	1996 Gangneung submarine infiltration incident
1998	22 June	near Sokcho	9	Military confrontation	Sinking of damaged North Korean spy submarine under South Korean navy control	1998 Sokcho submarine incident
1999	30 June	Hwasung	23	Fire	Fire at children's summer camp dormitory	Sealand Youth Training Center Fire
1999	30 October	Inchon	54 to 65	Fire	Fire at illegal bar for underage drinkers	
2002	15 April	near Busan	129	Aviation accident	Pilot error leading to controlled flight into terrain	Air China Flight 129
2003	18 February	Daegu	192	Arson	Suicide attack by setting fire to a subway train	Daegu subway fire
2008	10 February	Seoul	0	Arson	Arson to historic Namdaemun gate	2008 Namdaemun fire
2008	20 October	Seoul	7	Mass murder	Arson and stabbing attack	Nonhyeon-dong massacre
2008	7 January	Icheon	40	Fire	Fire in warehouse under construction	2008 Icheon fire
2010	26 March	offshore near Baengnyeongdo	46	Military confrontation	North Korean attack	ROKS Cheonan sinking
2011	28 July	crashed near Jeju Island	2	Aviation accident	Crash resulting from fire in aircraft's cargo	Asiana Airlines Flight 991
2014	16 April	en route from Incheon to Jeju Island	304	Maritime accident	Sinking of ferry from crew error and overloading	Sinking of MV Sewol
2014	2 May	Seoul	0	Subway accident	Rear-end collision	2014 Seoul subway crash
2014	17 October	Seongnam	16	Structural failure	Ventilation grate collapse at K-pop concert	
2015	6 September	offshore near Chuja	18	Maritime accident	Fishing boat lost in heavy seas	Sinking of Dolgorae
2017	21 December	Jecheon	29	Fire	Electrical fire in a gym	Jecheon building fire
2018	20 January	Miryang	5	Fire	Arson attack on a hotel	
2018	26 January	Miryang	41	Fire	Unknown cause; lack of sprinklers	Miryang hospital fire
2018	June	Gunsan	5	Fire	Arson	
2018	19 August	Incheon	9	Fire	Fire in an electronics factory	
2018	9 November	Seoul	7	Fire	Fire caused by electric stove overheating	
2020	29 April	Icheon	39	Fire	Fire in a warehouse under construction	2020 Icheon fire
2021	9 June	Gwangju	9	Structural Failure	Construction error during demolition	2021 Gwangju building collapse
2022	9 June	Daegu	7	Arson	Attack on a law office	
2022	29 October	Seoul	159	Crowd crush	Crushing the crowd during Halloween festival	Seoul Halloween crowd crush
2024	24 June	Hwaseong, Gyeonggi	22	Fire	Accidental explosion in the warehouse of a lithium battery factory	Aricell battery factory fire
2024	1 July	Central Seoul	9	Automobile crash	Elderly driver reversed into a busy crosswalk.	
2024	29 December	Muan, South Jeolla	179	Aviation accident	Bird strike leading to an emergency landing that overshot the runway at Muan International Airport and crashed into a barrier.	Jeju Air Flight 2216

== See also ==
- List of disasters in South Korea by death toll
