= Daewang Corner fire =

1974 building fire in Seoul

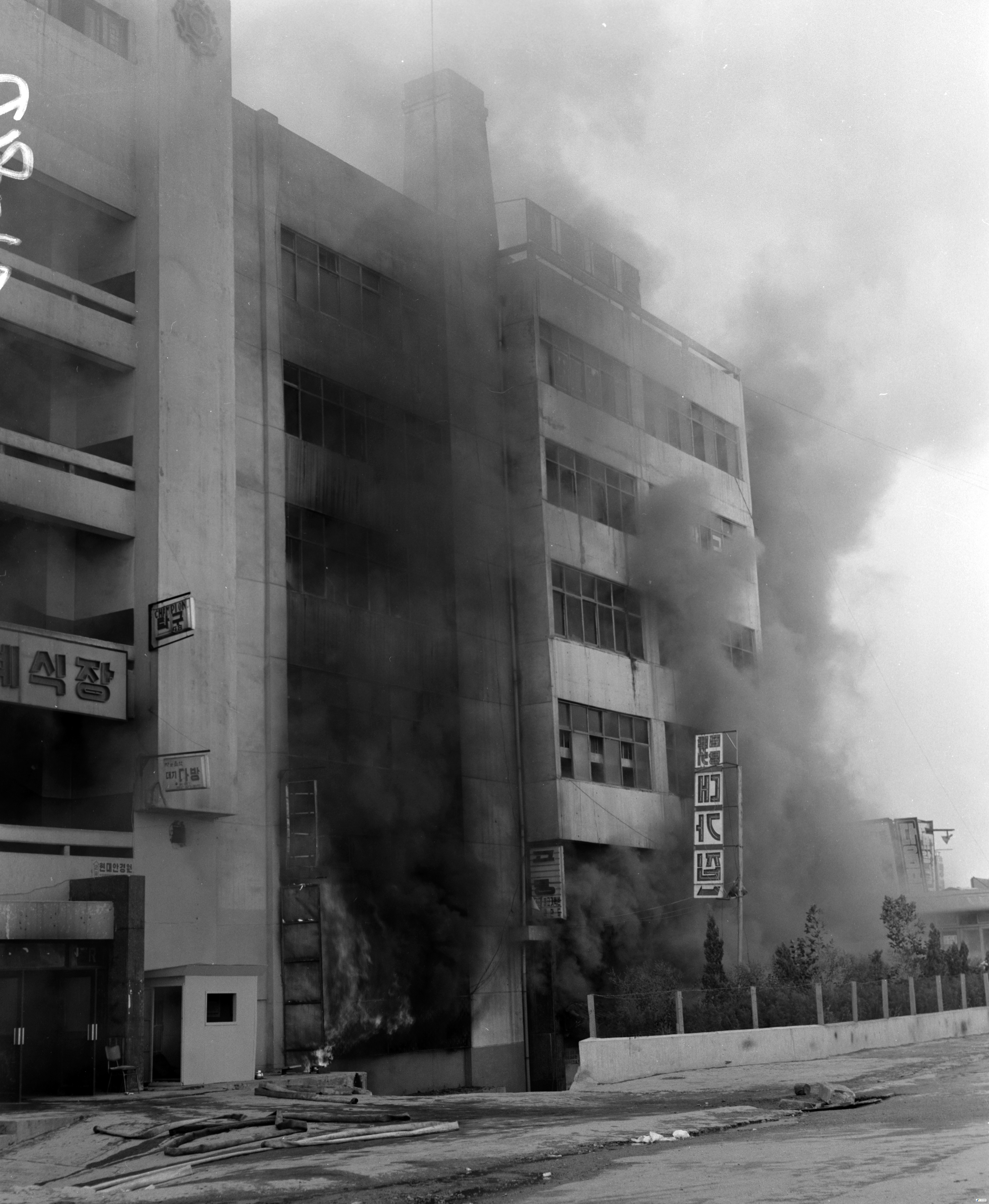
- Smoke seen surrounding the building as the fire continues to burn inside
- Native name: 대왕코너 화재
- Date: November 3, 1974
- Location: Dongdaemun District, Seoul, South Korea; 37.579804°N 127.046042°E
- Type: Building fire
- Cause: short circuit
- Deaths: 88
- Injuries: 35

On November 3, 1974, a deadly fire broke out in the Daewang Corner building in Dongdaemun, Seoul, South Korea, that killed 88 people and injured 35 more, mostly young adults. At the time it was one of the deadliest fires in Korean history. It was exacerbated by the employees' locking the doors to prevent people from leaving amidst the fire.

== Background ==
The Daewang Corner was an eight-story building that hosted multiple facilities, including restaurants, a department store, banks, offices, apartments, a hotel, and the Time Go‑Go night club. The building was constructed in 1968, and only four years later in 1972 it experienced its first tragedy when a propane explosion killed six people in a snack bar on the first floor.

== 1974 disaster ==
On November 3, 1974, at approximately 2:47 a.m., a fire broke out in room 618 of the Brown Hotel on the 6th floor due to a short circuit. After the Daeyeonggak Hotel fire, the government conducted fire drills for employees once a month, but none of the employees knew how to use fire extinguishers. The fire was first noticed when smoke seeped in, but there was only one door, and it was a revolving door, so people trying to escape would turn it from both sides, blocking the door and making it impossible to get out. Some people died when they got entangled in each other trying to escape through the windows, and some hotel guests fell to their deaths after breaking the glass and jumping out. The fire quickly engulfed the sixth floor, which housed the Time Go-Go Nightclub, and moved to the seventh floor, where the Mexican Cabaret lost power instantly, causing chaos. The extensive damage to the nightclub and cabaret stemmed from the club's flammable interior decoration, which had not been approved for final inspection. The club also ignored five separate orders to upgrade its firefighting equipment. Specifically, the Seoul Metropolitan Fire Department initially issued four administrative instructions to remove flammable interior decoration, and once ordered the club to install sprinklers and emergency broadcasting systems. However, these instructions were not followed. The nightclub where the fire occurred had already applied for a change of use in 1973, a year before the accident, without a final inspection due to the presence of flammable materials. Despite this, the club continued to operate illegally, serving Koreans only until 2:00 a.m., violating the foreign-only rule. The death toll stood at 88, with 35 injured. Two of the 88 victims remain unidentified. Dr. Kim Won-mook, the father-in-law of former National Assembly Speaker Chung Ui-hwa, also lost his life in this fire.

== See also ==
- List of disasters in South Korea by death toll
