= Min Sae-rom =

South Korean playwright and theater director (born 1980)

- Born: 1980 (age 45–46); Seoul, South Korea
- Education: Sogang University (Bachelor's degree in Business Administration and Sociology)
- Occupations: Theater director; Playwright; University professor
- Years active: 2005–present

Korean name
- Hangul: 민새롬
- RR: Min Saerom
- MR: Min Saerom

Min Sae-rom (Korean: 민새롬; born in 1974 in Seoul), is a South Korean actor, playwright, theater director, and lighting designer. He is also a professor at the School of Performing Arts at Chungkang College of Cultural Industries. For his contributions to the theater industry, Min received the Ministry of Culture, Sports and Tourism Award in 2017 and the Young Artist Award in Theater in 2025.

In 2005, Min won the Silver Prize and the Best Director Award at the National University Theater Festival for his play, Lovers in the Subway. He officially debuted as theater director in 2009 with the premiere of his play, Frontline Human, at the Seoul Fringe Festival. That same year, he established the Cheongnyeondan Theater Company.

== Early life and education ==
Min Sae-rom studied Business Administration and Sociology at Sogang University. He began his theatrical career as an actor in the university's theater club. He has stated that in the university club, it was customary for upperclassmen to handle the technical and production roles, while underclassmen took on the acting parts. After his mandatory military service, he found that many of the senior students had left, which led him to take on various staff responsibilities, including directing. This experience sparked his passion for the technical side of theater.

In 2005, Min won the Directing Award at the 27th National University Theatre Festival. His production, Lovers in the Subway, also won the Silver Prize. The festival is a national event for non-theater majors, inviting theater clubs from eight universities, supported by the Ministry of Education and Human Resources Development. Min credited the win to his team, saying, "I think the winning factor was the excellent theatrical elements captured by the stage, sound, and lighting staff in a highly flexible script."

== Career ==
=== As playwright and director ===
In 2009, Min established the Cheongnyeondan Theater Company and premiered his play, Frontline Human, which he also wrote and directed, at the Seoul Fringe Festival. The play was later performed at the Ansan Arts Center as part of its Open Space Project, and in 2010, it was staged at Sogang University's Mary Hall after being selected for the Sogang University Mary Hall Creative Support Project. In 2011, it was performed at the Gwacheon Cultural Center as part of the Gyeonggi Cultural Foundation Regional Culture and Arts Activity Support Project. Other early productions include the reading workshop for Which Star Are You From? (2010), the play Elephant at Sanullim Small Theater (2011), and Lovers in the Subway at the Ansan Arts Center (2011).

In 2012, Min and the Cheongnyeondan Theater Company participated in the "Gap@Hyehwa-dong 1-beonji" project. This initiative by the Hyehwadong1beonji Theater Lab, a notable hub for experimental theater, was designed to support emerging directors by providing them with opportunities and resources for stage adaptation and production development. As the project's first performance, Min directed the play Elephant, an adaptation of a short story by Raymond Carver, which ran from August 9 to 19, 2012.

Min also actively worked as a lighting designer for numerous productions, including the Seoul Performing Arts Festival's History of Madness and Choi Yong-hoon's How to Enjoy Home-Cooked Meal. He likes to explore the diversity and expansive potential of stage language.

In 2013, Min directed the play Without a Missing Word, which ran from November 10 to 12 at the Daehangno Arts Theater Small Theater. The play, written by Heo Jin-won, is about a man and a woman who spend a night together by chance. It was part of the "Spring Writer, Winter Stage" series, a program showcasing new works by writers selected in the New Year's Literary Contest, held by the Korea Performing Arts Center.

In 2014, Min directed the play The Grave Has Changed!, which was performed at the Seondol Theater from December 5–14. Written by playwright Lee Mi-kyung, winner of the 2012 Dong-A Theater Award, the production was selected for the Seoul Foundation for Arts and Culture's Arts Creation Support Program. The play is a humorous and lyrical story about a family collecting inheritance coupons and an elderly man preparing for his death, all set against the backdrop of a company that offers post-mortem services for busy modern people. The cast included Park Sang-jong, Cho Joo-hyun, Choi Jeong-hwa, and Na Jong-min.

=== Other venture ===
Min Sae-rom serves as a professor of playwriting at the School of Performing Arts at Chungkang College of Cultural Industries. He is also the Chairman of the Board of Directors of the Maeuldam Theater Cooperative.

== Theater ==
=== Musical ===
Musical play performance(s)
Year	Title		Role	Theater	Date	Ref.
Year	English	Korean	Role	Theater	Date	Ref.
2024	Thougtful Theater Trancendence	사유하는 극장 - 초월	Director	Yong Theater in the National Museum of Korea in Yongsan-gu	September 7 to 8	
2025	Thougtful Theater Sa-yU	사유하는 극장 Sa-yU	Director	Yong Theater in the National Museum of Korea in Yongsan-gu	October 31 to November 2	

=== Theater play ===
Theater play performance(s)
Year	Title		Role	Theater	Date	Ref.
Year	English	Korean	Role	Theater	Date	Ref.
2009	Frontline Human	전방인간	Director; Playwright	Seoul Fringe Festival	August	
2010	Which Star Are You From? (Note: Regular Reading Workshop)	넌 어느별에서 왔니?	Director	Hyehwa-dong Mudis Hall		
2010	Frontline Human (Note: selected for the 2011 Sogang University Incubating Project)	전방인간	Director; Playwright	Sogang University Mary Hall	July 2010	
2010	Frontline Human (Note: selected for the 2011 Ansan Open Space Project)	전방인간	Director; Playwright	Ansan Arts Center	July 2010	
2011	Frontline Human (Note: Selected for the 2011 Gyeonggi Cultural Foundation Regional Cultural and Arts Activity Support Program)	전방인간	Director; Playwright	Gwacheon Citizens' Hall Small Theater	November 2011	
2011	Lovers in the Subway	지하철의 연인들	Director	Ansan Arts Center	September 16–18, 2011	
2013	2013 Spring Writer, Winter Stage - Without Embellishments	2013 봄 작가 겨울 무대 - 미사여구없이	Director	Daehakro Arts Theater Small Theater	November 10 – 12	
2014	The Grave Has Changed	무덤이 바뀌었어요	Director	Daehakro Sundol Theater	December 5 – 14	
2015	Three Men in a Bathhouse	목욕탕집 세 남자	Lighting Design	Hyehwadang Small Theater	June 9 – 14	
2017	The Fairy King	요정의 왕	Director	Project Box Cya	February 17 – 19	
2017	Manseon	만선	Lighting Design	Suncheon Culture and Arts Center	December 14 – 15	
2017	The Fairy King	요정의 왕	Director, Script	Project Box Cya	December 27 – January 6, 2018	
2018	My Elenin	나의 엘레닌	Director	Yeonwoo Small Theater	March 22 – 25	
2018	9th National and Public Theater Festival Gyeongju - Jungang-dong 124	제9회 국공립극단 페스티벌 경주 - 중앙동 124번지	Lighting Design	Gyeongju Arts Center Small Performance Hall	July 15	
2018	Distant Neighbor	머나먼 이웃	Director	Miarigogae Arts Theater	August 16 – 19	
2018	Christians	민새롬 - 크리스천스	Director	Daehakro Arts Theater Small Theater	September 27 – October 7	
2019	2019 Sero Reading Festival	2019 서로 낭독 페스티벌	Director	Seochon Gonggansero	May 16 – June 23	
2019	Almond	아몬드	Director	Sejong Center for the Performing Arts S Theater	September 19 – 25	
2019	Mend the Living	살아있는 자를 수선하기	Director	Wooran Foundation Hall 2	December 13 – 21	
2020	Le Fils	아들 Le Fils	Director	Yes24 Art One 2	September 15 – November 22	
2021	Almond	아몬드	Director	Goyang Aram Nuri Theater	May 15 – 30	
2021	Mend the Living	살아있는 자를 수선하기	Director	National Jeongdong Theater	June 1 – 27	
2022	Almond	아몬드	Director	Goyang Aram Nuri Theater	May 6 – 28	
2022	Mend the Living	살아있는 자를 수선하기	Director	Lee Hae-rang Arts Theater	July 26 – September 4	
2022	On the Beat	온 더 비트	Director	Daehakro TOM 2	November 21 – January 1, 2023	
2023	A Tree on the Hill	나무 위의 군대	Director	LG Arts Center Seoul U+ Stage	June 20 – August 12	
2024	Mend the Living	살아있는 자를 수선하기	Director	National Jeongdong Theater	Jan 20 – Mar 20	
2024	Jellyfish	젤리피쉬	Director	Modu Arts Theater	May 22 to 28, 2024	
2025	The Effect	디 이펙트	Director	NOL Seogyeong Square Scone 2nd Building	June 10, 2025, to August 31, 2025	
2025	The Effect	디 이펙트	Director	NOL Seogyeong Square Scone 2nd Building	July 23 to 26, 2025	
2025	National Theater Company [2025 Special Invitational Pick Clinic] Jellyfish	국립극단 [2025 기획초청 Pick크닉] 젤리피쉬	Director	National Theater Company of Korea Myeongdong Arts Theater	September 12 to 21, 2025	
2026	Secret Passage: Interval	비밀통로 : Interval	Director	NOL Theater, Middle Theater	February 13 to May 3	

== Accolades ==
=== Awards and nominations ===
Award ceremony	Year	Category	Nominee	Result	Ref.
DongA Theater Awards	2025	Best Play	Jellyfish	Won	
National University Theater Festival	2005	Silver Prize	Lovers in the Subway	Won	
National University Theater Festival	2005	Best Director Award	Lovers in the Subway	Won	

=== State honors ===
List of State Honour
Country	Award Ceremony	Year	Honor	Ref.
South Korea	Minister of Culture, Sports and Tourism	2017	Minister of Culture, Sports and Tourism Award	
South Korea	The National Academy of Arts of the Republic of Korea	2025	Young Artists Award	
