= Korea Tourism College =

Private junior college in Icheon, South Korea

- Hangul: 한국관광대학교
- Hanja: 韓國觀光大學校
- RR: Hanguk gwangwang daehakgyo
- MR: Han'guk kwan'gwang taehakkyo

Korea Tourism College is a college located in Icheon, South Korea specializing in tourism.
