= Cheonho Bridge bus crash =

1988 bus crash in South Korea

Details
- Date: April 1, 1988; 5:50 PM
- Location: 200 m (660 ft) from Cheonho Bridge, Gangdong District, Seoul
- Country: South Korea
- Owner: Songpa Transportation
- Incident type: Fall off a bridge
- Cause: Tire burst

Statistics
- Passengers: 54
- Deaths: 19
- Injured: 35

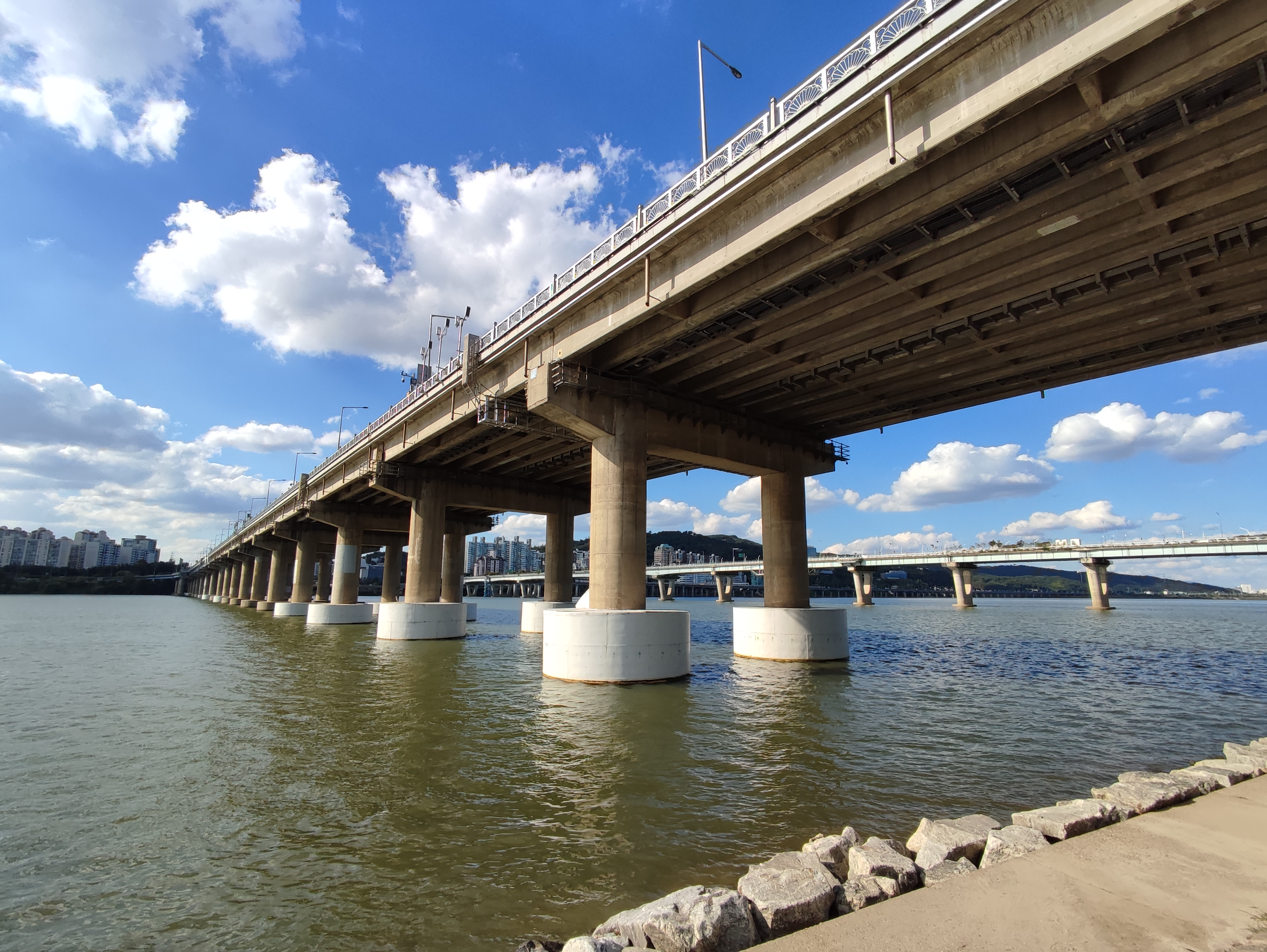
Cheonho Bridge, the site of the accident

At approximately 5:50 PM on April 1, 1988, a bus carrying 54 passengers fell approximately 20 m (66 ft) into the Han River below from a point approximately 200 m (660 ft) south of the Cheonho Bridge in Cheonho-dong, Gangdong District, Seoul, South Korea. It resulted in numerous casualties.

== Accident ==
This accident occurred while speeding to catch the next bus. At around 5:50 PM on April 1, 1988, a city bus No. 572 belonging to Songpa Transportation was traveling toward Cheonho-dong when it overtook a car ahead of it on Cheonho Bridge and started speeding down the first lane at about 100 km/h. The bus then crossed the center line when its left front tire burst, causing the bus driver to lost control. The bus crashed into eight railings on the opposite side of the bridge and fell into the river below.

== Cause of the accident ==
Multiple issues were tied to the cause of the accident. One being the use of old, cheap retread tires on buses for cost-saving reasons. The reckless driving by the bus driver in attempt to meet the next departure time was also a major factor. In other words, if the reckless use of retread tires was the direct cause of the accident, the reckless driving to meet the next departure time was the decisive cause. Additionally, the possibility of poor inspection of the city buses themselves was also discussed, but a paper was published that found that the main cause of city bus accidents was precisely the departure time, which attracted attention.

== Aftermath ==
This accident killed 19 passengers, and seriously injured 35. Several people immediately died from the impact of the bus plummeting into the shallow riverbed, while other passengers died after becoming entangled and being unable to swim to the surface. In addition, the accident occurred at a time when students were getting off school, so many of the passengers were students. Furthermore, during the process of salvaging the completely destroyed bus, a large steel beam from a crane collided with two ambulances waiting nearby. In the wake of this disaster, the government completely banned the use of retread tires on the front wheels of commercial buses, and even if their use was permitted, it was regulated to be used only on the rear wheels of vehicles with two-wheel drive. The two companies that supplied retread tires to the city bus company responsible for the accident were investigated to see if they were unlicensed, and many executives, including the city bus company's CEO and executive director, as well as the crew and inspectors of the bus that was involved in the accident, were arrested, indicted, or replaced. However, the driver of the bus involved in the accident was found not guilty by the court on February 22, 1989. Then, on January 3, 1992, the Supreme Court of Korea dismissed the prosecution's appeal and the final not guilty verdict was reached.
