= Iri station explosion =

1977 railway accident in South Korea

Iri Station Explosion

Details
- Date: 11 November 1977
- Location: Iri, now Iksan
- Coordinates: 35.94062°N 126.94636°E
- Country: South Korea
- Incident type: Munitions Explosion

Statistics
- Trains: 1
- Deaths: 59
- Injured: 1300+

The Iri station explosion was a disaster that occurred in Iri, North Jeolla, South Korea on November 11, 1977, at 9:15 p.m. About 40 tons of dynamite carried in a freight train Gwangju exploded at Iri station. The town and train station have both been rechristened as Iksan. At least 59 people were killed.

== Damage ==
=== Deaths and injuries ===
The explosion killed 59 people and seriously injured 185 others; altogether, over 1,300 people were injured. At the time, the population of Iri numbered around 130,000 people.

=== Infrastructure and property ===
The force of the explosion carved a crater ten meters deep and thirty meters wide. Most structures within a 500-meter radius from the site of the explosion were severely damaged. Approximately 9,500 buildings were affected by the explosion, which left about 10,000 people homeless. Residential apartment buildings, the city's first, were constructed to accommodate the displaced.

=== Financial and political costs ===
Financial damage was extensive; property losses alone were estimated to be ₩23 billion; the government allocated ₩13 billion for the recovery effort.

Transportation Minister Choi Kyung-rok resigned soon thereafter.

== See also ==
- 1995 Daegu gas explosions
