= Typhoon Olive (1971) =

Western Pacific typhoon in 1971

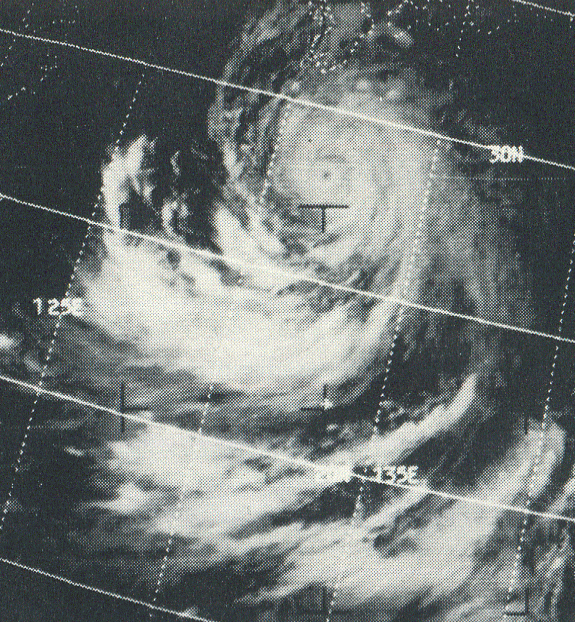
- Olive nearing peak intensity on August 3, with the island of Kyushu in Japan visible to the north.

Meteorological history
- Formed: July 29, 1971
- Extratropical: August 9
- Dissipated: August 10, 1971

Unknown-strength storm
- 10-minute sustained (JMA)
- Lowest pressure: 935 hPa (mbar); 27.61 inHg

Category 2-equivalent typhoon
- 1-minute sustained (SSHWS/JTWC)
- Highest winds: 155 km/h (100 mph)
- Lowest pressure: 935 hPa (mbar); 27.61 inHg

Overall effects
- Fatalities: 90 confirmed
- Missing: 7
- Damage: Unknown
- Areas affected: Caroline Islands, Northern Mariana Islands, Ryukyu Islands, Korea, Japan, South Sakhalin, Kuril Islands
- Part of the 1971 Pacific typhoon season

Typhoon Olive was an erratic and slightly long-lived tropical cyclone that impacted Japan and affected Manchuria during early-August 1971. It severely disrupted the 13th World Scout Jamboree, which was being held in Fujinomiya, Shizuoka Prefecture. The twentieth depression, nineteenth named storm, and twelfth typhoon of the 1971 Pacific typhoon season, the system was first noted as an area of circulation in a near-equatorial trough, located to the east of Guam on July 24. After moving through the area, the system took a northward direction due to the influence of a trough. It then commenced a northeast move before organizing, though it didn't strengthen to a tropical depression until July 29. Slow but gradual intensification occurred, becoming a tropical storm in the early hours of July 31 as it moved to the west, before taking a north-northwest track as it intensified to a typhoon on August 2 while approaching the Ryukyu Islands. On the next day, it reached its peak intensity of 155 km/h (95 mph) and an unusually low barometric pressure of 935 mbar, equivalent to a mid-level typhoon as it started to batter the third-largest island of Japan, Kyushu. It then moved to the north, while weakening back to a minimal typhoon before making landfall on the area, with the records pointing it to the east of Nagasaki on August 5. It rapidly weakened while traversing Kyushu, before entering the Sea of Japan. At this time, it passed near the southern part of Korea before curving to the northeast. It then passed near the Russian region of Primorsky Krai in Outer Manchuria before weakening below gale-force, shortly before becoming extratropical as it passed through the La Pérouse Strait on August 9. It then accelerated through the Pacific Ocean before dissipating on the next day.

90 deaths were attributed from Olive, with the majority in Japan. The system also caused widespread flooding and landslides through the country and nearby South Korea. The total damages are unknown.

== Meteorological history ==
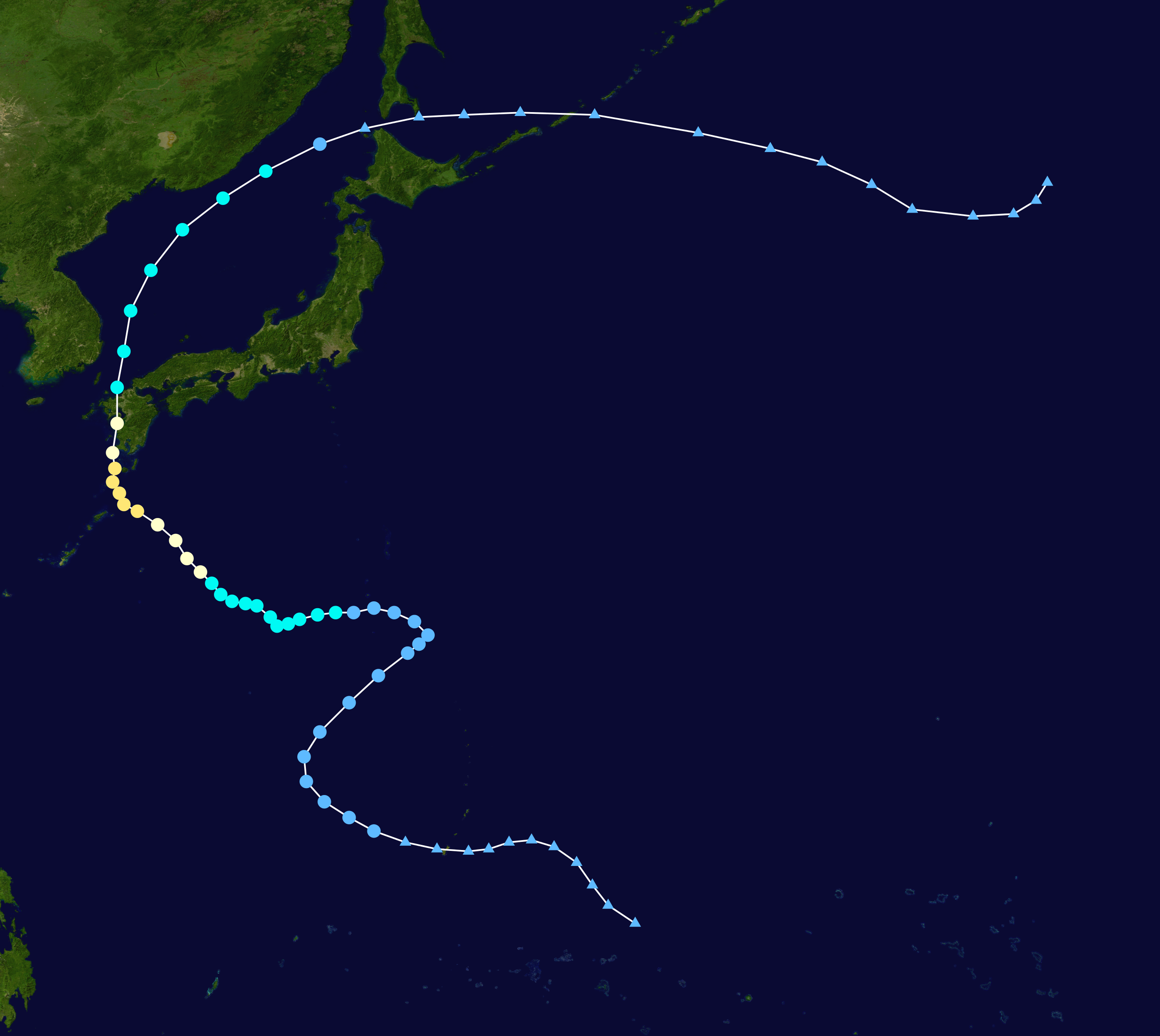
Map plotting the storm's track and intensity, according to the Saffir–Simpson scale Map key Saffir–Simpson scale Tropical depression (≤38 mph, ≤62 km/h) Tropical storm (39–73 mph, 63–118 km/h) Category 1 (74–95 mph, 119–153 km/h) Category 2 (96–110 mph, 154–177 km/h) Category 3 (111–129 mph, 178–208 km/h) Category 4 (130–156 mph, 209–251 km/h) Category 5 (≥157 mph, ≥252 km/h) Unknown Storm type Tropical cyclone Subtropical cyclone Extratropical cyclone, remnant low, tropical disturbance, or monsoon depression

At 06:00 UTC on July 24, the China Meteorological Agency started to monitor an area of scattered convection and circulation in weather maps which was located in a near-equatorial trough, located to the east of Guam. The agency estimated the barometric pressure of the disturbance to be 1010 mbar at that time. Nearly two days after, the agency upgraded the system to a weak tropical depression, estimating the sustained winds to be at 35 km/h (20 mph), despite the disturbance being highly disorganized at that time. On July 29, at 08:00 UTC, the Joint Typhoon Warning Center stated that the disturbance was now detected in their radar imagery and also started to watch the system's movement. Also at that time, the CMA upgraded the system to a tropical storm based on their estimations. At that time, the disturbance is highly disorganized, with its convection steered to the northeast, possibly due to the hostile environment where the system formed. It started to move to the west while slowly consolidating before curving to the northeast, due to the influence of a subtropical ridge to its north. Throughout the day, its circulation became defined, although it remained disorganized. As the said ridge began to strengthen and dominate, the system turned sharply to the west in the early hours of July 30. It then slowly meandered on the area, where its organization became defined on satellite imagery. Between 11:00 and 12:00 UTC of that day, the JTWC upgraded the system to a tropical storm and named it Olive. The system had a good outflow, as being evidenced by radar imagery.

Olive then slightly moved to the west-northwest before taking a north-northwestward track due to the weakness of another subtropical ridge, which was located near the Philippines. The system also slowed down, before intensifying to a severe tropical storm at 18:00 UTC on the next day as the forward motion of the storm speeded. Another ridge pulled the system to the northwest before again, slowing down as Olive became poorly defined on satellite images. On 12:00 UTC on August 1, the CMA upgraded the system to a minimal typhoon based on an estimate of 68 knots and an emerging eye; however, the JTWC only elevated the system's intensity to typhoon status at the same time on the next day. The system then accelerated to the northwest before intensifying further to a Category 2 typhoon at 12:00 UTC on August 3 and reached its peak intensity shortly, with maximum sustained winds of 155 km/h (95 mph) and an unusually low minimum barometric pressure of 935 mbar, as being recorded by a reconnaissance aircraft. It then started to slow down and impact the northern part of the Ryukyu Islands, with Olive passing near Yakushima Island before midnight at its peak. With the influence of a long-wave trough near the coast of East China, the system took a northward motion before making landfall on the main Japanese island of Kyushu, near Nagasaki Prefecture on the early hours of August 5 as it weakened to a minimal typhoon due to the interaction with the island. It rapidly unraveled to a tropical storm as it passed through Saga Prefecture before moving through the Sea of Japan before midday. It then made its closest approach with South Korea on August 6 before starting to curve to the northeast. Olive then neared Nakhodka in Primorsky Krai on August 8 before weakening further to a tropical depression, shortly before becoming extratropical early the next day.

The extratropical remnants of Olive then passed through the La Pérouse Strait, a strait which separates the Russian island of Sakhalin and northern part of Hokkaido in Japan before moving through the Pacific Ocean before dissipating on August 10 near the International Date Line.

== Preparations and impact ==
=== Japan ===
Starting from October 4, the meteorological forecasters in the country are preparing for the brunt of Olive. Rains were expected to be torrential and floods were also predicted. Train and airline services in Kyushu were suspended, starting on August 5.

A conducted research about Olive reported that the rain more dominated than the winds, classifying the system as a rain typhoon. Heavy inundation damages were also seen throughout the southern part of Japan. The Yakushima Station in Yakushima Island reported winds up to 80 knots and a minimum pressure of 938.7 mb, while no reports of damages were seen. In Kasedashi City, Kagoshima, torrential downpours broke the embankment of the Kaseda River, flooding houses and establishments near the area. The Kuma River in Kumamoto Prefecture also overflowed, destroying 209 houses and flooding 2,647 more. The dam in the prefecture, namely Ichifusa Dam, also released large amounts of water to avoid failure, flooding its lake and destroying some houses nearby.

A rainfall amount of 59.8 inches in Ebino, Miyazaki Prefecture were recorded causing widespread landslides, which killed 69 individuals. The avalanche also destroyed houses and injured 209 persons, with the majority are because they are rescued from getting trapped in their houses. Authorities in seas reported that 27 boats sunk in the Pacific Ocean and Sea of Japan, while two more large ships were agrounded; however, no names of the ships were given to the authorities. All transportations, including train services, air traffic, sea services and shipping were suspended and affected, while incomplete reports said that 77 roads throughout Kyushu were destroyed. Rainshowers were also reported as far as Tokyo, according to some individuals.

Total deaths from Olive in Japan were at 69, while the damages were unknown.

==== 13th World Scout Jamboree ====
The typhoon heavily disrupted the activities of the 13th World Scout Jamboree, which was held in Fujinomiya, Shizuoka Prefecture from August 2 to 10, also the week when Olive formed. The rains started to pour on August 3, but this is due to an existing front. The aftermath of the rains caused floods that reached their campsite. in Mount Fuji. As a result, the Japanese Boy Scout Officials there ordered the mandatory evacuations of the scouts to an unknown place. The event was also attended by Neil Armstrong; however, the scouts are gone as the astronaut went there. Later reports said that the scouts went to different sites such as temples, city halls, nearby schools, and the Self-Defense Force base. The evacuation was hampered by tourist busses and tourists that went on Tokyo to see Prince Akihito; however, this was also canceled following the typhoon.

As Olive battered Shizuoka Prefecture between August 8 and 10, torrential rains and gale-force winds destroyed some tents and the campsite was reported to be flooded and washed out. No deaths and injuries were reported throughout the event; however, this resulted in limited activities on the campground of the scouts, according to the headquarters of the Boy Scouts of America in New Brunswick.

=== South Korea ===
Despite not making landfall at any part of South Korea, Olive caused damages on the southern coasts of the country. A rainfall amount of 390.8 mm and a total of 444.0 mm were recorded at Samcheok, Gangwon Province. Ulleungdo recorded the lowest barometric pressure from the storm at 976.2 hPa and the fastest instantaneous wind speed from Olive, at 32.0 m/s. while Pohang reported the fastest wind speed, at 19.3 m/s. Reports from different institutions and agencies, including Seoul's National Disaster Relief Center, said that Olive killed 27 in the country, all for unknown reasons. Flash floods and widespread landslides were also seen.

== See also ==
- Typhoon Trix (1971) - caused 44 more deaths and a damage of $50.6 million (1971 USD).
- Typhoon Virginia (1971) - caused 56 deaths from landslides, not a month after Trix and Olive.
