= Sealand Youth Training Center Fire =

Defunct children's summer camp in South Korea

Coordinates: 37°07′59″N 126°40′49″E

- Date: June 30, 1999
- Location: Hwasung, South Korea
- Type: Fire
- Deaths: 23

The Sealand Youth Training Center (Korean: 씨랜드 청소년수련원) was a summer educational camp for young children, located near Hwasung, South Korea. In the early morning hours of June 30, 1999, the dormitory, housing approximately 430 children and their teachers, was consumed by fire. Nineteen children and four adults died.

== Background ==
The previous year, Hwasung Council had approved the youth center as a steel-framed reinforced-concrete one-story structure. Fifty-four cargo containers had been stacked atop the concrete base and covered with wood and corrugated iron to provide additional space. The cargo containers had been given ceilings made of styrofoam, a highly flammable material which gives off toxic gas when burning. There was no fire sprinkler system, and most of the center's fire extinguishers were not working. The dormitory had two exits, both narrow stairways that hampered evacuation. Survivors said that they never heard a fire alarm.

Hwasung Council inspectors carried out two safety inspections in the year prior to the blaze, and had passed the center both times. The council had approved the access road, which was too narrow to admit fire engines.

== Fire ==
The fire, which was eventually blamed on a lit mosquito repellent coil, broke out shortly after midnight. Due to the abundance of flammable materials, the entire structure was quickly engulfed in flames. Though the fire started at about 12:30 a.m., firefighters in neighboring Sosin did not receive the alarm until around 1:30. By the time they arrived at around 2 a.m., the structure was already beginning to collapse. Crews from 50 fire engines fought for over three hours to bring the fire under control. Fire department officials blamed the delay in calling for help on the fact that the center's staff lacked adequate training in how to respond to emergencies. Others attributed the delay to the fact that the fire damaged the center's phone line.

Kang Kwon-Soo, the president of a kindergarten in Puchon, was at the center with his students. He described fleeing the blaze: "[T]he hall ways were too narrow, dark and covered in smoke. This resulted in great chaos. Teachers and students scurrying to escape the inferno got entangled with each other and tumbled to the ground. Some were screaming in terror while others were crying in agonized pain. It was like hell on earth." Twenty-four-year-old Kim Young-ho, an instructor at the camp, stated that he ran from door to door to announce the fire, but he could not open the door into Room 301.

Six-year-old Kang Yu-Jong, who was hospitalized for burns, said: "I woke up in the middle of the night because of the hot floor. I saw furniture burning in the corner and the room filled with smoke. A teacher helped me and other kids out of the room but four other children could not get out because the flames were too fierce. As soon as we got outside, burning windows fell to the ground from the second and third floors."

== Casualties ==
Eighteen of the children, including all of those sleeping in room 301, were from the Somang Kindergarten in Seoul. One child in Room 223 died. The bodies of the children in room 301 were found huddled together and hugging one another, cornered by the flames that were near the door. It took forensic scientists two weeks to identify all the bodies.

Most of the victims were between five and seven years of age, and were either killed by the flames or by inhalation of the toxic fumes. The victims' bodies were burnt beyond recognition. Two other children and an adult were injured.

== Aftermath ==
Kwon Yang-sook, the first lady of South Korea, held a reception for relatives of the victims on July 3, 2003.

Sealand owner Park Jae Chun and six Hwasung council members were charged with involuntary manslaughter and violation of building laws, in addition to bribery charges. Park was also charged with bribing council officials in order to get the necessary clearance to build and operate the center. He was also alleged to have paid a construction designer 14 million won (c. $14,000 U.S.) in order to borrow his construction license. Four architects and builders were also arrested.

Thirty-five-year-old Chun Kyong-ja, the head of the Somang Kindergarten in Seoul, along with her husband and another teacher, were also arrested and charged with involuntary homicide for their role in the children's deaths. Rather than overseeing their charges in room 301, they were elsewhere, drinking. Reports differ as to whether they were in another room or outside the building.

=== Public reactions ===
The deaths led to a public outcry for greater enforcement of safety standards.

== See also ==
- 1999 Inchon Beer Hope Fire
- List of disasters in South Korea by death toll
