= Chungkang College of Cultural Industries =

Technical college in Icheon, South Korea

- 청강문화산업대학
- Motto in English: Only One, Only the Best
- Type: Private college
- Founder: Lee Yeon-ho
- President: Choi Sung-shin
- Students: 3,724 (2024)
- Location: Icheon, Gyeonggi-do, South Korea; 37.20417°N 127.35470°E
- Colors: CK Orange
- Website: ck.ac.kr
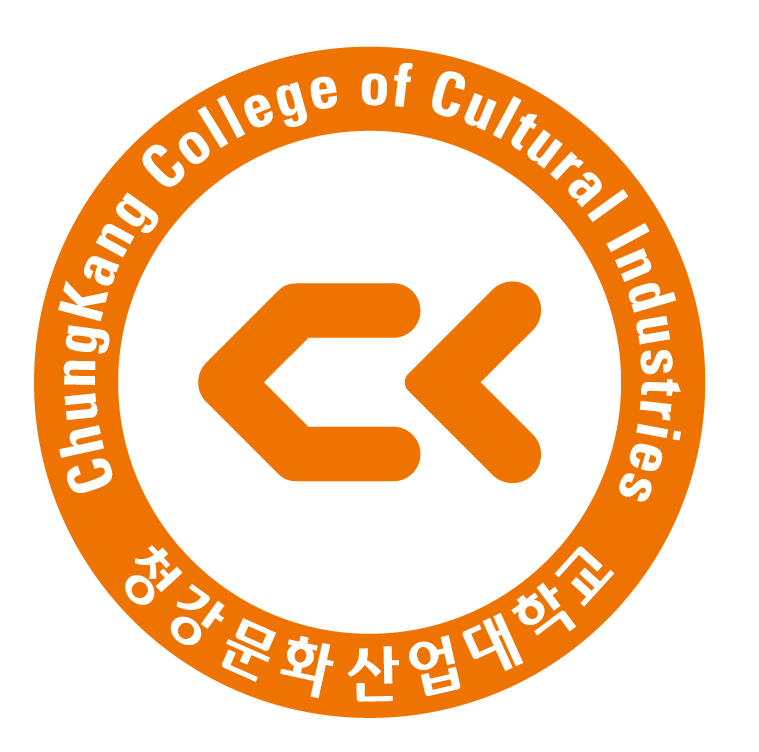

- Chungkang College of Cultural Industries
- Hangul: 청강문화산업대학
- Hanja: 靑江文化産業大學
- RR: Cheonggang munhwa saneop daehak
- MR: Ch'ŏnggang munhwa sanŏp taehak

Chungkang College of Cultural Industries (Korean: 청강문화산업대학교) is a private college in Icheon, Gyeonggi Province, South Korea, specializing in cultural and creative content education.

It offers a wide range of programs in fields such as Animation, Game, Manhwa (Comics, Webtoons), Performing Arts, Fashion & Beauty Style, and Culinary Arts, fostering professionals in Korea's cultural industries.

The campus provides advanced production facilities and an industry-linked learning environment where students can gain hands-on experience through project-based education and collaboration with professionals.

== Academics ==
Chungkang College operates seven specialized schools: Animation, Manhwa (Comics & Webtoons, Web novels), Game, Content Convergence, Culinary Arts, Fashion & Beauty Style, and Performing Arts. Each school delivers unique programs designed to cultivate talent for the cultural industries.

Associate Degree Program (3-years)
School (Departments)	Majors
School of Animation	Animation
School of Manhwa Contents	Webtoon and Comics
	Manhwa Character Illustration
	Web Novel and Creation
School of Game	Game
School of Content Convergence	Content Convergence
School of Fashion & Beauty Style	Styling
School of Culinary Arts	Culinary Arts
School of Performing Arts	Musical Theatre Acting
	Playwriting & Directing
	Stage Design

Bachelor's Degree Program

(1-year)

Department of Animation
Department of Webtoon and Web Novel Content
Department of Next-Generation Game Content
Department of Performing Arts
Department of Fashion Content

== History ==
Chungkang College of Cultural Industries was established in 1996. The college has developed from a junior college into an institution specializing in cultural contents.

December 1995: Established as Chungkang College of Cultural Industries

March 1996: Official opening of the college

November 1998: Opening of The Manhwa and Media Library (만화영상도서관)

May 2001: Completion of the Main Building

September 2001: Opening of Eoulmok (어울목), the student welfare center

May 2002: Completion of the Culture Sarang Hall (문화사랑관)

December 2002: Opening of the Chungkang Museum of Manhwa History (만화박물관)

November 2005: Completion of Eoullim Hall (어울림관)

December 2008: Establishment of the university-affiliated enterprise CCRC (Chungkang Creative Research Center)

August 2009: Establishment of the college-affiliated enterprise Cultura

November 2021: Opening of the Practice Library (연습도서관)

September 2022: Approval for new Bachelor's Degree Advancement Programs (Departments of Animation, Next-Generation Game Contents, and Webtoon & Web Novel Contents)

== Notable alumni ==
- Webtoon Creator: Kwang Jin 광진 (Itaewon Class original webtoon series, later adapted into a drama)
- Webtoon Creator: Kim Carnbi 김칸비 (Sweet Home (webtoon) original webtoon series, later adapted into a Netflix Original Sereies)
- Webtoon Creator: 기맹기(Gangnam Beauty original webtoon series, later adapted into a drama)
