= Sinking of Dolgorae =

2015 maritime incident in South Korea

- Date: 5 September 2015
- Location: Southwest coast of South Korea near the island of Chuja
- Cause: High waves
- Outcome: Ship sank
- Deaths: 10 dead, 8 missing
Vessel summary
- Type: Fishing vessel
- Tonnage: 9.8 GT
- Survivors: 3
- On board: 21

The sinking of Dolgorae, a South Korean fishing vessel occurred on 5 September 2015 off Chuja Island, near Jeju Island. At least ten people died and eight are missing. Three people were rescued. The vessel capsized in heavy seas and those passengers and crew not washed away in the waves clung to the hull of the vessel for over ten hours. Only three were rescued.

== Sinking ==
The 9.8-tonne (10.8-ton) vessel was reportedly transporting 21 people off the southwest coast of South Korea near Chuja Island. During the night on 6 September, high waves swamped the vessel and the captain ordered those aboard Dolgorae (meaning "dolphin") to abandon ship. The vessel capsized almost immediately with some passengers being swept away by the waves. The rest clung to the capsized hull of Dolgorae, with only three still holding on until they were rescued ten hours after the vessel capsized.

== Rescue and aftermath ==
At 20:40, a call was placed with the South Korean Coast Guard Chuja Safety Center by another fishing boat after Dolgorae had not answered the second vessel's hails. The Coast Guard dispatched three patrol vessels. Meanwhile, the Safety Center was calling the listed passengers. Four were deemed not to have taken the boat, while three unregistered passengers had taken their place. Three people were rescued from the capsized hull of Dolgorae. Ten people were found dead and eight remained missing. More than 50 Republic of Korea Navy and South Korean Coast Guard vessels, as well as a Lynx helicopter and a P-3C maritime patrol plane were involved in the search for the eight missing. Of the three unregistered passengers, two were found dead and one was rescued. An investigation was commenced and among the findings was that the passengers and crew were not wearing their lifejackets.
