= 2008 Icheon fire =

Accidental fire in Icheon, South Korea

On 7 January 2008, a fire occurred in Icheon, South Korea, killing 40 workers as they were injecting urethane foam into the walls of the 20,000 square-meter basement. It happened at a cool warehouse that was under construction at a refrigerated goods facility. More than 500 firefighters fought the fire from which witnesses claimed to hear multiple explosions. Along with thick black smoke, toxic fumes hampered interior-attack firefighting operations. Holes were subsequently drilled in the roof to allow the toxins and smoke to escape.

It was the deadliest fire in South Korea since the Daegu subway fire on 18 February 2003, which killed 192 people. A different fire in Icheon on 29 April 2020 killed 38 people.

== See also ==
- List of man-made disasters in South Korea
