= Icheon =

City in Gyeonggi, South Korea

- Municipal City
- Panoramic view of Icheon

- Flag

- Location in South Korea
- Coordinates: 37°16′N 127°26′E
- Country: South Korea
- Region: Sudogwon
- Province: Gyeonggi
- Administrative divisions: 2 eup, 8 myeon, 4 dong

Government
  - Mayor: Seong Su-suk (성수석)

Area
  - Total: 461.3 km^{2} (178.1 sq mi)

Population (September 2024)
  - Total: 223,422
  - Density: 485.8/km^{2} (1,258/sq mi)
  - Dialect: Seoul
- Website: icheon.go.kr

Korean name
- Hangul: 이천시
- Hanja: 利川市
- RR: Icheon-si
- MR: Ich'ŏn-si

Icheon (Korean: 이천; Korean pronunciation: [i.tɕʰʌn]) is a city in Gyeonggi Province, South Korea. Together with Yeoju, Icheon is known as a center of South Korean ceramic manufacturing and is a UNESCO City of Crafts and Folk Art. Other famous local products include peaches and rice. Local institutions of higher learning include Korea Tourism College and Chungkang College of Cultural Industries. The city is also home to SK Hynix, the world's second largest memory chip maker.

== Geography ==
Neighboring districts include Yeoju, Gwangju, Yongin, and Anseong within Gyeonggi Province, as well as Eumseong County in North Chungcheong Province.

The Yeongdong Expressway and Jungbu Naeryuk Expressway pass through Icheon. In 2016, the city will connect into the Seoul Metropolitan Subway via Yeoju Line's Icheon Station.

=== Administrative divisions ===
Icheon is divided into 2 towns (eup), 8 townships (myeon), and 4 neighbourhoods (dong).

| | Hangul | Hanja |
|---|---|---|
| Janghowon-eup | 장호원읍 | 長湖院邑 |
| Bubal-eup | 부발읍 | 夫鉢邑 |
| Sindun-myeon | 신둔면 | 新屯面 |
| Baeksa-myeon | 백사면 | 栢沙面 |
| Hobeop-myeon | 호법면 | 戶法面 |
| Majang-myeon | 마장면 | 麻長面 |
| Daewol-myeon | 대월면 | 大月面 |
| Moga-myeon | 모가면 | 暮加面 |
| Seolseong-myeon | 설성면 | 雪星面 |
| Yul-myeon | 율면 | 栗面 |
| Changjeon-dong | 창전동 | 倉前洞 |
| Jeungpo-dong | 증포동 | 增浦洞 |
| Jungni-dong | 중리동 | 中里洞 |
| Gwango-dong | 관고동 | 官庫洞 |

== Population and Business ==
There are 230,000 people living, including about 220,000 Koreans and 11,000 foreigners. More than 1,200 companies employ about 40,000 people.

== Climate ==
Icheon has a humid continental climate (Dwa in the Köppen climate classification).

Climate data for Icheon (1991–2020 normals, extremes 1972–present)
| Month | Jan | Feb | Mar | Apr | May | Jun | Jul | Aug | Sep | Oct | Nov | Dec | Year |
|---|---|---|---|---|---|---|---|---|---|---|---|---|---|
| Record high °C (°F) | 14.5 (58.1) | 20.8 (69.4) | 25.7 (78.3) | 32.5 (90.5) | 33.7 (92.7) | 36.0 (96.8) | 38.3 (100.9) | 39.4 (102.9) | 34.5 (94.1) | 29.1 (84.4) | 25.4 (77.7) | 18.2 (64.8) | 39.4 (102.9) |
| Mean daily maximum °C (°F) | 2.7 (36.9) | 6.0 (42.8) | 12.2 (54.0) | 19.3 (66.7) | 24.4 (75.9) | 27.9 (82.2) | 29.4 (84.9) | 30.2 (86.4) | 26.0 (78.8) | 20.4 (68.7) | 12.1 (53.8) | 4.4 (39.9) | 17.9 (64.2) |
| Daily mean °C (°F) | −3.1 (26.4) | −0.3 (31.5) | 5.4 (41.7) | 11.9 (53.4) | 17.6 (63.7) | 22.0 (71.6) | 24.7 (76.5) | 25.0 (77.0) | 19.8 (67.6) | 13.0 (55.4) | 5.8 (42.4) | −1.2 (29.8) | 11.7 (53.1) |
| Mean daily minimum °C (°F) | −8.5 (16.7) | −6.1 (21.0) | −0.9 (30.4) | 5.0 (41.0) | 11.2 (52.2) | 16.7 (62.1) | 20.9 (69.6) | 21.1 (70.0) | 15.0 (59.0) | 7.0 (44.6) | 0.2 (32.4) | −6.3 (20.7) | 6.3 (43.3) |
| Record low °C (°F) | −26.5 (−15.7) | −22.8 (−9.0) | −12.1 (10.2) | −4.9 (23.2) | 2.0 (35.6) | 6.5 (43.7) | 12.9 (55.2) | 12.1 (53.8) | 2.9 (37.2) | −5.0 (23.0) | −15.6 (3.9) | −25.7 (−14.3) | −26.5 (−15.7) |
| Average precipitation mm (inches) | 19.2 (0.76) | 29.6 (1.17) | 42.9 (1.69) | 78.5 (3.09) | 93.2 (3.67) | 128.2 (5.05) | 364.3 (14.34) | 288.0 (11.34) | 153.1 (6.03) | 50.9 (2.00) | 45.1 (1.78) | 22.9 (0.90) | 1,315.9 (51.81) |
| Average precipitation days (≥ 0.1 mm) | 5.7 | 5.5 | 6.8 | 7.5 | 7.9 | 9.1 | 15.3 | 13.3 | 8.8 | 5.5 | 8.2 | 7.4 | 101 |
| Average relative humidity (%) | 63.3 | 59.4 | 56.8 | 55.2 | 60.8 | 66.7 | 77.1 | 76.8 | 74.3 | 70.8 | 67.9 | 66.3 | 66.3 |
| Mean monthly sunshine hours | 170.8 | 174.3 | 202.4 | 214.9 | 232.0 | 203.3 | 150.0 | 170.4 | 173.7 | 189.9 | 153.2 | 161.3 | 2,196.2 |
| Percentage possible sunshine | 54.0 | 55.3 | 51.8 | 53.4 | 50.5 | 42.5 | 31.5 | 37.9 | 44.4 | 54.0 | 49.9 | 52.9 | 47.5 |
Source: Korea Meteorological Administration (percent sunshine 1981–2010)

== City symbols ==
- City bird: Magpie
- City flower: Azaleas
- City tree: Pine

== Ceramic village ==
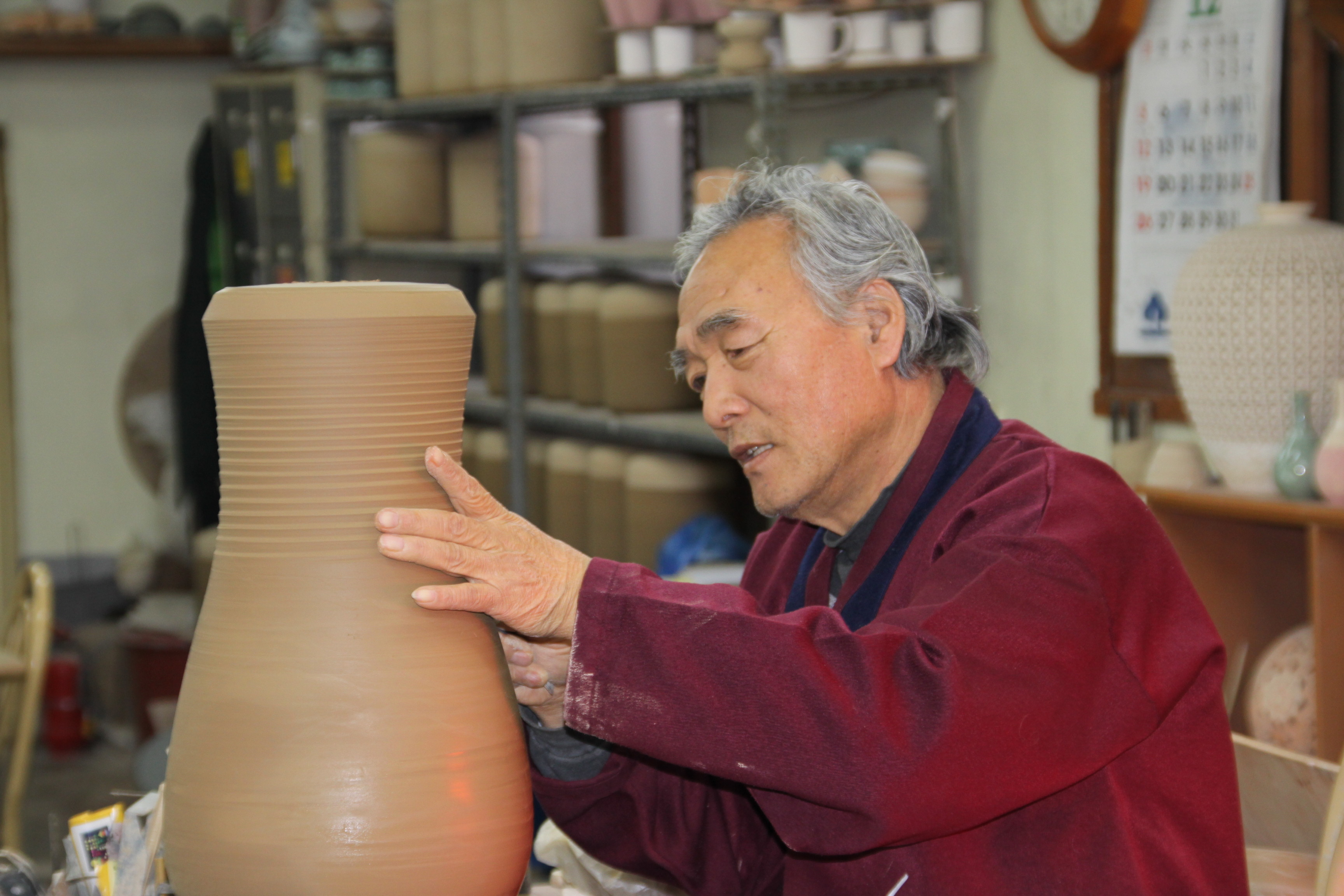
Master potter at work, Icheon.

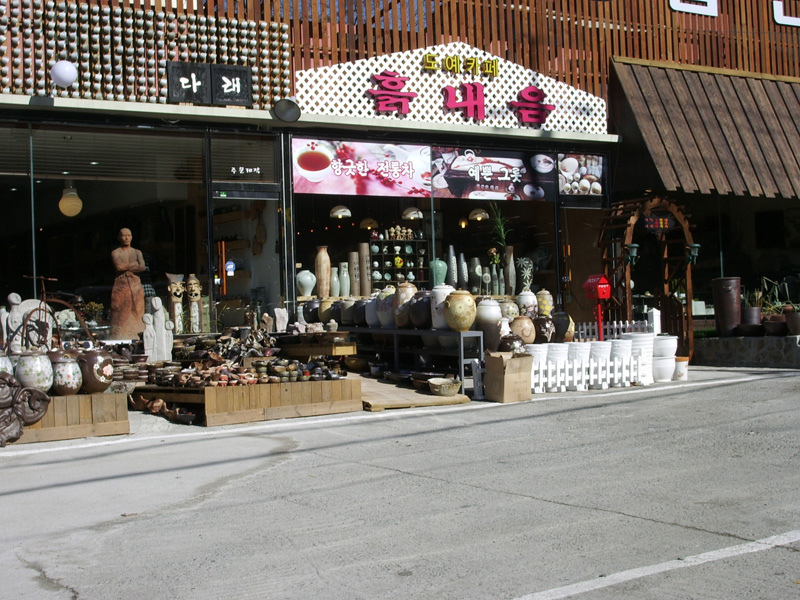
Ceramic shops, Icheon.

The Icheon Ceramics Village features 300-plus ceramics-making firms in the area of Sugwang-ri, Sindun-myeon, Saeum-dong, and a popular visitor attraction. They use traditional skills and produce porcelains in some 40 traditional firewood kilns. This pottery is recognized both at home and abroad for its quality.

The Saeum-dong and Sindun-myeon areas also include a ceramics village with many ceramics stores. Potters have researched traditional methods and revived the manufacture of ceramics in the style of Goryeo celadon and Joseon white porcelain here. The village is the center of the effort to preserve these traditions.

=== UNESCO ===
Icheon was designated as a UNESCO Creative City for Crafts and Folk Art, in 2010. In 2018, the city was elected as the first designated city for Craft and Folk Art among South Korea's creative cities. It served as the designated city until September 2021.

== Education ==
=== University ===
- Korea Tourism College
- Chungkang College of Cultural Industries

== Fires ==
Major building fires occurred on 7 January 2008 and on 29 April 2020.

== Twin towns – sister cities ==
Icheon is twinned with:

- Jingdezhen, China (1997)
- Kōka, Japan (2005)
- Santa Fe, United States (2013)
- Seto, Japan (2006)
- Wuxi, China (2005)
- Limoges, France (2015)
- Santa Clara, United States (2019)

== Notable people ==
- Sŏ Hŭi: The historic figure of Goryeo dynasty who made a huge decision with Khitan people who was forcefully occupying northern areas of Korean peninsula.
- Kang Mi-na: South Korean singer, rapper, dancer, actress and K-pop idol, former member of K-pop girlgroup Gugudan and its subunits Gugudan 5959 and Gugudan SeMiNa.
- Choi Jeong: Baseball player who played for SK Wyverns/SSG Landers and South Korea national baseball team
- Kim Se-yong: ceramist.
- Chun Woo-hee: South Korean actress.

== See also ==
- Korean pottery
- Geography of South Korea
- List of cities in South Korea
