= 1982 Korean Air Force C-123 crash =

Aviation incident in Jeju Island, South Korea

Coordinates: 33.3918°N 126.5370°E

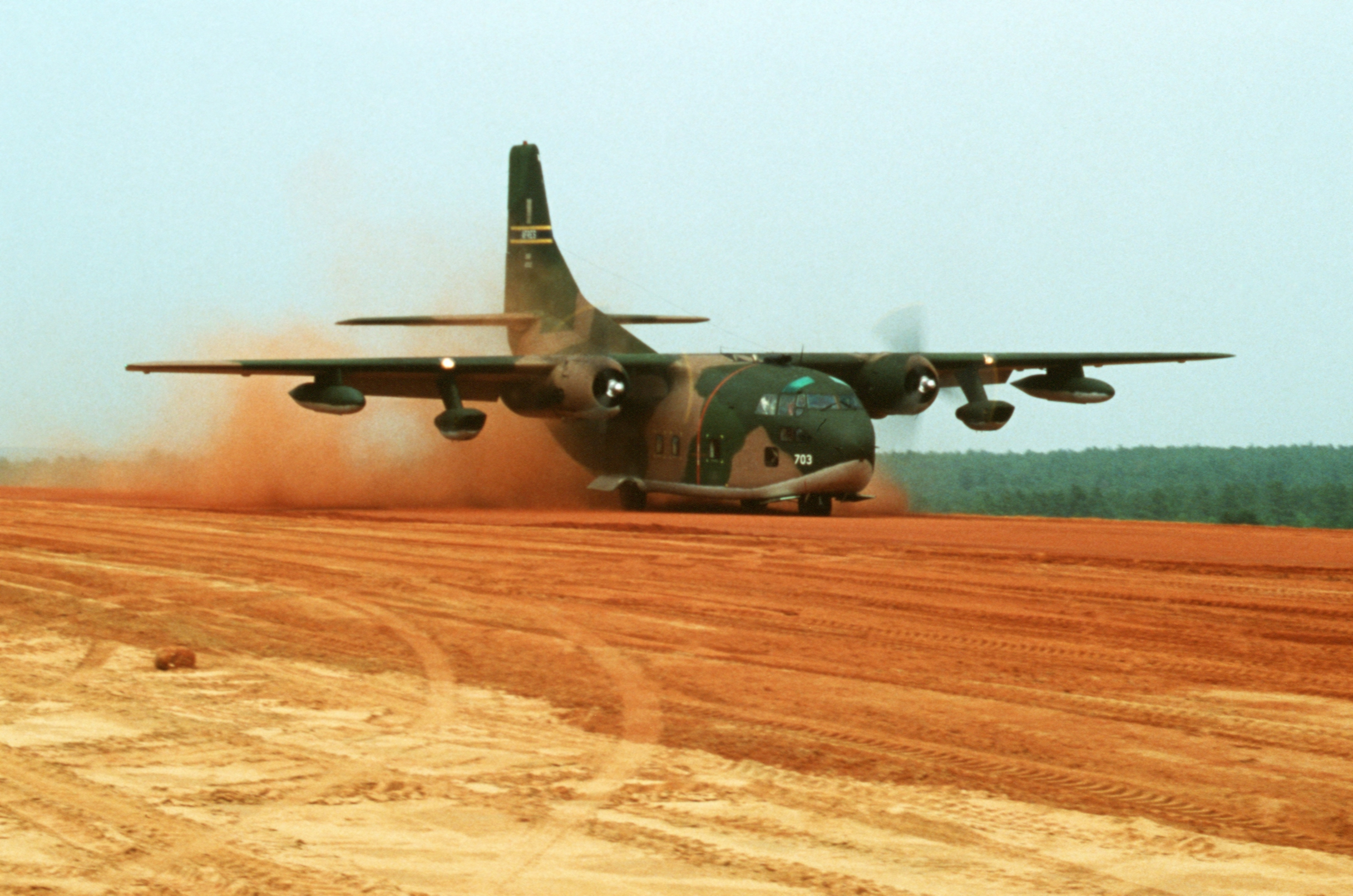
- A C-123 Provider similar to the accident aircraft

Accident
- Summary: Controlled flight into terrain due to bad weather
- Site

Aircraft
- Aircraft type: Fairchild C-123J
- Operator: Republic of Korea Air Force
- Destination: Jeju International Airport, Jeju, South Korea
- Passengers: 47
- Crew: 6
- Fatalities: 53
- Survivors: 0

On February 5, 1982, a Republic of Korea Air Force Fairchild C-123J crashed while on approach to Jeju International Airport, Jeju, South Korea. All 47 passengers and 6 crew were killed in the impact. It remains the fourth-worst accident in South Korean aviation history. The aircraft was engaged in a training mission and encountered bad weather before crashing near to Mount Halla, a dormant volcano.

The 47 soldiers belonged to the army's elite 707th Special Mission Battalion, making the accident the single costliest day in the unit's history.
