= 1995 Daegu gas explosions =

Accidental disaster in South Korea

- Date: April 28, 1995; 31 years ago
- Location: Daegu, South Korea
- Type: Gas explosion
- Deaths: 101
- Injuries: 202

The 1995 Daegu gas explosions (Korean: 대구 상인동 가스 폭발 사고; lit. 'Daegu Sangin-dong gas explosion incident') occurred at the Daegu Metro Line 1 construction site in Sangin-dong, Daegu, South Korea, on April 28, 1995. The explosion killed at least 101 people, including 42 Yeongnam Middle School students, and left as many as 202 people injured.

== Overview ==
At 7:52 a.m., an explosion occurred in the underground construction site of the 2nd Section of the Daegu Subway Line 2, located at Yeongnam High School in Sangin-dong, Dalseo District, Daegu. The explosion was caused by a gas leak that occurred when a gas pipeline was accidentally punctured during construction work at the Daegu branch of the Lotte Department Store in Buk District, Daegu. The gas leaked into the subway construction site through a nearby sewer, and an unknown source of fire triggered the explosion, which resulted in a 50-meter pillar of fire.

Negligence during the development of the Daegu Department Store was identified as the cause of the explosion. Prior to conducting underground excavation at a large construction site, it is essential to contact the company that buried the gas pipe and inquire about its location after obtaining permission from the relevant government office for road excavation. However, in this case, the gas pipe was not reported as damaged to the city gas department until 30 minutes after it was destroyed, resulting in further damage.

The explosion occurred during the school day, resulting in 101 deaths, including 42 students at Yeongnam Middle School, one teacher, and two police officers. In addition, 202 people were injured, and 152 vehicles and 60 houses were damaged, with a total damage cost of 54 billion won.

As a result of the incident, some broadcasting companies discontinued their regular broadcasts. KBS and YTN arranged special coverage or breaking news programming to cover the event.

A housewife initially claimed to have reported the smell of gas four hours before the explosion, but she later admitted to lying, stating that she wanted to be on TV. This claim caused controversy.

== Aftermath ==
The Ministry of Health, Labor, and Welfare established a special safety inspection team to implement safety measures such as early construction of a mapping system for underground materials, mandatory pre-consultation with a gas company before road excavation and occupancy, mandatory carrying of gas detectors to detect gas leaks, and more.

As a result of the incident, Daegu Department Store sold its newly constructed merchant store to Lotte Shopping in 1999. In February 2004, it reopened as a Lotte Department Store merchant store. The authorities were criticized for safety management administration, leading to an increase in the government and public's voice on improving the emergency rescue system and integrated structure system. A countermeasure mechanism was established, focusing on revising related laws such as the city gas business law.

Several individuals were recognized for their bravery during the incident, including Im Hae-nam, who saved passengers on bus number 121, Kim Ki-woong, who saved a bus driver, Son Jung-oh, who saved a person in a private taxi, and Seo Ji-hoon.

A monument in memory of the victims of the tragedy is located in Wolsung-dong, Haksan Park in Dalseo District, Daegu. The last official memorial service was held on the tenth anniversary, April 28, 2005. Approximately 500 people, including family members and citizens, attended the ceremony to pray for the victims' souls.
