= Chuja Islands =

Archipelago in South Korea

- Interactive map of Chuja Islands

Geography
- Coordinates: 33°56′50″N 126°19′13″E

Korean name
- Hangul: 추자군도
- Hanja: 楸子群島
- RR: Chuja gundo
- MR: Ch'uja kundo

Map labelling the individual islands that make up the Chuja Archipelago

The Chuja Islands (Korean: 추자군도) are a group of 42 islands in the Jeju Strait, about halfway between Jejudo and the southern coast of Jeollanamdo. Only four islands are inhabited: Sangchuja ("Upper Chuja"), which is connected by a bridge to Hachuja ("Lower Chuja"), the largest by area; Hoenggan; and Chupo. The Chuja Islands are administered by Jeju City. As of December 31, 2019, the population is 1,733, based on the number of citizen registrations.

== History ==
Chuja Islands are administered by Jeju City, but are geographically located adjacent to Wando-gun, South Jeolla Province, and the dialect and culture is similar to that of South Jeolla Province.

== Fishing Industry ==
Sinyang Fishing Port is a national fishing harbor located at Sinyang-1-ri, and is known for having a vast, arch-type, minimalist coast, and not the concrete that is common at other Korean ports. Jangjakpyeongsa beach is a popular destination.

== Transportation ==
Chuja Islands can be accessed by boat. There are two local buses between the islands.

== Climate ==
Climate data for Chuja Islands, Jeju City (1993–2020 normals)
Month	Jan	Feb	Mar	Apr	May	Jun	Jul	Aug	Sep	Oct	Nov	Dec	Year
Mean daily maximum °C (°F)	7.2 (45.0)	8.4 (47.1)	11.5 (52.7)	15.6 (60.1)	19.4 (66.9)	22.8 (73.0)	26.8 (80.2)	28.9 (84.0)	25.5 (77.9)	21.0 (69.8)	15.3 (59.5)	9.7 (49.5)	17.7 (63.9)
Daily mean °C (°F)	5.0 (41.0)	5.7 (42.3)	8.6 (47.5)	12.5 (54.5)	16.3 (61.3)	19.9 (67.8)	24.3 (75.7)	26.2 (79.2)	22.9 (73.2)	18.4 (65.1)	12.8 (55.0)	7.5 (45.5)	15.0 (59.0)
Mean daily minimum °C (°F)	2.8 (37.0)	3.3 (37.9)	6.0 (42.8)	10.0 (50.0)	13.9 (57.0)	17.8 (64.0)	22.2 (72.0)	24.2 (75.6)	21.1 (70.0)	16.4 (61.5)	10.6 (51.1)	5.1 (41.2)	12.8 (55.0)
Average precipitation mm (inches)	27.2 (1.07)	40.3 (1.59)	73.0 (2.87)	79.6 (3.13)	92.5 (3.64)	152.7 (6.01)	190.3 (7.49)	201.8 (7.94)	132.9 (5.23)	57.9 (2.28)	46.6 (1.83)	32.9 (1.30)	1,127.7 (44.40)
Average precipitation days (≥ 0.1 mm)	5.9	5.5	7.0	7.7	7.8	8.8	9.1	8.5	6.9	4.6	5.9	7.4	85.1
Source: Korea Meteorological Administration
