= Daeyeonggak Hotel fire =

1971 fire in Seoul, South Korea

Coordinates: 37°33′39″N 126°58′58″E

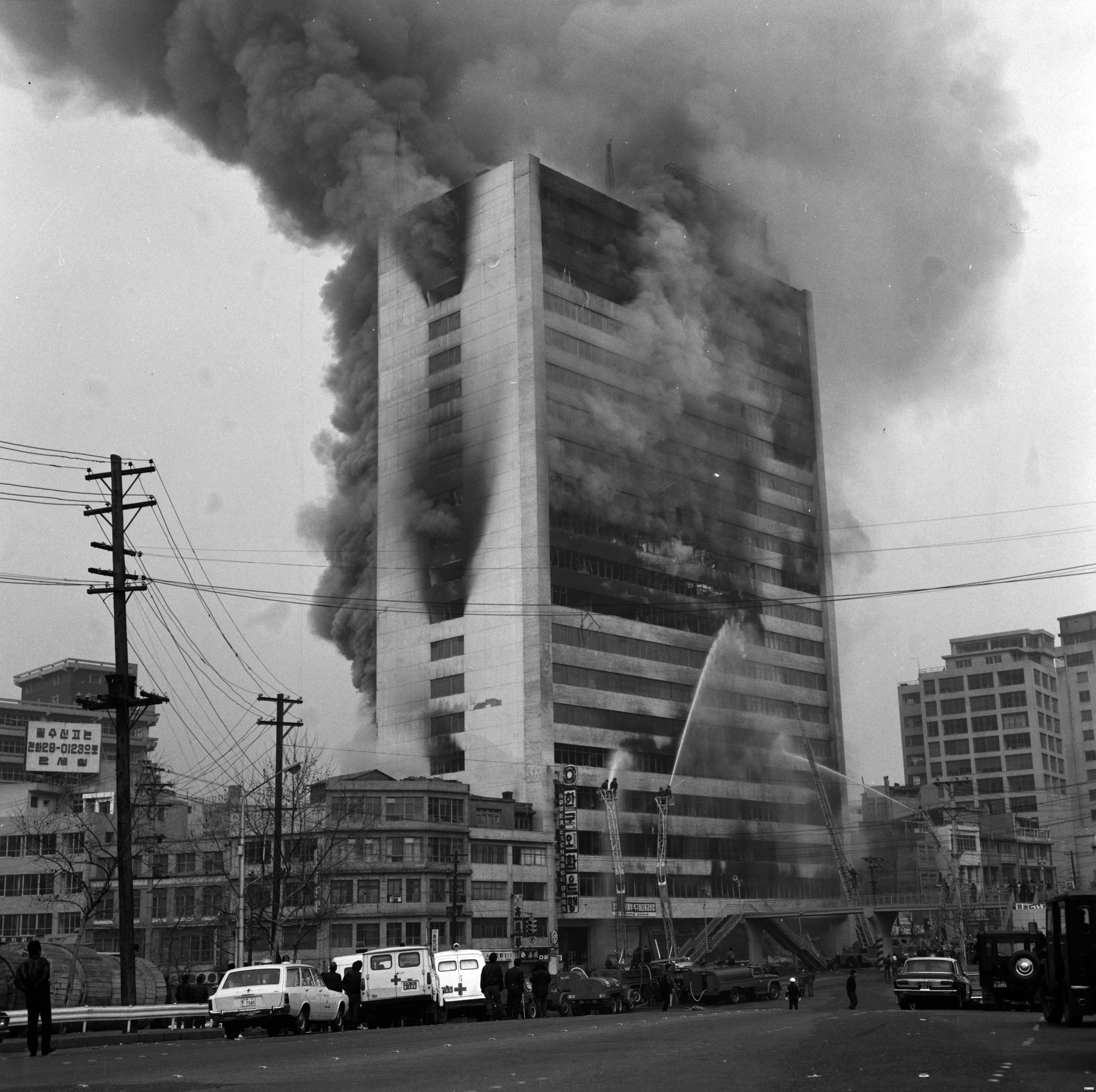
- Date: 25 December 1971; 54 years ago
- Time: 9:50 am
- Location: Chungmuro, Jung District, Seoul, South Korea
- Cause: Gas explosion
- Deaths: 164
- Injuries: 63

The Daeyeonggak Hotel fire was a skyscraper fire in Seoul, South Korea, on 25 December 1971, which killed 164 people and injured 63. It remains the deadliest hotel fire in history.

== Background ==
The 22-storey Daeyeonggak Hotel (also called Hotel Taeyongak) was a luxury hotel completed in 1969. It had 222 rooms. A total of 187 guests and about 130 workers were presumed to have been in the hotel prior to the fire. Of the registered guests, 47 were listed as foreigners.

The design of the building was said to have played a part in the high death toll. The two internal stairwells were designed for use in case of lift failures and not as fire exits, and lacked fireproof doors. Consequently the stairwells filled with smoke during the fire, acting as chimneys, and spread the fire to upper floors of the building. The building had no external emergency staircase. The walls between the hotel rooms were not sufficiently fire resistant, hastening the spread of the blaze. The tower lacked many other safety features, including battery-operated exit lights.

== Fire ==
The fire was reportedly due to an explosion of propane gas that had been used as cooking fuel in a coffee shop, located on the second floor. The fire burned for ten hours. Many were unable to find the exit in the darkness. The fire department's ladders only reached the eighth floor, trapping those from the ninth to the 22nd storeys. Only eight people were reported as being rescued from windows.

Twelve helicopters, including some from the United States military bases, were mobilised to try to rescue guests from the roof using aerial slings.

== Victims ==
At least 38 people died leaping from windows to escape the inferno, some clinging to mattresses in an attempt to survive the fall. At least one man fell to his death from a helicopter. Sixty-nine people were reported as injured with many of them listed in serious condition.

The 162nd death was that of Yu Sien-yung, the minister of the Taiwanese embassy in Seoul, who lived alone in the hotel. He was trapped in the burning building for more than 10 hours and died in hospital, aged 64, on 4 January 1972.

== Legal ==
Authorities arrested eight people in connection with the disaster. These included Kim Yong-san and four other hotel officials, who were charged with carelessness and improper construction, as well as two former city officials and a fire officer on charges of negligence.

== Aftermath ==
Two senior fire services officers of the Hong Kong Government flew to Seoul on 11 January 1972 to confer with the South Koreans on fire prevention. President Park Chung Hee mentioned the fire in a New Years press conference on 11 January 1972 where he claimed that careless fire management of the building and of the building material were to blame.

The building was remodeled after the fire. There was another fire there on 27 February 2010.

== See also ==
- 2010 Shanghai fire
