= Seongsu Bridge disaster =

1994 bridge collapse in Seoul, South Korea

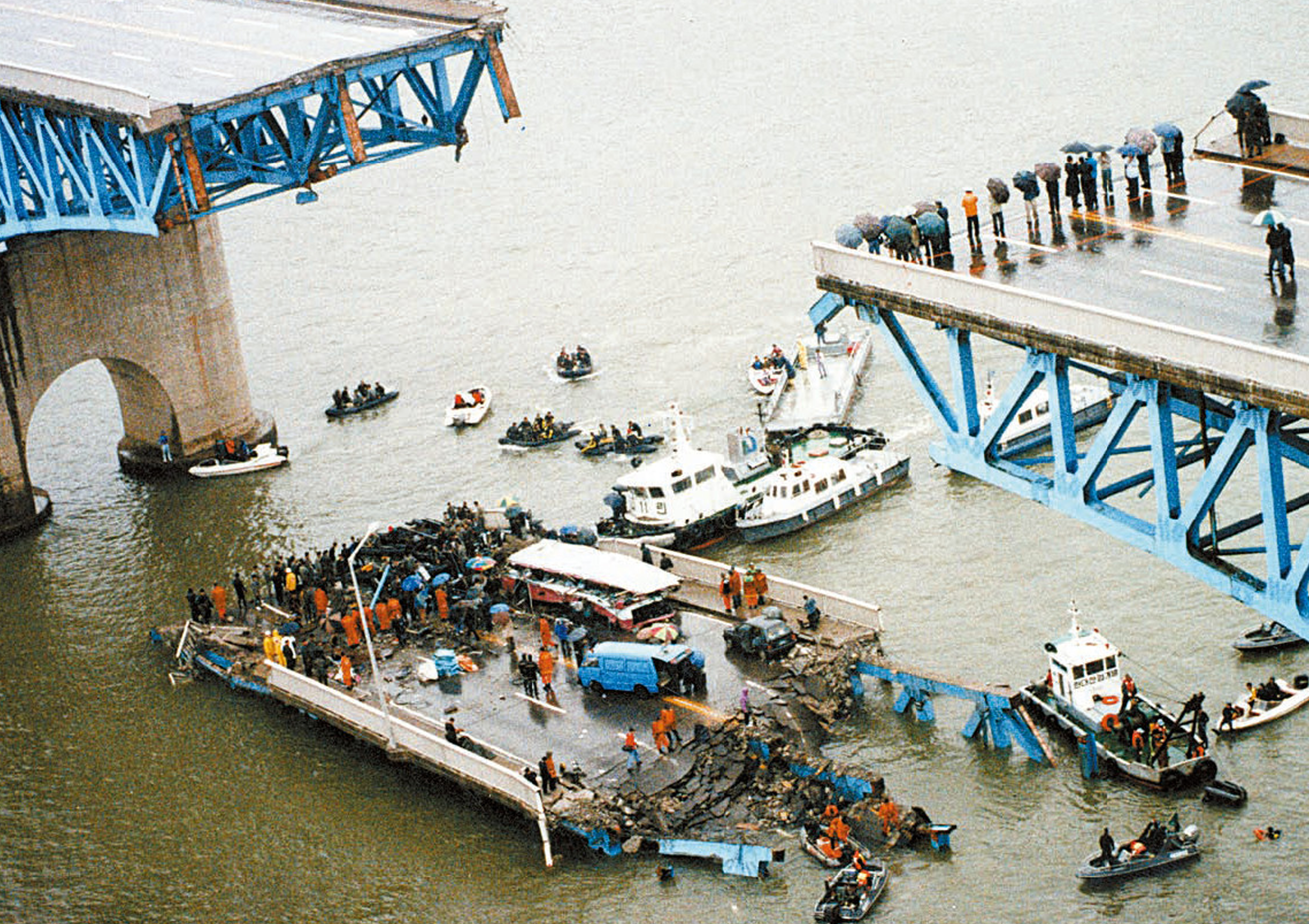
- Site of the Seongsu Bridge disaster
- Date: October 21, 1994
- Time: 7:38 a.m. KST
- Location: Seoul, South Korea; 37°32′14″N 127°02′06″E
- Cause: Structural failure caused by faulty welding and rusted extension hinges; exacerbated by insufficient maintenance and failure to prevent the propagation of fatigue cracks
- Deaths: 32
- Injuries: 17
- Convicted: 17 convicted, including: Four Seoul Metropolitan Government officials; Seven Dongbu Corporation officials; Six Dong Ah Construction Industrial Company officials
- Charges: Criminal negligence resulting in death, injury, general obstruction of traffic, and automobile accident; Forgery and use of forged public documents; Forgery and use of forged private documents
- Verdict: Guilty
- Sentence: Sentences ranging from 6 months to 3 years imprisonment

The Seongsu Bridge disaster (Korean: 성수대교 붕괴 사고) was a deadly bridge collapse that occurred on the morning of October 21, 1994 in Seoul, South Korea. A section of the upper truss of the Seongsu Bridge collapsed onto the Han River, killing 32 people and injuring another 17. A combination of faulty welding, rusted extension hinges, and insufficient maintenance resulted in the structural failure of the bridge.

The Seongsu Bridge opened in 1979 and was the 11th bridge constructed over the Han River, connecting the northern Seongdong District to the southern Gangnam District. The bridge became one of the busiest bridges in Seoul and was built as part of military dictator Park Chung Hee's plan to develop the region south of the Han River (known as Hangang).

Seventeen Seoul Metropolitan Government, Dongbu Corporation, and Dong Ah Construction officials were convicted in connection to the collapse. The Mayor of Seoul Lee Won-jong and his successor Woo Myoung-kyu both resigned in response to the disaster. On November 10, 2000, the Dong Ah Group, the parent company of Dong Ah Construction, filed for bankruptcy and the company dissolved on May 11, 2001. The collapse was part of a string of disasters during the modernization of South Korea, including a fire on board the Kukdong-ho sightseeing boat in 1987; the Gupo Station rail accident, the crash of Asiana Airlines Flight 733 and the sinking of MV Seohae, all in 1993; and the Daegu gas explosions and Sampoong Department Store collapse in 1995.

== Background ==
Construction for the Seongsu Bridge began on April 9, 1977, and was completed on October 15, 1979, by the Dong Ah Construction Industrial Company at a cost of 11.58 billion won (equivalent to ₩83 billion in 2025). At the time, foreign firms were excluded from construction contracts, stretching thin domestic construction companies who faced increasing demand as a result of military dictator Park Chung Hee's development plan south of the Han River. The cantilever bridge had four lanes of traffic, a width of 19.4 metres (64 feet), and spanned 1,160 m (3,810 ft). The speed limit on the bridge was 60 km/h (37 mph). The bridge was praised for its focus on its aesthetics in addition to functional considerations, setting it apart from other bridges built at the time. The bridge became the 11th bridge constructed over the Han River and alleviated traffic on the nearby Yeongdong and Hannam bridges.

Two years earlier, the Second Haengju Bridge collapsed during construction with no casualties. Later that year, the Changseon Bridge (창선대교; 昌善大橋) in Namhae, South Gyeongsang Province, collapsed under similar circumstances as the Seongsu Bridge. At the time, bids for construction projects frequently went to companies that promised the fastest construction, incentivizing cheap and rushed construction at the expense of safety. Dong Ah Construction's bid for the Seongsu Bridge's construction contract was half the price of its expected cost at the time. The rushed construction of the bridge was attributed as a negative consequence of South Korea's ppalli ppalli (빨리빨리; lit. 'quickly, quickly') culture.

The Seongsu Bridge linked the Seongdong District north of the river to the southern Gangnam District and was one of the busiest bridges in Seoul. Following the development of the Gangnam region, the number of vehicles using the bridge increased exponentially to 160,000 vehicles per day. The bridge connected to the Seoul Olympic Highway to the south. During the 15 years from its construction to its collapse, the Seongsu Bridge had never been subject to a detailed inspection because it was less than 20 years old and inspections had focused solely on aging structures.

== Collapse ==
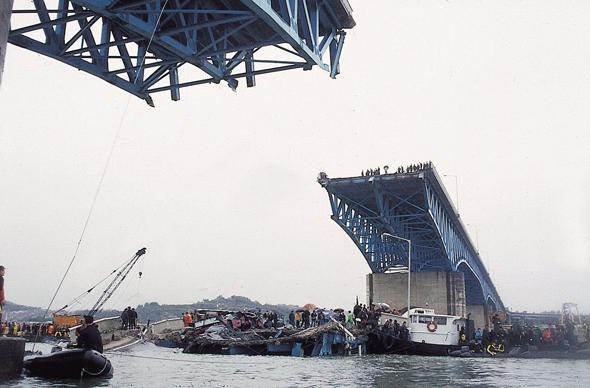
The bridge after the collapse

On October 20, 1994, at 9:30 p.m. KST the evening before the collapse, workers for the Seoul Metropolitan Government laid a small steel plate onto a seam on the bridge, 50 m (160 ft) away from the site of the eventual collapse, to cover up a large gap that had formed at the joint. Repairs for the bridge had been scheduled for that day but were postponed due to bad weather.

On Friday, October 21, at 6:00 a.m., drivers filed a report after seeing cracks in the bridge, but the city government dismissed the reports, saying that the crack had been repaired through the installation of the steel plate.

At 7:38 a.m., during the beginning of the morning rush hour, a 48-metre (157-foot) span on the north side of the Seongsu Bridge suddenly gave way into the Han River 20 m (66 ft) below. Survivors of the collapse compared the sound of the collapse to thunder. Traffic was flowing at a speed of 40 kilometers per hour (25 mph), and a total of six vehicles were involved in the incident, including a police van and a commuter bus carrying 31 occupants. The police van carried 11 police and auxiliary police officers who were selected as model officers for Police Day celebrations that day. Heavy rain the night before the collapse reportedly reduced the number of vehicles on the road at the time. The collapse sent two cars and the police van down with the bridge, while an additional two cars fell into the river. The Number 16 bus operated by the Hansung Transportation Company was traveling North from Seoul Grand Park to Beon-dong and had nearly crossed the span when the bridge collapsed. The collapse caused the rear of the bus to tilt over backwards and plummet onto its roof, crumpling to half its size.

=== Victims ===
Thirty-two people were killed in the disaster (Note: The dead included eight students from Muhak Girls' High School (Cho Su-yeon (조수연), Hwang Seon-jeong (황선정), Bae Ji-hyeon (배지현), Paek Mi-jeong (백미정), Choi Yang-hui (최양희), Jang Se-mi (장세미), Lee Ji-hyeon (이지현), and Lee Yeon-su (이연수)), Muhak Girls' Middle School student Lee So-yun (이소윤), bus driver Yu Seong-yeol (유성열), Seoul Police officer Lee Jeong-su (이정수), Seoul National University of Education student Lee Seung-yeong (이승영), Hanyang Girls' Middle School teacher Jang Yeong-o (장영오), two teachers at Anam Elementary School (Choi Jeong-hwan (최정환) and Yoon Hyeon-ja (윤현자)), Philippine national Adele Aida (아델아이다), as well as Seong Bong-sik (성봉식), Kim Gwang-su (김광수), Kim Joong-sik (김중식), Paek Jeong-hwa (백정화), Moon Ok-yeon (문옥연), Kim Won-seok (김원석), Yoo Jin-hwi (유진휘), Kim Dong-ik (김동익), Song Geun-jong (송근종), Ji Soo-yeong (지수영), Yoo Sang-hae (유상해), Kim Yong-nam (김용남), Kim Jeong-jin (김정진), Lee Deok-yeong (이덕영), Lee Hong-gyun (이홍균), and Lee Gi-pung (이기풍).) including 29 victims on the Number 16 bus, which held 31 people when it fell. Among the dead were the bus driver and nine students from the Muhak Girls' High School and the Muhak Girls' Middle School in the Haengdang neighborhood of Seongdong District. Two of the victims on the bus survived the fall, but died waiting for first responders. The victims were treated at six hospitals, including the National Police Hospital, while the 32 dead were enshrined at 15 hospitals throughout Seoul. (Note: The dead were enshrined at the Gangnam City Hospital (강남시립병원), the Gangdong Catholic Hospital (강동 카톨릭병원), the Bangjigeo Hospital (방지거병원), the Halla Hospital (한라병원), the Hanyang University Hospital, the Soonchunhyang Hospital (순천향병원), the Central Hospital, the Dong-Ah Hospital (동아병원), the Yongsan Company Hospital (중대 부속 용산병원), the Hyemin Hospital, the Kangdong Sacred Heart Hospital, the Gangnam St. Mary's Hospital, and the People's Hospital (민중병원).) Among the victims was Adele Aida, a 40-year-old undocumented immigrant from the Philippines who was traveling to a meeting of Filipinos in Korea. Initial reports incorrectly reported over 40 deaths after police reports mistakenly combined the list of the dead and the injured.

=== Rescue ===
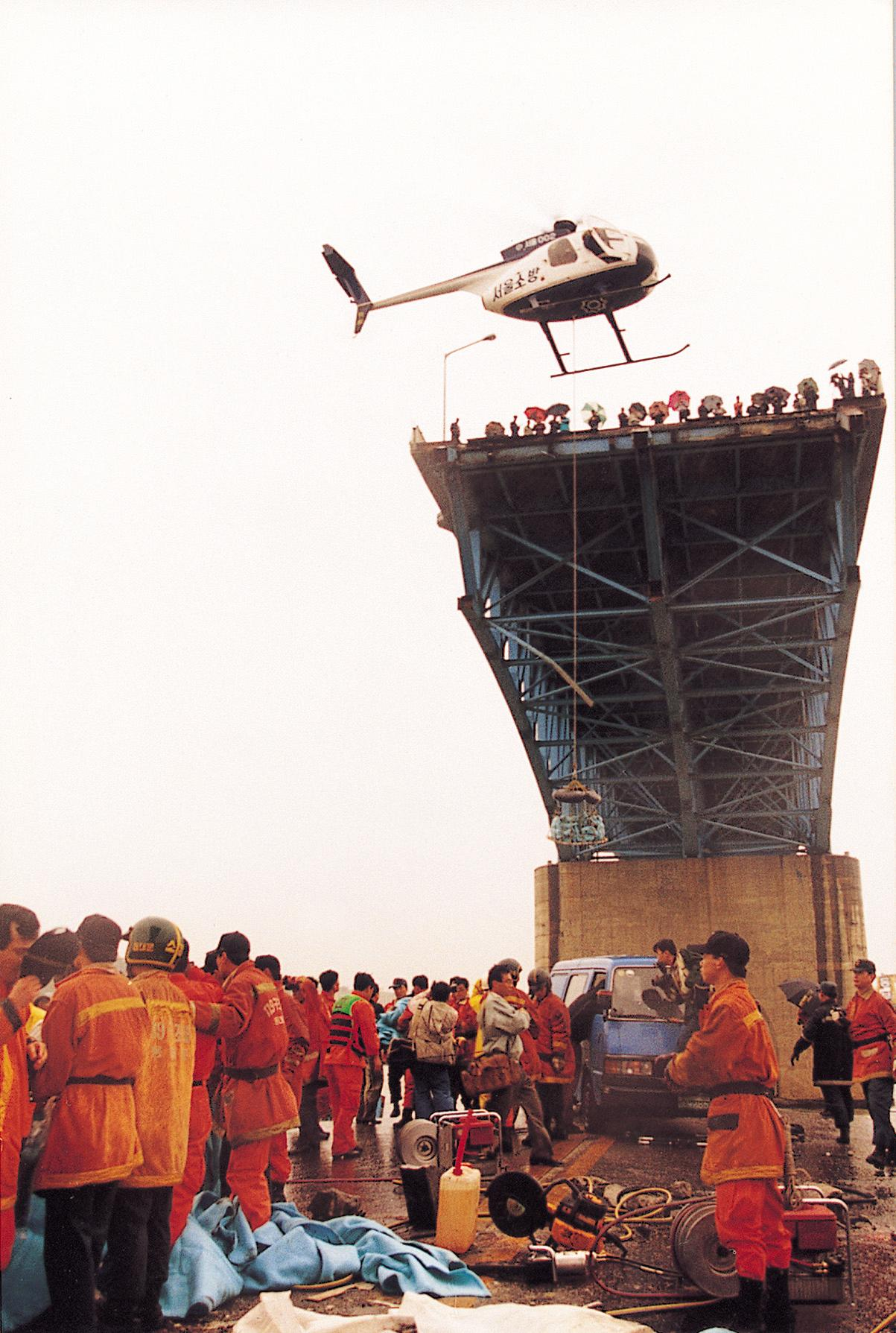
Rescue operations

The 11 police and auxiliary officers in the police van that fell with the bridge became the first to respond to the disaster. The officers undressed and used their clothes to tie a rope, saving a total of 10 drowning people. First responders arrived more than 20 minutes after the collapse, and rescue operations began at 8:10 a.m. KST. The late response of the first responders drew public ire and was the result of call center employees mistaking emergency calls for prank calls. These rescue operations were carried out by 30 officers and members of the Seoul Metropolitan Police and the Han River Patrol (한강순찰대) and consisted of two helicopters, three barges and 10 yawls. At 9:40 a.m., 20 divers from the Sea Salvage & Rescue Unit of the Korean Navy arrived at the scene to recover bodies from the river.

In response to the collapse, a total of 1,500 people were mobilized from the Seoul Metropolitan Police Agency, the Korean Armed Forces, and the Seoul Metropolitan Fire Service. The rescue team included 150 underwater exploration special forces from the fire service. Rescue efforts were hampered by rain, tides, and heavy traffic.

=== Initial reaction ===
Officials initially stated that they believed the collapse occurred as a result of long-term excessive load on the bridge, culminating in the fracture of a rusted connection hinge. Vehicles carrying loads greater than their maximum capacity were regularly passing through the bridge. This led to a crackdown on overloaded vehicles over the Hangang Bridge out of fear of a similar collapse. A KBS News investigation the following day found that the Seongsu Bridge, along with the Dongho Bridge and the Hangang Bridge, suffered from rushed construction. In their report, KBS News noted that severely rusted steel on the bridges had been painted over, bolts were missing from the bridges, and segments of the bridges were only welded on the outside. Following the collapse, it was also revealed that the Seoul Metropolitan Government had planned to expand the bridge from four to five lanes through a reversible lane.

== Investigations ==
On July 13, 1995, the Seoul District Prosecutor's Office published the 471-page White Paper on the Activities of the Seongsu Bridge Collapse Incident Investigation Team, analyzing the causes of the bridge collapse. The white paper concludes that the direct cause of the collapse was the poor welding of the vertical members of the bridge, which connected the suspension trusses to the anchor trusses. It notes that had the vertical members been welded correctly, increases in load would not have caused the fatigue stress to exceed reasonable limits and that fatigue failure would not have occurred. Radiographic testing carried out following the collapse found that 110 out of the 111 connections in the bridge were filled with defects and that welds often only penetrated 2 to 8mm when the beams were 18mm thick.

The white paper further notes that had the Seoul Metropolitan Government and the Dongbu Corporation properly inspected the bridge and carried out basic repairs, the collapse would have been unlikely to occur. The report concluded that as a result of the poor construction and maintenance of the bridge, in the worst-case scenario, the collapse of the bridge could have occurred within three years of construction. The white paper found no flaws in the design of the bridge itself.

In addition, the frequent use of inexperienced subcontractors, the lack of a system to monitor discrepancies in design and construction, the management of construction by non-technical officials, and rampant corruption were all listed as exacerbating factors in the collapse. Maintenance of the bridge was neglected due to limited fiscal resources, and connecting pins used in the bridge had become heavily rusted. At the time, due to the lack of domestic technical skills in steel plate welding, Dong Ah Construction hired a Zainichi Korean to manage the Bupyeo steel factory (부평공장). However, when his insistence on inspecting the welds led to delays, he was fired.

The original white paper was criticized for publishing the names, genders, resident registration numbers, addresses, and occupations of the victims, omitting only the personal information of the minors and eleven police officers. In addition, the exact compensation received by each of the deceased victims' families was released in the original white paper.

== Legal proceedings ==
97 Criminal Appeal Trial No. 1740
- Court: Supreme Court of Korea
- Decided: November 28, 1997
- Citation: Supreme Court Decisions Official Report (판례공보) 1998.1.1. (Vol. 49), page 184

Case history
- Prior action: Appealed from Seoul Central District Court Sentenced 1997.6.11., 95 Criminal Appeal Trial No. 2918 Original Judgement Seoul District Court [Sentenced 1995.4.20., 94 Criminal Individual First Trial No. 8478, 8479, 8480, 8481, 8482 (Collective)]

Case opinions
- All appeals dismissed unanimously. Five defendants found guilty as joint principals of criminal negligence causing death, injury, general obstruction of traffic, and automobile accident.

97 Criminal Appeal Trial No. 1741
- Court: Supreme Court of Korea
- Decided: November 28, 1997
- Citation: Supreme Court Decisions Official Report (판례공보) 1998.1.1. (Vol. 49), page 191

Case history
- Prior actions: Appealed from Seoul Central District Court Sentenced 1997.6.11. 1995 Criminal Prosecution Case Number 3004 Original judgement Seoul District Court Sentenced 1995.4.20., 94 Criminal Individual First Trial No. 8274, 8280 (Collective)

Case opinions
- All appeals dismissed unanimously. Of eleven defendants: ten found guilty of criminal negligence; eight found guilty of forgery of public documents and use of forged public documents; three found guilty of forgery of private documents and use of forged private documents.

Immediately following the collapse, prosecutors launched a criminal investigation into Dong Ah Construction. Four days later, prosecutors found damage reports submitted in February and April to the Seoul Metropolitan Government by the Dongbu Corporation, which was responsible for bridge maintenance and repair. These reports stated the steel girders supporting the Seongsu Bridge were in urgent need of repair and included photographs of the damage on the bridge. On October 26, prosecutors arrested the head of the city government's construction office and six other Seoul City officials for falsely reporting that the bridge was safe without performing the required daily checks. In the end, the Seoul District Prosecutor's Office's investigation would lead to 17 arrests in connection to the collapse: four Seoul Metropolitan Government officials, seven Dongbu Corporation officials, and six Dong Ah Construction officials. Prosecutors decided against arresting former mayor of Seoul Lee Won-jong, stating that they did not find evidence that he was ever informed of the imminent collapse.

The 17 defendants were tried collectively at the 7th Seoul Criminal District Court under Judge Kim Dong-hwan (김동환), and proceedings began on December 15, 1994. Defendants from Dong Ah Construction were charged with criminal negligence resulting in death, injury, the obstruction of traffic, and an automobile accident. Defendants from the Seoul Metropolitan Government and the Dongbu Corporation were additionally charged with forgery of public documents, use of forged public documents, forgery of private documents, and use of forged private documents. Defendants from Dong Ah Construction argued that the five-year statute of limitations for negligent manslaughter had passed because the bridge had been built 15 years ago. However, the judge ruled that the statute of limitations for criminal negligence began on the date of the crash and not the date of construction, a decision appellate courts would later uphold. The officials testified that they were not aware of any poor construction. On April 20, 1995, the district court convicted 16 defendants while acquitting construction site manager Shin Dong-hyun (신동현; 申東賢), ruling that Shin was not in a position to be aware of any defects in the welding of the bridge. Sentences varied from ten months to three years imprisonment, but were suspended by the judge who argued that the defendants had already served six months and should not be punished further for poor construction that had been carried out 15 years ago. Seoul District Prosecutors appealed the decisions, and the case was taken to the Seoul Central District Court.

The criminal appeal was held under Judge Han Jung-duk (한정덕; 韓正悳). On June 11, 1997, the appeals court reversed the lower court's ruling, convicting Shin Dong-hyun and sentencing him to two years imprisonment. Former production manager of Bupyeo Steel factory Park Hyo-su (박효수; 朴孝洙) was sentenced to two years imprisonment, having previously been serving a suspended sentence of five years' probation from three years imprisonment. Yeo Yong-won (여용원; 呂勇元), the former director of the Dongbu Construction office in Seoul, was sentenced to one year six months imprisonment, having previously been serving a suspended sentence of four years' probation from two years imprisonment. Sentences for all other defendants were reversed to their original lengths of ten months to three years imprisonment, two to five years' probation, and fines of 5 million won each (equivalent to ₩10 million in 2025). In December 1995, between the decision of the first court and the appeals court, an amendment to the law reduced the punishment for forging public documents to a fine. In particular, the former head of the city's road construction office Lee Shin-young (이신영; 李臣永) was the only defendant not convicted with negligent manslaughter. Thus, in June 1997, Lee's sentence was reduced from two years' probation, suspended from one year imprisonment, to a fine of 5 million won.

The former head of the city's road maintenance office Kim Jae-seok (김재석) was sentenced to one year and six months imprisonment and three years probation. Construction supervisors for the city of Seoul Kim Seok-gi (김석기) and Lee Woo-yeon (이우연) were sentenced to one year and six months imprisonment and three years' probation while Lee was sentenced to one year imprisonment and two years' probation. Former Vice President Kim Myeong-nyeon (김명년) and public affairs manager Jang Rae-ik (장래익) of Dong Ah Construction were both sentenced to two years imprisonment and five years' probation. Technical director of Bupyeo steel factory Lee Kyu-dae (이규대) was sentenced to three years imprisonment and five years' probation.

The defendants appealed the ruling, and the case was taken to the Korean Supreme Court. In South Korea, the Supreme Court can only consider appeals with regards to the law and cannot alter sentencing. Defendants argued that they were not individually responsible for the bridge collapse because no individual action had caused the bridge to collapse. Between the appeals court ruling and the Supreme Court ruling, one defendant died. On November 28, 1997, the Supreme Court upheld the convictions of all 16 defendants and accepted the lower court's ruling that the Dong Ah Construction Industrial Company was guilty of criminal negligence in its poor construction of the bridge.

== Aftermath ==
An estimated 5,000 vehicles had to be redirected onto arterial roads, causing traffic congestion lasting until 11 p.m. that night. Following the disaster, Prime Minister Lee Yung-dug offered his resignation, but President Kim Young-sam declined, stating that changing safety measures was more important than changing people. In contrast, the resignation offer of Lee Won-jong, the Mayor of Seoul, was accepted at 7 p.m. that day. He would be replaced by Governor of North Gyeongsang Province Woo Myoung-kyu on October 31 before being replaced again by Choi Byung-ryeol 11 days later, when it was revealed that Woo had been Deputy Mayor when internal reports had questioned the safety of the bridge.

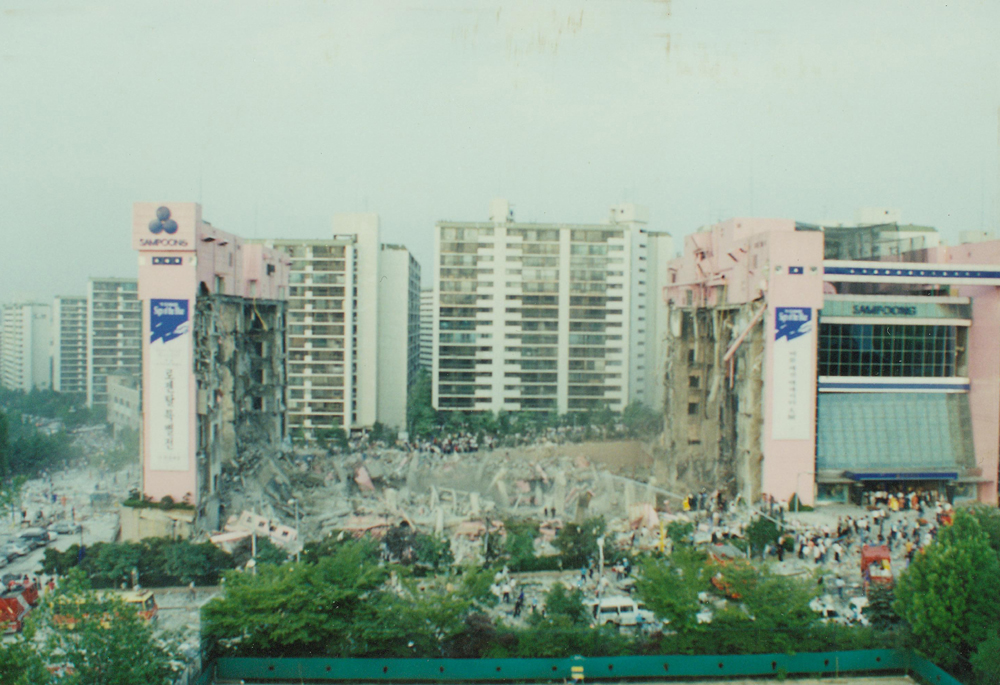
The Sampoong Department Store collapse nine months later would kill 502 people and injure 937 more

Kim held a meeting with his cabinet on October 23 calling for the elimination of deficient companies from the construction industry and the revision of laws to increase the depth and breadth of inspections. The next day, Kim appeared on national television in his second official apology of his term. In his address, he stated that the rapid development of South Korea since the 1960s had brought both positive and negative outcomes, and that his government would promise to minimize all risks to Koreans. He then apologized, stating that the disaster was the result of his own lack of virtue and that he recognized the issues in the management system brought to light by the collapse. Nevertheless, the Sampoong Department Store collapsed nine months later, becoming the deadliest peacetime disaster in South Korean history. The recurrence of major disasters during the Kim Young-sam administration gave his government the popular nickname "Disaster Republic". In response to the bridge disaster, opposition parties in the National Assembly called on members of Kim's cabinet to resign, raising motions of no confidence which were voted down.

The Seoul Citizen's Day celebrations set for the week after the bridge collapse were postponed. On November 30 of that year, newspaper clippings documenting the disaster were included in the Seoul Millennium Time Capsule which marked the 600th anniversary of the capital city of Seoul.

On November 10, 2000, the Dong Ah Group, the parent company of Dong Ah Construction, filed for bankruptcy and dissolved six months later, on May 11, 2001.

=== Compensation ===
The Cabinet paid 4 million won (equivalent to ₩9 million in 2025) in compensation to each of the families of the 32 people who died in the incident. In addition, the Cabinet paid for the medical expenses of the injured and compensated them in consultation with their families, with the exception of the police officers. The Temporary Workers Friendly Association of Korea (비근로자 한·비친선협) and the Lotte Welfare Foundation also provided compensation to the family of Adele Aida through the Philippine embassy. Many of those who survived the disaster have been reported to have had permanent psychological trauma from the incident.

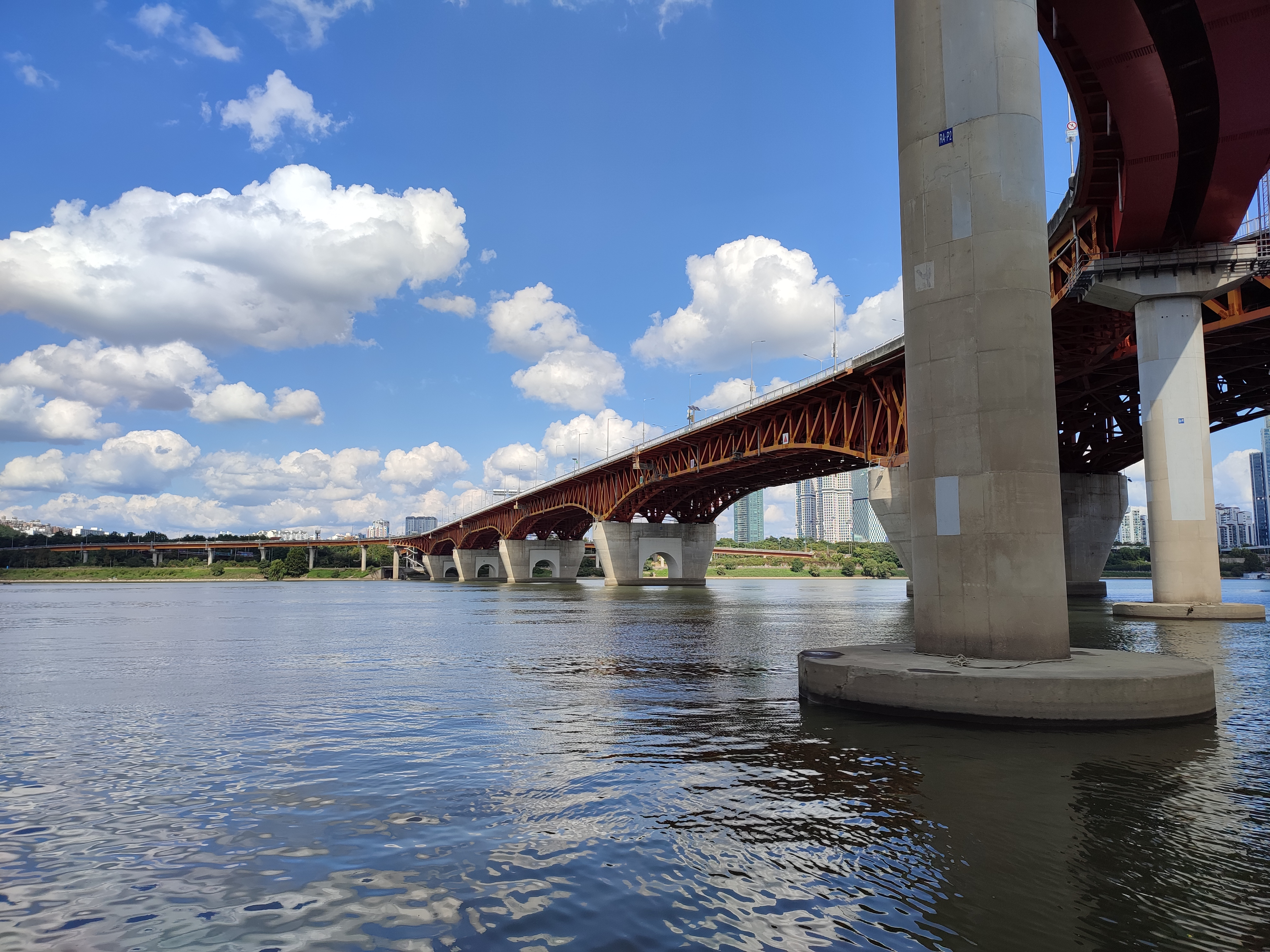
The new Seongsu Bridge, built at the same location

=== Impact ===
The collapse prompted the Seoul Metropolitan Government to begin a more thorough safety assessment of the 14 other bridges that crossed the Han River and into whether the Seongsu Bridge could be safely fixed. As a result of these investigations, the Dangsan Railway Bridge was closed for reconstruction on December 31, 1996, being re-opened to the public on November 22, 1999.

On January 5, 1995, in response to the disaster, the Special Act on the Safety Management of Structures was passed, which expanded the frequency and scope of inspections. In July of that year, the Disaster Control Act would be passed, a response to the deadly collapses of the Seongsu Bridge and the Sampoong Department Store.

Although the city government initially planned to repair and reopen the Seongsu Bridge to traffic within three months, this plan was reversed following public outcry. Starting on April 26, 1995, the remainder of the bridge was dismantled, and construction for the new bridge began in March 1996 under Hyundai Engineering & Construction. Construction for the replacement bridge would cost 78 billion won (equivalent to ₩160 billion in 2025), about 6.8 times the original price. The new bridge was opened to the public on July 3, 1997, by Mayor Cho Soon, and a memorial was held on the bridge.

=== Memorial ===
The Memorial Stone for the Victims of the Seongsu Bridge Disaster (Korean: 성수대교 사고 희생자 위령비) was erected on October 21, 1997, by the families of the Seongsu Bridge disaster victims. The memorial commemorates the victims of the disaster and aims to raise awareness on the safe management of public infrastructure. The memorial is located in the middle of Gangbyeon Expressway on the north side of the bridge, and has been criticized for its inaccessibility by foot. In August 1999, a father of a Muhak Girls' High School student who died in the Seongsu Bridge disaster died by suicide in front of the memorial. Memorials are held at the stone every year, and a 20th anniversary memorial service was held at the stone in 2014.

== In popular culture ==
- DJ DOC's second studio album Murphy's Law (1995) contains the tracks "Breaking News" and "Seongsu Bridge" which were made in response to the disaster.
- The rock band N.EX.T.'s third album, The Return of N.EX.T Part 2: World (1995), mentions the Seongsu Bridge collapse in its criticism of South Korea's development.
- The Seongsu Bridge disaster was the subject of Jeong Yoon-cheol's 1997 debut short film Memorial Photographing (Korean: 기념 촬영).
- The manhwa series Yahoo (1998–2003) by Yoon Tae-ho was based on the collapse of the Seongsu Bridge.
- The 2018 film House of Hummingbird revolves around the Seongsu Bridge disaster as a major plot point.

== Gallery ==
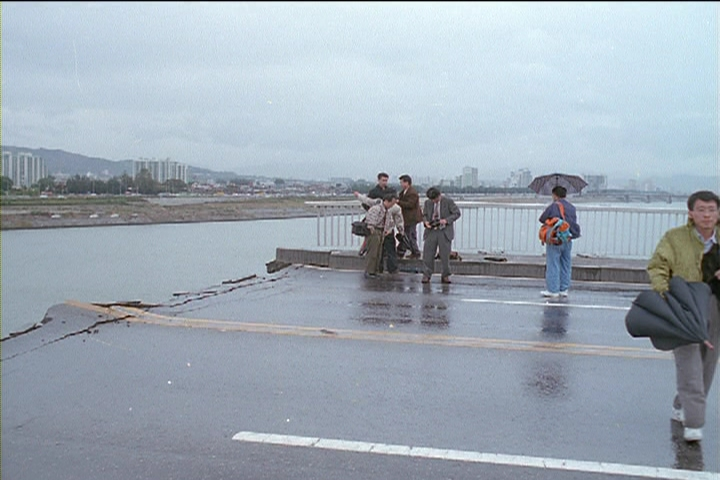
Reporters gathering on the edge of the bridge

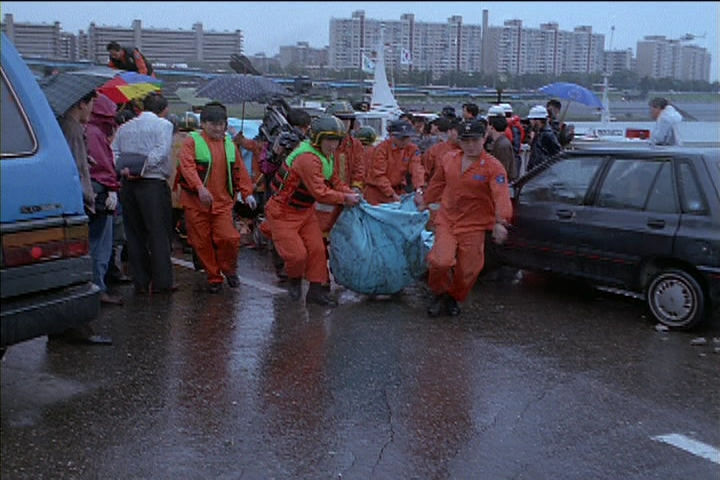
First responders carrying light blue bags away from the disaster scene

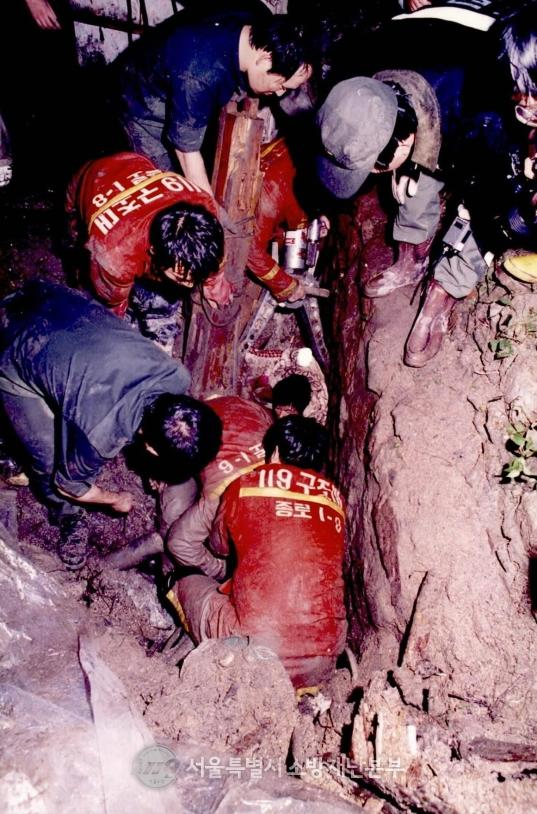
Rescue workers wearing orange uniforms

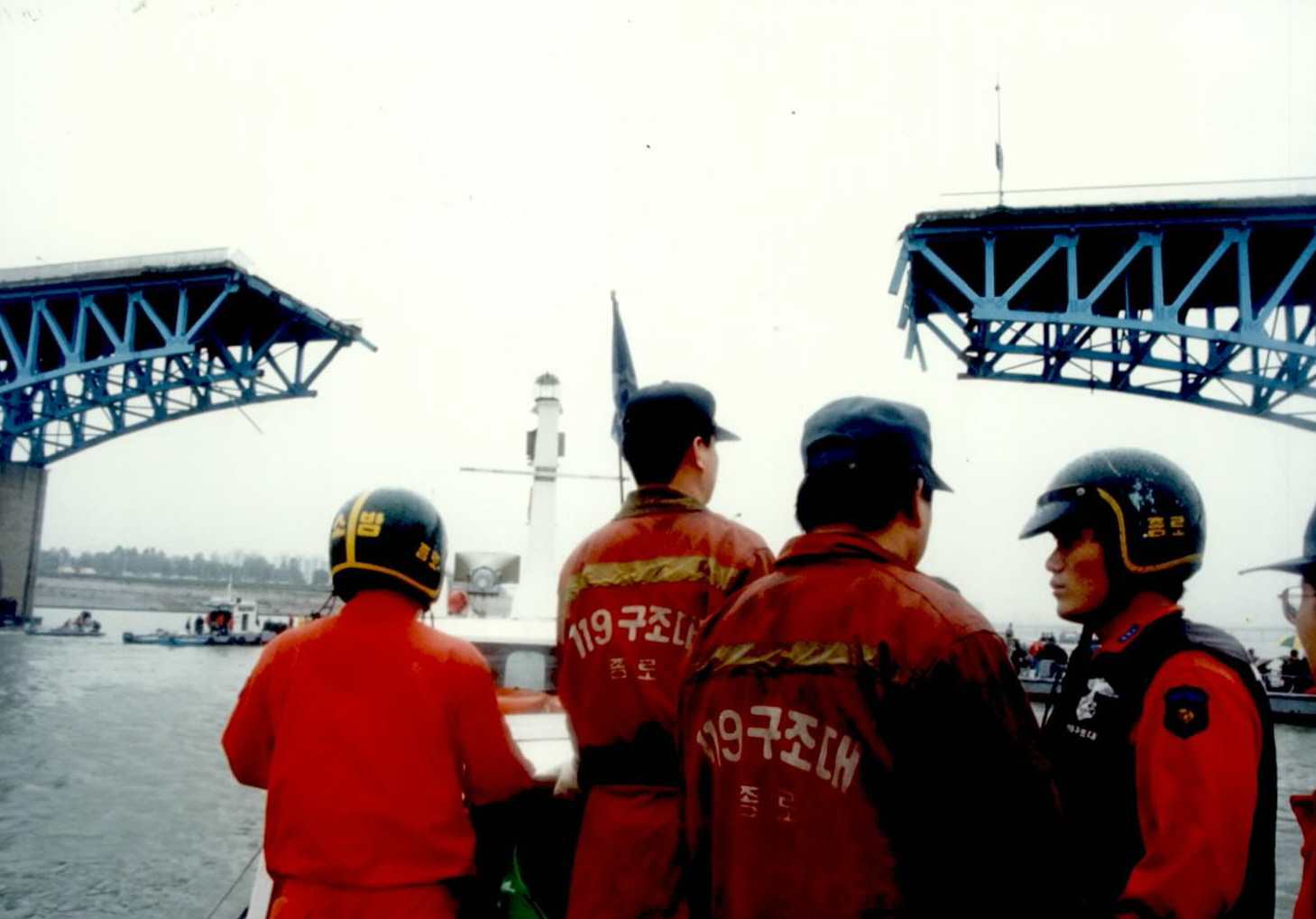
Rescue workers approaching the bridge collapse

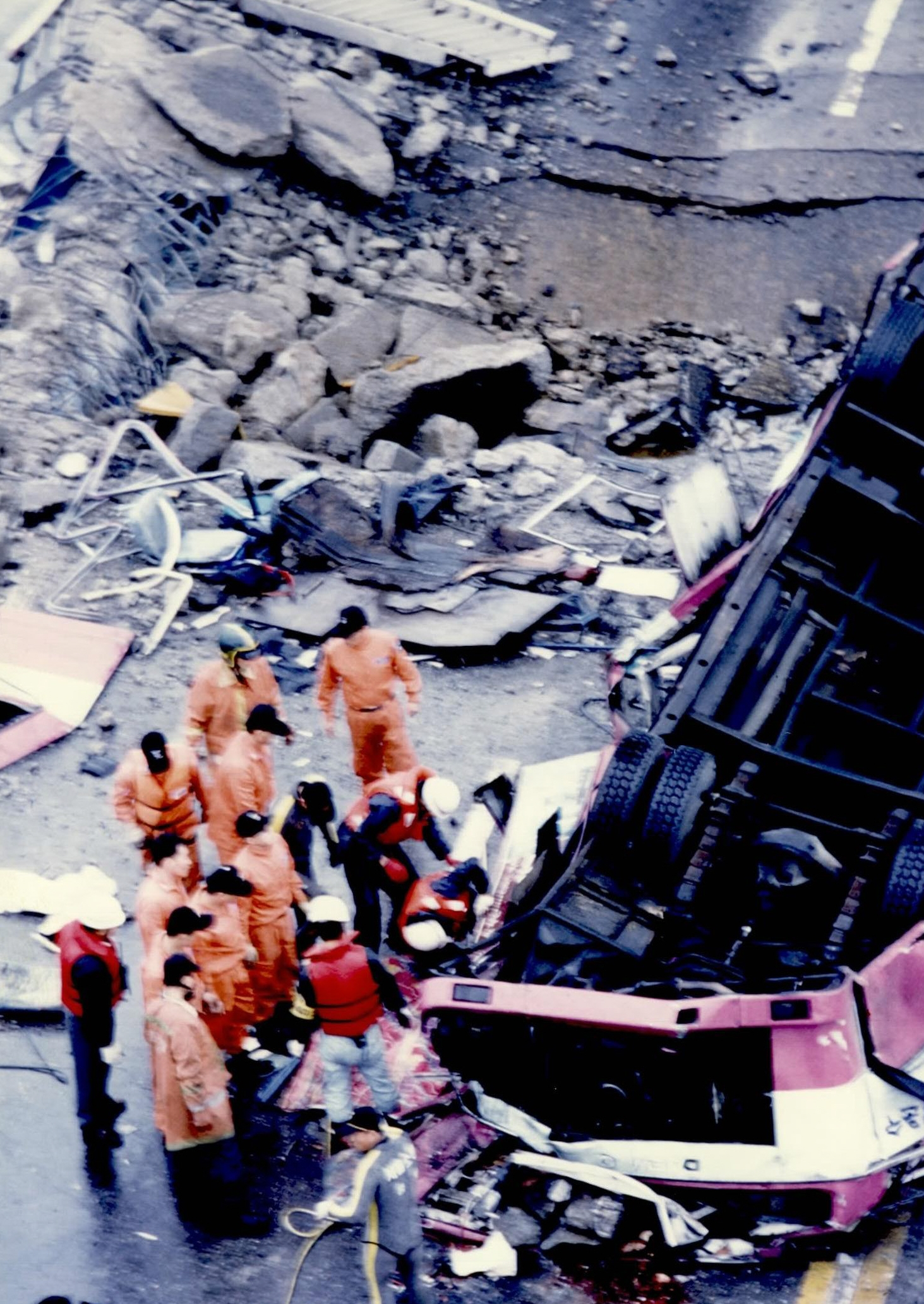
The crushed Number 16 bus

== See also ==
- List of bridge failures
- List of man-made disasters in South Korea
- Daegu subway fire (2003)
- I-35W Mississippi River Bridge collapse (2007)
- Sinking of MV Sewol (2014)
- 2021 Gwangju building collapse
- Gwangju Hwajeong I-Park exterior wall collapse (2022)

== Notes and references ==
=== Sources ===
==== Books ====
- Kim, Yong-kyun (2017). Disaster risk management in the Republic of Korea. Hong-Gyoo Sohn. Singapore: Springer. ISBN 978-981-10-4789-3. OCLC 993623594.
- Koo, Hagen (2022). Privilege and Anxiety: The Korean Middle Class in the Global Era. Ithaca: Cornell University Press. ISBN 978-1-5017-6492-9. OCLC 1295620078.
- Schultz, Arturo E.; Pipinato, Alesso; Gastineau, Andrew J. (2021). "Bridge collapse". In Pipinato, Alessio (ed.). Innovative Bridge Design Handbook: Construction, Rehabilitation and Maintenance (2nd ed.). Kidlington, Oxford: Butterworth-Heinemann. ISBN 9780128235508. OCLC 1268546613.
- Wearne, Phillip (2000). Collapse: When Buildings Fall Down. New York: TV Books. ISBN 1-57500-144-6. OCLC 43913268.

==== Journals and magazines ====
- Koh, B. C. (January 1, 1996). "South Korea in 1995: Tremors of Transition". Asian Survey. 36 (1): 53–60. doi:10.2307/2645555. ISSN 0004-4687. JSTOR 2645555.

==== Newspaper articles ====
- "32 Reported Dead as Bridge Collapses in Seoul". The New York Times. Reuters. October 22, 1994. p. 5. ISSN 0362-4331. Archived from the original on October 26, 2022.
- Pollack, Andrew (November 18, 1994). "Seoul Journal; A Crisis of Faith: Is the New Korea Jerry-Built?". The New York Times. p. 4. ISSN 0362-4331. Archived from the original on February 17, 2023.
- "7 Held in Seoul Disaster". The New York Times. Reuters. October 23, 1994. p. 15. ISSN 0362-4331. Archived from the original on February 17, 2023.

==== White paper released by the Seoul District Prosecutor's Office ====
- Seoul National University Department of Civil Engineering (June 1995). 聖水大橋 崩壞事件 原因糾明鑑定團 活動白書 [White Paper on the Activities of the Seongsu Bridge Collapse Incident Investigation Team]. Seoul District Prosecutor's Office.

==== Websites and television ====
- 이, 춘호; 이, 윤성 (October 21, 1994). "날벼락 현장...성수대교 붕괴사고" [The site of the lightning strike...the Seongsu Bridge collapse disaster] (in Korean). KBS News. Archived from the original on February 18, 2023.
- 배, 종호; 이, 윤성 (October 21, 1994). "성수대교 붕괴사고...예견된 인재" [The Seongsu Bridge collapse disaster...a foreseeable incident] (in Korean). KBS News. Archived from the original on February 17, 2023.
- 하, 준수; 이, 윤성 (October 21, 1994). "성수대교 붕괴사고로 32명 사망" [32 dead from the Seongsu Bridge collapse disaster] (in Korean). KBS News. Archived from the original on February 17, 2023.
- 유, 석조; 이, 윤성 (October 21, 1994). "[초점인물] 서울지방경찰청 3기동대" [[Focal Figure] Seoul Metropolitan Police Agency Task Force 3] (in Korean). KBS News. Archived from the original on February 17, 2023.
- 황, 상무 (October 21, 1994). "8번째 대형 교량 붕괴사고...성수대교 붕괴" [The 8th large-scale bridge collapse disaster...the collapse of the Seongsu Bridge] (in Korean). KBS News. Archived from the original on February 17, 2023.
- 황, 상무; 김, 광일 (October 22, 1994). "성수대교 건설 부실 있었다" [Poor construction involved in the construction of the Seongsu Bridge] (in Korean). KBS News. Archived from the original on February 17, 2023.
- 김, 종명; 김, 광일 (October 22, 1994). "교량건설 왜 부실한가...그릇된 관행과 건설 환경" [Why is the quality of bridge construction poor...bad practices and construction conditions] (in Korean). KBS News. Archived from the original on February 18, 2023.
- 유, 석조; 김, 광일 (October 23, 1994). "교량 붕괴 주범은 과적차량...철저한 단속 필요" [The main culprit of the bridge collapse were overloaded vehicles...a thorough crackdown is needed] (in Korean). KBS News. Archived from the original on February 17, 2023.
- "Collapse of Seongsu Bridge". National Emergency Management Agency (South Korea). Archived from the original on March 3, 2006.
- 하, 재근; 백, 성문; 전, 예현; 허, 주연; 구, 자룡. "그날 무너진 안전 '성수대교 붕괴 참사'" [The day of the Seongsu Bridge collapse disaster]. News Fighter (in Korean). MBN News. Archived from the original on February 22, 2023.
