= Rha Woong-bae =

South Korean politician (1934–2022)

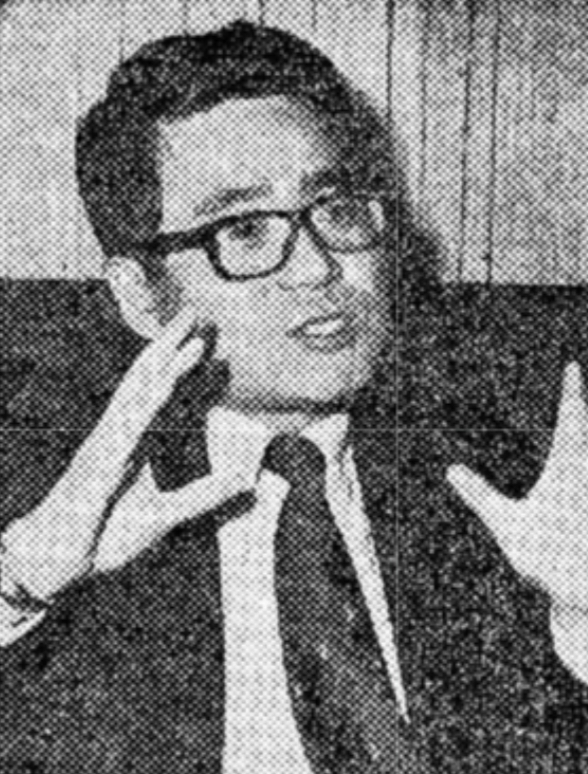

16th Deputy Prime Minister of South Korea and Minister for Economic Planning Board
- In office 25 February 1988 – 5 December 1988
- President: Roh Tae-woo
- Prime Minister: Lee Hyun Jae
- Preceded by: Chung In-yong
- Succeeded by: Cho Soon

29th Deputy Prime Minister of South Korea, Minister of Unification (until 21 Dec. 1995) and Minister of Economy and Finance (from 21 Dec. 1995)
- In office 22 February 1995 – 8 August 1996
- President: Kim Young-sam
- Prime Minister: Lee Hong-koo; Lee Soo-sung
- Preceded by: Kim Duck
- Succeeded by: Kwon Oh-kee

Personal details
- Born: 24 July 1934
- Died: 25 April 2022 (aged 87)
- Education: University of California, Berkeley

Korean name
- Hangul: 나웅배
- Hanja: 羅雄培
- RR: Na Ungbae
- MR: Na Ungbae

Rha Woong-bae (Korean: 나웅배; 24 July 1934 – 25 April 2022) was a South Korean politician and businessman who was the Chairman of the Hanbit Forum. He was also Finance and Economy Minister and Deputy Prime Minister of South Korea under President Kim Young-sam. He served as Trade and Industry Minister in the 1980s.

He held a PhD (1968) from the Haas School of Business at the University of California, Berkeley.

== Election results ==
Year	Elections	Constituency	Political party	Votes (%)	Results
1981	11th National Assembly General Election	National (35th)	DJP	5,776,624 (35.64%)	Elected
1985	12th National Assembly General Election	National (13rd)	DJP	7,040,477 (35.25%)	Elected
1989	August 1989 By-election	Yeongdeungpo B (Seoul)	DJP	45,187 (38.68%)	Won
1992	14th National Assembly General Election	Yeongdeungpo B (Seoul)	DLP	48,411 (41.18%)	Won
