= Dangsan Railway Bridge =

Railway bridge in Seoul, South Korea

Coordinates: 37°32′27″N 126°54′29″E

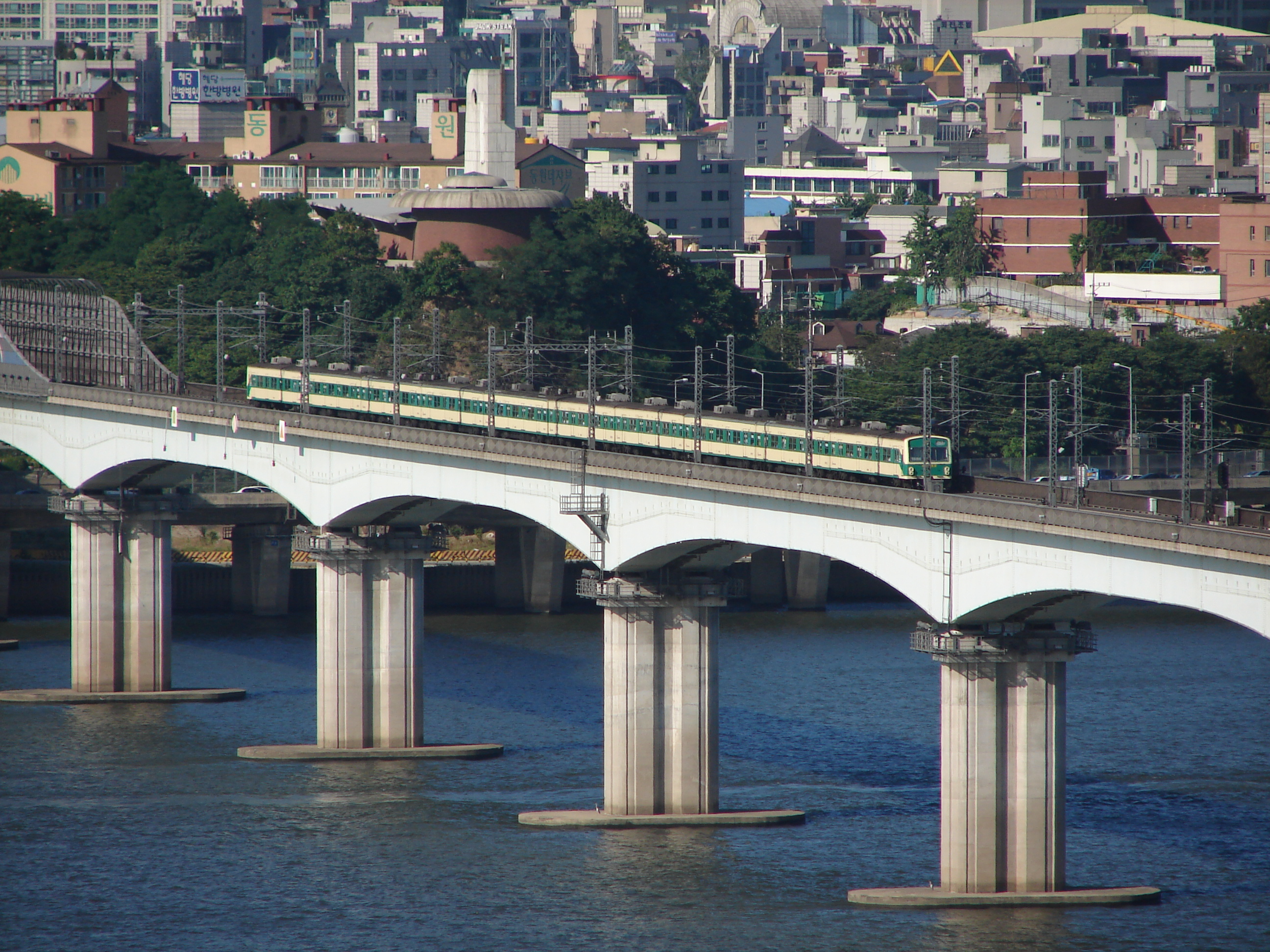
- Dangsan railway bridge. The Seoul Subway Line 2 train is heading south across the Han River.

Korean name
- Hangul: 당산철교
- Hanja: 堂山鐵橋
- RR: Dangsan cheolgyo
- MR: Tangsan ch'ŏlgyo

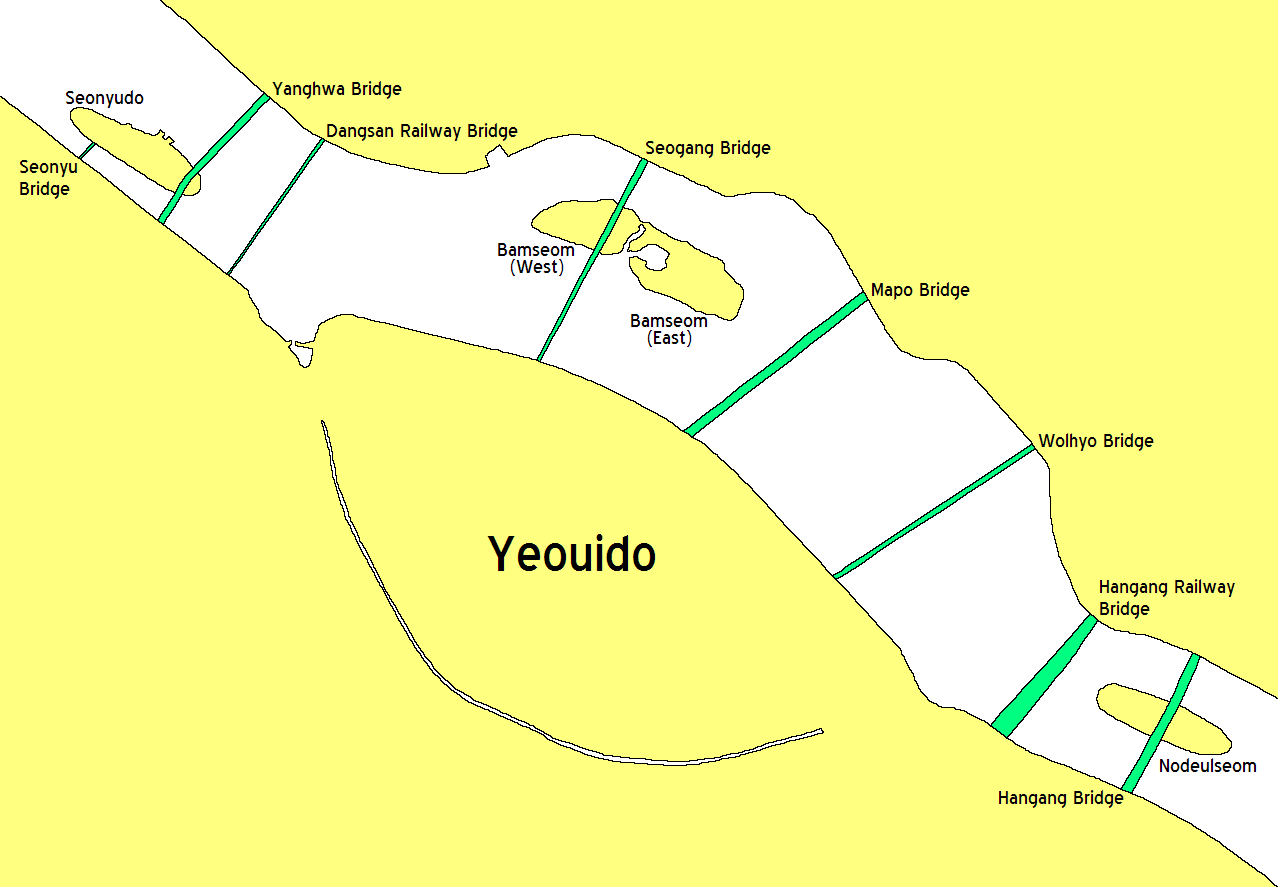
Yeouido Map

The Dangsan Railway Bridge (Korean: 당산철교) is a railway bridge that crosses the Han River in Seoul. It is used exclusively by Seoul Subway Line 2. Immediately on the south side of the bridge is Dangsan Station in Yeongdeungpo District, which is on an elevated platform. Hapjeong Station, a subterranean station in Mapo District, is located approximately 600 meters north of where the bridge makes landfall.

Following the Seongsu Bridge disaster, every bridge in Seoul was re-examined for safety and it was decided that Dangsan Bridge should be taken down and rebuilt. Amid considerable controversy, this bridge was closed for reconstruction on December 31, 1996. The reconstruction finished on November 22, 1999.

== See also ==
- List of Han River bridges
- Seongsu Bridge
