= Cho Soon =

South Korean politician (1928–2022)

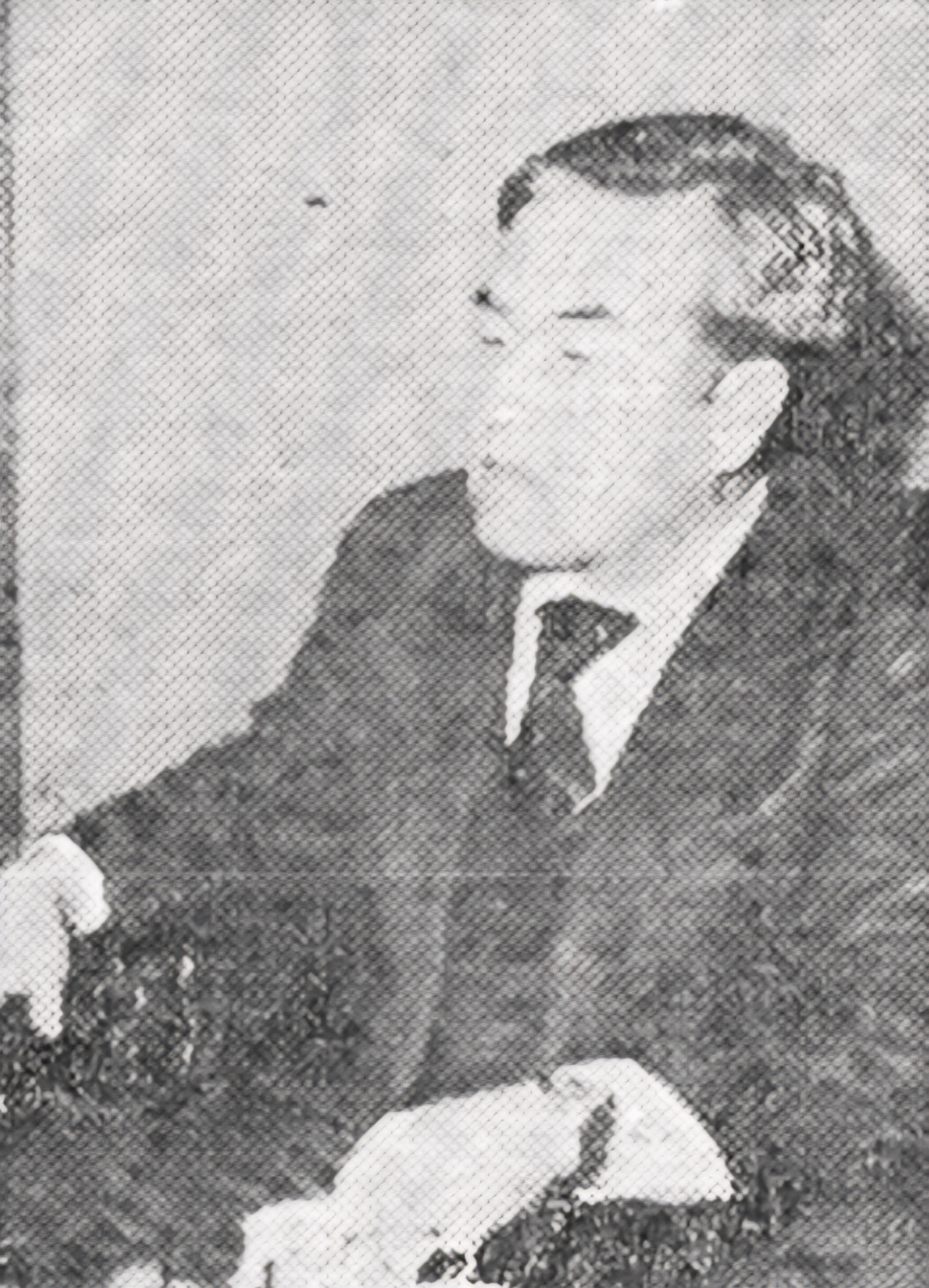

30th Mayor of Seoul
- In office 1 July 1995 – 9 September 1997
- President: Kim Young-sam
- Prime Minister: Lee Hong-koo; Lee Soo-sung; Goh Kun
- Preceded by: Choi Byung-ryeol
- Succeeded by: Kang Deok-ki (acting); Goh Kun

18th Governor of the Bank of Korea
- In office 26 March 1992 – 14 March 1993
- President: Roh Tae-woo; Kim Young-sam
- Prime Minister: Chung Won-shik; Hyun Soong-jong; Hwang In-sung
- Preceded by: Kim Kun
- Succeeded by: Kim Myung-ho

17th Deputy Prime Minister of South Korea
- In office 5 December 1988 – 17 March 1990
- President: Roh Tae-woo
- Prime Minister: Kang Young-hoon
- Preceded by: Rha Woong-bae
- Succeeded by: Lee Seung-yoon

Personal details
- Born: 1 February 1928 Jumunjin, Kōgen Province, Korea, Empire of Japan
- Died: 23 June 2022 (aged 94) Seoul, South Korea
- Party: Grand National; Democratic People's
- Education: Seoul National University; University of California, Berkeley
- Occupation: Professor, Politician

Korean name
- Hangul: 조순
- Hanja: 趙淳
- RR: Jo Sun
- MR: Cho Sun

Cho Soon (Korean: 조순; 1 February 1928 – 23 June 2022) was a South Korean politician who was the first publicly elected mayor of Seoul, serving from 1995 to 1997. Previously, he held office as the deputy prime minister of South Korea from 1988 to 1990 and as the governor of the Bank of Korea from 1992 to 1993.

== Life ==
Cho Soon was born in February 1928 in Jumunjin, Kōgen Province, Korea, Empire of Japan. He graduated from Seoul National University in 1949 and earned a doctorate from the University of California, Berkeley.

As a member of the Grand National Party and later the Democratic People's Party, he held many political positions throughout his life.

Cho became Deputy Prime Minister and Finance Minister of South Korea under President Roh Tae-woo. He was succeeded in the position by Lee Seung-yoon in 1990. In 1992, he became the Governor of the Bank of Korea, a position he left a year later. In 1995, he ran for Mayor of Seoul, winning the race decisively with 42.4% of the vote. He assumed the office on 1 July 1995, becoming the first elected mayor of the city. Cho later served in the National Assembly from 1998 to 2000.

He died in Seoul on 23 June 2022 of natural causes at the age of 94.

== Election results ==
=== General elections ===
Year	Elections	Constituency	Political party	Votes (%)	Results
1998	July 1998 By-election	Gangneung B (Gangwon)	GNP	28,181 (61.13%)	Won

=== Local elections ===
==== Mayor of Seoul ====
Year	Elections	Constituency	Political party	Votes (%)	Remarks
1995	1st Iocal Election	Seoul (Mayoral Elections)	Democratic	2,051,441 (42.35%)	Won
