= DR & AJU =

South Korean law firm

D&A LLC
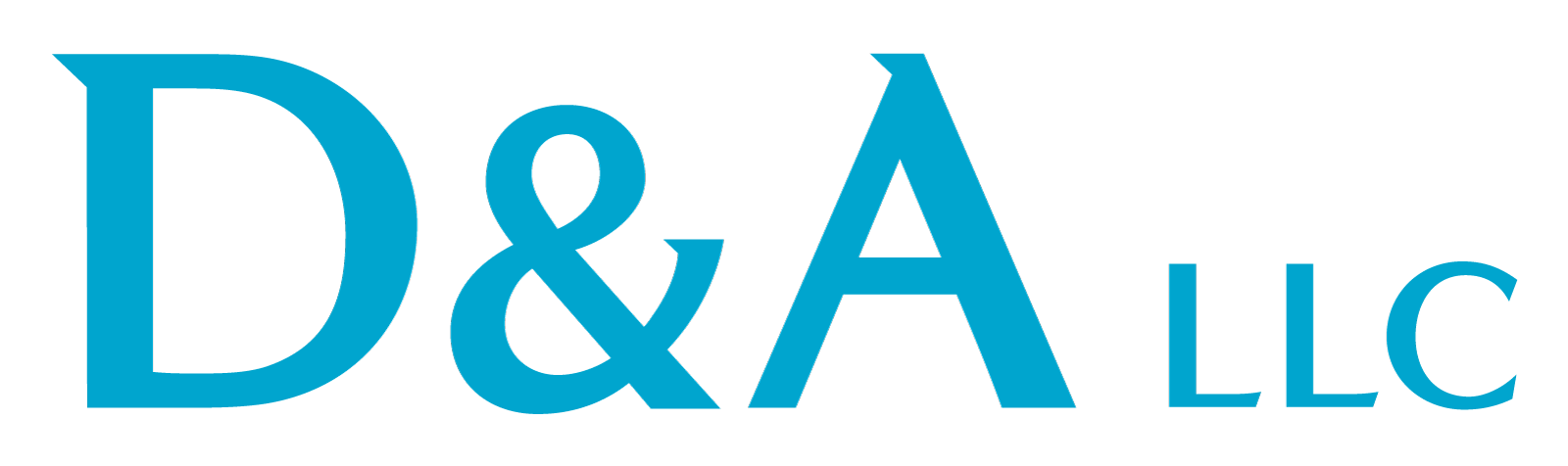
- No. of attorneys: 158
- Key people: AJU founder, Kim Jin-Han; Daeryook founder, Kim Dae-Hui
- Date founded: 2009
- Company type: Limited liability company
- Website: www.draju.com/eng/

D&A LLC is a Korea-based international law firm headquartered in Seoul. Since the 2009 merger of Daeryook (DR) and AJU, the firm has expanded to over 220 attorneys and is now among the top ten firms in Korea.

== History ==
=== Daeryook International Law Firm ===
The Kim Dae-Hui Law Office opened in 1992, and after former prosecutor Hahm Seung-Hui joined in 1994, the founding partners changed the name to “Hahm & Kim.” It was renamed Daeryook Law Group in 1996 and had expanded to several international branches by 2002. The firm focused on the emerging CRC (Corporate Restructuring Company) field and REITs, a survival strategy born from the 1997 Asian financial crisis. The firm also successfully pursued a case brought against the U.S. government in U.S. court on behalf of the victims of the 1997 Korean Air Flight 801 crash in Guam.

=== AJU International Law Group ===
Kim Jin-Han founded AJU law office in 1993 and established AJU International Law Group in 1994. Following the 1997 Asian financial crisis, the firm was appointed bankruptcy trustee for many major cases. AJU had expanded to multiple practice areas and added branch offices in Mongolia, Vietnam, Cambodia, UAE, Austria by 2007.

=== D&A LLC ===
The economic downturn from the 2008 financial crisis forced both Daeryook (DR) and AJU to close overseas offices. Growth resumed after the 2009 merger. Both firms had around 50 attorneys each in 2008 for a total of 100, but in 2020 the combined firm has nearly 220 attorneys. The firm has been noted for work in “David vs. Goliath” cases where it represented the smaller party. DR & AJU entered into an association with UK/German firm Taylor Wessing and its Singaporean office RHTLaw Taylor Wessing in 2014, making the firm the Seoul office of Taylor Wessing's ASEAN Plus Group of law firms.

== Corporate social responsibility ==
As of April 2017, six DR & AJU attorneys are participating in the Ministry of Justice (South Korea)-backed 9988 SME Support Group. The attorneys provide pro bono advise to SMEs looking to expand production through exports. The firm also supports Happitory, a social organization founded in part by DR & AJU Partner Yongsuk Kwon. In addition to providing support for at-risk youth and others in need in Korea and abroad, the group also runs "내 안의 감옥" (The Prison Inside Me), a retreat that aids those suffering from the stress of modern living. In 2016, the firm signed the NGO MoU Rainbow Chian which assists foreign students, workers and tourists or ethnic minorities experiencing difficulties in Korea. DR & AJU will give initial consultations pro bono, and Rainbow Chian will retain the firm to handle complicated cases.

== Notable members ==
- Cho Jae Yeon, former judge and DR & AJU Managing Partner, appointed Supreme Court Justice by President Moon Jae-in, July 19, 2017
- Kim Suk Soo, Of-Counsel, Prime Minister of the Republic of Korea (2002–2003)

== Recognitions & Awards ==
- DR & AJU wins Best Shipping Firm at Korea Law Awards 2017
