= Kim Suk-soo =

South Korean politician (born 1932)

His Excellency Kim Suk-soo
- 김석수
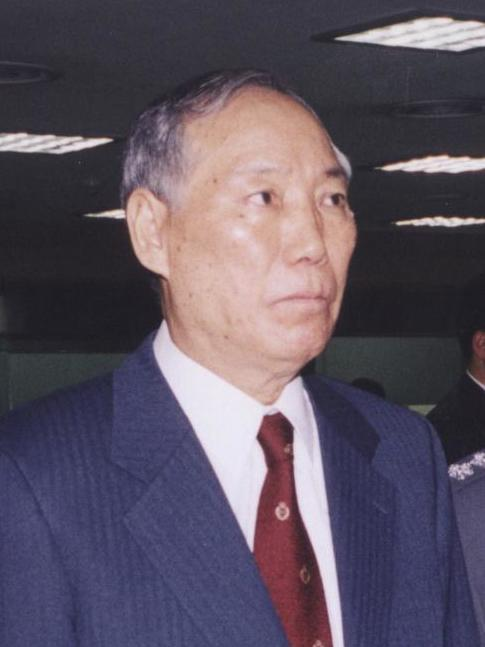
- Kim in 2002

34th Prime Minister of South Korea
- In office 10 September 2002 – 4 October 2002 (acting)
- President: Kim Dae-jung
- Preceded by: Lee Han-dong; Chang Sang (acting); Jeon Yun-churl (acting); Chang Dae-whan (acting)
- Succeeded by: (Himself)
- In office 5 October 2002 – 26 February 2003
- President: Kim Dae-jung; Roh Moo-hyun
- Preceded by: (Himself)
- Succeeded by: Goh Kun

Personal details
- Born: 20 November 1932 (age 93) Katō-gun, Keishōnan-dō, Korea, Empire of Japan
- Education: Yonsei University
- Occupation: Politician, lawyer

Korean name
- Hangul: 김석수
- Hanja: 金碩洙
- RR: Gim Seoksu
- MR: Kim Sŏksu

Kim Suk-soo (Korean: 김석수; born 20 November 1932) is a South Korean politician and lawyer who served as the Prime minister of South Korea from 2002 to 2003 under President Kim Dae-jung.

== Biography ==
Kim graduated from Paichai High School in 1952 and Yonsei University in 1956 with a bachelor's degree in law. After his service as a justice of the Supreme Court and chairman of the National Election Commission, Kim was nominated by President Kim Dae-jung to be Prime minister on 10 September 2002. He was the president's third choice for the position, vacant since the removal of Lee Han-dong, following the opposition-controlled parliament's rejection of Chang Sang and Chang Dae-whan. He was confirmed on 5 October 2002, by a vote of 210 to 31. New President Roh Moo-hyun chose Goh Kun as Kim's replacement on 26 February 2003.

On 25 April 2013, Kim was elected as the head director of Yonsei University after Bang Woo-Young, a former chairman of The Chosun Ilbo, resigned. Kim is also an Of Counsel at DR & AJU LLC.
