= Seongsu Bridge =

Han River bridge in Seoul, South Korea

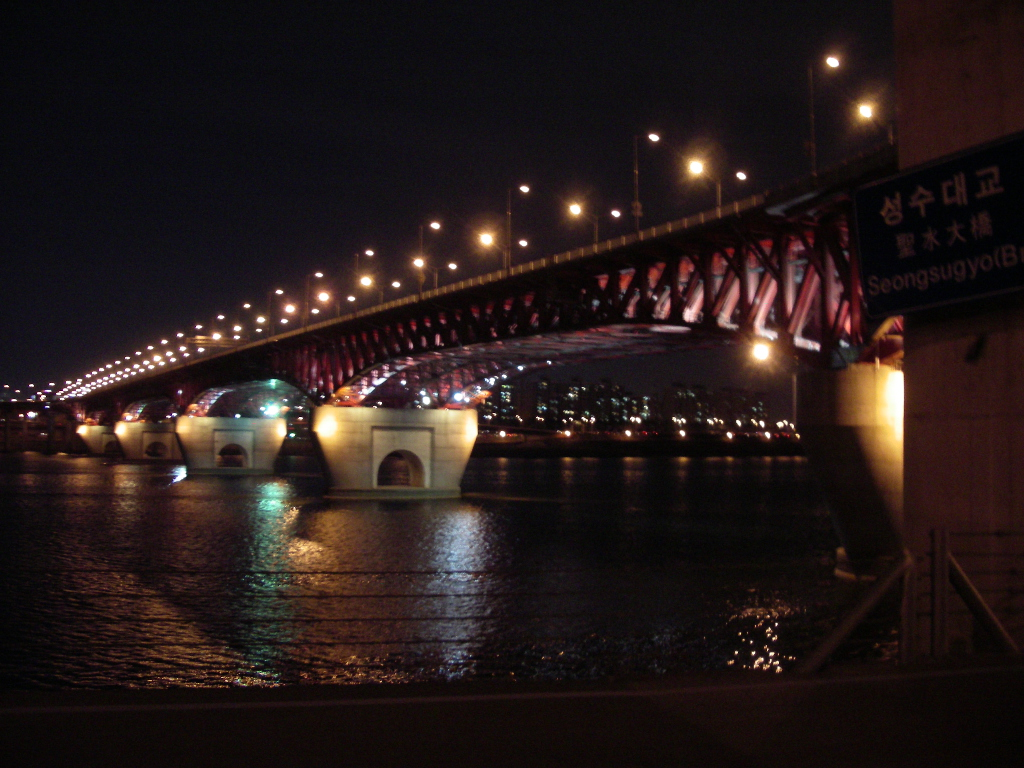
- The rebuilt Seongsu Bridge in February 2008.
- Coordinates: 37°32′15″N 127°02′06″E
- Locale: Han River, Seoul, South Korea
- Other name: Sŏngsu Bridge
- Maintained by: Seoul Metropolitan Government

Characteristics
- No. of lanes: 8 (formerly 4)

History
- Constructed by: Dong Ah Construction Industrial Company (Old); Hyundai Engineering & Construction (Current)
- Built: April 9, 1977-October 15, 1979
- Construction cost: 11.58 billion won (Old); 78 billion won (Current)
- Rebuilt: April 26, 1995 - July 3, 1997
- Collapsed: 7:38 a.m. Korea Standard Time on October 21, 1994

Korean name
- Hangul: 성수대교
- Hanja: 聖水大橋
- RR: Seongsu daegyo
- MR: Sŏngsu taegyo

Location
- Interactive map of Seongsu Bridge

The Seongsu Bridge (Korean: 성수대교), sometimes spelled Sŏngsu Bridge, is a cantilever bridge over the Han River, connecting the Seongdong and Gangnam districts of Seoul, South Korea. The bridge began construction under Hyundai Engineering & Construction on April 26, 1995 and was opened to the public on July 3, 1997 by Seoul Mayor Cho Soon (조순). The original Seongsu Bridge was built in 1979, and was demolished and rebuilt following the Seongsu Bridge disaster on October 21, 1994.

== History ==
=== Original bridge ===
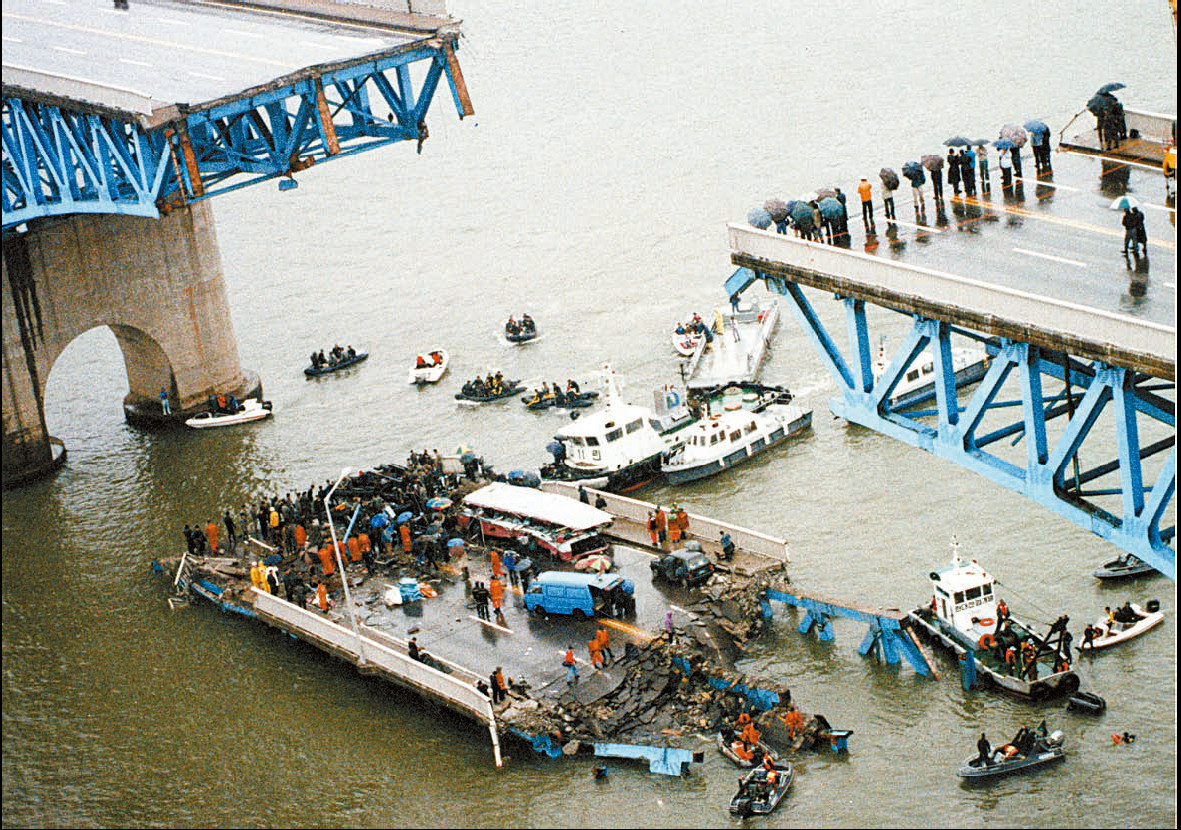
Seongsu Bridge disaster

The original Seongsu Bridge was built by Dong Ah Construction Industrial Company, opening to the public on October 15, 1979. The bridge spanned 1,160 meters (3,810 ft) and was 19.4 meters (64 ft) wide, accommodating 4 lanes of traffic. Fifteen years later, on the morning of October 21, 1994, a span of the Seongsu Bridge collapsed, killing 32 people and injuring 17 others. The collapse was ruled a result of poor welding, rusted extension hinges, and lack of general maintenance— and would result in the convictions of 16 city government and construction workers on charges of criminal negligence.

In the aftermath of the disaster, the Seoul Metropolitan Government originally planned to repair and reopen the bridge to traffic within three months, but reversed course after public outcry.

=== New bridge ===
Construction for the new bridge began in March 1996 under Hyundai Engineering & Construction. Construction for the replacement bridge cost 78 billion won (equivalent to ₩160 billion in 2025), about 6.8 times the original price. The new bridge was opened to the public on July 3, 1997, by Mayor Cho Soon, and a memorial was held on the bridge.

== See also ==
- List of Han River bridges
- Seongsu Bridge disaster
- House of Hummingbird
