= Goh Kun =

South Korean politician (born 1938)

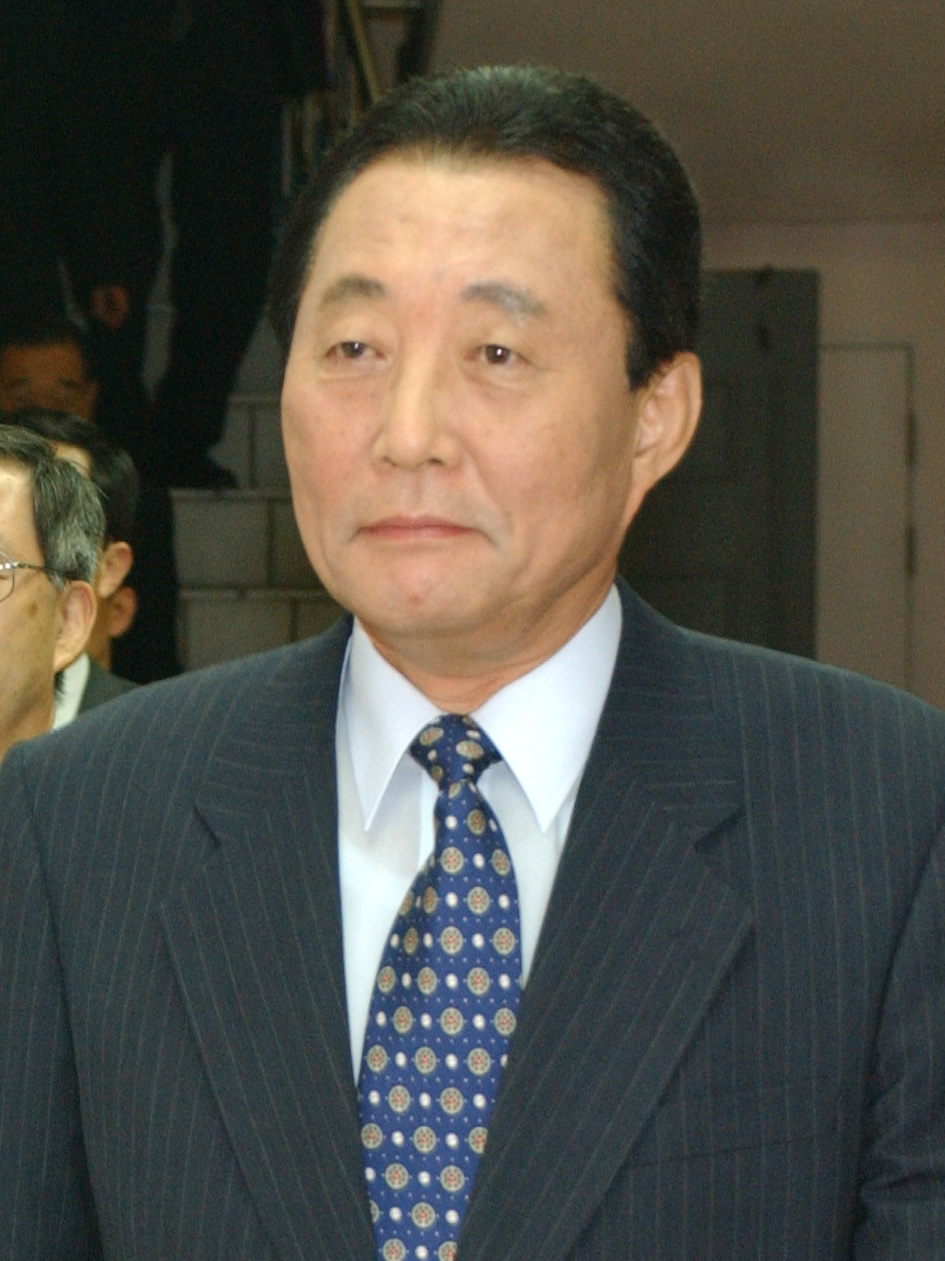
- Goh in 2003

Acting President of South Korea
- In office 12 March 2004 – 14 May 2004 (Note: While President Roh's powers and duties were suspended)
- President: Roh Moo-hyun
- Prime Minister: Himself

30th & 35th Prime Minister of South Korea
- In office 5 March 1997 – 2 March 1998
- President: Kim Young-sam; Kim Dae-jung
- Preceded by: Lee Soo-sung
- Succeeded by: Kim Jong-pil
- In office 27 February 2003 – 24 May 2004
- President: Roh Moo-hyun
- Preceded by: Kim Suk-soo
- Succeeded by: Lee Hun Jai (acting); Lee Hae-chan

22nd & 31st Mayor of Seoul
- In office 5 December 1988 – 26 December 1990
- President: Kim Dae-jung
- Preceded by: Kim Yong Nae
- Succeeded by: Park Seh-jik
- In office 1 July 1998 – 30 June 2002
- President: Kim Dae-jung
- Preceded by: Cho Soon; Kang Duk-ki (acting)
- Succeeded by: Lee Myung-bak

Personal details
- Born: 2 January 1938 (age 88) Keijō, Korea, Empire of Japan
- Party: Democratic Justice (1981–1990); Democratic Liberal (1990–1994); Independent (1994–1997, 1998); New Korea (1997); Grand National (1997–1998); National Congress (1998–2000); Millennium Democratic (2000–2002); Independent (2002–)
- Education: Seoul National University (BS, MS)

Korean name
- Hangul: 고건
- Hanja: 高建
- RR: Go Geon
- MR: Ko Kŏn

Goh Kun (Korean: 고건, born 2 January 1938) is a South Korean politician who served as the prime minister of South Korea from 1997 to 1998 and again from 2003 to 2004. He was the acting president of South Korea at the time of Roh Moo-hyun's suspension in 2004 and the mayor of Seoul from 1988 to 1990 and again from 1998 to 2002.

== Early life and education ==
Goh Kun was born on 2 January 1938 in modern day Seoul, South Korea and attended Kyunggi High School from 1953 to 1956. In 1960, Goh earned a Bachelor of Science degree in political science from Seoul National University, where he was President of the Student Council. He returned to the university in 1968 and graduated with a master's degree in 1971, majoring in urban planning.

== Political career ==
Goh began his career in civil service in the 1960s, when he joined the Ministry of Home Affairs as a probationary officer. He was promoted through various positions, including the Governor of South Jeolla from 1975 to 1979, the Minister of Transportation from 1980 to 1981 and Minister of Agriculture and Fisheries from 1981 to 1982.

In 1985, Goh was elected as a Member of the National Assembly, before being appointed the mayor of Seoul in 1988. When he refused to approve a questionable development proposal in 1990, he was removed from office. However, he returned to the position in 1998, this time by election, and served until 2002. During his tenure, he initiated a "10 million trees of life" program in the Seoul and sought more aggressive emissions standards, which led to a significant greening of the city.

== Prime Minister and acting president ==
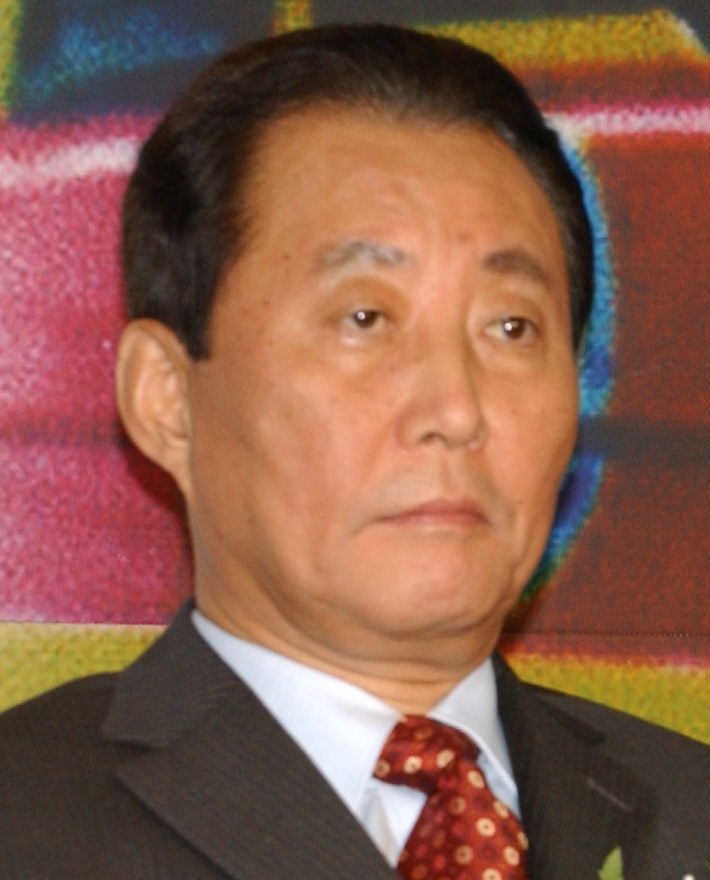
- Acting presidency of Goh Kun; March 12, 2004 – May 14, 2004
- Prime Minister: Himself
- Cabinet: Full list
- Party: Millenium Democratic
- Seat: Seoul

He served as Prime Minister of South Korea from 1997 to 1998 and from 2003 to 2004.

He assumed the role of interim President following President Roh Moo-Hyun's impeachment, from 12 March 2004 until 14 May 2004, when the South Korean Constitutional Court overturned the impeachment decision and restored Roh's powers as President. He resigned from the office of Prime Minister on 24 May 2004 after refusing to comply with the President's request to replace cabinet members. He was succeeded in the office by Lee Hae-chan, who was approved on 30 June. Along with Goh, three other cabinet members were also replaced.

== After political service ==
In June 2006, Goh announced his candidacy for the presidential race.

On 16 January 2007, he announced that he would no longer be a candidate for the presidential elections and that he would retire from political life. Despite his retirement, he was named head of social unity council by President Lee Myung-bak on 21 December 2009.

== Election results ==
=== General elections ===
| Year | Elections | Constituency | Political party | Votes (%) | Results |
|---|---|---|---|---|---|
| 1985 | 12th National Assembly General Election | Gunsan–Okgu (North Jeolla) | DJP | 67,179 (49.71%) | Won |
| 1988 | 13th National Assembly General Election | Gunsan (North Jeolla) | DJP | 28,118 (35.54%) | Defeated (2nd) |

=== Local elections ===
==== Mayor of Seoul ====
| Year | Elections | Constituency | Political party | Votes (%) | Remarks |
|---|---|---|---|---|---|
| 1998 | 2nd Iocal Election | Seoul (Mayoral Elections) | NCNP | 1,838,348 (53.46%) | Won |

== See also ==
- Impeachment of Roh Moo-hyun

== Notes ==
Political offices
| Preceded by Kim Yong-rae | Mayor of Seoul; 1988–1990 | Succeeded by Park Seh-jik |
| Preceded by Cho Soon; Kang Duk-ki; Acting | Mayor of Seoul; 1998–2002 | Succeeded by Lee Myung-bak |
| Preceded by Lee Soo-sung | Prime Minister of South Korea; 1997–1998 | Succeeded by Kim Jong-pil |
| Preceded by Kim Suk-soo | Prime Minister of South Korea; 2003–2004 | Succeeded by Lee Hun-jai; Acting; Lee Hae-chan |
| Preceded by Roh Moo-hyun | President of South Korea; Acting; 2004; While President Roh's powers and duties were suspended | Succeeded by Roh Moo-hyun |
