= HDC Hyundai Development Company =

South Korean company

- Native name: HDC현대산업개발
- Company type: Public company
- Traded as: KRX: 294870
- Founded: May 2, 2018
- Headquarters: Seoul, South Korea
- Key people: Chung Mong-gyu (CEO)
- Subsidiaries: Hotel HDC
- Website: www.hdc-dvp.com

HDC Hyundai Development Company (Korean: HDC현대산업개발) was created in 2018 through a spin-off from HDC Group's holding company HDC Holdings. The company is active in real estate development, construction and hospitality.

== History ==
HDC Hyundai Development Company was established through the merger between Hyundai Group's two subsidiaries – Korea City Development founded in 1976 and Halla Construction founded in 1977. Korea City Development Company was created in 1976 when Hyundai Engineering & Construction separated its housing business. Korea City Development specialized in Hyundai Group's housing construction business and built apartments under the brand name, Hyundai Apartment. Halla Construction, founded by Chung In-yung, brother to Chung Ju-yung, the founder and former chairman of Hyundai Group, focused on civil engineering, plant and overseas businesses.

Hyundai Development Company has been formed in 1986 by the merger of both companies. With the inauguration of Chairman Chung Mong-gyu and honorary president Chung Se-yung in 1999, Hyundai Development Company was separated from Hyundai Group in August 1999. Thereafter, Hyundai Development Company has evolved into the parent in HDC Group.

Hyundai Development Company launched a new brand, IPARK, in March 2001.

In November 2019, HDC Hyundai Development Company was selected as the preferred bidder for financially troubled Asiana Airlines. However, on 11 September 2020, the Korea Development Bank and Kumho Asiana Group officially called off the merger with Hyundai Development Company.

In January 2022 the company has faced public criticism and government scrutiny following the Gwangju Hwajeong I-Park exterior wall collapse, which occurred just months after the 2021 Gwangju building collapse.

== See also ==
- Busan IPark
- IPARK
