= IPARK =

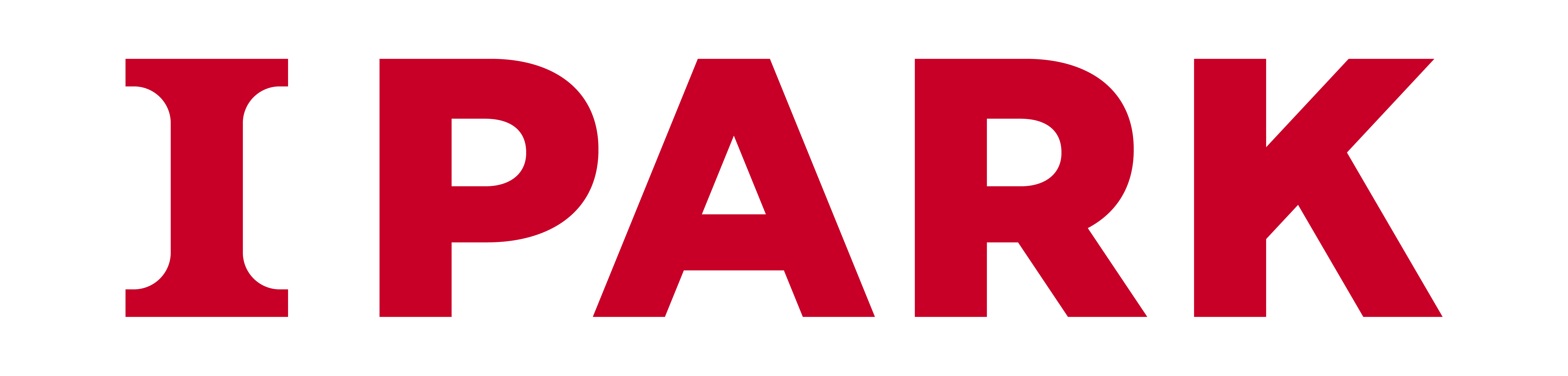
2021 IPARK BI

IPARK is an apartment brand launched by Hyundai Development Company in 2001. Prior to IPARK, Hyundai Development Company used Hyundai Apartment as the main brand for its housing business. Hyundai Development Company launched IPARK. Hyundai Development Company has built more than 350,000 housing units under the brand names such as Hyundai Apartment and IPARK.

== Logo History ==
Year	B/I
2021	2021 IPARK BI
2017	2017 IPARK BI
2012	2012 IPARK BI
2006	2006 IPARK BI
2004	2004 IPARK BI
2001	2001 IPARK BI
2000	2000 Hyundai I Apartment BI
1986	1986 Hyundai Apartment BI
1984	1984 Hyundai Apartment BI
