= Taylor Wessing =

Law firm

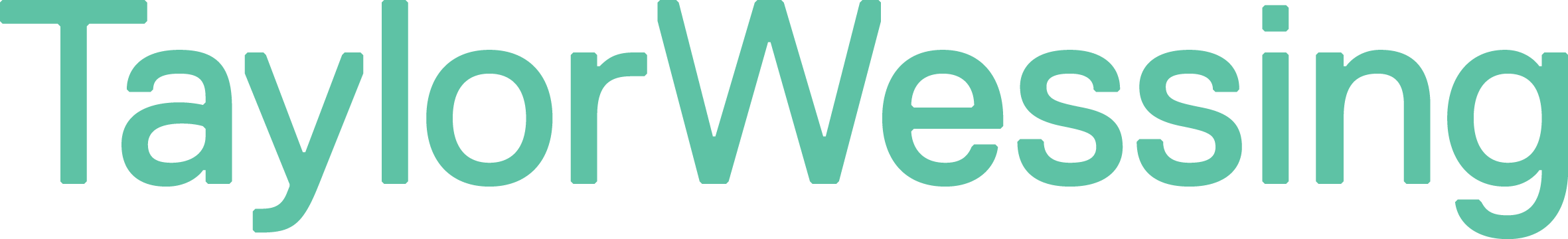
- Headquarters: Decentralised
- No. of offices: 16
- No. of attorneys: 700
- Key people: Oliver Bertram, Managing Partner and Global Co-Chair
- Revenue: £526.2 million globally F/Y: 2024/25
- Date founded: 2002
- Company type: Swiss verein
- Website: taylorwessing.com

Taylor Wessing LLP is an international law firm. The company was formed as a result of a merger of the British law firm Taylor Joynson Garrett and the German law firm Wessing & Berenberg-Gossler, retaining the first name of each.

== History ==
=== Taylor Joynson Garrett and its predecessors ===
The oldest predecessor of the Taylor law firm began in 1782 as a firm run by a sole practitioner, Thomas Smith. The first Taylor joined him as a partner in 1788. From 1805, the original Taylor then practised on his own until he died in 1822.

By then another partner, Jacob Mould had joined, and the firm continued under various names, usually incorporating the name "Taylor" until 1832 when the first Taylor's son (Taylor II) joined as a partner. The firm was then known as Mould Taylor & Co.

Mould departed shortly afterward and the firm became Parker, Taylor, and Rooke. From 1848, Taylor II practised on his own until 1866, when his son, Taylor III, joined him, the firm becoming known as R.S. Taylor & Son. He was joined by the first Humbert in 1879, the firm becoming R.S. Taylor Son & Humbert. This name was streamlined to Taylor & Humbert forty years later.

Taylor & Humbert merged with Parker Garrett in 1982, becoming Taylor Garrett. The firm then merged with Joynson-Hicks in 1989, calling itself Taylor Joynson Garrett.

=== Wessing & Berenberg-Gossler and its predecessors ===
Berenberg-Gossler coat of arms

In 1873, the oldest predecessor of the Wessing & Berenberg-Gossler law firm was founded in Hamburg by Hermann May and Alfons Mittelstrass. The firm was focused on corporate legal services catering to the Hanseatic merchants. This firm evolved into Berenberg-Gossler & Partner as its then-owner Günter von Berenberg-Gossler for the first time accepted multiple lawyers as partners in his firm in 1960. Berenberg-Gossler belonged to the Berenberg banking dynasty, owners of Berenberg Bank (formally Joh. Berenberg, Gossler & Co.).

Rüdiger Graf von der Goltz had established a law practice in Stettin in 1926, and in 1954, he accepted the young lawyer Kurt Wessing as a partner.

The law firm of Zimmermann, Reimer, Hohenlohe Sommer had been established in 1975, in Munich, and later became Zimmermann, Hohenlohe, Sommer, Rojahn.

In 1989, Berenberg-Gossler & Partner merged with Graf von der Goltz Wessing & Partner and Zimmermann Hohenlohe Sommer Rojahn. In 1993, the company merged with the Frankfurt law firm Kanzlei Lange & von Braunschweig, and became Wessing Berenberg-Gossler Zimmermann Lange (often known as Wessing & Berenberg-Gossler).

=== Taylor Wessing ===
In 2002, Taylor and Wessing & Berenberg-Gossler merged to become Taylor Wessing. In March 2012 RHT Law in Singapore formally joined Taylor Wessing (RHTLaw Taylor Wessing) and in May 2012 Austrian firm e|n|w|c merged, adding a further eight offices over six new jurisdictions. The firm has been using the name "Taylor" for over 230 years. In 2013, the firm was named Law Firm of the Year at The Lawyer Awards 2013.

In June 2014 two representative offices were opened in Palo Alto and New York City. An association with the Korean firm DR & AJU International Law Group was established in May 2014 extending Taylor Wessing's presence in Southeast Asia. In September 2015 two new offices were established in the Netherlands through a merger with Netherlands firm Deterink Advocaten en Notarissen. In 2016, the firm extended its presence in Hong Kong with the creation of a new local office and association with local firm HM Chan & Co. In 2018, Taylor Wessing opened a new office in Liverpool.

In December 2025, the company confirmed it was in discussions to merge with U.S. law firm Winston & Strawn. Scheduled to merge in May 2026, forming Winston Taylor, the firm's operations in the UK, Netherlands and Belgium will then exit its current Swiss verein structure.

As of 1 June 2026, Taylor Wessing focuses it's presence on 16 offices across 11 jurisdictions. The former verein members in the UK (including the branch in Dubai) and the Netherlands, together with their associated offices in Ireland and Belgium, now trade under the Winston Taylor brand. Under an extensive cooperation agreement, both firms will continue to work together closely.

== Sources ==
- The Legal 500
- Chambers and Partners
- Chambers Student Guide
