= Gwangju Hwajeong I-Park exterior wall collapse =

2022 building collapse in Gwangju, South Korea

- Date: 11 January 2022
- Location: Gwangju, South Korea
- Type: building collapse
- Deaths: 6
- Injuries: 0

On Wednesday, 11 January 2022 at 15:46 KST, the façade of a 39-story apartment building under construction collapsed in Gwangju, South Korea, killing six workers. HDC Hyundai Development Company was investigated by the government, and its chairman resigned.

In the initial collapse of the Hyundai I-Park apartment, ten construction workers were trapped by the debris. Searchers found three workers before they needed to halt operations for about 13 hours due to unsafe conditions. After a search that lasted 29 days, six bodies were recovered using drones and rescue dogs; five of the workers' bodies were recovered from the upper floors of the building, with one of the deceased being found on one of the lower floors. Rescue efforts had to be halted temporarily because an additional part of the building collapsed.

The South Korean government, under Moon Jae-In, launched the HDC Hyundai Industrial Development New Apartment Collapse Accident Investigation Committee to investigate the collapse. The results of the investigation were released on March 14, 2022. The committee determined that faulty construction methods and substandard building materials were responsible for the collapse. HDC made unauthorized changes to the 39th floor of Building 201, making the slab of the floor 35 cm thick instead of the originally proposed 15 cm.

HDC Hyundai Development Company, the developer of the I-Park apartment, was also implicated in the 2021 Gwangju building collapse; a building next to the road was being demolished and spilled over into the street. It landed on a bus, killing nine passengers.

== See also ==
- Ronan Point (1968)
- Sampoong Department Store collapse (1995)
- 2021 Gwangju building collapse (9 June)
- Surfside condominium collapse (24 June 2021)
