= East Asia Institute (Korea) =

Nonprofit think tank in Seoul, South Korea

The East Asia Institute (Korean: 동아시아연구원) is a non-profit independent, private think tank founded in 2002 with the stated mission of establishing a regional community based on democracy and a market economy. The chairman is Young-Sun Ha, an honorary professor from Seoul National University, and the president is Seoul National University Professor Chaesung Chun. The organisation is based in Seoul, South Korea. The institute's work focuses on interdisciplinary research in the social science fields. It is a member of the Council of Councils. It has created an archival website of publications related to North Korea.

The Think Tanks and Civil Societies Program (TTCSP) at the University of Pennsylvania ranked the East Asia Institute 89th in its 2017 worldwide ranking of think tanks.

== Research Centers ==
- Center for National Security Studies (국가안보연구센터)
- Center for China Studies (중국연구센터)
- Center for Japan Studies (일본연구센터)
- Center for North Korea Studies (북한연구센터)
- Center for Democracy Studies (민주주의연구센터)
- Center for Innovative Future Studies (미래혁신연구센터)
- Center for Trade, Technology, and Transformation (무역·기술·변환연구센터)

== Major Publications ==
=== Journal of East Asian Studies (JEAS) ===
The English-language journal Journal of East Asian Studies (JEAS) is published to foster and develop East Asian regional studies as an independent field of social science research. Founded in 2001, JEAS is published three times a year and has been published by the prestigious Cambridge University Press since 2016. Currently, the full content of JEAS can be subscribed to on the Cambridge University Press website, and the journal's Twitter account (@JEAS_journal) provides various contents to promote academic exchange among East Asian regional researchers and students, including promotional videos for published papers.

In 2023, Professor Thomas Pepinsky of Cornell University took on the role of Editor-in-Chief for the first time, and Professor Dimitar Gueorguiev of Syracuse University served as the Book Review Editor. In early 2023, discussions from a book review roundtable involving renowned international professors were published as a special edition. Additionally, several papers on critical topics in East Asian regional studies were submitted and reviewed for future special editions. In 2024, a special issue focusing on the international relations of the Republic of Korea was also published.

=== Global NK Video Commentary (북한과 세계) ===
The "North Korea and the World" series is planned and produced to provide in-depth analysis of North Korea's foreign policy, strategy, social issues, and international issues surrounding North Korea, while suggesting countermeasures for South Korea. Led by Park Won-gon, Director of the EAI North Korea Research Center, the series comprehensively examines North Korea-China, North Korea-Russia, North Korea-U.S., and inter-Korean relations, starting from the period following the breakdown of the 2019 Hanoi North Korea-U.S. Summit. Based on this, Director Park diagnoses North Korea's shift in its policy toward South Korea and unification, as well as its offensive foreign strategy, and provides analysis on contingencies and the possibility of war. Furthermore, the content focuses on complex predictions of major international conditions, such as the 2024 U.S. presidential election and changes in alliance systems, and proposes strategic response measures for the international community.

This video project, which began in the second half of 2023, releases new content every month and is produced in both Korean and English for domestic and international distribution. Thanks to these efforts, the "North Korea and the World" series has received steady interest from domestic and international academic and policy experts interested in North Korean studies and is evaluated to have contributed significantly to the growth of the EAI YouTube channel's subscriber count.

== Education ==
=== Academy ===
Every year, the "Seminar on Korean Politics for Future Generations" is held in the first half, and the "Seminar on the Future of Korean Diplomacy" is held in the second half. In the Seminar on Korean Politics for Future Generations, a faculty consisting of leading scholars in Korean political science and active politicians leads sessions to discuss reform tasks for Korean politics in major areas such as the constitution, power structure, political parties, election systems, judicialism, and local politics, providing a platform to derive future visions.

In the Seminar on the Future of Korean Diplomacy, future generations study key international political issues through seminars led by EAI Fellows and leading scholars in Korean international relations. Topics include the future of US-China competition and regional order, the North Korean economy and the future of the Korean Peninsula, changes in international security and economic order due to AI and other advanced technological innovations, and the outlook and strategies for the ecological environment including the climate crisis.

=== Sarangbang (사랑방) ===
Sarangbang offers a curriculum with Professor Emeritus Ha Young-sun of Seoul National University, involving weekly seminars, free discussions, and field trips. The records of these field trips are published as travelogues. Students selected for EAI Sarangbang read books across various eras and regions, learning basic background knowledge and theories to understand international politics and exploring various current issues through free and active discussion.

=== EAI Internship Program ===
The institute operates Intern Scholarship and Seasonal Internship programs.

Intern Scholarship are given opportunities to participate more actively in research activities. Through practical training programs, EAI Intern Scholars receive opportunities to participate in academic research, policy research, and educational programs. Recruitment and extensions are decided through evaluations each semester, and a prescribed scholarship is provided per semester. This scholarship, intended for living expenses, is provided each semester and can be supported for up to three years until university graduation.

Seasonal Internships are designed to educate students in related fields on how their academic studies can be applied in the actual field. The internship lasts for approximately 6–8 weeks, and EAI currently has internship agreements with Stanford University and Yonsei University Graduate School of International Studies (GSIS).

== Former Leadership ==
=== Chairperson ===
- Hong-koo Lee (2002~2012)
- Young-sun Ha (2012~)

=== President ===
- Byung-kook Kim (2002~2008)
- Sook-jong Lee (2008~2018)
- Yul Sohn (2018~2025)
- Chaesung Chun (2025~)
