= Jumunjin =

Town in Gangneung, South Korea

Coordinates: 37°53′N 128°50′E

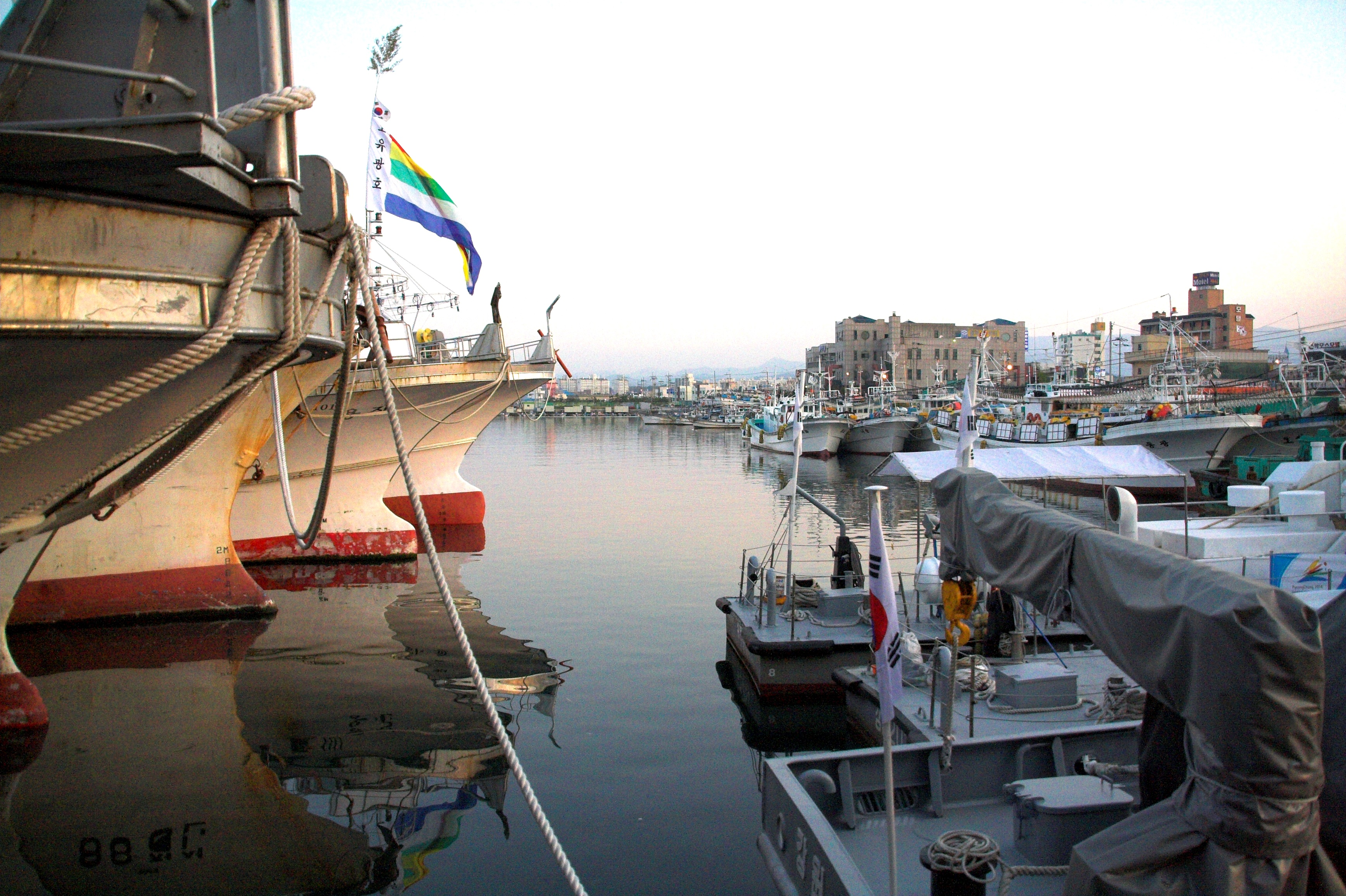
- Jumunjin Harbor

Korean name
- Hangul: 주문진읍
- Hanja: 注文津邑
- RR: Jumunjin-eup
- MR: Chumunjin-ŭp

Jumunjin is an eup (town) in northeastern Gangneung City. The population numbers about 20,600, or about 7,000 households. Roughly 10% of these are involved in fisheries and agriculture, respectively. Jumunjin is the site of Jumunjin Harbor, a significant fishing port on the Sea of Japan, home to 394 fishing vessels. Roughly 9.7 of the Jumunjin's 60.55 kilometers are devoted to agriculture.

The Jumunjin Beach Resort is a popular tourist destination. The Jumunjin landscape was used as a backdrop for the 2000 Korean movie Kilimanjaro.

== Administrative districts ==
Jumunjin was split from Yeongok-myeon in 1927 to form Jumunjin-myeon, which gained eup status in 1937. It presently comprises five ri (villages).

== Education ==
There are three elementary schools, one middle school, and two high schools in Jumunjin. These are all overseen by the Gangwon Office of Education, which reports to the provincial office in Chuncheon. In addition, Kangwon Provincial College is located in the eup.

== Sea area ==
Jumunjin port has been mainly used for anchoraging many ships, especially squid-fishing ships.

Jumunjin beach is the northernmost beach of Gangwon province. Additionally, its depth is quite shallower than other beaches in eastern coast of South Korea.

White sandy area and pines on the beach is like the emblem of Jumunjin. Physical parks and hotels are near the beach and accommodated places are widely available.

== See also ==
- Subdivisions of South Korea
- Geography of South Korea
