= Lee Hong-koo =

Prime Minister of South Korea from 1994 to 1995

His Excellency Lee Hong-koo
- 이홍구
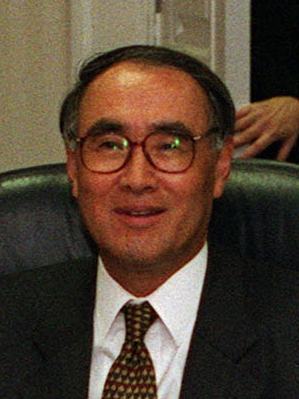
- Lee in 1999

28th Prime Minister of South Korea
- In office 17 December 1994 – 17 December 1995
- President: Kim Young-sam
- Preceded by: Lee Yung-dug
- Succeeded by: Lee Soo-sung

South Korean Ambassador to the United States
- In office 28 April 1998 – 1 August 2000
- President: Kim Dae-jung
- Preceded by: Park Kun-woo
- Succeeded by: Yang Sung-chul

South Korean Ambassador to the United Kingdom
- In office 1991–1993

Personal details
- Born: 9 May 1934 Gyeonggi Province, Korea, Empire of Japan
- Died: 5 May 2026 (aged 91)
- Education: Emory University (BA); Yale University (MA, PhD)
- Awards: Mugunghwa Order of Civil Merit Blue Dragon Order of Sport Merit; First Class Order of Service Merit (청조근정훈장) Grand Cordon of the Order of the Rising Sun

- Lee Hong-koo
- Hangul: 이홍구
- RR: I Honggu
- MR: I Honggu

Lee Hong-koo (Korean: 이홍구; 9 May 1934 – 5 May 2026) was a South Korean academic and politician who served as the 28th prime minister of South Korea from 1994 to 1995.

Lee Hong-koo also held office as South Korean ambassador to the United Kingdom and later to the United States, and was the founding chairman of the East Asia Institute in Seoul.

== Family and education ==
Lee Hong-koo's family name ("bongwan") originates with the Jeonju Yi clan, the family of the ruling dynasty of Korea from 1392 to 1910. He was the 15th generation descendant of Yi Jeon, Prince Yeongsan, who was the son of King Seongjong of Joseon.

Lee was born in what was then the designated village of Yeoyu-ri in the Koyang District of Gyeonggi Province, in Japanese Korea. Raised in Japanese Gyeongseong (Seoul), he graduated from the elite Gyeonggi High School in 1953 and entered Seoul National University to study law, but dropped out the following year. He then attended Emory University in the United States, graduating with a bachelor's degree in political science in 1959. He then earned a master's degree in 1961 and a Ph.D. in 1968 in political science from Yale University. He was awarded an honorary doctorate by Emory University in 1978.

== Academic career ==
Lee was an adjunct professor at Emory University in the United States from 1964 until 1968. A few years later, he returned to the United States, first as a fellow at the Woodrow Wilson International Center in 1973, then at Harvard Law School in 1974.

From 1968 or 1969 to 1973, Lee worked in Korea as a professor of political science at Seoul National University, and again served in this capacity after his return from Harvard in about 1974, until his appointment as a government minister in 1988.

== Political career ==
Following 33 years in academia, Lee Hong-Koo entered the world of politics and government in 1988, when he was appointed unification minister by president Roh Tae-Woo from 25 February 1988 to 27 December 1990.

In 1991 Lee was appointed as Korea's ambassador to the United Kingdom. After serving that ambassadorship for 3 years, from 30 April 1994 to 17 December 1994, Lee served as Deputy Prime Minister of South Korea, concurrently with again Minister of Unification, and from 17 December 1994 to 17 May 1995, Lee served as the 28th Prime Minister of South Korea under President Kim Young-sam. At this time, Lee was not a member of any party.

=== New Korea Party ===
In 1996, upon the advice of President Kim Young-sam, Lee formally entered the New Korea Party to run as a candidate for that party in the then-upcoming National Assembly elections.

The New Korea Party was a rebranded version of the coalition of conservative and moderate forces that had come together in 1990 with the mergers of Kim Young-sam's centrist Unification Democratic Party and Kim Jong-pil and Roh Tae-woo's conservative Democratic Justice Party, the latter being the clearest successor to the military-oriented regimes of the period from the 1960s to 1980s. The party's rebranding as "New Korea" came following the departure of Kim Jong-Pil's party from this coalition in 1995.

Lee was elected a member of the National Assembly in the April 1996 general election as the second name on the national party list for the New Korea Party. As Korea then had 47 seats to distribute on a proportional basis, the high slot that the party gave Lee guaranteed that he would enter the National Assembly. The New Korea Party won 139 of the 299 seats in the election.

=== Rapid political rise, presidential speculation ===
Lee rose quickly in the party in 1996, becoming a member of its Executive Committee, then party leader. At the time, he widely considered a possible successor to President Kim Young-Sam, whose term of office was to end in February 1998.

In 1995 and early 1996, Lee served as chairman of the World Cup Bidding Committee, which successfully lobbied for South Korea to co-host the World Cup in 2002.

In December 1996, after the government quickly forced through a revised labour law despite widespread opposition across the country, Lee resigned from his leadership position but remained in the party.

Following the onset of the 1997 Asian financial crisis, the opposition National Congress for New Politics candidate Kim Dae-Jung won the presidential election in December 1997 and took office in February 1998.

=== Ambassador to the United States ===
On 24 March 1998, President Kim Dae-jung nominated Lee to be the South Korean Ambassador to the United States. As Lee was serving in a top advisory capacity for the Grand National Party, the decision to appoint him was seen to signal a change in the nature of Korean politics. The Ministry of Foreign Affairs explained that the nomination of a relatively important official of the previous government "shows our intention to pursue bipartisan foreign policy." The concurrent nomination of Lee Soo-Sung, also a former prime minister under the previous government, as the executive vice chairman of the Advisory Council on Democratic and Peaceful Unification, the presidential advisory body on unification with North Korea, was seen to confirm this attitude.

Lee served as ambassador to the United States from May 1998 to August 2000, when he was replaced by Yang Sung-chul. His tenure coincided with the "Sunshine Policy", when improving inter-Korean relations led President Kim Dae-jung to become a serious contender for the Nobel Peace Prize, which he won in October 2000.

== Post-political career ==
Following his retirement from politics in 2000, Lee became active as a newspaper columnist and in the think tank and policy world, becoming a member of, among other organizations, the elite Club of Madrid of former heads of state and government, and a board member of the Seoul Forum.

=== East Asia Institute ===
In May 2002 Lee founded the East Asia Institute (Korean: 동아시아연구원) as an independent, non-profit, political and foreign policy think tank based in Seoul. By the 2010s, it consistently ranked in "the top 100 think tanks" among 6,000 around the world and its research and institutional model was benchmarked by nascent research institutions in developing countries.

Lee served as chair of the Institute's board for 10 years, retiring from the post in May 2012, and was succeeded by Ha Young-Sun.

== Election results ==
Year	Elections	Constituency	Political party	Votes (%)	Results
1996	15th National Assembly General Election	National (2nd)	NKP	6,783,730 (34.52%)	Elected

== Death ==
Lee died on 5 May 2026, at the age of 91.
