= 2021 Gwangju building collapse =

Building collapse in Gwangju, South Korea

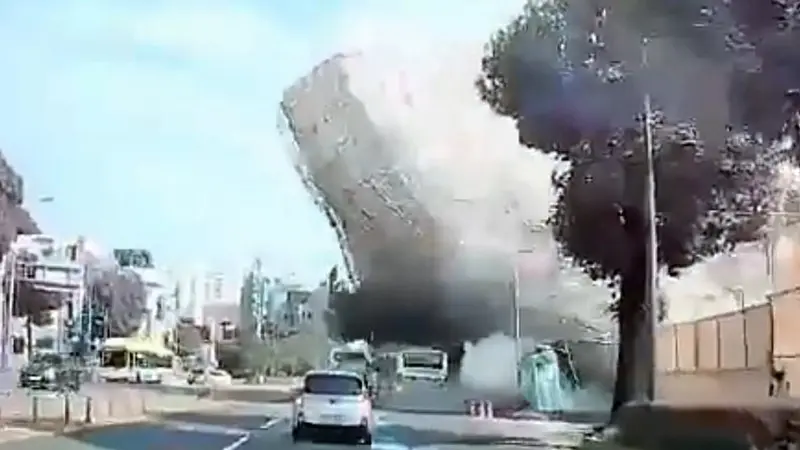
- Date: June 9, 2021; 5 years ago
- Time: 16:22 (KST)
- Location: Gwangju, South Korea; 35°08′04″N 126°55′38″E
- Cause: Demolition
- Deaths: 9
- Injuries: 8

On Wednesday, 9 June 2021 at 16:22 KST, a five-story building collapsed in Gwangju, South Korea during demolition, killing at least nine people and critically injuring eight. All of the casualties were passengers on a bus that was stopped at a station next to the building.

== Collapse ==
At 04:22 p.m. KST, a 5-story building was in the process of being demolished when a portion of the building collapsed onto a 7-lane road. The collapse buried a bus and two cars near a station next to the building under thousands of tonnes of rubble, and trapped dozens of passengers. All of the fatalities were bus passengers. The heap of rubble was 10 metres tall; rescuers used heavy machinery to comb through the wreckage. Nine people were found dead inside of the bus and eight others were critically injured.

The collapse occurred due to the demolition company starting on the middle floor.

== Investigation ==
In the immediate aftermath of the collapse, police charged four people with involuntary manslaughter. Three were workers from two different demolition companies and another was a supervisor from another company.

Police also probed whether a former member of an organized crime ring was overseeing the demolition of the building. On the 16th of June, police raided the headquarters of HDC Hyundai Development Company in Seoul to execute a search and seizure warrant ascertain whether the company was responsible for the disaster.

The person responsible for overseeing the demolition works was arrested at an airport after three months on the run.

== See also ==
- Sampoong Department Store collapse
- HDC Hyundai Development Company
- Surfside condominium collapse
- Gwangju Hwajeong I-Park exterior wall collapse
