= Choi Byung-ryeol =

South Korean politician (1938–2022)

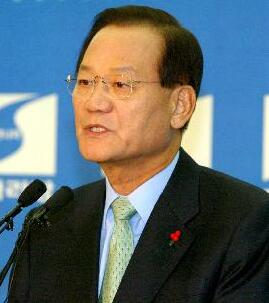

Mayor of Seoul
- In office November 3, 1994 – June 30, 1995
- Preceded by: Woo Myung-gyu
- Succeeded by: Cho Soon

Leader of the Grand National Party
- In office June 26, 2003 – March 23, 2004
- Preceded by: Park Hee-Tae (acting)
- Succeeded by: Park Geun-hye

Personal details
- Born: 16 September 1938 Sancheong, South Gyeongsang Province, South Korea
- Died: 2 December 2022 (aged 84) Seoul, South Korea
- Party: People Power (2020–2022); Independent (2004–2007); Liberty Korea (1997–2004, 2007–2020); New Korea (1990–1997); Democratic Justice (1985–1990)

Choi Byung-ryeol (Korean: 최병렬; Hanja: 崔秉烈; 16 September 1938 – 2 December 2022) was a South Korean politician and reporter who served as the last appointed mayor of Seoul from 1994 to 1995. After leaving office, Choi remained involved in politics as a member of the National Assembly, eventually becoming the leader of the Grand National Party.

== Life ==
Choi Byung-ryeol was born on 16 September 1938, in Sancheong, a county in South Gyeongsang Province.

He entered politics as a member of the Democratic Justice Party in 1985 after holding office as Editor-in-Chief of The Chosun Ilbo. Under President Roh Tae-woo, he was Chief of Political Affairs and Minister of Cultural and Public Information. From 1994 to 1995, Choi was the 29th Mayor of Seoul. He was succeeded by Cho Soon.

After leaving his position as mayor, Choi was elected as a member of the National Assembly three times in the 14th, 15th, and 16th general elections. He became the Leader of the Grand National Party in 2003.

Choi died on 2 December 2022, at the age of 84.

== Election results ==
Year	Elections	Constituency	Political party	Votes (%)	Results
1985	12th National Assembly General Election	National (34th)	DJP	7,040,811 (35.25%)	Elected
1992	14th National Assembly General Election	National (10th)	DLP	7,923,718 (38.49%)	Elected
1996	15th National Assembly General Election	Seocho A (Seoul)	NKP	40,191 (43.49%)	Won
2000	16th National Assembly General Election	Gangnam A (Seoul)	GNP	62,489 (56.46%)	Won

=== Local elections ===
==== Mayor of Seoul ====
Year	Elections	Constituency	Political party	Votes (%)	Remarks
1998	2nd Iocal Election	Seoul (Mayoral Elections)	GNP	1,512,854 (43.99%)	Defeated (2nd)
