= Lee Soo-sung =

South Korean politician (born 1939)

- 이수성
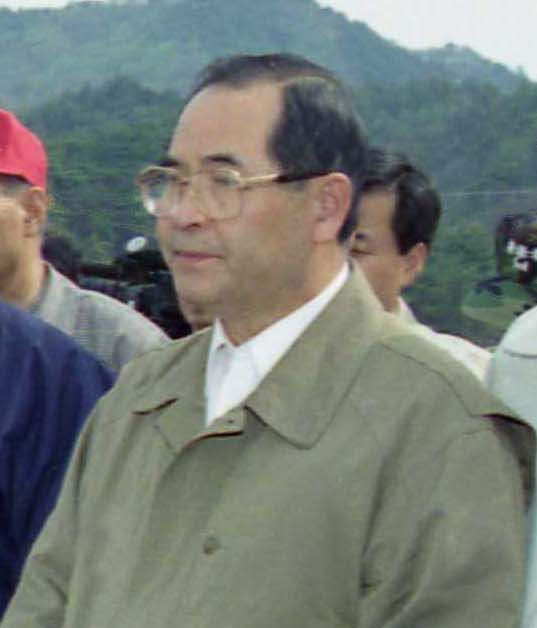

29th Prime Minister of South Korea
- In office 18 December 1995 – 4 March 1997
- President: Kim Young-sam
- Preceded by: Lee Hong-koo
- Succeeded by: Goh Kun

Personal details
- Born: 10 March 1939 (age 87) Kankō, Kankyōnan Province, Korea, Empire of Japan
- Education: Seoul National University (PhD, LLD)
- Occupation: Politician, Jurist

Korean name
- Hangul: 이수성
- Hanja: 李壽成
- RR: I Suseong
- MR: I Susŏng

Lee Soo-sung (Korean: 이수성; born 10 March 1939) is a South Korean politician and legal scholar who served as the prime minister of South Korea from 1995 to 1997 under President Kim Young-sam. Prior to entering politics, he was the president of Seoul National University.

He later served as the executive vice chairman of the Advisory Council on Democratic and Peaceful Unification, the presidential advisory body on unification with North Korea.

== Biography ==
He was born in Hamhung, Kankyōnan Province, Korea, Empire of Japan studied and graduated with a law degree going on to become a judge and following tenure as a lawyer went on become Associate Justice. During the Korean War he was abducted into North Korea.

Lee Soo-sung enrolled into the Law School of Seoul National University in 1956 following graduation from Seoul High School. He received his Ph.D. degree in 1961 and also received LL.D. from the same university.

His teaching experiences include various positions such as full-time lecturer, assistant professor, associate professor during 1967–1978, exchange researcher at University of Pittsburgh in the USA for 1970–1971 and the Dean of School of Law at the Seoul National University during 1988~1990. He was then appointed to the post of the 20th President of the Seoul National University in 1995 while he was teaching as a professor at the same university. He was also appointed as the board chairman of the Samsung Press Foundation and as the Prime Minister of Korea by Kim Young-sam Administration in December of the same year. Accordingly, he resigned his post as the President of the Seoul National University.

Following his resignation as the Prime Minister in 1997, he ran for the primary election of the presidential candidate of the New Korea Party but lost the election. In 2000, he founded Democratic National Party along with Kim, Yoon Hwan and Lee, Gi Taek, and ran for the 16th general election without success. During the period of 1998–2000 under Kim Dae-Jung Administration, he was actively involved in international activities including executive vice-chairman of the National Unification Advisory Council of Korea.

Although he initially ran for the 17th Presidential Election in 2007, he voluntarily withdrew his candidacy for the purpose of unification of candidate for the ruling party and maintained neutrality in election. In the Presidential Election in 2012, he supported the presidential candidate of the Democratic United Party, Moon Jae-in.

Political offices
Preceded by Lee Hong-koo	Prime Minister of South Korea; 1995–1997	Succeeded by Goh Kun
