= List of Olympic torch relays =

The Olympic torch relay is the ceremonial relaying of the Olympic flame from Olympia, Greece, to the site of an Olympic Games. It was introduced at the 1936 Summer Olympics in Berlin, as a way for Adolf Hitler to highlight the Nazi claim of Aryan connections of Germany to Greece. It has taken place prior to every Games since.

Although in the past some Olympic organizing committees organized torch relays which encompassed multiple countries, the International Olympic Committee now restricts international relays due to the protests during the 2008 Summer Olympics torch relay, in which the relay was met with protests at several international sites on its way to Beijing.

== Summer Olympic Games ==
Site of the Olympic Games	Days	Total length (in km)	Total number of torchbearers	Route
(Nazi Germany) Berlin 1936	8	3,422	3,422	Main article: 1936 Summer Olympics torch relay Olympia – Athens – Thessaloniki (Greece) – Sofia (Bulgaria) – Belgrade (Yugoslavia) – Budapest (Hungary) – Vienna (Austria) – Prague (Czechoslovakia) – Dresden – Berlin (Germany) Two secondary relays carried the flame from Olympic Stadium in Berlin to the off-site aquatic venues: Grunau (for the rowing course), and Kiel (yachting). The cauldron in Kiel sat in an old Hanseatic galley in the bay. Kiel would also be the yachting site of the 1972 Munich Olympics.
(Japan) / (Finland) Cancelled 1940 Games				Main article: 1940 Summer Olympics torch relay
(United Kingdom) Cancelled 1944 Games				
(United Kingdom) London 1948	13	7,870	3,372	Main article: 1948 Summer Olympics torch relay Olympia – Corfu (Greece) (by ship) Bari – Milan (Italy) – Lausanne – Geneva (Switzerland) – Besançon – Metz (France) – Luxembourg (Luxembourg) – Brussels (Belgium) – Lille – Calais (France) (by ship)– Dover – London (Great Britain) A second relay carried the flame from Wembley, where the Games were based, to the sailing centre at Torbay, via Slough, Basingstoke, Salisbury, and Exeter.
(Finland) Helsinki 1952	5	3,365	1,416	Main article: 1952 Summer Olympics torch relay Olympia - Athens (Greece) (by airplane) Aalborg - Odense - Copenhagen (Denmark) (by ship) Malmö - Gothenburg - Stockholm (Sweden) - Tornio - Oulu - Helsinki (Finland). A second flame was lit in Pallastunturi (Finland) and joined the main one in Tornio
(Australia) Melbourne 1956	21	20,470	3,118	Olympia - Athens (Greece) (by airplane) Darwin - Brisbane - Sydney - Canberra - Melbourne (Australia)
(Sweden) Stockholm 1956 (equestrian Games)	9	1,000	490	Olympia - Athens (Greece) (by airplane) Copenhagen (Denmark) (by ship) Malmö - Stockholm (Sweden)
(Italy) Rome 1960	14	2,750	1,529	Olympia - Athens (Greece) (by ship) Syracuse - Catania - Messina - Reggio Calabria - Naples - Rome (Italy)
(Japan) Tokyo 1964	51	20,065	870	Olympia - Athens (Greece) (by airplane) Istanbul (Turkey) - Beirut (Lebanon) - Tehran (Iran) - Lahore (Pakistan) - New Delhi (India) - Rangoon (Burma) - Bangkok (Thailand) - Kuala Lumpur (Malaysia) - Manila (Philippines) - Hong Kong (Hong Kong) - Taipei (Taiwan) - Okinawa - Tokyo (Japan, following four different routes)
Mexico City 1968	51	13,620	2,778	Main article: 1968 Summer Olympics torch relay Olympia - Athens (Greece) (by ship) Genoa (Italy) (by ship) Barcelona - Madrid - Seville - Palos (by ship) Las Palmas (Spain) - San Salvador Island (Bahamas) - Veracruz - Mexico City (Mexico)
(West Germany) Munich 1972	30	5,532	6,000	Olympia - Athens - Thessaloniki (Greece) - Istanbul (Turkey) - Varna (Bulgaria) - Bucharest - Timișoara (Romania) - Belgrade (Yugoslavia) - Budapest (Hungary) - Vienna - Linz - Salzburg - Innsbruck (Austria) - Garmisch-Partenkirchen - Munich (West Germany)
(Canada) Montreal 1976	5	775	1,214	Main article: 1976 Summer Olympics torch relay Olympia - Athens (Greece) (satellite transmission of an electronic pulse) Ottawa (Ontario) - Montreal (Quebec) (Canada)
(Soviet Union) Moscow 1980	31	4,915	5,000	Main article: 1980 Summer Olympics torch relay Olympia - Athens - Thessaloniki (Greece) - Sofia (Bulgaria) - Bucharest (Romania) - Kishinev - Vinnytsia - Kiev - Tula - Moscow (USSR)
(United States) Los Angeles 1984	83	15,000	3,636	Main article: 1984 Summer Olympics torch relay Olympia - Athens (Greece) (by airplane) New York – Boston – Philadelphia – Washington – Detroit – Chicago – Indianapolis – Atlanta – St. Louis – Dallas – Denver – Salt Lake City – Seattle – San Francisco – San Diego - Los Angeles (USA)
(South Korea) Seoul 1988	26	15,250	1,467	Main article: 1988 Summer Olympics torch relay Olympia - Athens (Greece) (by airplane) Jeju - Busan - Seoul (South Korea)
(Spain) Barcelona 1992	51	6,307	10,448	Main article: 1992 Summer Olympics torch relay Olympia - Athens (Greece) (by ship) Empúries - Bilbao - A Coruña - Madrid - Seville (by airplane) Las Palmas - Málaga - Valencia (by ship) Palma de Mallorca – Barcelona (Spain)
(United States) Atlanta 1996	112	29,016	13,267	Main article: 1996 Summer Olympics torch relay Olympia - Athens (Greece) (by airplane) Los Angeles (California) – Las Vegas (Nevada) – San Francisco (California) – Seattle (Washington) – Salt Lake City (Utah) – Denver (Colorado) – Dallas (Texas) – St. Louis (Missouri) – Minneapolis (Minnesota) – Chicago (Illinois) – Detroit (Michigan) - Boston (Massachusetts) – New York (New York) – Philadelphia (Pennsylvania) – Washington – Miami (Florida) – Birmingham (Alabama) - Atlanta (Georgia) (USA)
(Australia) Sydney 2000	127	27,000	13,300	Main article: 2000 Summer Olympics torch relay Olympia - Athens (Greece) (by airplane) Guam - Palau - Federated States of Micronesia - Nauru - Solomon Islands - Papua New Guinea - Vanuatu - Samoa - American Samoa - Cook Islands - Tonga - Queenstown - Christchurch - Wellington - Rotorua - Auckland (New Zealand) - Uluru (Northern Territory) - Brisbane (Queensland) - Darwin (Northern Territory) - Perth (Western Australia) - Adelaide (South Australia) - Melbourne (Victoria) - Canberra (Capital Territory) - Sydney (New South Wales) (Australia)
(Greece) Athens 2004	142	86,000	11,360	Main article: 2004 Summer Olympics torch relay Olympia - Marathonas - Athens (Greece) (by airplane) Sydney - Melbourne (Australia) - Tokyo (Japan) - Seoul (South Korea) - Beijing (People's Republic of China) - Delhi (India) - Cairo (Egypt) - Cape Town (South Africa) - Rio de Janeiro (Brazil) - Mexico City (Mexico) - Los Angeles - St. Louis - Atlanta - New York (USA) - Montreal (Canada) - Antwerp - Brussels (Belgium) - Amsterdam (Netherlands) - Lausanne - Geneva (Switzerland) - Paris (France) - London (Great Britain) - Madrid - Barcelona (Spain) - Rome (Italy) - Munich - Berlin (Germany) - Stockholm (Sweden) - Helsinki (Finland) - Moscow (Russia) - Kyiv (Ukraine) - Istanbul (Turkey) - Sofia (Bulgaria) - Nicosia (Cyprus) - Iraklion - Thessaloniki - Patras - Athens (Greece)
(China) Beijing 2008	130	137,000	21,880	Main article: 2008 Summer Olympics torch relay Olympia - Athens (Greece) (by airplane) - Beijing (People's Republic of China) (by airplane) - Almaty (Kazakhstan) (by airplane) - Istanbul (Turkey) (by airplane) - Saint Petersburg (Russia) (by airplane) - London (Great Britain) (by airplane) – Paris (France) (by airplane) – San Francisco (USA) (by airplane) – Buenos Aires (Argentina) (by airplane) – Dar es Salaam (Tanzania) (by airplane) – Muscat (Oman) (by airplane) – Islamabad (Pakistan) (by airplane) – New Delhi (India) (by airplane) – Bangkok (Thailand) (by airplane) – Kuala Lumpur (Malaysia) (by airplane) – Jakarta (Indonesia) (by airplane) – Canberra (Australia) (by airplane) – Nagano (Japan) (by airplane) – Seoul (South Korea) (by airplane) – Pyongyang (North Korea) (by airplane) – Ho Chi Minh City (Vietnam) (by airplane) – Hong Kong (Hong Kong, China) (by ship) – Macau (Macau, China) (by airplane) – Sanya - Wuzhishan - Wanning - Haikou (Hainan) (by airplane) – Guangzhou - Shenzhen - Huizhou - Shantou (Guangdong) (by airplane) – Fuzhou - Quanzhou - Xiamen - Longyan (Fujian) (by airplane) – Ruijin - Jinggangshan - Nanchang (Jiangxi) (by airplane) – Wenzhou - Shaoxing - Hangzhou - Ningbo - Jiaxing (Zhejiang) (by airplane) – Shanghai (by airplane) – Suzhou - Nantong - Taizhou - Yangzhou - Nanjing (Jiangsu) (by airplane) – Hefei - Huainan - Wuhu - Jixi - Huangshan (Anhui) (by airplane) – Wuhan - Yichang - Jingzhou (Hubei) (by airplane) – Yueyang - Changsha - Shaoshan (Hunan) (by airplane) – Guilin - Nanning - Baise (Guangxi) (by airplane) – Kunming - Lijiang - Shangri-La (Yunnan) (by airplane) – Guiyang - Kaili - Zunyi (Guizhou) (by airplane) – Chongqing (by airplane) – Ürümqi - Kashgar - Shihezi - Changji (Xinjiang) (by airplane) – Lhasa (Tibet) (by airplane) – Golmud - Qinghai Lake - Xining (Qinghai) (by airplane) – Yuncheng - Pingyao - Taiyuan - Datong (Shanxi) (by airplane) – Jiuquan (by airplane) – Zhongwei - Wuzhong - Yinchuan (Ningxia) (by airplane) – Yan'an - Yangling - Xianyang - Xi'an (Shaanxi) (by airplane) – Dunhuang - Jiayuguan - Lanzhou (Gansu) (by airplane) – Hohhot - Ordos - Baotou - Chifeng (Inner Mongolia) (by airplane) – Harbin - Daqing - Qiqihar (Heilongjiang) (by airplane) – Changchun - Songyuan - Jilin - Yanji (Jilin) (by airplane) – Shenyang - Anshan - Dalian (Liaoning) (by airplane) –Qingdao - Linyi - Qufu - Tai'an - Jinan (Shandong) (by airplane) – Zhengzhou - Kaifeng - Luoyang - Anyang (Henan) (by airplane) – Shijiazhuang - Qinhuangdao - Tangshan (Hebei) (by airplane) – Tianjin (by airplane) – Guang'an - Leshan - Chengdu (Sichuan) (by airplane) – Beijing (People's Republic of China) Sichuan route postponed to the end due to earthquake.
(United Kingdom) London 2012	70	12,800	8,000	Main article: 2012 Summer Olympics torch relay Olympia - Athens (Greece) (by aeroplane) - Land's End - Plymouth - Exeter - Taunton - Bristol - Cheltenham - Worcester - Malvern (England) (by train) - Cardiff - Swansea - Aberystwyth - Bangor (Wales) (by train) - Chester - Stoke-on-Trent - Bolton - Liverpool (England) (by ship) - Douglas (Isle of Man) (by ship) - Portrush - Derry - Newry (Northern Ireland) (by airplane) - Dublin (Republic of Ireland) (by airplane) - Belfast (Northern Ireland) (by airplane) - Glasgow - Inverness - Kirkwall - Lerwick - Stornoway - Aberdeen - Dundee - Edinburgh (Scotland) (by train) - Alnwick - Newcastle - Durham - Middlesbrough - Hull - York - Carlisle - Bowness-on-Windermere - Blackpool - Manchester - Leeds - Sheffield - Cleethorpes - Lincoln - Nottingham - Derby - Birmingham - Coventry - Leicester - Peterborough - Norwich - Ipswich - Chelmsford - Cambridge - Luton - Oxford - Reading - Basingstoke - Winchester - Salisbury - Weymouth and Portland - Bournemouth - Southampton (England) (by ship) - Saint Peter Port (Guernsey) (by ship) - Saint Helier (Jersey) (by ship) - Portsmouth - Brighton and Hove - Brighton - Hastings - Dover - Maidstone - Guildford - London (England) (Great Britain)
(Brazil) Rio de Janeiro 2016	106	20,000	12,000	Main article: 2016 Summer Olympics torch relay Olympia - Athens (Greece) (by airplane) - Lausanne - Geneva (Switzerland) (by airplane) - Brasília (Federal District) - Goiânia (Goiás) - Belo Horizonte (Minas Gerais) - Vitória (Espírito Santo) - Salvador (Bahia) - Aracaju (Sergipe) - Maceió (Alagoas) - Recife (Pernambuco) - João Pessoa (Paraíba) - Natal (Rio Grande do Norte) - Fernando de Noronha - Fortaleza (Ceará) - Teresina (Piauí) - Palmas (Tocantins) - São Luís (Maranhão) - Belém (Para) - Macapá (Amapá) - Boa Vista (Roraima) - Manaus (Amazonas) - Rio Branco (Acre) - Porto Velho (Rondônia) - Cuiabá (Mato Grosso) - Campo Grande (Mato Grosso do Sul) - Porto Alegre (Rio Grande do Sul) - Florianópolis (Santa Catarina) - Curitiba (Paraná) - São Paulo (São Paulo) - Rio de Janeiro (Rio de Janeiro) (Brazil)
(Japan) Tokyo 2020	111	20,000	-	Main article: 2020 Summer Olympics torch relay Olympia (Greece) - Athens (Greece) (by airplane) - Fukushima (Fukushima) - Utsunomiya (Tochigi) - Maebashi (Gunma) - Nagano (Nagano) - Gifu (Gifu) - Nagoya (Aichi) – Nara (Nara) – Osaka (Osaka) – Kōchi (Kōchi) – Matsuyama (Ehime) – Kagoshima (Kagoshima) – Naha (Okinawa) – Nagasaki (Nagasaki) – Fukuoka (Fukuoka) – Hiroshima (Hiroshima) – Kobe (Hyōgo) – Kyoto (Kyoto) – Fukui (Fukui) – Kanazawa (Ishikawa) – Yamagata (Yamagata) – Akita (Akita) – Sapporo (Hokkaido) – Morioka (Iwate) – Sendai (Miyagi) – Shizuoka (Shizuoka) – Yokohama (Kanagawa) – Chiba (Chiba) – Saitama (Saitama) – Tokyo (Japan) Irregular period, relay in Greece started on 12 March 2020 in Ancient Olympia, then curtailed in Sparta the next day, and later finished in Athens without spectators on 19 March 2020, the relay went later suspended on 25 March 2020 due to the COVID-19 pandemic after the Olympics postponed to 2021. Japan relay started on 25 March 2021 in Naraha and ended on 23 July 2021 during the opening ceremony.
(France) Paris 2024	79	-	10,000	Main article: 2024 Summer Olympics torch relay Olympia (Greece) – Marseille (by ship) (Provence-Alpes-Côte d'Azur) – Montpellier (Occitania) – Bastia (Corsica) – Toulouse (Occitania) – Bordeaux (Nouvelle-Aquitaine) – Châteauroux (Centre-Val de Loire) – Caen (Normandy) – Rennes (Brittany) – Niort (Nouvelle–Aquitaine) – La Baule (Pays de la Loire) – Brest (Brittany) (France) – Cayenne (French Guiana) – Nouméa (New Caledonia) – Saint-Denis (Réunion) – Papeete (French Polynesia) – Baie-Mahault (Guadeloupe) – Fort-de-France (Martinique) – Nice (Provence-Alpes-Côte d'Azur) – Avignon – Vichy (Auvergne-Rhône-Alpes) – Chamonix – Besançon (Bourgogne-Franche-Comté) – Strasbourg (Grand Est) – Lille (Hauts-de-France) – Le Havre (Normandy) – Orléans (Centre-Val de Loire) – Dijon (Bourgogne-Franche-Comté) – Troyes (Grand Est) – Paris (Île-de-France) – Beauvais (Hauts-de-France) – Évry-Courcouronnes (Île-de-France) – Versailles – Nanterre – Paris (France)
(United States) Los Angeles 2028	-	-	-	Olympia (Greece) – Atlanta – Los Angeles (USA)
(Australia) Brisbane 2032	-	-	-	Olympia (Greece) – Brisbane (Australia)

== Winter Olympic Games ==
Site of the Olympic Games	Days	Total length (in km)	Total number of torchbearers	Route
(Norway) Oslo 1952	2	225	94	Main article: 1952 Winter Olympics torch relay Morgedal – Oslo (Norway)
(Italy) Cortina d'Ampezzo 1956	5			Rome - Venice – Cortina d'Ampezzo (Italy)
(United States) Squaw Valley 1960	19	960	700	Morgedal – Oslo (Norway) (by airplane) - Los Angeles – Fresno – Squaw Valley (USA)
(Austria) Innsbruck 1964	8			Olympia – Athens (Greece) (by airplane) Vienna – Innsbruck (Austria)
(France) Grenoble 1968	50	7,222	5,000	Olympia – Athens (Greece) (by airplane) Paris – Strasbourg – Lyon – Bordeaux – Toulouse – Marseille – Nice – Chamonix – Grenoble (France)
(Japan) Sapporo 1972	38	18,741	16,300	Olympia – Athens (Greece) (by airplane) Okinawa (by airplane) Tokyo – Sapporo (Japan)
(Austria) Innsbruck 1976	6	1,618		Olympia – Athens (Greece) (by airplane) Vienna (route nr. 1) Linz – Salzburg – Innsbruck (route nr. 2) Graz – Klagenfurt – Innsbruck (Austria)
(United States) Lake Placid 1980	15	12,824	52	Olympia – Athens (Greece) (by airplane) Shannon (Ireland) Langley Air Force Base, Hampton – Washington – Baltimore – Philadelphia – New York – Albany – Lake Placid (USA)
(Socialist Federal Republic of Yugoslavia) Sarajevo 1984	11	5,289	1,600	Olympia – Athens (Greece) (by airplane) Dubrovnik (route nr. 1) Split – Ljubljana – Zagreb - Sarajevo (route nr. 2) Skopje – Novi Sad – Belgrade – Sarajevo (Yugoslavia)
(Canada) Calgary 1988	95	18,000	6,250	Main article: 1988 Winter Olympics torch relay Olympia – Athens (Greece) (by airplane) St. John’s, Newfoundland – Québec City – Montreal – Ottawa – Toronto – Winnipeg – Inuvik – Vancouver – Edmonton – Calgary (Canada)
(France) Albertville 1992	58	5,500	5,500	Main article: 1992 Winter Olympics torch relay Olympia – Athens (Greece) (on Concorde) Paris – Nantes – Le Havre – Lille – Strasbourg – Limoges – Bordeaux – Toulouse – Ajaccio – Nice – Marseille – Lyon – Grenoble – Albertville (France)
(Norway) Lillehammer 1994	82 (Note: For the 1994 Lillehammer Games, the flame for the national torch relay was lit at Sondre Norheim's birthplace in Morgedal, where the official 1952 & 1960 flames were lit in the same manner. The original plan to merge it with the official Olympia flame at Oslo was abandoned due to Greek opposition; only the official flame was used in the opening ceremony. All statistics are for the national torch relay only. The Morgedal flame was maintained and later used at the 1994 Winter Paralympics.)	12,000	7,000	Main article: 1994 Winter Olympics torch relay Olympia – Athens (Greece) (mainly by airplane: Frankfurt – Stuttgart – Karlsruhe – Düsseldorf – Cologne – Hamburg (Germany) – Copenhagen (Denmark)-– Helsinki (Finland) – Stockholm (Sweden) ) – Oslo – Lillehammer (Norway) (National torch relay: Morgedal – Kristiansand – Stavanger – Bergen – Gullfaks – Bergen – Trondheim – Tromsø – Svalbard – Tromsø – Bodø – Oslo – Lillehammer (Norway) )
(Japan) Nagano 1998	51	3,486	6,901	Main article: 1998 Winter Olympics torch relay Olympia – Athens (Greece) (by airplane) Tokyo (route nr. 1) Hokkaidō – Chiba – Tokyo – Nagano (route nr. 2) Okinawa – Hiroshima – Kyoto – Nagano (route nr. 3) Kagoshima – Osaka – Shizuoka – Nagano (Japan)
(United States) Salt Lake City 2002	85	21,275	12,012	Main article: 2002 Winter Olympics torch relay Olympia – Athens (Greece) (by airplane) Atlanta – Charleston, South Carolina - Jacksonville, Florida - St. Augustine, Florida – Orlando, Florida - Miami – Mobile, Alabama – Biloxi, Mississippi – New Orleans - Houston – San Antonio – Austin, Texas - Dallas – Little Rock, Arkansas - Memphis - Nashville, Tennessee – Louisville, Kentucky – Cincinnati– Pittsburgh – Cumberland, Maryland – Washington, D.C. – Baltimore – Philadelphia – New York - Hartford, Connecticut – Providence, Rhode Island - Boston – Burlington, Vermont - Lake Placid – Syracuse - Cleveland - Columbus, Ohio – Chicago – Milwaukee - Detroit – Fort Wayne, Indiana – Indianapolis – Lexington – St. Louis - Kansas City – Omaha – Wichita - Oklahoma City – Amarillo - Albuquerque - Phoenix – Los Angeles – San Francisco – Squaw Valley – Reno – Portland – Seattle – Juneau – Boise – Bozeman – Cheyenne – Denver – Salt Lake City (USA)
(Italy) Turin 2006	75	11,300	10,000	Main article: 2006 Winter Olympics torch relay Olympia – Athens (Greece) (by airplane) Rome – Florence – Genoa – Cagliari - Valletta (Malta) – Palermo – Naples – Bari – Ancona – San Marino (San Marino) – Bologna – Venice – Trieste - Koper (Slovenia) - Klagenfurt (Austria) - Trento – Cortina d'Ampezzo – Milan - Lugano (Switzerland) - Bardonecchia – Albertville (France) - Turin
(Canada) Vancouver 2010	106	45,000+	12,000+	Main article: 2010 Winter Olympics torch relay Olympia – Athens (Greece) (by airplane) Victoria, British Columbia – Yukon – Northwest Territories – Alberta – Saskatchewan – Manitoba – Nunavut – Quebec – Newfoundland and Labrador – Nova Scotia – Prince Edward Island – New Brunswick – Quebec – Ontario – Manitoba – Saskatchewan – Alberta (Canada) – Washington (USA) – Vancouver (Canada)
(Russia) Sochi 2014	123	65,000	14,000+	Main article: 2014 Winter Olympics torch relay Olympia – Amaliada - Elis - Pyrgos - Zacharo - Kalo Nero - Tripoli - Levidi - Lefkasi - Kalavryta - Patras - Rio - Missolonghi - Agrinio - Karpenisi - Lamia - Volos - Larissa - Katerini - Thessaloniki - Giannitsa - Naousa - Edessa - Florina - Kastoria - Grevena - Ioannina - Kalabaka - Trikala - Karditsa - Lamia - Amfissa - Delphi - Arachova - Livadeia - Athens (Greece) (by airplane) - Moscow - Kolomna - Odintsovo - Arkhangelskoye - Krasnogorsk - Dmitrov - Saint Petersburg – Kaliningrad – Murmansk – Arkhangelsk – Yakutsk – Vladivostok – Irkutsk – Novosibirsk – Kazan – Nizhny Novgorod – Volgograd – Rostov-on-Don – Astrakhan – Grozny – Sochi (Russia)
(South Korea) Pyeongchang 2018	101	2,018	7,500	Main article: 2018 Winter Olympics torch relay Olympia – Athens (Greece) (by airplane) - Incheon (by airplane) – Jeju (by airplane) – Busan – Ulsan – Geoje - Tongyeong (by ship) - Changwon - Changnyeong - Sacheon (South Gyeongsang) – Yeosu - Suncheon - Gangjin (by helicopter) - Mokpo - Damyang - Gokseong (South Jeolla) – Muju - Jeonju (North Jeolla) – Buyeo (South Chungcheong) – Daejeon – Sejong – Osong – Jincheon - Chungju - Danyang (North Chungcheong) – Bonghwa - Andong (North Gyeongsang) – Daegu – Pohang (North Gyeongsang) – Suwon (Gyeonggi) – Seoul – Paju - Yeoncheon (Gyeonggi) (by bike) – Hwacheon (by bike) - Goseong - Hwacheon - Hwacheon - Hoengseong - Samcheok - Jeongseon - Pyeongchang (Gangwon) (South Korea)
(China) Beijing 2022	3	70	1.200	Main article: 2022 Winter Olympics torch relay Olympia – Athens (Greece) (by airplane) - Beijing - Zhangjiakou - Yanqing District - Beijing (China)
(Italy) Milano Cortina 2026	63	12,000	10,001	Main article: 2026 Winter Olympics torch relay Olympia – Athens (Greece) (by airplane) Rome – Viterbo – Terni – Perugia – Siena – Florence – Livorno – Nuoro – Cagliari – Palermo – Syracuse – Catania – Reggio Calabria – Catanzaro – Salerno – Pompei – Naples – Latina – Benevento – Potenza – Taranto – Lecce – Bari – Campobasso – Pescara – L'Aquila – Ancona – Rimini – Bologna – Ferrara – Parma – Genoa – Cuneo – Turin – Aosta – Novara – Varese – Pavia – Piacenza – Brescia – Verona – Mantua – Vicenza – Padua – Venice – Trieste – Udine – Belluno – Cortina d'Ampezzo – Bolzano – Cavalese – Trento – Livigno – Sondrio – Lecco – Bergamo – Como – Monza – Milan (Italy)

== Youth Summer Olympic Games ==
Site of the Olympic Games	Days	Total length (in km)	Total number of torchbearers	Route
Singapore 2010	22	26,700+	2,400+	Main article: 2010 Summer Youth Olympics torch relay Olympia (Greece) – Berlin (Germany) - Dakar (Senegal) - Mexico City (Mexico) - Auckland (New Zealand) - Seoul (South Korea) - Singapore
(China) Nanjing 2014	108		104	Main article: 2014 Summer Youth Olympics torch relay Athens (Greece) - 258 different online locations from the 204 participating NOCs - Nanjing (People's Republic of China)
(Argentina) Buenos Aires 2018	63	14,000	-	Athens (Greece) - La Plata (Buenos Aires) - Parana (Entre Rios) - Santa Fe (Santa Fe) - Iguazu (Misiones) - Corrientes (Corrientes) - Jujuy (Jujuy) - Salta (Salta) - Tucuman (Tucuman) - Catamarca (Catamarca) - La Rioja (La Rioja) - Mendoza (Mendoza) - San Juan (San Juan) - Cordoba (Cordoba) - Neuquen (Neuquen) - Bariloche (Rio Negro) - Ushuaia (Tierra del Fuego) - Buenos Aires (Federal Capital) (Argentina)
(Senegal) Dakar 2026	46	3,600	400+	Athens (Greece) - Dakar - Thiès - Louga - Saint-Louis - Matam - Diourbel - Fatick - Kaolack - Kaffrine - Tambacounda - Kédougou - Kolda - Sédhiou - Ziguinchor - Saly - Rufisque - Dakar (Senegal)

== Youth Winter Olympic Games ==
Site of the Olympic Games	Days	Total length (in km)	Total number of torchbearers	Route
(Austria) Innsbruck 2012	18	3,573	2,012	Athens (Greece) - Innsbruck - Bregenz - St. Anton am Arlberg - Lienz - Klagenfurt - Semmering - Wien - Graz - Eisenstadt - St. Pölten - Linz - Salzburg - Schladming - Seefeld in Tirol - Kühtai - Kufstein - Innsbruck (Austria)
(Norway) Lillehammer 2016	74	-	-	Athens (Greece) - Lillehammer - Alta - Oslo - Gjøvik - Otta - Elverum - Trysil - Lillehammer (Norway)
(Switzerland) Lausanne 2020	110	-	-	Athens (Greece) - Lausanne - Morges - Nyon – Yverdon-les-Bains - Payerne - Aigle - Ollon - University of Lausanne - Échallens - Château-d'Œx - Prilly - Bourg-en-Lavaux - Lausanne - Geneva - Neuchâtel - Lausanne (Switzerland)
(South Korea) Gangwon 2024	47	-	-	Athens (Greece) - Gangwon Province (South Korea)

== See also ==
- List of people who have lit the Olympic cauldron
