= 2020 Icheon fire =

Fire in South Korea

- Date: 29 April 2020
- Location: Icheon, South Korea
- Cause: Unclear - flammable material ignited & caused explosions
- Deaths: 39
- Injuries: 10

A major fire occurred on 29 April 2020 at a construction site in Icheon, South Korea, killing 39 people and injuring another 10. Blood samples taken from 23 victims indicate most had died from carbon monoxide poisoning. Autopsies have been completed on 15 of the 39 people killed, as recommended by South Korea authorities, but has angered victims' families. All killed workers were irregular or subcontract workers.

The building under construction has four floors above-ground and two more underground. The building did not have sprinklers or other obligatory safety measures. The fire broke out when some 78 workers were in the sub-basement working on polyurethane foam. The first explosion occurred around 13:30 (4:30 UTC). At least 10 explosions were heard.

Authorities launched an investigation to determine the cause of the fire and what safety regulations were violated.

An earlier fire at a refrigerated warehouse in Icheon on 7 January 2008 had killed 40 workers.

== See also ==
- 2017 Jecheon fire
- Miryang hospital fire
- Wooshin Golden Suites fire
