= Wooshin Golden Suites fire =

2010 fire in Busan, South Korea

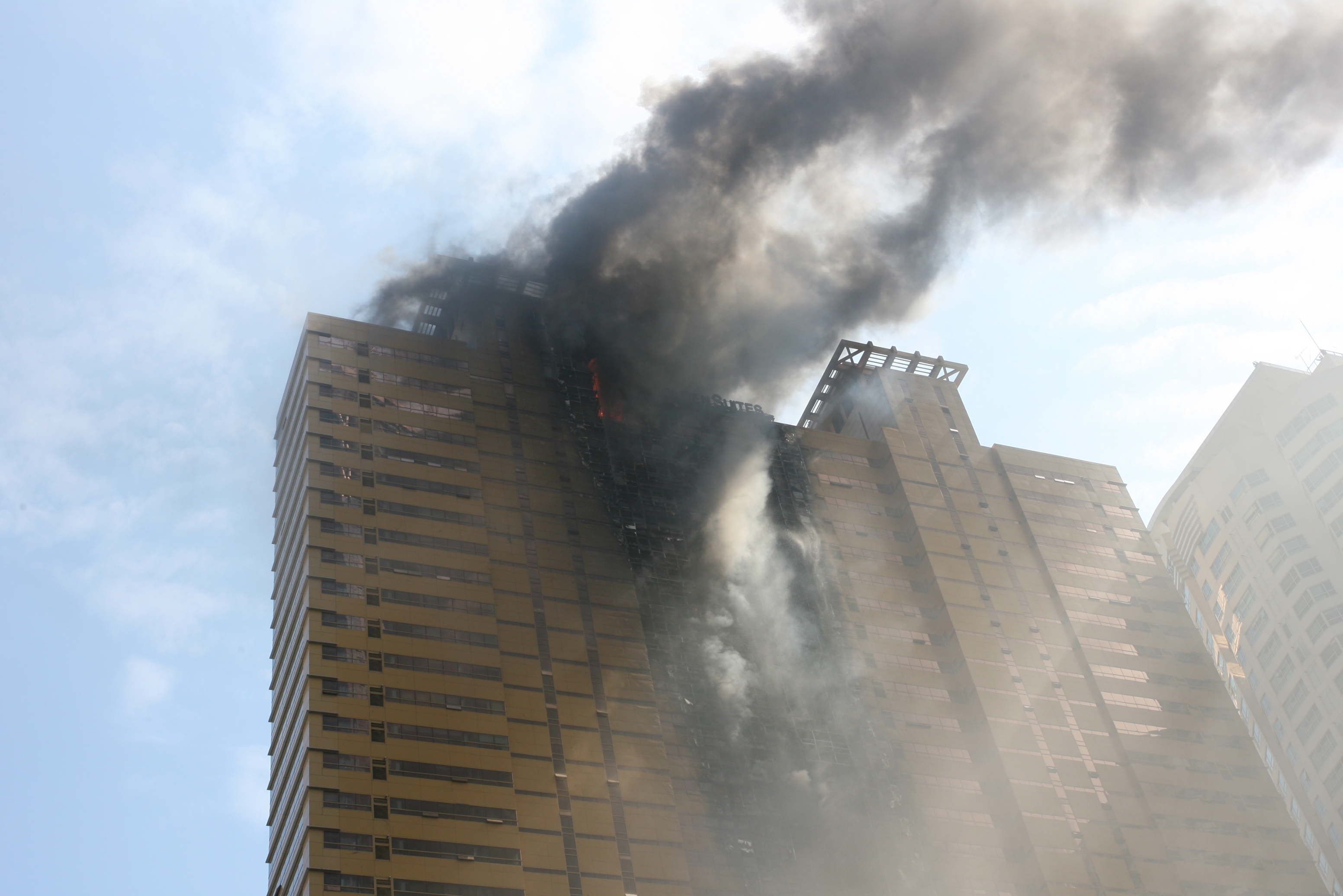
The fire primarily spread up the combustible cladding in a U-shaped indentation in the building's exterior, reaching the top of the building within 20 minutes

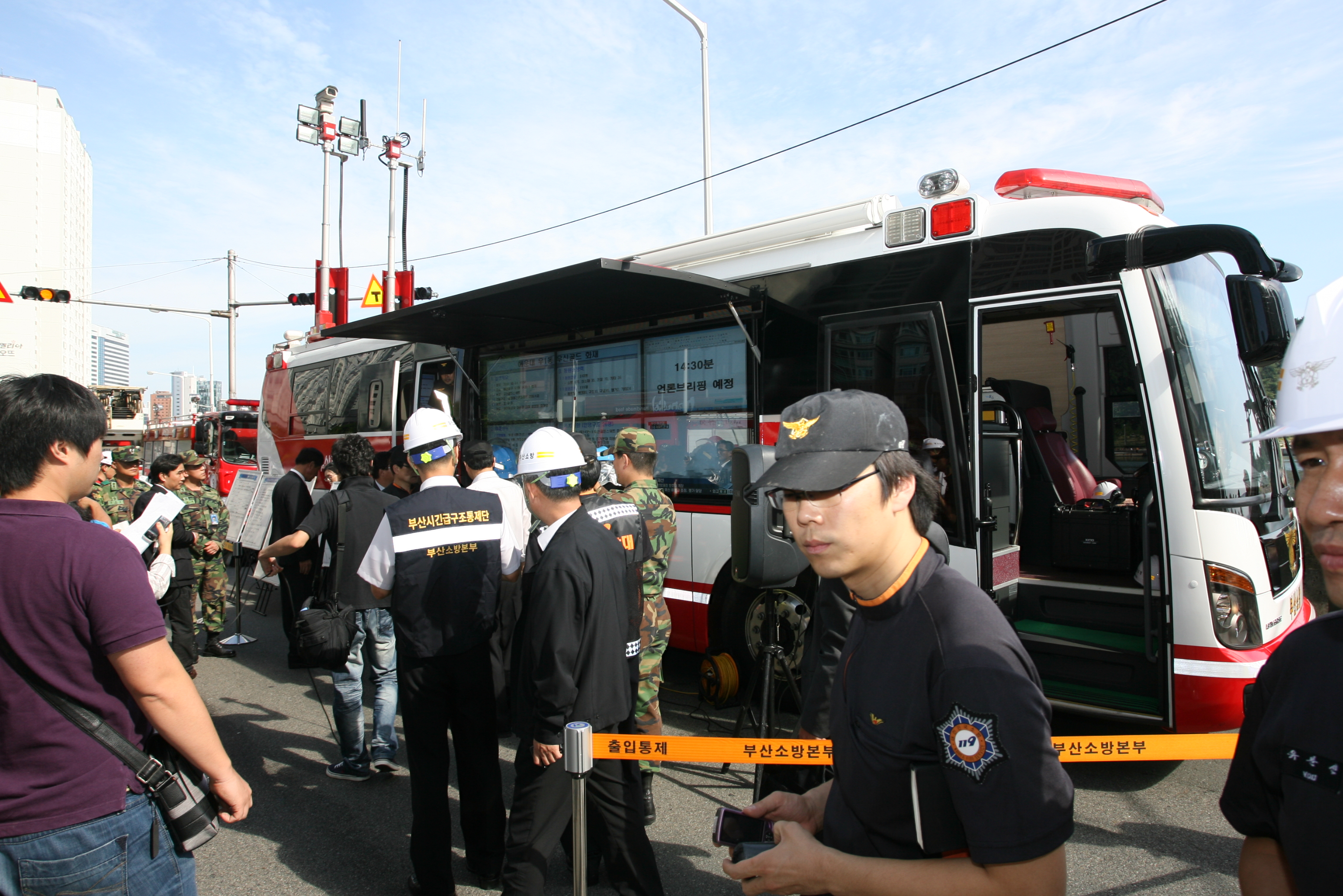
Firefighters at the scene

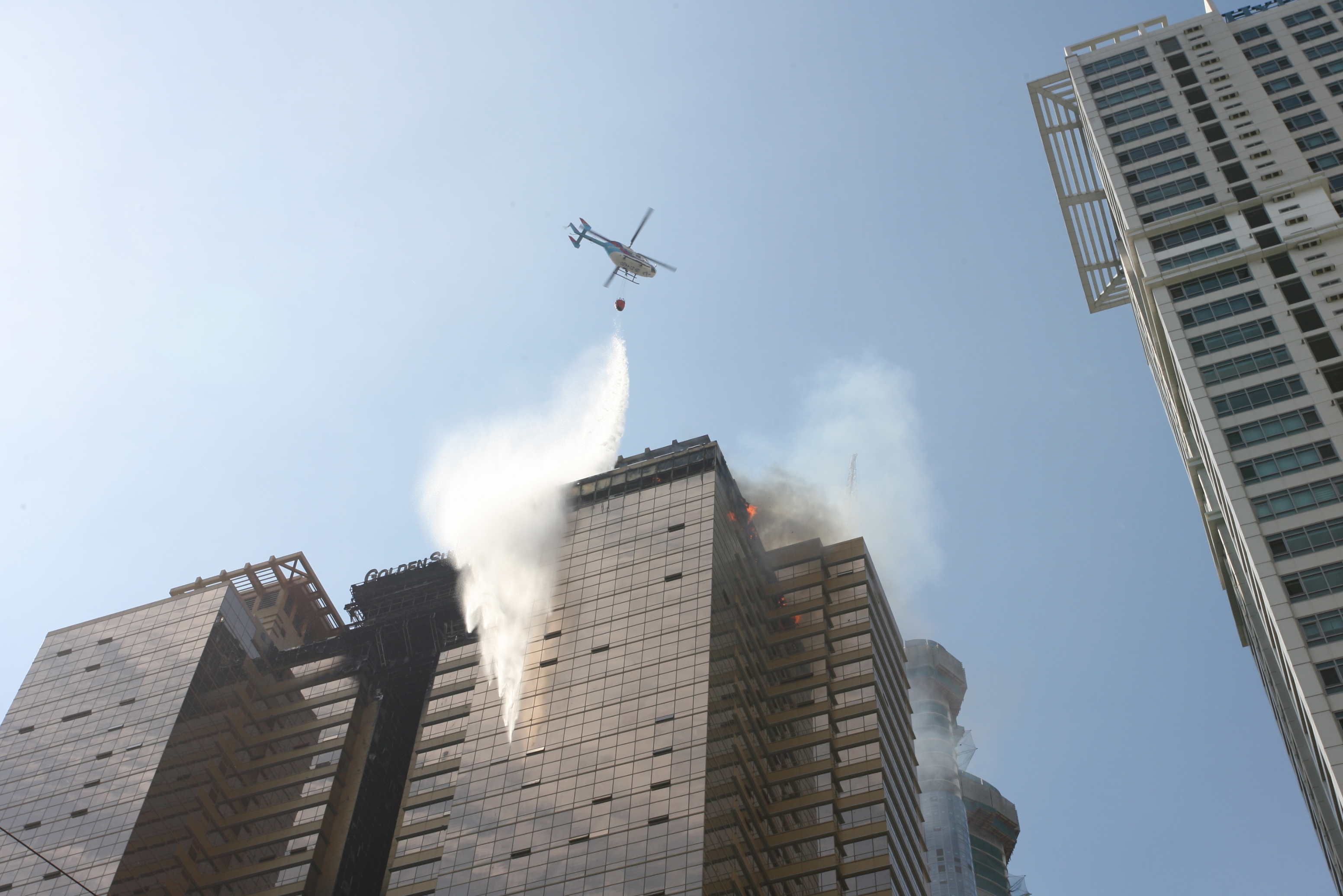
A helicopter was used as part of the firefighting efforts

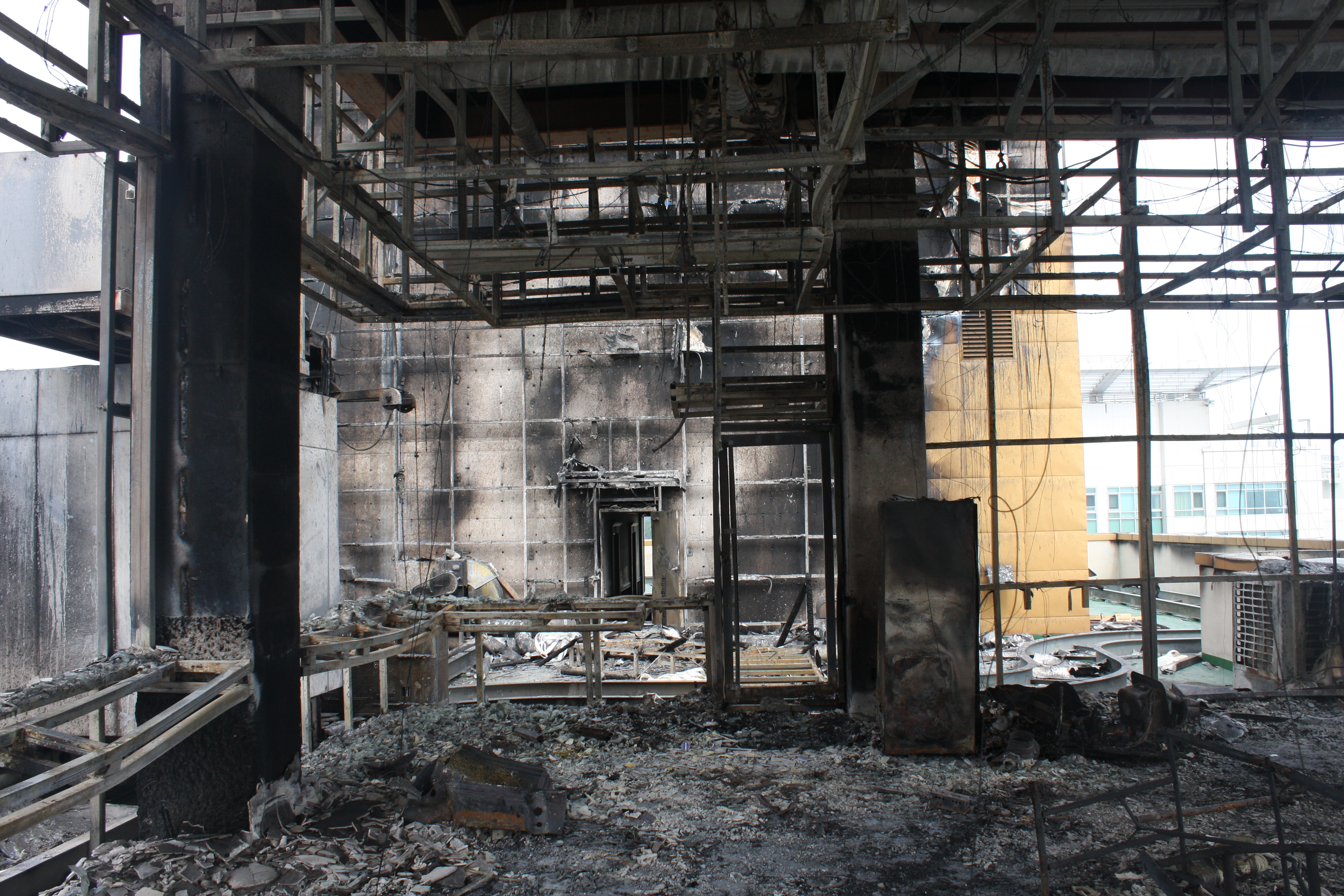
Aftermath

The Wooshin Golden Suites fire was a fire that occurred at an officetel in Marine City, Haeundae, Busan, South Korea on October 1, 2010. The fire started on the fourth floor, caused by a spark from an electrical outlet, and rapidly spread to the top of the building via external combustible cladding; five injuries were reported.

== Fire ==
- The fire started around 11:34am on the 4th floor.
- A fire engine with a 52-metre ladder was launched, but firefighters could not control the fire because it spread so quickly.
- Within 20 minutes, the blaze had reached the 38th floor.
- According to The Korea Times, the blaze was extinguished after 2.5 hours, after mobilising dozens of fire engines and a helicopter that dropped water on the building from above. According to Nathan White and Michael Delichatsios, writing in Fire Hazards of Exterior Wall Assemblies Containing Combustible Components, the original 4th-floor fire was put out by 1 pm, with the entire building fire-free by 6.48 pm.
- Some residents were evacuated by helicopter from the building's roof.

== Causes and background ==
- There was no sprinkler in the 4th-floor room where the fire started.
- The reinforced glass in the windows hindered firefighters.
- The building featured flammable aluminium composite cladding with a polyethylene core, along with glass wool or polystyrene insulation; the fire rapidly spread up the facade, reaching the top of the tower within 20 minutes.
- The fire primarily spread up a vertical U-shaped indentation in the building's exterior, which created a chimney effect, possibly enhanced by wind blowing in from the sea.

== Casualties ==
- 4 residents and 1 fire fighter were injured.

== See also ==
- 2017 Jecheon fire
- Miryang hospital fire
- Incheon Seil Electric Fire
- Jongno Dormitory fire
- 2020 Icheon fire
- Ulsan Samhwan Art Nouveau Fire
- Marco Polo condo fire
