= Concerns and controversies at the 1988 Winter Olympics =

A number of notable controversies and concerns associated with the 1988 Winter Olympics in Calgary, Alberta, Canada, emerged which were the subject of public debate and media commentary.

== Safety ==
=== Death of Joerg Oberhammer ===
On February 25, 1988, 47 year old Austrian Olympic Team physician Joerg Oberhammer died after falling into the path of a snow-grooming machine after colliding with another skier between runs of the men's giant slalom. Swiss team skiers Pirmin Zurbriggen and Martin Hangl witnessed Oberhammer's death from the chairlift, Zurbriggen went on to win a gold medal, while Hangl withdrew from the giant slalom due to the incident.

== Environmental ==
=== Weather ===
Weather at Calgary International Airport during the 1988 Winter Olympic Games
Date	High °C (°F)	Low °C (°F)	Low Windchill °C (°F)
February 13, 1988	4.7 (40.5)	−8.9 (16.0)	−16.0 (3.2)
February 14, 1988	4.6 (40.3)	−11.6 (11.1)	−17.0 (1.4)
February 15, 1988	5.1 (41.2)	−4.3 (24.3)	−10.0 (14.0)
February 16, 1988	4.9 (40.8)	−5.8 (21.6)	−10.0 (14.0)
February 17, 1988	6.0 (42.8)	0.6 (33.1)	—N/a
February 18, 1988	7.5 (45.5)	−7.1 (19.2)	−9.0 (15.8)
February 19, 1988	11.2 (52.2)	3.8 (38.8)	—N/a
February 20, 1988	15.9 (60.6)	6.8 (44.2)	—N/a
February 21, 1988	11.8 (53.2)	−1.8 (28.8)	−9.0 (15.8)
February 22, 1988	−0.8 (30.6)	−10.5 (13.1)	−16.0 (3.2)
February 23, 1988	−0.4 (31.3)	−14.7 (5.5)	−21.0 (−5.8)
February 24, 1988	14.9 (58.8)	−7.2 (19.0)	−12.0 (10.4)
February 25, 1988	17.5 (63.5)	2.7 (36.9)	—N/a
February 26, 1988	18.1 (64.6)	1.4 (34.5)	—N/a
February 27, 1988	12.9 (55.2)	0.2 (32.4)	—N/a
February 28, 1988	10.8 (51.4)	−7.7 (18.1)	−12.0 (10.4)

The weather conditions for the 1988 Winter Olympics were a significant problem, with temperatures ranging from −30 to 22 °C (−22 to 72 °F). Of the 176 events scheduled for the 1988 Games, 30 were postponed and rescheduled due to inclement weather. The men's downhill skiing event at Nakiska was postponed for one day, due to Chinook winds blowing up to 160 km/h. The women's downhill event also experienced the same scenario. With the ski jumping venue facing north at Canada Olympic Park (COP), the same winds also disrupted those events, with the large hill event being postponed four times. It had also disrupted the Nordic combined events, in which the ski jumping part had to be postponed as well. For the first time in Olympic history, both the ski jumping and Nordic combined cross-country skiing events was contested in a single day.

Despite using artificial cooling, the bobsleigh and luge events at COP was not spared, with several races being postponed due to the high temperatures during that time. During the Two-man Bobsleigh, sand and dust particles ended up being deposited onto the artificial track by Chinook winds, resulting in a noticeably faster track for later participants. The Soviet Union's two man bobsleigh team won gold after an unexpected come-from-behind win over the heavy favourite East German teams.

The high on February 26, 1988, in Calgary reached 18.1 °C (64.6 °F), an all-time record high for the city on that day.

== Doping ==
The drug testing laboratory for the 1988 Winter Olympic Games was installed at Foothills Hospital and accredited by the IOC Medical Commission in December 1987. During the games a total of 428 urine samples were tested for banned substances, with one competitor testing positive for testosterone, and five hidden control samples correctly identified by the laboratory. The laboratory tested for five classes of drugs, stimulants, narcotic analgesics, anabolic steroids, β-blockers, and diuretics, as well as the masking agent probenecid.

=== Ice hockey ===
Polish ice-hockey player Jarosław Morawiecki tested positive for the banned substance Testosterone during the Games. The 23 year old centre, who was considered Poland's best player, exceeded the allowable limit of testosterone in random testing after a match which saw Poland defeat France 6–2. Polish coach Leszek Lejczyk claimed Morawiecki was deliberately drugged for political reasons.

The International Ice Hockey Federation (IIHF) banned Morawiecki from competition for 18 months and invalidated Poland's victory in the France match. Poland finished 5th of 6th in the tournament Group A standings.

=== Nordic Skiing ===
Prior to the 1988 Winter Olympics, American Nordic combined skier Kerry Lynch admitted to taking illegal blood transfusions under the guidance of coach Jim Page prior to the 1987 FIS Nordic World Ski Championships where he finished 2nd in the 15 km individual event. FIS subsequently suspended Lynch for two years which included the 1988 Games. During the 1988 Games, Canadian Nordic skiing coach Martin Hall alleged the Soviet Union's success was a result of blood doping. The national ski federations of Finland, Norway and Sweden later demanded blood doping tests be carried out in future Nordic skiing events.

== Organization ==
=== Ticket Sales ===
A series of ticket-related scandals plagued the organizing committee as the Games approached, resulting in widespread public anger. Demand for tickets was high, particularly for the premier events which had sold out a year in advance. Residents had been promised that only 10 per cent of tickets would go to "Olympic insiders", IOC officials and sponsors, but OCO'88 was later forced to admit that up to 50 percent of seats to top events had gone to insiders. The organizing committee, which was subsequently chastised by mayor Klein for running a "closed shop", admitted that it had failed to properly communicate the obligations it had to supply IOC officials and sponsors with priority tickets.

Organizers attempted to respond to public concern by asking sponsors to consider reducing their orders and by paying $1.5 million to add 2,600 seats to the Saddledome, as well as increase capacity for ski jumping, alpine skiing and the opening and closing ceremonies. Organizers noted that the Calgary Games offered a then-record 1.9 million tickets for sale, three times the amount available at Sarajevo or Lake Placid, and that 79 per cent of tickets were to be allocated Calgarians and 21 per cent to sponsors and other VIPs. By the start of the 1988 Winter Games, a record of over 1.4 million tickets had been sold, a figure that eclipsed the previous three Winter Games combined. In the OCO'88's final report, the Committee admits the culmination of fraud charges, large portion of premier tickets requested by Olympic insiders, and poor communications led to a negative public reaction to the ticketing process.

These events were preceded by the ticketing manager for OCO'88 being charged with theft and fraud after he sent modified ticket request forms to Americans that asked them to pay in United States funds rather than Canadian and to return them to his company's post office box rather than the office of the organizing committee. The American dollar was trading 40 cents higher than the Canadian dollar, resulting in significantly higher than anticipated revenue through currency conversion. The ticket manager maintained his innocence claiming he was used as a scapegoat and credit card company Visa was responsible for the error, despite his claims, the ticketing manager was convicted of fraud, theft, and forgery, and sentenced to 5 years in prison.

Other planning and logistical issues plagued ticket sales during the 1988 Winter Olympics. The OCO'88 ticketing department was not prepared to handle the significant demand created by the aggressive marketing strategy which saw cut-out advertisements placed in 27 major Canadian newspapers (3.7 million forms) and other international papers (800,000 forms) allowing individuals to buy tickets by mailing a certified cheque. Members of the public were under the assumption that the "first-come first-serve" ticketing process would allow those who mailed their cheques on the same day the forms were released the first rights at tickets. However, Canada Post did not mark letters with the date of posting, and the ticketing department placed mail into large 800-letter bins which was then opened in a computer generated random order. The backlog resulted in purchaser order notifications being delayed a month from November 30, 1986, to December 31, 1986. A second public ticket update was issued in February 1987 to notify the public of what tickets remained, as 50 per cent had been allocated by then, and a third ticket update was sent out in May 1987.

There were several groups which received pre-allocated tickets. The Children's Ticket Fund provided a total of 12,088 tickets were distributed to child-focused agencies and communities within Alberta and eastern British Columbia.

== Protests ==
=== Lubicon Lake Band Protest ===
The Lubicon Lake Band, a Cree First Nations in northern Alberta orchestrated a boycott of elements of the 1988 Winter Olympic Games as a protest for the abusive treatment by the Government of Canada. The Government of Canada had promised the Lubicon Cree a land settlement in 1940 which had failed to materialize.

OCO'88 had planned an CA$13 million Olympic Arts Festival to take place from January 14, 1988, to May 1, 1988, during the Games with over 600 exhibitions. The Lubicon protest focused on the Glenbow Museum's "The Spirit Sings: Artistic Traditions of Canada's First Peoples" exhibition sponsored by Shell Canada, which sought to display over 6,000 displaced first nations and non-first nations artifacts brought together from collections around the world. The Spirit Sings was considered by OCO'88 chairman Frank King as the "flagship" event of the Olympic Arts Festival. The Spirit Sings was intended to bring a wide array of First nations ethnographic materials from public and private European collections back to Canada for display, many of the artifacts were considered "lost" to Canadian scholars. The Spirt Sings sold more than 126,000 tickets during its five-week run in Calgary.

The Lubicon Cree began publicly discussing their goals and past treatment by the provincial and federal governments in the early-1980s which attracted broad national and international attention, with articles discussing the Lubicon plight appearing in The Globe and Mail and The New York Times. The Lubicon call for a boycott started in 1986 after Shell Canada was announced as the sponsor for The Spirit Sings, Shell had developed oil and gas infrastructure on land claimed by the Lubicon Cree. Lubicon Cree leaders Lennarson and Ominayak began a public relations campaign to convince European museums holding desirable objects for The Spirit Sings to not loan the objects, and were supported by other Indigenous organizations such as the Assembly of First Nations, the Indian Association of Alberta, the Metis Association of Alberta, and the Grand Council of Crees of Quebec. The boycott was somewhat successful, as it dissuaded 29 international museums from participating in The Spirit Sings, including New York's National Museum of the American Indian. During the torch relay in Quebec, 700 Mohawks protested along the route.
