= 1948 Summer Olympics torch relay =

- Host city: London, United Kingdom
- Countries visited: Greece, Italy, Switzerland, France, Luxembourg, Belgium, England
- Distance: 3,160 km
- Torchbearers: 1,688
- Start date: 17 July 1948
- End date: 29 July 1948
- Torch designer: Ralph Lavers

The 1948 Summer Olympics torch relay was run from 17 July until 29 July 1948, prior to the 1948 Summer Olympics, held in London, United Kingdom. The relay was nicknamed the "relay of peace". It was only the second occasion that a torch relay was held for the Olympics; the first was at the 1936 Summer Olympics.

There were three types of torches designed for use on the relay: a standard solid fuel powered torch made of aluminium, a special butane gas torch used on board HMS Whitesand Bay, and a final torch used to enter Empire Stadium that was made of stainless steel and powered by a magnesium candle.

The route itself was initially designed to be a direct one from Olympia to Wembley, taking in Italy, Switzerland and France. Belgium and Luxembourg were added to the route after those countries requested it. It was expected that the Greek part of the relay would be 750 kilometres (470 mi), but was reduced to 35 kilometres (22 mi) due to concerns over security. After the 12-day journey, the torch arrived at the Empire Stadium only thirty seconds later than expected.

== Background ==
London having hosted the 1908 Summer Olympics, the 1948 event was only the second Games to stage an Olympic torch relay, it being first run at the 1936 Summer Olympics in Berlin. Former British athlete David Cecil, 6th Marquess of Exeter, and the rest of the organising committee for the 1948 Games, agreed to run a torch relay for a second time.

== Relay elements ==
=== Torch ===
Each of the torches contained a solid fuel tablet made of hexamine and 6% naphthalene (following torch running tests in May 1947) that fuelled the flame itself. The solid fuel increased the distance each runner could run to 2 miles (3.2 km) over flat terrain, decreasing the number of torches needed to be produced, which in turn reduced the cost of the relay. There were eight tablets loaded into each torch, with the bottom tablets pushed up by the use of a spring. The design increased the burning time of each torch up to around fifteen minutes, an increase from the four-minute torches of the 1936 Olympics. The torch itself was designed by Ralph Lavers, with the brief that it should be "inexpensive and easy to make, of pleasing appearance and a good example of British craftmanship". The torches were made from aluminium, with a long shaft holding a cup that contained the burner. "With thanks to the bearer" was written on the cup of the torch itself, along with the Olympic rings. The torches for the Greek leg of the relay were shipped to the Mediterranean aboard HMS Liverpool, along with a purpose-built torch for the leg aboard a Royal Navy vessel from Corfu to Italy.

A differently designed torch was used for the final leg. It was made of stainless steel and was fueled by magnesium in order to ensure that the flame showed up properly during the opening ceremony. It was also designed by Ralph Lavers, with the frame for the torch created by EMI, and the magnesium candle supplied by Wessex Aircraft Engineering. Neither the suppliers nor designer charged a fee for the final torch.

=== Planned torch route ===
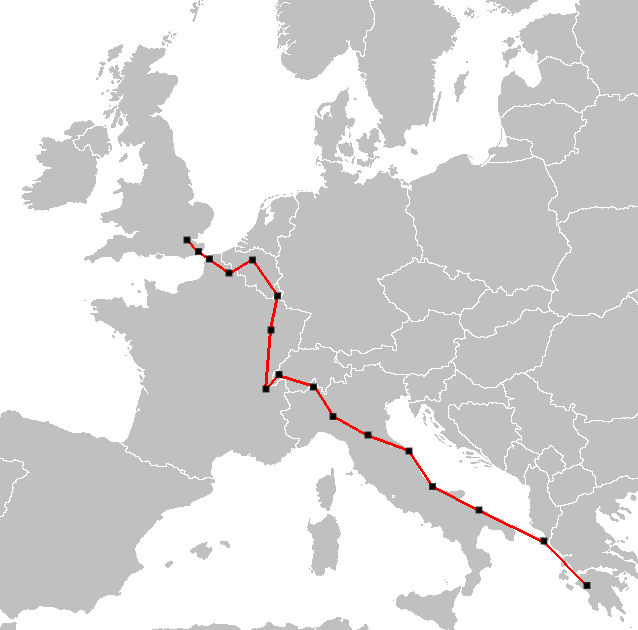
The Olympic torch relay route for the 1948 Summer Olympics

Key

* As planned

Location	Distance	Stages	Torches
Greece	750 kilometres*	300	324
HMS Whitesand Bay	415 kilometres	—	6
Italy	1,072 kilometres	500	540
Switzerland	261 kilometres	135	144
France (i)	521 kilometres	270	300
Luxembourg	108 kilometres	38	42
Belgium	287 kilometres	108	120
France (ii)	126 kilometres	—	—
HMS Bicester	35 kilometres	—	12
England (Dover - Wembley)	255 kilometres	73	80
England (Wembley - Torquay)	330 kilometres	107	120
Total	3,160 kilometres (1,960 mi)	1531	1688

Source: The Official Report of the Organising Committee for the XIV Olympiad

=== Torch route ===
Vessels that carried the Olympic torch in 1948

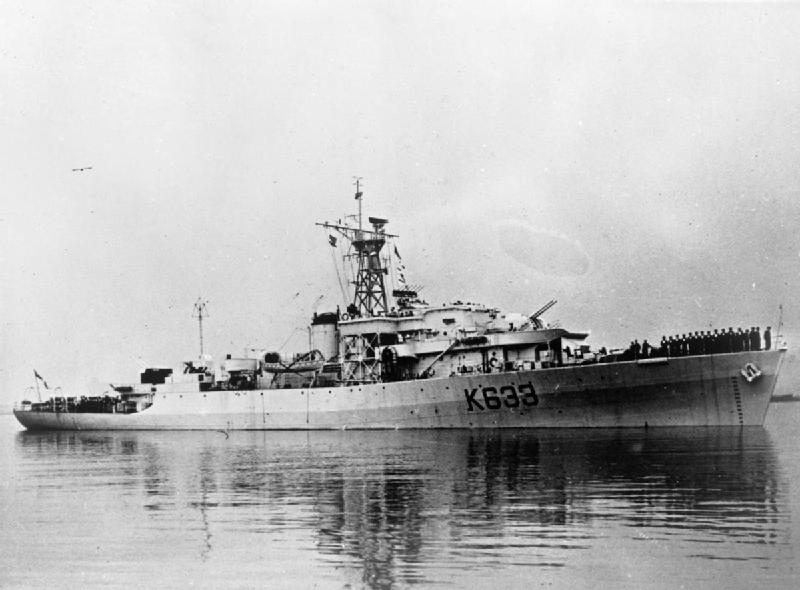
HMS Whitesand Bay, which carried the torch from Corfu to Bari, Italy

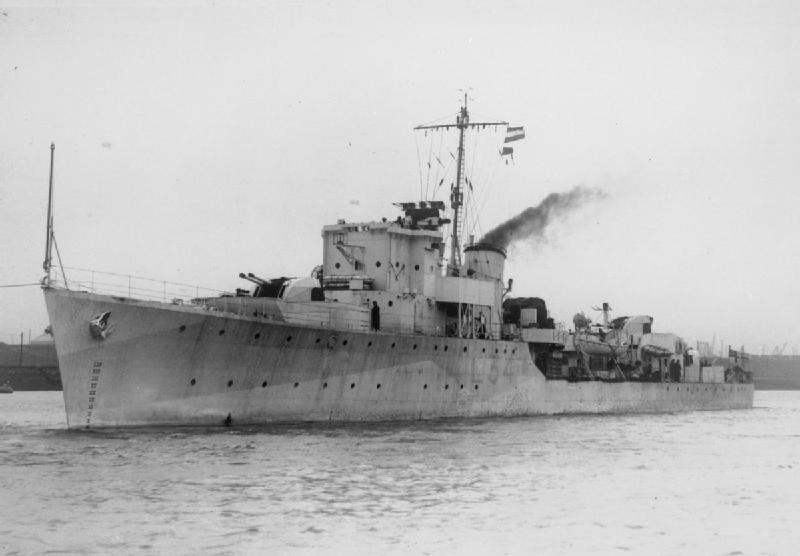
HMS Bicester, which carried the torch across the English Channel to Dover

While the general negotiation with other countries and the specific route were handled by the Organising Committee for the Games, the detailed organisation was delegated to a subgroup led by F.W. Collins. Due to cost implications, the extensive route conducted by the 1936 Games was ruled out. Instead, the simplest route from Olympia to London was to be used, going by sea to Italy and then run through Switzerland and France. The route was modified only when Luxembourg and Belgium both requested that the torch travel their territories. A longer Greek route was planned, but reduced from an expected 750 kilometres (470 mi) down to 35 kilometres (22 mi) due to concerns over the civil war in the country and a lack of security.

The torch lighting ceremony took place on 17 July 1948 in Olympia, Greece. As with the 1936 Summer Olympic relay, the torch relay was begun by focusing the sun's rays onto kindling using a parabolic reflector, which then lit the first torch. The kindling was conducted by a Girl Guide leader from Pyrgos, Elis. She was only chosen the previous evening due to the unsettled state of the country; the Athenian girl who was trained for the ceremony was unable to travel to Olympia. In a symbolic gesture, the first runner, Corporal Dimitrelis of the Greek Army, laid down his arms and removed his military uniform before taking his torch in hand. The kindling material for the first torch was handed over as a gift from the Chairman of the Greek Olympic Committee to Collins, for Princess Elizabeth. It was then run to the Greek coast at Katakolo, where at 7 pm it boarded the Greek destroyer Hastings bound for the island of Corfu. It stayed overnight in the city of Corfu, and boarded HMS Whitesand Bay at 1:30 pm the following day where the flame was switched to a specially equipped butane gas torch in order to ensure that there was a 48-hour lifespan available for the flame, despite the crossing only being expected to take 22 hours.

The ship dropped the torch off in Bari at 12:30 pm on 19 July. It was run north through several Italian cities before crossing the Simplon Pass into Brig, Switzerland on 23 July. From there it was run west until leaving the country at Perly-Certoux, and entering France at Saint-Julien-en-Genevois. The route then detours from the direct route to take in Luxembourg and into Belgium before re-entering France at Lille on 28 July, finally departing the country at Calais. HMS Bicester carried the torch across the English Channel to Dover, arriving at 8:25 pm on 28 July. It travelled through several towns in the South East of England until it arrived at Wembley, where it arrived only thirty seconds late after the entire journey. That delay may have only been in the final few hundred yards of the relay down Olympic Way outside of Empire Stadium as the pressure of the crowds on the torch carrier and their escorts reduced the pace to walking speed. Special celebrations were held at each border crossing, and at Pierre de Coubertin's tomb in Lausanne, Switzerland.

It was agreed for a secondary Olympic Flame to be lit in Torquay during the games (as the town hosted the sailing events), and a secondary torch relay was conducted to take the flame from Wembley south to the coast to Torquay. The arrangements were the same as from Dover to Wembley but in reverse.

Outside Greece, the cities and towns visited by the Olympic flame were the following ones:

Nation	Cities and towns
Italy	Bari, Foggia, Pescara, Ancona, Rimini, Bologna, Parma, Piacenza, Milan, Domodossola, the Simplon Pass.
Switzerland	Brig, Martigny, Montreux, Lausanne, Geneva, Perly.
France	St. Julien en Genevois, Belgarde, Nantua, Lons-le-Saulnier, Poligny, Besançon, Vesoul, Epinal, Nancy, Metz, Thionville, Evrange.
Luxembourg	Frisange, Esch, Luxembourg City, Ettelbruck, Wiltz.
Belgium	Bras, Bastogne, Marche, Namur, Brussels, Renaix, Tournai, Hertain.
France	Lille, Armentieres, St. Omer, Calais.
England, United Kingdom	Dover, Canterbury, Charing, Maidstone, Westerham, Redhill, Reigate, Dorking, Guildford, Bagshot, Ascot, Windsor, Slough, Uxbridge, London.
