= Tsentralnyi Stadion (Vinnytsia) =

Multi-use stadium in Vinnytsia, Ukraine

Coordinates: 49°14′36″N 28°29′23″E

Tsentralnyi miskyi stadion Central City Stadium
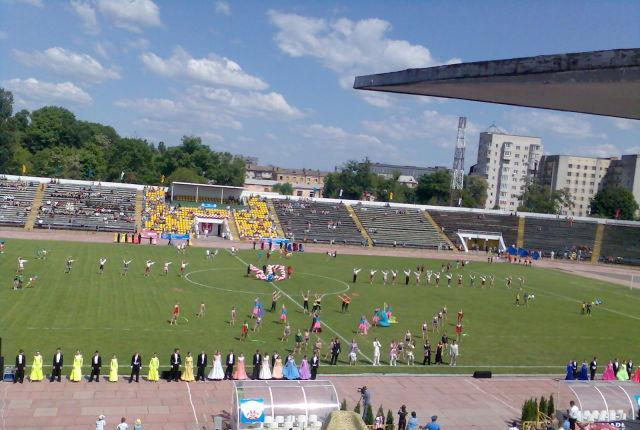
- Interactive map of Tsentralnyi miskyi stadion Central City Stadium
- Former names: Lokomotyv Stadium
- Location: Vinnytsia, Ukraine
- Owner: Vinnytsia city
- Capacity: 24,000 (football)
- Surface: Grass
- Field size: 106 m × 75 m (348 ft × 246 ft)

Construction
- Opened: 1949

Tenant
- FC Nyva Vinnytsia

Central City Stadium (Ukrainian: Центральний міський стадіон, Tsentralnyi miskyi stadion) is a multi-use stadium in Vinnytsia, Ukraine.

It is currently used mostly for football matches, and is the home of FC Nyva Vinnytsia and FC Vinnytsia. The stadium holds 24,000 people.

== History ==
The stadium was built after World War II in 1949 by workers of Vinnytsia city and Southwestern Railways and was named as Lokomotyv (Lokomotyv Stadium). Before 1972, its capacity was 12,000 spectators.

During 1972-1980, the stadium was completely renovated. There was built the stadium's bowl of reinforced concrete, installed lighting towers, radio communication, information screen, and seating capacity increased to 24,000 spectators.

During the 1980 Summer Olympics in Moscow, the stadium was hosting the Olympic flame as part of the 1980 Summer Olympics torch relay.

In 1996, the Tsentralnyi Stadion hosted two games of the 1996–97 UEFA Cup Winners' Cup.
