= 1940 Summer Olympics torch relay =

Though the whole event was eventually cancelled due to the outbreak of war, the 1940 Summer Olympics torch relay was planned for both of the proposed host cities. The International Olympic Committee (IOC) awarded the 1940 Summer Olympics to Tokyo, Japan in July 1936. Tokyo's ability to host the event was questioned after war broke out with China (the Second Sino-Japanese War) with some countries calling for the Games to be boycotted. The Japanese decided to cancel the event and Helsinki, Finland, the runner-up city in the bidding process, was selected as the replacement. That too was cancelled after the outbreak of World War II.

At the 1936 Summer Olympics in Berlin the first torch relay event took place, starting a tradition that has continued in all the Games that have taken place since. Both National Olympic Committees had given details about their plan for the Olympic Torch relay.

== Tokyo plans ==
The distance from Olympia to Berlin made it possible to hold a relay on foot in a reasonable amount of time, but the distance to Tokyo gave the IOC cause for concern. They discussed the viability of such an undertaking on numerous occasions and eventually decided that they should try to replicate the success of the inaugural torch relay using "[s]teamers, automobiles, and airplanes". A report into the progress made on the planning of the Games stated that there would be a significant benefit "in diffusing the Olympic spirit in the districts where the knowledge of the Olympic movement is as yet very scanty".

The organisation team behind the 1936 relay made recommendations to the Japanese Olympic Committee about how it could be completed. Their suggestions would see the torch carried for 10,000 km by runners and horse riders, travelling along the Silk Road across Central Asia. A significant portion of the relay would therefore take place across China, an idea not favoured by the Japanese. Another proposal, coming from Germany, was to pioneer the idea of air delivery of the Torch, in the purpose-built Messerschmitt Me 261 Adolfine long-range aircraft, which was designed to have a maximum range of some 11,024 km (6,850 mi) unrefueled.

Several suggestions were made by the Japanese Olympic Committee about how the flame could be taken from Olympia to Tokyo. One proposal was for the torch to be carried on board a Japanese warship, but a later idea was for it to be taken by the Kamikaze, a Mitsubishi Ki-15 plane, across southern Asia. When the flame arrived in Japan it would be carried from Mount Hyūga in Kyushu to Tokyo via the Ise Shrine.

A relay from Olympia to Tokyo eventually took place when the city hosted the 1964 Summer Olympics.

== Helsinki plans ==
The Finnish Olympic Committee planned an ambitious relay that would cross Europe. The first part of the route would be very similar to that of 1936 as the torch travelled up to Berlin, the only addition being a detour to Slovakia. From there it would make its way through to Scandinavia, taken by a rowing boat where necessary.

There was a further proposal that the flame would make its way to every Olympic Stadium in each host city of the previous ten Summer Games. Cauldrons at these locations would also keep the flame burning for the duration of the Games. While the torch route would include Athens, Berlin, and Stockholm the other host cities were further afield and would require alternative arrangements. Suggestions included branching off the relay to the European cities but it would be more difficult to arrange travel to the two in the United States.

=== Cities included in the route ===
The route would visit the following cities across Europe:

Location	Map
Olympia, Greece; Athens; Thessaloniki	1940 Summer Olympics torch relay is located in Greece
Sofia, Bulgaria	1940 Summer Olympics torch relay is located in Bulgaria
Niš, Kingdom of Yugoslavia; Belgrade; Novi Sad	1940 Summer Olympics torch relay is located in Yugoslavia (1939–1941)
Szeged, Hungary; Budapest; Mosonmagyaróvár	1940 Summer Olympics torch relay is located in Hungary
Bratislava	1940 Summer Olympics torch relay is located in Slovakia
Vienna	1940 Summer Olympics torch relay is located in Austria
Tábor; Prague; Teplice	1940 Summer Olympics torch relay is located in Czechoslovakia
Dresden; Bad Liebenwerda; Berlin; Wittenberg; Perleberg; Schwerin; Lübeck; Kiel; Flensburg	1940 Summer Olympics torch relay is located in Germany
Kolding; Nyborg; Korsør; Copenhagen; Helsingør	1940 Summer Olympics torch relay is located in Denmark
Helsingborg; Gothenburg	1940 Summer Olympics torch relay is located in Sweden
Oslo	1940 Summer Olympics torch relay is located in Norway
Karlstad; Stockholm; Sundsvall; Umeå; Luleå; Haparanda	1940 Summer Olympics torch relay is located in Sweden
Jyväskylä; Helsinki	1940 Summer Olympics torch relay is located in Finland
