= Miryang hospital fire =

Fire at the Sejong Hospital in the city of Miryang, South Korea

- Miryang hospital fire (South Korea)
- Date: 26 January 2018
- Time: 7:35 a.m. (KST)
- Duration: 3 hours
- Venue: Sejong Hospital
- Location: Miryang, South Gyeongsang, South Korea; 35°28′34″N 128°45′58″E
- Type: Hospital fire
- Deaths: 41
- Injuries: 153

On 26 January 2018, a fire at the Sejong Hospital in the South Korean city of Miryang killed 41 people and injured 153. It was South Korea's deadliest fire in nearly a decade. The fire occurred one month after 29 people died in a gym fire in the city of Jecheon. The cause of the fire is under investigation.

== Hospitals ==
The Sejong Hospital and adjacent Sejong Nursing Hospital were established in 2008 by the Hyoseong Medical Foundation. The Sejong Hospital is a large general hospital; the hospital and the Sejong Nursing Hospital have 95 beds and 98 beds respectively with 27 medical staff each.

The Sejong Hospital was not required to install fire sprinklers based on its aggregate area, whereas in the Sejong Nursing Hospital, sprinklers were required to be installed after the relevant law was revised and were planned to be installed by 30 June.

== Incident ==
The fire began on the first floor of the Sejong Hospital at 7:35 a.m. (KST). At the time, there were over 100 patients in the main hospital and 94 in the adjacent nursing home complex. Two nurses stated that they had seen fire suddenly erupting in the emergency room, immediately triggering an evacuation process throughout the hospital and nursing home. As the fire began to spread through the first level of the main hospital, large volumes of smoke spread into the upper floors.

By the time firefighters arrived, 25 people were already dead. Firefighters worked through thick smoke to save patients, including 15 patients from the third floor intensive care unit under the supervision of hospital staff.

Shortly after the fire began, local Miryang resident Jeong Dong Hwa mounted a rescue effort that saved the lives of ten people who were trapped on the hospital's fifth floor. Jeong's brother-in-law and sister-in-law also participated in rescue efforts to help save the lives of people trapped on the third floor.

The fire was brought under control after 9:30 a.m. (KST).

=== Victims ===
The fire killed 41 people and injured 153. Among the 41 deaths were one doctor, one nurse and one assistant nurse. Thirty people were over 70 years old. Jeong's 88-year-old mother-in-law was found alive on the third floor but died the following day.

== Response ==
In the immediate aftermath of the fire, South Korean President Moon Jae-in called an emergency meeting, ordering emergency officials in and around the area to continue focusing life-saving support on the evacuated patients. Senior officials from both ruling and opposition parties traveled to the area to offer their condolences to victims and families.

Ruling Democratic Party spokeswoman Kim Hyun urged authorities "to mobilize all available personnel and equipment to handle the aftermath" while Liberty Korea Party spokesman Choung Tae-ok demanded no negligence in rescue operations. Referencing the Jecheon fire disaster from the previous December, People's Party spokeswoman Lee Heang-Ja stated members felt "deeply saddened that a fire occurred again when the citizens' sorrow of the Jecheon fire still lingers."

For his heroic rescue efforts, Jeong was honored with the President's Award by President Moon.

== See also ==
- 2017 Jecheon fire
- Fukuoka Orthopedics fire
- Jongno Dormitory fire
- Incheon Seil Electric fire
- Wooshin Golden Suites fire
