= 2014 Summer Youth Olympics torch relay =

- Host city: Nanjing, China
- Countries visited: Greece, China (202 others virtually)
- Start date: 30 April 2014
- End date: 16 August 2014
- Torch designer: Ji Ziyi

The 2014 Summer Youth Olympics torch relay took part as part of the build-up to the 2014 Summer Youth Olympics hosted in Nanjing, China.

== Torch ==
Nicknamed the Door of Happiness. The main body of the torch is covered in the metallic luster. And the torch is extremely light. The silver-colored part is designed into the shape of letter “n”, which is the initial of the city's name, Nanjing, and is also in the shape of the city gate of the Ming Dynasty, symbolizing Nanjing's hope to present its grandeur and brilliance to the world through the games. The blue part represents the Yangtze River, the water of which passes through the gate. The gray strips at the bottom of the torch are the symbol of ripples, rendering the torch more dynamic.

== Route ==
A global virtual torch relay was held from 30 April to 16 August, visiting 258 virtual locations around the world. From 30 April to 10 July, each of the world's 204 National Olympic Committees was allotted eight hours to hold the virtual flame. It then visited 30 provinces and regions of China (with Chinese Taipei, Hong Kong, and Macau all having been included in the 204 NOCs instead) from 10 to 28 July. Entering the host province of Jiangsu, the virtual flame separately visited its 12 prefectures from 29 July to 5 August, then each of Nanjing's 11 districts (Jianye was visited twice) from 6 to 16 August.

During the virtual phase of the torch relay, anybody in the world could become a digital torchbearer by downloading the relay's official app and playing its interactive games, featuring the Youth Olympic mascot Nanjinglele. Over 112 million visits to the Nanjing 2014 Virtual Torch Relay server were recorded. Two brief runs were also held with the physical flame collected from Greece in Nanjing on 8 and 12 August, before the lighting of the cauldron at the opening ceremony on 16 August by Chen Ruolin.

Route	Map
30 April (day 1): Greece; 1 May (day 2): Cyprus, Israel, Malta; 2 May (day 3): Albania, Bulgaria, Turkey; 3 May (day 4): Armenia, Azerbaijan, Georgia; 4 May (day 5): Ukraine, Russia, Moldova; 5 May (day 6): Former Yugoslav Republic of Macedonia, Serbia, Romania; 6 May (day 7): Montenegro, Bosnia and Herzegovina, Croatia; 7 May (day 8): Slovenia, San Marino, Italy; 8 May (day 9): Monaco, Andorra, Spain; 9 May (day 10): Portugal, France, Switzerland; 10 May (day 11): Austria; 11 May (day 12): Liechtenstein, Hungary, Slovakia; 12 May (day 13): Czech Republic, Luxembourg, Germany; 13 May (day 14): Belgium, Netherlands, Denmark; 14 May (day 15): Poland, Belarus, Lithuania; 15 May (day 16): Latvia, Estonia, Finland; 16 May (day 17): Norway; 17 May (day 18): Sweden, Ireland, Great Britain	2014 Summer Youth Olympics torch relay is located in Europe
18 May (day 19): Iceland, Bermuda, Canada; 19 May (day 20): United States, Mexico, Belize	2014 Summer Youth Olympics torch relay is located in North America
20 May (day 21): Guatemala, El Salvador, Honduras; 21 May (day 22): Nicaragua, Costa Rica, Jamaica; 22 May (day 23): Cuba, Cayman Islands, Bahamas; 23 May (day 24): Haiti, Dominican Republic, Puerto Rico; 24 May (day 25): British Virgin Islands, U.S. Virgin Islands, Saint Kitts and Nevis; 25 May (day 26): Antigua and Barbuda, Dominica, Saint Lucia; 26 May (day 27): Saint Vincent and the Grenadines, Barbados, Grenada; 27 May (day 28): Trinidad and Tobago, Aruba, Panama	2014 Summer Youth Olympics torch relay is located in Caribbean
28 May (day 29): Colombia, Guyana, Venezuela; 29 May (day 30): Brazil, Suriname, Ecuador; 30 May (day 31): Peru, Bolivia, Paraguay; 31 May (day 32): Argentina; 1 June (day 33): Uruguay, Chile, Cape Verde	2014 Summer Youth Olympics torch relay is located in South America
2 June (day 34): Morocco, Algeria, Tunisia; 3 June (day 35): Libya, Egypt, Eritrea; 4 June (day 36): Djibouti, Somalia, Ethiopia; 5 June (day 37): Sudan, Chad, Niger; 6 June (day 38): Mali, Mauritania, Senegal; 7 June (day 39): Gambia, Guinea-Bissau, Guinea; 8 June (day 40): Sierra Leone, Liberia, Côte d'Ivoire; 9 June (day 41): Burkina Faso, Ghana, Togo; 10 June (day 42): Benin, Nigeria, São Tomé and Príncipe; 11 June (day 43): Gabon, Equatorial Guinea, Cameroon; 12 June (day 44): Central African Republic, Republic of the Congo, Democratic Republic of the Congo; 13 June (day 45): Burundi, Rwanda, Uganda; 14 June (day 46): Kenya, Tanzania, Malawi; 15 June (day 47): Zambia, Angola, Namibia; 16 June (day 48): Botswana, Zimbabwe, Mozambique; 17 June (day 49): Swaziland, South Africa, Lesotho; 18 June (day 50): Madagascar, Mauritius, Comoros; 19 June (day 51): Seychelles, Australia, Tonga	2014 Summer Youth Olympics torch relay is located in Africa
20 June (day 52): New Zealand, Cook Islands, American Samoa; 21 June (day 53): Samoa, Fiji, Vanuatu; 22 June (day 54): Solomon Islands, Tuvalu, Nauru; 23 June (day 55): Kiribati, Marshall Islands, Federated States of Micronesia; 24 June (day 56): Guam, Palau, Papua New Guinea	2014 Summer Youth Olympics torch relay is located in Oceania
25 June (day 57): Timor-Leste, Indonesia, Malaysia; 26 June (day 58): Singapore; 27 June (day 59): Brunei Darussalam, Maldives, Sri Lanka; 28 June (day 60): Yemen, Oman, United Arab Emirates; 29 June (day 61): Qatar, Bahrain, Kuwait; 30 June (day 62): Palestine, Jordan, Saudi Arabia; 1 July (day 63): Lebanon, Syria, Iran; 2 July (day 64): Iraq, Turkmenistan, Uzbekistan; 3 July (day 65): Kazakhstan, Mongolia, Kyrgyzstan; 4 July (day 66): Afghanistan, Tajikistan, Pakistan; 5 July (day 67): India, Nepal, Bhutan; 6 July (day 68): Bangladesh, Myanmar, Thailand; 7 July (day 69): Laos, Cambodia, Vietnam; 8 July (day 70): Philippines, Chinese Taipei, Japan; 9 July (day 71): South Korea, North Korea, Hong Kong	2014 Summer Youth Olympics torch relay is located in Asia
10 July (day 72): Macau, Hainan; 11 July (day 73): Guangdong; 12 July (day 74): Fujian, Jiangxi; 13 July (day 75): Hubei, Hunan; 14 July (day 76): Guangxi, Guizhou; 15 July (day 77): Chongqing; 16 July (day 78): Sichuan; 17 July (day 79): Yunnan; 18 July (day 80): Tibet, Xinjiang; 19 July (day 81): Qinghai, Gansu; 20 July (day 82): Ningxia, Shaanxi; 21 July (day 83): Shanxi, Inner Mongolia; 22 July (day 84): Heilongjiang, Jilin; 23 July (day 85): Liaoning, Hebei; 24 July (day 86): Beijing; 25 July (day 87): Tianjin; 26 July (day 88): Henan, Shandong; 27 July (day 89): Anhui, Zhejiang; 28 July (day 90): Shanghai	2014 Summer Youth Olympics torch relay is located in China
29 July (day 91): Xuzhou, Lianyungang; 30 July (day 92): Lianyungang, Suqian; 31 July (day 93): Huai'an, Yancheng; 1 August (day 94): Yancheng, Yangzhou; 2 August (day 95): Taizhou, Nantong; 3 August (day 96): Nantong, Suzhou; 4 August (day 97): Wuxi, Changzhou; 5 August (day 98): Changzhou, Zhenjiang	
6–7 August: Jianye, Gulou; 7–8 August: Qinhuai; 8–9 August: Jiangning; 9–10 August: Luhe; 10–11 August: Pukou; 11–12 August: Qixia; 12–13 August: Lishui; 13–14 August: Gaochun; 14–15 August: Yuhuatai; 15–16 August: Xuanwu, Jianye	
