= 1992 Winter Olympics torch relay =

- Host city: Albertville, France
- Countries visited: Greece, France and Monaco
- Distance: 5,536 kilometres (3,440 mi)
- Torchbearers: 10,001
- Start date: December 14, 1991
- End date: February 8, 1992
- Torch designer: Philippe Starck

The 1992 Winter Olympics torch relay took part as part of the build-up to the 1992 Winter Olympics hosted in Albertville, France. The route covered around 5,536 kilometres (3,440 mi) and involved 5,500. Michel Platini and François-Cyrille Grange lit the cauldron at the opening ceremony.

== Torch ==
Designed by French artist, Philippe Starck. The torch resembles a horn of a bull or a flame (if turned upside down).

== Route ==
Date	Map
December 14, 1991 (day 1): Paris; December 15 (day 2): Fontainebleau	1992 Winter Olympics torch relay is located in Île-de-France (region)
December 16 (day 3): Orléans; December 17 (day 4): Tours	1992 Winter Olympics torch relay is located in Centre-Val de Loire
December 18 (day 5): Poitiers; December 19 (day 6): Niort; December 20 (day 7): La Rochelle	1992 Winter Olympics torch relay is located in Nouvelle-Aquitaine
December 21 (day 8): La Roche-sur-Yon; December 22 (day 9): Nantes	1992 Winter Olympics torch relay is located in Pays de la Loire
December 23 (day 10): Redon; December 24 (day 11): Rennes	1992 Winter Olympics torch relay is located in Brittany
December 25 (day 12): Avranches; December 26 (day 13): Caen; December 27 (day 14): Le Havre; December 28 (day 15): Rouen	1992 Winter Olympics torch relay is located in Normandy
December 29 (day 16): Amiens; December 30 (day 17): Arras; December 31 (Day 18): Lille; January 1, 1992 (day 19): Cambrai; January 2 (day 20): Laon	1992 Winter Olympics torch relay is located in Hauts-de-France
January 3 (day 21): Châlons-en-Champagne; January 4 (day 22): Metz; January 5 (day 23): Nancy; January 6 (day 24): Sarrebourg; January 7 (day 25): Strasbourg; January 8 (day 26): Colmar	1992 Winter Olympics torch relay is located in Grand Est
January 9 (day 27): Belfort; January 10 (day 28): Besançon; January 11 (day 29): Dijon; January 12 (day 30): Autun	1992 Winter Olympics torch relay is located in Bourgogne-Franche-Comté
January 13 (day 31): Moulins; January 14 (day 32): Clermont-Ferrand	1992 Winter Olympics torch relay is located in Auvergne-Rhône-Alpes
January 15 (day 33): Aubusson; January 16 (day 34): Limoges; January 17 (day 35): Périgueux; January 18 (day 36): Bordeaux; January 19 (day 37): Mont-de-Marsan	1992 Winter Olympics torch relay is located in Nouvelle-Aquitaine
January 20 (day 38): Tarbes; January 21 (day 39): Auch; January 22 (day 40): Toulouse; January 23 (day 41): Albi; January 24 (day 42): Carcassonne; January 25 (day 43): Béziers; January 26 (day 44): Montpellier	1992 Winter Olympics torch relay is located in Occitanie
January 26 (day 44): Bastia; January 27 (day 45): Corte; January 28 (day 46): Ajaccio	1992 Winter Olympics torch relay is located in Corsica
January 28 (day 46): Nice; January 29 (day 47): Toulon; January 29 (day 47): Marseille; January 30 (day 48): Avignon	1992 Winter Olympics torch relay is located in Provence-Alpes-Côte d'Azur
January 31 (day 49): Montélimar; February 1 (day 50): Valence; February 2 (day 51): Saint-Étienne; February 3 (day 52): Lyon; February 4 (day 53): Belley; February 5 (day 54): Grenoble; February 6 (day 55): Saint-Jean-de-Maurienne; February 7 (day 56): Chambéry; February 8 (Day 57): Albertville; February 8 (Day 57): Théâtre des Cérémonies	1992 Winter Olympics torch relay is located in Auvergne-Rhône-Alpes
