= Ralph Lavers =

British painter

- Born: 7 September 1907; Broken Hill, New South Wales, Australia
- Died: 8 March 1969 (aged 61); Hastings, England
- Occupation: Painter

Ralph Lavers (7 September 1907 – 8 March 1969) was a British painter, machinist, architect and sculpture artist. He was born in 1907 in Broken Hill, NSW, Australia to Henry and Lillian Lavers. Little is known of his early life but by the early 1930s he was participating in archaeological excavations in Egypt.

In the 1930–31 season he was at Amarna with John Pendlebury as director. Others in the excavation party that year included Pendlebury's wife Hilda, architect and photographer Hilary Waddington, C. J. Bennett and notably, Mary Chubb. Chubb documented the season's dig in her 1954 book, Nefertiti Lived Here, which was illustrated by Lavers. At the end of the season, both Lavers and Chubb sailed for Athens.

In 1932–33 season he was again at Amarna where John Pendlebury was director. Others in the excavation party that year included Pendlebury's wife Hilda, New Zealand poet Charles Brasch, RAF engineer Stephen Sherman. Brasch described Lavers as coming to the dig 'primarily as John's drinking companion - as friends, a rather improbable pair':

Ralph was short, stocky, plumpish, with a soft boyish face, and usually looked rather scruffy, partly from the way he wore his clothes, often from a hangover... He was untidy; his socks hung down; he would push his hat to the back of his head, and often scratched his head in reflective puzzlement; one liked him instinctively; he invited friendliness and good-natured tolerance.

He won the Bernard Webb prize and travelled to The British School at Rome in 1935.

His work was part of the painting event in the art competition at the 1948 Summer Olympics.
