= 1988 Winter Olympics torch relay =

- Host city: Calgary, Canada
- Countries visited: Greece, Canada
- Distance: 18,000 km
- Torchbearers: 6,214
- Start date: 15 November 1987
- End date: 13 February 1988

The 1988 Winter Olympics torch relay was run from November 15, 1987, to February 13, 1988, prior to the Calgary 1988 Winter Olympics.

== Organization ==
The planning of the Torch Relay required significant research and testing, with each kilometer of the relay test-driven three times, and estimates that each torch bearer would travel at a speed of 7 km/h. The relay kept to secondary highways as much as possible and used snowmobiles for 2,750 km between Shanty Bay, Ontario and Prince Albert, Saskatchewan. Overall the torch travelled approximately 11,000 km on land and 7,000 km by air or sea.

Relay sponsor Petro Canada issued entry forms allowing citizens the chance to become one of 6,214 people to carry the torch for 1 kilometre (0.62 mi), torch bears were either chosen on merit or selected through random draws. Organizers, who initially expected to receive 250,000 entries, were inundated with over 6.6 million forms and called the response a sign that the Olympics had "fired the imagination of Canada". Part of the success for the number of applications was the OCO in February 1987 sending approximately 10 million applications out to virtually every Canadian household. The relay, called "Share the Flame", also saw the torch travel by boat, snowmobile and dogsled.

The Olympic Torch relay involved a convoy of 80 people in 40 support vehicles travelling 125 kilometers per day.

== Relay ==
The Olympic torch relay began when the torch was lit at Olympia and Greek runner Stelios Bisbas began what was called "the longest torch run in history". The flame arrived in St. John's, Newfoundland on the Atlantic Ocean two days later and over 88 days, traveled west across Canada. It passed through each provincial capital and many major cities, north to the Arctic Ocean at Inuvik, Northwest Territories, then west to the Pacific Ocean at Victoria, British Columbia before returning east to Alberta, and finally Calgary. The route was designed in a way that 90 per cent of Canadians lived within a 2-hour drive of the route. The torch covered a distance of 18,000 kilometres (11,000 mi), the greatest distance for a torch relay in Olympic history until the 2000 Sydney Games, and a sharp contrast to the 1976 Montreal Games when the relay covered only 775 kilometres (482 mi).

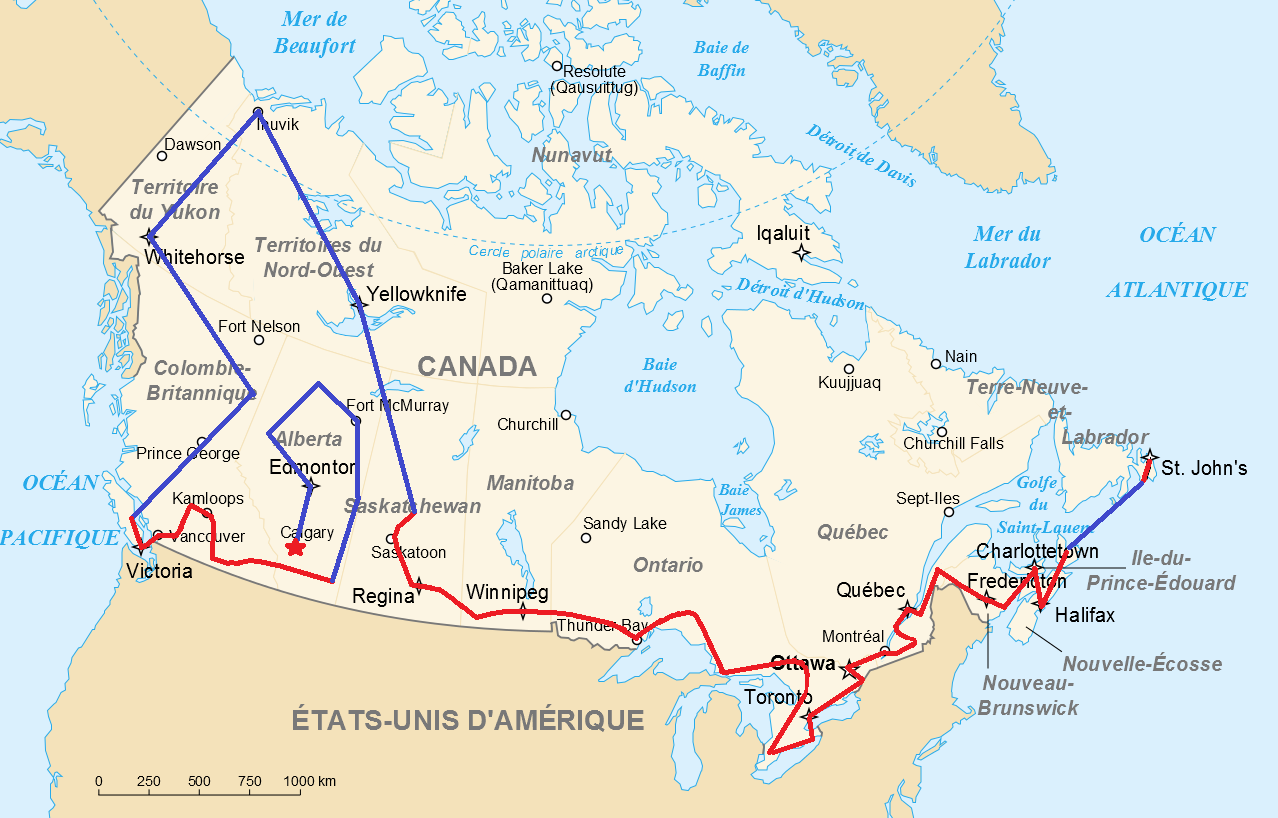
Map of torch relay, starting from St. John's in the East. (Key: land, air.)

The identity of the final torchbearer who would light the Olympic cauldron was one of OCO'88's most closely guarded secrets. The relay began at St. John's with Barbara Ann Scott, a 1948 gold medalist in figure skating and Ferd Hayward, the first Newfoundlander to represent Canada at an Olympic games in 1952, both representing Canada's past Olympians. The relay and ended with Ken Read and Cathy Priestner carrying the torch into McMahon Stadium representing the nation's current Olympians. They then stopped to acknowledge the contribution of para-athlete Rick Hansen and his "Man in Motion" tour before handing the torch to 12-year-old Robyn Perry, an aspiring figure skater who was selected to represent future Olympians, to light the cauldron. The choice of Perry was an unusual departure from most Games as the cauldron has typically been lit by a famous individual or group from the host nation.

== Protest ==
The relay was subject to peaceful protests by members and supporters of the Lubicon Cree First Nation at several stops in Ontario and Alberta in protest of ongoing land claim disputes between the band and the Crown, and against relay sponsor Petro Canada drilling for oil on traditional Lubicon land, as well as discontent over an exhibit at Calgary's Glenbow Museum called "The Spirit Sings" that featured numerous artifacts stolen from native land.

== Olympic Torch ==
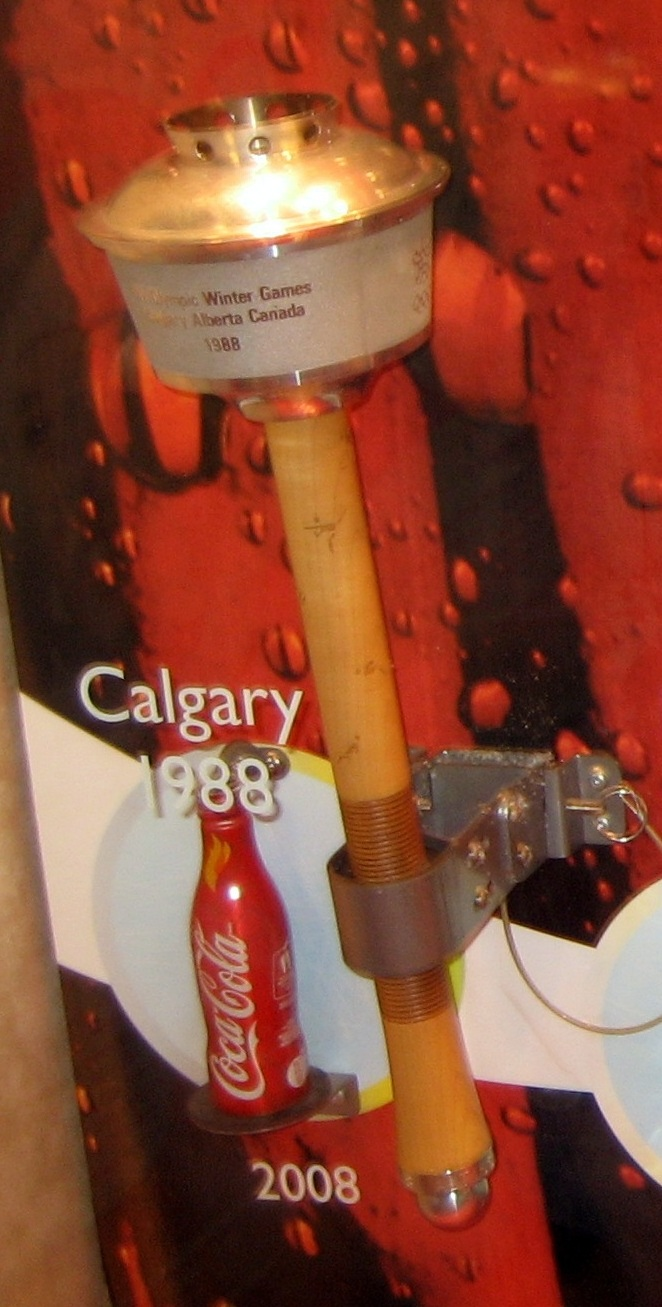
The Olympic torch on display

The design of the Olympic Torch for the Calgary games was influenced by the landmark building of the Calgary skyline, the Calgary Tower. The National Research Council Canada developed the design for the Torch, which was constructed of maple, aluminum, and hardened steel, entirely Canadian materials, the torch was designed to remain lit despite the sometimes adverse conditions of Canadian winters. The Torch had to be light enough for relay runners to carry comfortably, and the final design came in at 60 centimeters in length and 1.7 kilograms in weight. The maple handle portion included laser-incised pictograms of the 10 official Olympic Winter sports, and lettering was engraved on the steel cauldron portion. The torch used a combination of gasoline, kerosene and alcohol to allow a continuous burn during the unpredictable Canadian winter. Approximately 100 torches were manufactured for the Games.

The Calgary Tower itself was retrofitted to install a cauldron at its peak and was lit for the duration of the Games, one of several "replica cauldrons" constructed at Olympic venues throughout Calgary and Canmore.

== Notable torch bearers ==
- Alwyn Morris - Montreal, Quebec - 1984 Olympic kayaking champion.
- Linda Thom - Kingston, Ontario - 1984 Olympic gold medalist in shooting.
- Ben Johnson - Toronto, Ontario - Day 37 - Canadian Olympic Sprinter.
- Angella Taylor-Issajenko - Toronto, Ontario - Day 37 - Canadian sprinter and silver medalist at the 1984 Olympic Games.
- Maurice Vachon - Montreal, Quebec - Canadian wrestler in the 1948 Summer Olympics and professional wrestler.
- Marilyn Brain - Moose Jaw, Saskatchewan - Canadian rower silver medalist in 1984 Summer Olympics.
- Lori Fung - Vancouver, British Columbia - Canadian gymnast won gold medal in 1984 Summer Olympics.

== Route ==
Date	Locations visited	Map
November 17	Newfoundland and Labrador: Signal Hill; St. John's; Holyrood	1988 Winter Olympics torch relay is located in Newfoundland
November 18	Holyrood; Placentia Nova Scotia: Sydney	1988 Winter Olympics torch relay is located in Nova Scotia
November 19	Sydney; St. Peter's	1988 Winter Olympics torch relay is located in Nova Scotia
November 20	St. Peter's; Antigonish	1988 Winter Olympics torch relay is located in Nova Scotia
November 21	Antigonish; Sheet Harbour	1988 Winter Olympics torch relay is located in Nova Scotia
November 22	Sheet Harbour; Port Dufferin; Dartmouth	1988 Winter Olympics torch relay is located in Nova Scotia
November 23	Dartmouth; Halifax; Truro	1988 Winter Olympics torch relay is located in Nova Scotia
November 24	Truro; Caribou Prince Edward Island: Wood Islands; Charlottetown	1988 Winter Olympics torch relay is located in Prince Edward Island
November 25	Charlottetown; Borden New Brunswick: Cape Tormentine	1988 Winter Olympics torch relay is located in New Brunswick
November 26	Cape Tormentine; Port Elgin Nova Scotia: Amherst New Brunswick: Sackville; Dorchester; St. Joseph; Dieppe; Moncton	1988 Winter Olympics torch relay is located in New Brunswick
November 27	Moncton; Riverview; Salisbury; Petitcodiac; Sussex; Apohaqui; Norton; Hampton	1988 Winter Olympics torch relay is located in New Brunswick
November 28	Hampton; Quispamsis; Saint John; Grand Bay; Oromocto	1988 Winter Olympics torch relay is located in New Brunswick
November 29	Oromocto; Fredericton; Woodstock	1988 Winter Olympics torch relay is located in New Brunswick
November 30	Woodstock; Hartland; Florenceville; Bristol; Bath; Perth-Andover; Grand Falls	1988 Winter Olympics torch relay is located in New Brunswick
December 1	Grand Falls; Edmundston; Saint-Jacques Quebec: Cabano	1988 Winter Olympics torch relay is located in Eastern Quebec
December 2	Cabano; Rivière-du-Loup; Kamouraska	1988 Winter Olympics torch relay is located in Eastern Quebec
December 3	Kamouraska; La Pocatière; Saint-Jean-Port-Joli; Montmagny; Saint-Michel-de-Bellechasse	1988 Winter Olympics torch relay is located in Eastern Quebec
December 4	Saint-Michel-de-Bellechasse; Quebec City; Donnacona	1988 Winter Olympics torch relay is located in Southern Quebec
December 5	Donnacona; Cap-Santé; Portneuf; Deschambault-Grondines; Sainte-Anne-de-la-Pérade; Batiscan; Champlain; Lac-à-la-Tortue; Grand-Mère; Shawinigan	1988 Winter Olympics torch relay is located in Southern Quebec
December 6	Shawinigan; Saint-Louis-de-France; Cap-de-la-Madeleine; Trois-Rivières; Pointe-du-Lac; Yamachiche; Louiseville; Maskinongé; Berthierville; Saint-Ignace-de-Loyola; Sorel-Tracy	1988 Winter Olympics torch relay is located in Southern Quebec
December 7	Sorel-Tracy; Drummondville; Saint-Cyrille-de-Wendover; Notre-Dame-du-Bon-Conseil; Sainte-Clotilde-de-Horton; Victoriaville	1988 Winter Olympics torch relay is located in Southern Quebec
December 8	Victoriaville; Arthabaska; Warwick; Kingsey Falls; Danville; Richmond; Windsor; Bromptonville; Fleurimont; Sherbrooke	1988 Winter Olympics torch relay is located in Southern Quebec
December 9	Sherbrooke; Rock Forest; Deauville; Omerville; Magog; Eastman; Waterloo; Granby; Saint-Paul; St. Pie	1988 Winter Olympics torch relay is located in Southern Quebec
December 10	St. Pie; Saint-Dominique; Saint-Hyacinthe; Sainte-Madeleine; Beloeil; McMasterville; Saint-Bruno-de-Montarville; Saint-Hubert; Longueuil; Saint-Lambert; Brossard; Greenfield Park; Chambly; Iberville	1988 Winter Olympics torch relay is located in Southern Quebec
December 11	Iberville; Saint-Jean-sur-Richelieu; Saint-Luc; La Prairie; Candiac; Delson; Saint-Constant; Sainte-Catherine; Kahnawake; Châteauguay; Melocheville; Saint-Timothée; Salaberry-de-Valleyfield; Coteau-du-Lac	1988 Winter Olympics torch relay is located in Southern Quebec
December 12	Dorion; Pincourt; L'Île-Perrot; Sainte-Anne-de-Bellevue; Baie-D'Urfé; Beaconsfield; Pointe Claire; Dorval; Lachine; Montreal; Repentigny	1988 Winter Olympics torch relay is located in Southern Quebec
December 13	Repentigny; Montreal; Saint-Léonard; Saint-Laurent; Pierrefonds; Laval; Saint-Eustache	1988 Winter Olympics torch relay is located in Southern Quebec
December 14	Saint-Eustache; Laval; Lachute; Pointe-au-Chêne	1988 Winter Olympics torch relay is located in Southern Quebec
December 15	Pointe-au-Chêne; Papineauville; Plaisance; Thurso; Masson; Gatineau; Hull	1988 Winter Olympics torch relay is located in Southern Quebec
December 16	Hull Ontario: Ottawa; Casselman; Monkland; Bonville; St. Andrews; Cornwall	1988 Winter Olympics torch relay is located in Southern Ontario
December 17	Cornwall; Ingleside; Morrisburg; Iroquois; Cardinal; Johnstown; Prescott; Maitland; Brockville	1988 Winter Olympics torch relay is located in Southern Ontario
December 18	Brockville; Lyn; Mallorytown; Waterton; Gananoque; Kingston; Amherstview; Millhaven	1988 Winter Olympics torch relay is located in Southern Ontario
December 19	Millhaven; Morven; Napanee; Deseronto; Marysville; Shannonville; Belleville; Colborne	1988 Winter Olympics torch relay is located in Southern Ontario
December 20	Colborne; Cobourg; Port Hope; Bewdley; Bailieboro; Fraserville; Peterborough; Omemee	1988 Winter Olympics torch relay is located in Southern Ontario
December 21	Omemee; Newcastle; Bowmanville; Oshawa; Whitby; Ajax; Pickering	1988 Winter Olympics torch relay is located in Southern Ontario
December 22	Pickering; Markham; Unionville; Whitchurch-Stouffville; Newmarket; Richmond Hill	1988 Winter Olympics torch relay is located in Southern Ontario
December 23	Richmond Hill; Toronto; Mississauga; Clarkson	1988 Winter Olympics torch relay is located in Southern Ontario
December 24	Clarkson; Oakville; Bronte; Burlington; Waterdown; Clappisons Corners; Dundas; Copetown; Lynden; Osborne Corners; Paris	1988 Winter Olympics torch relay is located in Southern Ontario
December 25	Paris; Brantford; Cainsville; Langford; Alberton; Ancaster; Hamilton; Stoney Creek	1988 Winter Olympics torch relay is located in Southern Ontario
December 26	Stoney Creek; Fruitland; Grimsby; Beamsville; Vineland; Jordan; St. Catharines; Niagara-on-the-Lake; Virgil; St. Davids; Niagara Falls; Fort Erie	1988 Winter Olympics torch relay is located in Southern Ontario
December 27	Fort Erie; Gasline; Port Colborne; Welland; Thorold; Pelham; Fonthill; Ridgeville; Fenwick; West Lincoln; Wellandport; Dunnville	1988 Winter Olympics torch relay is located in Southern Ontario
December 28	Dunnville; Canborough; Canfield; Cayuga; Decewsville; Nelles Corners; Balmoral; Jarvis; Renton; Simcoe; Delhi; Courtland; Tillsonburg; Aylmer	1988 Winter Olympics torch relay is located in Southern Ontario
December 29	Aylmer; St. Thomas; Rodney	1988 Winter Olympics torch relay is located in Southern Ontario
December 30	Rodney; Highgate; Ridgetown; Blenheim; Cedar Springs; Wheatley; Leamington	1988 Winter Olympics torch relay is located in Southern Ontario
December 31	Leamington; Kingsville; Harrow; Malden Centre; Amherstburg; River Canard; Sandwich West; Windsor; Tecumseh	1988 Winter Olympics torch relay is located in Southern Ontario
January 1	Tecumseh; Puce; Emeryville; Belle River; St. Joachim; Tilbury; Chatham	1988 Winter Olympics torch relay is located in Southern Ontario
January 2	Chatham; Wallaceburg; Port Lambton; Sombra; Sarnia; Reece's Corners	1988 Winter Olympics torch relay is located in Southern Ontario
January 3	Reece's Corners; Wyoming; Petrolia; Watford; Strathroy; London	1988 Winter Olympics torch relay is located in Southern Ontario
January 4	London; Stratford; Shakespeare; New Hamburg	1988 Winter Olympics torch relay is located in Southern Ontario
January 5	New Hamburg; Petersburg; Kitchener; Cambridge; Guelph; Orangeville	1988 Winter Olympics torch relay is located in Southern Ontario
January 6	Orangeville; Tottenham; Alliston; CFB Borden; Barrie; Shanty Bay	1988 Winter Olympics torch relay is located in Ontario
January 7	Shanty Bay; Hawkestone; Orillia; Severn Bridge; Kahshe Lake; Gravenhurst; Bracebridge; Huntsville; Melissa; Novar; Katrine; Sundridge; South River; Trout Creek; Powassan; Callander	1988 Winter Olympics torch relay is located in Ontario
January 8	Callander; North Bay; Nipissing; Sturgeon Falls; Verner; Warren; Hagar; Markstay; Wahnapitae; Coniston; Sudbury; Nairn Centre; McKerrow	1988 Winter Olympics torch relay is located in Ontario
January 9	McKerrow; Walford; Spanish; Cutler; Serpent River; Spragge; Algoma Mills; Blind River; Iron Bridge; Thessalon; Bruce Mines; Desbarats; Echo Bay; Garden River; Sault Ste. Marie; Heyden	1988 Winter Olympics torch relay is located in Ontario
January 10	Heyden; Batchawana Bay; Montreal River Harbour; Wawa; White River	1988 Winter Olympics torch relay is located in Ontario
January 11	White River; Marathon; Terrace Bay; Schreiber; Pays Plat First Nation; Nipigon	1988 Winter Olympics torch relay is located in Ontario
January 12	Nipigon; Thunder Bay; Shabaqua Corners	1988 Winter Olympics torch relay is located in Ontario
January 13	Shabaqua Corners; Dryden	1988 Winter Olympics torch relay is located in Ontario
January 14	Dryden; Kenora; Keewatin Manitoba: Ste. Anne outskirts of Winnipeg	
January 15	Winnipeg; Elie; Portage la Prairie; MacGregor; Carberry outskirts of Brandon	1988 Winter Olympics torch relay is located in Manitoba
January 16	Brandon; Oak Lake; Virden; Elkhorn Saskatchewan: Whitewood; Grenfell; Indian Head	1988 Winter Olympics torch relay is located in Manitoba
January 17	Indian Head; Regina; Moose Jaw; Davidson	1988 Winter Olympics torch relay is located in Saskatchewan
January 18	Davidson; Bladworth; Kenaston; Hanley; Dundurn; Saskatoon; Warman; Hague; Rosthern; Duck Lake; Prince Albert	1988 Winter Olympics torch relay is located in Saskatchewan
January 19	Northwest Territories: Yellowknife; Inuvik Yukon: Whitehorse British Columbia: Fort St. John	1988 Winter Olympics torch relay is located in Northwest Territories 1988 Winter Olympics torch relay is located in Yukon
January 20	Fort St. John; Prince George; Campbell River; Courtenay	1988 Winter Olympics torch relay is located in British Columbia
January 21	Courtenay; Qualicum Beach; Parksville; Nanaimo	1988 Winter Olympics torch relay is located in Vancouver Island
January 22	Nanaimo; Ladysmith; Duncan; Mill Bay; Victoria	1988 Winter Olympics torch relay is located in Vancouver Island
January 23	Victoria; Sidney; Tsawwassen; Richmond; Vancouver	1988 Winter Olympics torch relay is located in Vancouver Island
January 24	Vancouver; New Westminster; Surrey; Langley; Aldergrove; Clearbrook	1988 Winter Olympics torch relay is located in Vancouver Island
January 25	Clearbrook; Chilliwack; Popkum; Hope; Yale; Spuzzum	1988 Winter Olympics torch relay is located in British Columbia
January 26	Spuzzum; Lytton; Ashcroft Manor Ranch	1988 Winter Olympics torch relay is located in British Columbia
January 27	Ashcroft Manor Ranch; Cache Creek; Kamloops; Monte Creek	1988 Winter Olympics torch relay is located in British Columbia
January 28	Monte Creek; Vernon; Kelowna	1988 Winter Olympics torch relay is located in British Columbia
January 29	Kelowna; Summerland; Oliver	1988 Winter Olympics torch relay is located in British Columbia
January 30	Oliver; Osoyoos; Greenwood	1988 Winter Olympics torch relay is located in British Columbia
January 31	Greenwood; Grand Forks; Warfield	1988 Winter Olympics torch relay is located in British Columbia
February 1	Warfield; Trail; Salmo; Creston	1988 Winter Olympics torch relay is located in British Columbia
February 2	Creston; Cranbrook	1988 Winter Olympics torch relay is located in British Columbia
February 3	Cranbrook; Jaffray; Fernie; Sparwood	1988 Winter Olympics torch relay is located in British Columbia
February 4	Sparwood Alberta: Coleman; Brocket	1988 Winter Olympics torch relay is located in British Columbia
February 5	Brocket; Fort Macleod; Lethbridge	1988 Winter Olympics torch relay is located in Alberta
February 6	Lethbridge; Coaldale; Chin; Cranford; Barnwell; Taber; Purple Springs; Grassy Lake; Burdett; Bow Island	1988 Winter Olympics torch relay is located in Alberta
February 7	Bow Island; Medicine Hat; Lloydminster	1988 Winter Olympics torch relay is located in Alberta
February 8	Lloydminster; Fort McMurray	1988 Winter Olympics torch relay is located in Alberta
February 9	Fort McMurray; Fort Vermilion; Grande Prairie; Namao	1988 Winter Olympics torch relay is located in Alberta
February 10	Namao; St. Albert; Edmonton; Leduc; Wetaskiwin	1988 Winter Olympics torch relay is located in Alberta
February 11	Wetaskiwin; Ponoka; Lacombe; Red Deer	1988 Winter Olympics torch relay is located in Alberta
February 12	Red Deer; Innisfail; Bowden; Olds; Carstairs; Crossfield; Airdrie	1988 Winter Olympics torch relay is located in Alberta
February 13	Airdrie; Calgary	1988 Winter Olympics torch relay is located in Alberta
