= 1980 Summer Olympics torch relay =

- Host city: Moscow, Russian SFSR, Soviet Union (now Russia)
- Countries visited: Greece, Bulgaria, Romania, Soviet Union (now Moldova, Ukraine, Belarus, Estonia, Russia)
- Distance: 5,000 kilometres (3,100 mi)
- Torchbearers: 5,435
- Start date: June 19, 1980
- End date: July 19, 1980
- Torch designer: Boris Tutschin

The 1980 Summer Olympics torch relay was run from June 19, 1980 until July 19, 1980 prior to the 1980 Summer Olympics in Moscow. The route covered around 5,000 kilometres (3,100 mi) and involved over 5,435 torchbearers. Basketball player and Olympic champion Sergei Belov lit the cauldron at the opening ceremony.

== Route ==
Route	Map
Olympia; Patras; Corinth; Athens; Thebes; Larissa; Veria; Thessaloniki; Serres	1980 Summer Olympics torch relay is located in Greece
Blagoevgrad; Sofia; Plovdiv; Shipka; Veliko Tarnovo; Pleven; Ruse	1980 Summer Olympics torch relay is located in Bulgaria
Giurgiu; Bucharest; Ploiești; Buzău; Bacău; Roman; Iași	1980 Summer Olympics torch relay is located in Romania
Leușeni; Chișinău; Bălți; Chernivtsi; Khmelnytskyi; Vinnytsia; Zhytomyr; Kiev; Lubny; Poltava; Chutove Raion; Kharkiv; Belgorod; Kursk; Kromy; Orel; Tula; Serpukhov; Podolsk; Moscow; July 20: Offshoots of the flame taken to competition sites: Minsk; Leningrad; Tallinn; Kiev	1980 Summer Olympics torch relay is located in the European Soviet Union
