= 2018 Winter Olympics torch relay =

- Host city: Pyeongchang, South Korea
- Countries visited: Greece, South Korea
- Distance: 2,018 km
- Torchbearers: 7,500
- Start date: 24 October 2017
- End date: 9 February 2018

The 2018 Winter Olympics torch relay was run from October 24, 2017, until February 9, 2018, in advance of the 2018 Winter Olympics. After being lit in Olympia, Greece, the torch traveled to Athens on 31 October. The torch began its Korean journey on 1 November, visiting all regions of Korea. The Korean leg began in Incheon International Airport: the torch travelled across the country for 101 days. 7,500 relay runners participated in the torch relay over a distance of 2,018 kilometres (1,254 mi). The torchbearers each carried the flame for 200 metres (660 ft). The relay ended in Pyeongchang's Olympic Stadium, the main venue of the 2018 Olympics. The final torch was lit by figure skater Yuna Kim.

== Route in Greece ==
=== October 24 ===
- Olympia

=== October 25 ===
- Pyrgos
- Amaliada
- Kalavryta
- Patras

=== October 26 ===
- Rio
- Antirio
- Missolonghi
- Agrinio
- Arta
- Ioannina

=== October 27 ===
- Grevena
- Kozani
- Kastoria

=== October 28 ===
- Florina
- Edessa
- Giannitsa
- Thessaloniki

=== October 29 ===
- Kilkis
- Rodopoli
- Sidirokastro
- Serres
- Drama
- Naousa

=== October 30 ===
- Veria
- Katerini
- Litochoro
- Larissa
- Delphi

=== October 31 ===
- Arachova
- Livadeia
- Eleusis
- Athens
- Panathenaic Stadium

== Route in South Korea ==
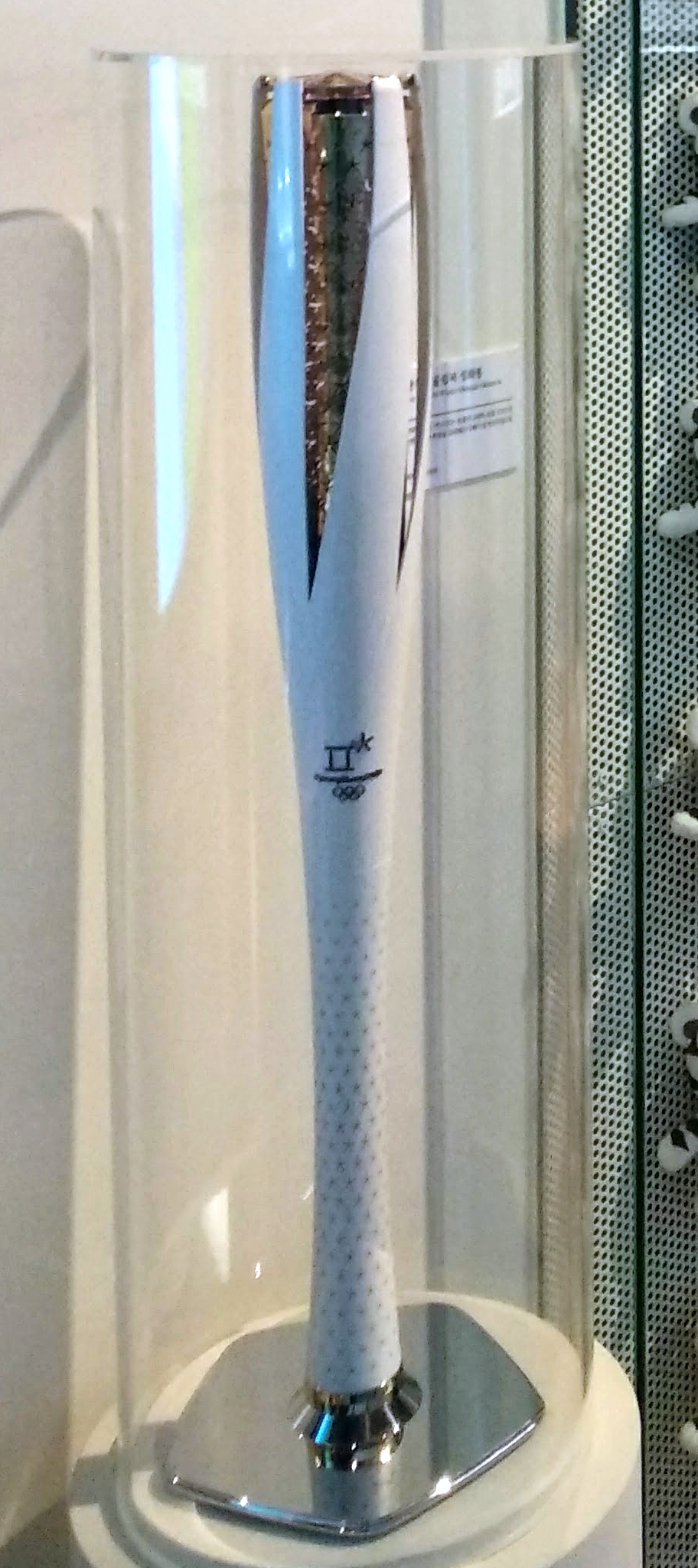
2018 Winter Olympics torch

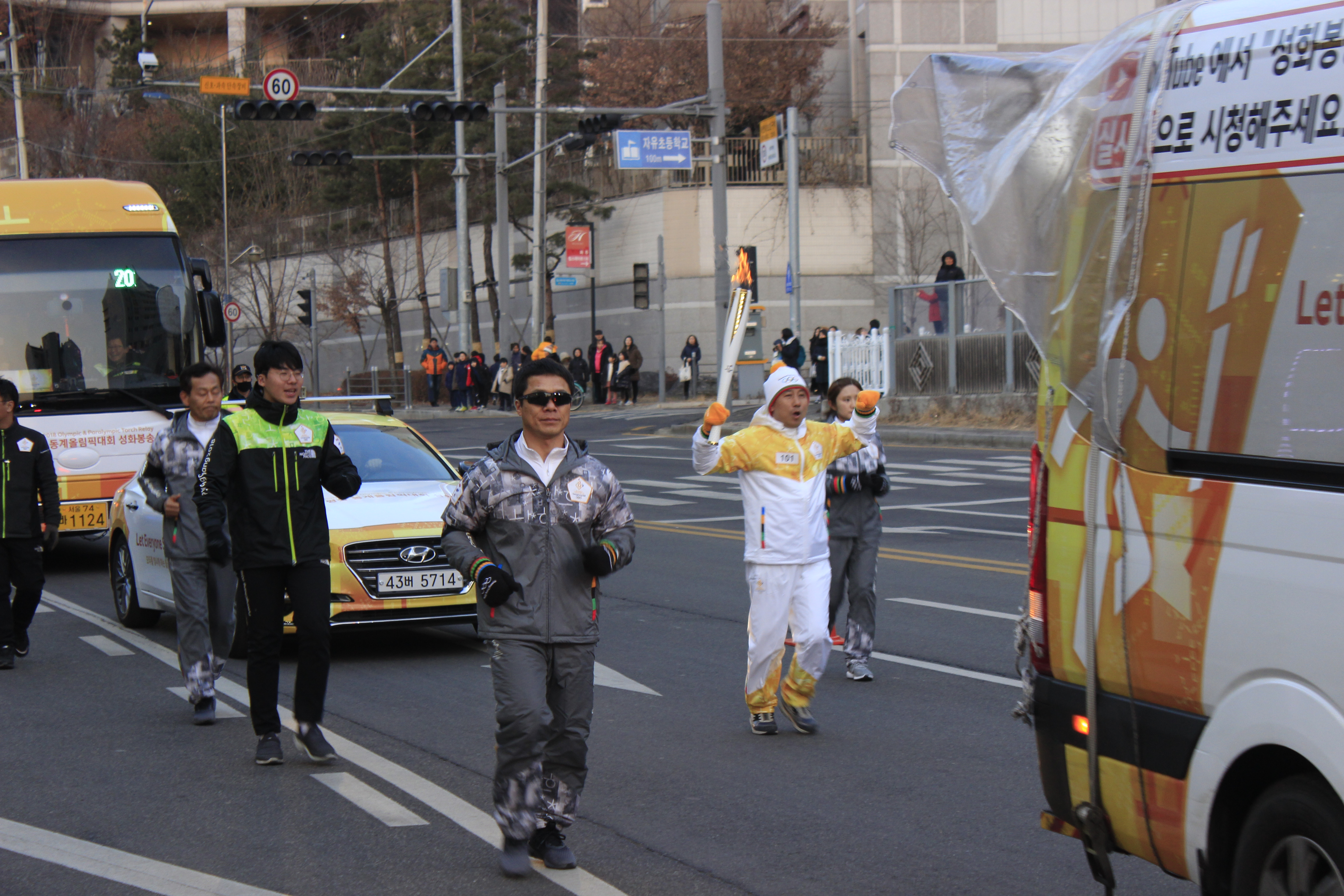
PyeongChang 2018 Olympic torch relay in Paju

November 1
1. Incheon
November 2
2. Jeju
November 3
3. Seogwipo
November 4–6
4. Busan

November 8–10
5. Ulsan

November 11
6. Gimhae
November 12
7. Geoje
November 13
8. Tongyeong
November 14
9. Changwon
November 15
10. Miryang
11. Changnyeong
November 16
12. Sacheon
13. Jinju

November 18
14. Gwangyang

November 19
15. Yeosu
November 20
16. Suncheon
November 21
17. Gangjin
18. Jangheung
19. Jindo
20. Sinan
21. Mokpo
November 22
22. Naju
23. Hwasun

November 24–26
24. Gwangju

November 27
25. Damyang
26. Gokseong
November 28
27. Namwon
November 29
28. Imsil
November 30
29. Muju
December 1
30. Jeonju
December 2
31. Iksan
December 3
32. Gunsan

December 5
33. Buyeo

December 6
34. Taean
35. Hongseong
December 7
36. Dangjin
37. Seosan
December 8
38. Gongju
December 9–11
39. Daejeon
December 13–14
40. Sejong

December 16
41. Asan

December 17
42. Cheonan
December 18–19
43. Cheongju
December 20
44. Jincheon
December 21
45. Chungju

December 23
46. Danyang

December 24
47. Yeongju
December 25
48. Bonghwa
December 26
49. Andong
December 27
50. Gumi

December 29–31
51. Daegu

January 1
52. Pohang
January 2
53. Gyeongju

January 5
54. Suwon

January 6
55. Yongin
January 7
56. Gwangju
January 8
57. Seongnam

January 10–12
58. Incheon

January 13–16
59. Seoul

January 18
60. Goyang

January 19
61. Paju
January 20
62. Yeoncheon
January 21
63. Cheorwon
January 22
64. Hwacheon
January 23
65. Yanggu

January 25
66. Inje

January 26
67. Goseong
January 27
68. Sokcho
January 28
69. Yangyang
January 29
70. Chuncheon
January 30
71. Hongcheon
January 31
72. Hoengseong

February 2
73. Wonju

February 3
74. Yeongwol
February 4
75. Taebaek
February 5
76. Samcheok
February 6
77. Donghae
February 7
78. Jeongseon
February 8
79. Gangneung
February 9
80. Pyeongchang
