= Jecheon building fire =

2017 fire in Jecheon, South Korea

- Jecheon building fire (South Korea)
- Date: 21 December 2017
- Venue: Duson Sporium
- Location: Jecheon, South Korea; 37°08′25″N 128°11′58″E
- Type: Structure fire
- Cause: Faulty wiring
- First reporter: Jecheon Fire Department
- Deaths: 29
- Injuries: 36

A major fire occurred on 21 December 2017, at the Duson Sporium sport center (두손스포리움, Duson Seupolium) in Jecheon, South Korea, killing at least 29 people and injuring another 36. Twenty of those killed were trapped in a sauna on the second floor of the building, which also housed a variety of other commercial establishments including a gym, a golf practice facility, and a number of restaurants.

Around 20 people were rescued from the roof. Preliminary reports indicated that victims were incapacitated by toxic smoke, which was produced so quickly that they were unable to evacuate; smoke inhalation was also the cause of many injuries. Rescue operations were delayed due to the continued presence of toxic gas and exceptionally thick smoke.

== Summary ==
On 21 December 2017, at 15:53 (KST), a vehicle in Duson Sporium caught on fire from electric heating wires being installed in the first-floor ceiling of the parking lot, in turn setting the eight-story building itself on fire. Jecheon Fire Department arrived at 16:00 (KST), but were unable to approach because of the explosion risk of the vehicle and LP gas tank on the first floor. The accident killed 29 people and injured 36 people.

=== Cause ===
The crime lab concluded that the fire was started by a spark in the heating wires that were being installed in the ceiling pipes on the first floor parking lot. The ceiling structures then collapsed on a parked vehicle, further expanding the fire to other parked vehicles. In addition, the emergency exit on the second floor, where a women's sauna was located, was being used as a warehouse. Moreover, there were no employees to help evacuate and the automatic door at the main entrance was broken, making it harder for victims to escape and causing more casualties.

=== Civilian response ===
The building owner, Lee, tried to put out the fire with a fire extinguisher but failed, and entered the building to evacuate people. However, for fear that there would be naked women in the sauna, Lee refused to go inside and instead opted to warn people to evacuate by yelling outside the door.

A private ladder truck rescued people during the delay of the firefighting trucks' ladder installation. In addition, an elderly man helped rescue 15 people at the scene, but was later taken to the hospital.

=== Aftermath ===
On 25 December 2017, the police raided the homes of both the owner of the building and the manager to collect evidence that would help charge them with manslaughter caused by professional negligence and violation of the fire law. The police plan to seek arrest warrants for both.

== Reactions ==
President of South Korea, Moon Jae-in, voiced "deep sorrow", along with the Prime Minister of South Korea, Lee Nak-yeon, vowed to expedite the dispatching of rescue services to the location. Organizers of the 2018 Winter Olympics in Pyeongchang announced that a scheduled visit by the Olympic torch relay to Jecheon would be cancelled, and the route revised, due to the incident.

== Controversy and criticism ==
Some point out that the Jecheon fire department failed to properly deal with the fire. Victims escaped through the exit but the firemen did not approach the exit. In addition, no attempts were made to enter through the second floor's window and the fire engine's ladder was not installed properly. Some also criticized the lack of firefighting equipment and manpower, caused by the local government's negligence, which contributed to the disaster.

The firefighters believed that most of the victims had inhaled toxic gases and died early in the fire, however, a controversy arose when a family member claimed that they receive a phone call from the victim four hours after the fire broke out. The bereaved families criticized the fire department for having missed the emergency rescue golden time.
