= J.Y. Park =

South Korean singer and producer (born 1971)

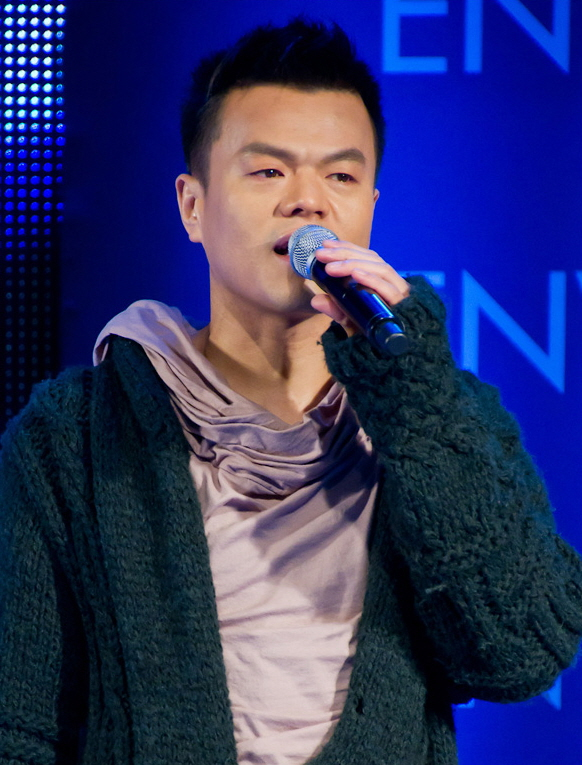
- Park in 2011
- Born: Park Jin-young; December 13, 1971 (age 54) (Note: Park Jin-young was born on December 13, 1971, while his registered birth date is January 13, 1972. Source:); Seoul, South Korea
- Other names: JYP; The Asiansoul
- Education: Yonsei University
- Occupations: Singer-songwriter; record producer; reality television judge; record executive
- Known for: Co-founder of JYP Entertainment
- Spouses: Seo Yoon-jeong (m. 1999; div. 2009); Unknown (m. 2013)
- Children: 2
- Musical career
- Genres: K-pop; funk; soul; R&B
- Instruments: Vocals; keyboards
- Years active: 1992–present
- Label: JYP

Korean name
- Hangul: 박진영
- RR: Bak Jinyeong
- MR: Pak Chinyŏng
- Website: jyp.jype.com

Park Jin-young (Korean: 박진영; born December 13, 1971), also known by his stage names J.Y. Park and The Asiansoul or the initials JYP, is a South Korean singer-songwriter, record producer, record executive, and reality television show judge. Park rose to stardom as a singer following the release of his 1994 debut album, Blue City. In 1997, he founded JYP Entertainment, which went on to become one of the most profitable entertainment agencies in South Korea.

As the head of JYP Entertainment from 1997 to 2011, Park has developed and managed successful K-pop artists including 2PM, Day6, Got7, Itzy, KickFlip, Miss A, Nmixx, Rain, Stray Kids, Twice, Xdinary Heroes and Wonder Girls, as well as Mandopop group Boy Story and J-pop groups Nexz and NiziU.

== Early life and education ==
Park was born in Gwangjin District, Seoul, South Korea. His father was a news correspondent based in the U.S. At age 9, Park moved with his mother to New York following his father's reassignment. They lived there for three years before Park returned to Seoul for high school. He later attended Yonsei University, during which time he released his first two albums. He graduated with a bachelor's in geology in 1996. He has an older sister. Park learned music composition and production for two years from Kim Hyung-suk, who is considered one of the best pop music composers and producers of all time in South Korea.

== Career ==
Park originally debuted as the trio boy group "Park Jin Young and the NG (New Generation)" (박진영과 신세대), with Kim Soo-chul as a producer, and members Cho Hye-sung and Yoon Tae-jin. Their first album 'Floating time' (떠도는 시간) was not successful. Park's notability within the Korean music industry began in 1994 when he debuted as a solo artist with the song "Don't Leave Me" (날 떠나지마) from his debut album Blue City. During this period, he met composer and long-time collaborator Bang Si-hyuk. In 1997, Park founded his label and agency JYP Entertainment, then known as Tae-Hong Planning Corp (대홍기획). That same year, he was tasked by EBM (now SidusHQ) with preparing the members of its project group for debut; the five-member act was eventually called g.o.d and debuted two years later. The success of g.o.d as one of the country's most popular and bestselling groups of the early 2000s would further establish Bang and Park's reputation as hit makers.

In 2004, Park ventured into the American music industry, becoming the first Asian producer to cross over to the U.S., producing music for Will Smith, Mase and Cassie.

In May 2008, Park collaborated with Jackie Chan to form the I Love Asia Project, prompted by the earthquake tragedy in China. Park produced the song "Smile Again" along with Chan and Korean director Kang Je-gyu to raise funds for relief efforts in Sichuan. The song featured an array of Korean talents including actors and singers as well as figure skater Kim Yuna. The music video was released on JYP Entertainment's YouTube channel on June 30.

In October 2009, Park became the first Korean songwriter, together with Rainstone, to reach the Billboard Hot 100 Chart with the Wonder Girls hit "Nobody" which debuted at No. 76.

On December 3, 2009, Park released his single "No Love No More". On April 22, 2011, Park collaborated with Brown Eyed Girls' Ga-In, releasing the duet track "Someone Else". The song charted at No. 2 on the Gaon Digital Chart and sold over a million copies. This was his first release in about two years. Park followed up his success with "Someone Else" by releasing the single "You're the One" on April 28, 2012. The song rose to No. 3 and sold over 1.5 million copies.

In 2015, Park released the song "Who's Your Mama?" featuring Lucky J's Jessi. The song became a hit, displacing fellow label-mates Miss A from first spot on the Korean charts. Later that year, he participated in the Infinite Challenge Yeongdong Expressway Music Festival, forming the duo Dancing Genome with comedian Yoo Jae-suk and releasing the song "I'm So Sexy".

In 2016, Park released a single titled 'Still Alive'. During the same period, he appeared in the Conan O'Brien special 'Conan in Korea', recording a song with Conan O'Brien, Steven Yeun & Park Ji-min titled 'Fire', with label-mates Wonder Girls and Twice appearing in the music video. The song was released on Conan O'Brien's YouTube channel on April 9. Park also appeared in the Korean variety show Sister's Slam Dunk in 2016, producing the cast's single titled 'Shut Up'. The song unexpectedly achieved a real-time chart all-kill upon release. On September 22, 2016, it was reported that Park would be producing the title track of girl-group I.O.I for their final album prior to disbandment. The song, titled "Very Very Very" was released on October 16, 2016. It achieved commercial success upon release, earning a perfect all-kill on the Korean charts and topping the Gaon Digital Chart. In 2019, Park released a song titled 'Fever' featured by Superbee and BIBI.

On August 11, 2020, Park released his autobiography, Live for What? One day later, Park released a new single, "When We Disco", which was a duet with Sunmi. This was his first collaboration with Sunmi since her departure from JYP Entertainment and the Wonder Girls. The single peaked at #3 at the Gaon Digital Chart, becoming his sixth Top 10 song in the chart.

On April 26, 2021, it was reported that Park and Psy, the founder of P Nation, will collaborate to form a new boy group each in Loud, which premiered on June 5, 2021, on SBS.

In November 2022, Park released the single "Groove Back", which was released on November 21, but the music video was released three days prior, according to the agency. Later Park confirmed he would hold a solo concert in Japan for the first time in 7 years at Pia Arena MM in Yokohama, on January 28 and 29, 2023. On September 16, 2024, a television special The KBS Grand Project — 30th Anniversary Special Entertainer JYP aired on KBS2. Celebrating the 30th anniversary of Park's debut, it featured appearances from g.o.d, Rain, Sunye, Sunmi, 2PM and Twice.

Park Jin-young is celebrating his 30th debut anniversary with a solo concert, Still JYP. The concert, scheduled for December 27 to 29 at Olympic Hall in Seoul, features his greatest hits and is designed to appeal to fans of all ages. Additional tickets are available for purchase through Interpark, YES24, and Naver Reservations. Park Jin-young's legacy continues to thrive, with international performances planned.

On September 9, 2025, Park was appointed as the co-chairman (minister level) of the Popular Culture Exchange Committee directly under the president, Lee Jae Myung. On March 10, 2026, Park announced he will be stepping down from JYP Entertainment's company board and focusing on his role as the co-chair of Popular Culture Exchange Committee, planning to focus on creative work as an artist, mentoring younger artists, and participating in other external activities related to the K-pop industry.

In July 2026, Park announced his first summer-themed single in six years titled "Wet", which will also serve as the official theme song of Waterbomb 2026. He described the single as a blend of raggae-inspired sounds inspired by the Waterbomb festival's atmosphere. The single was released on July 23, 2026.

=== Acting ===
In early 2011, JYP made his acting debut in Dream High, for which he received a nomination for New Actor of the Year at the Baeksang Arts Awards. In January 2012, he was seen in the sequel to Dream High called Dream High 2.

In 2011, Park made his film debut as Choi Young In, a man on a mission to hand-deliver 5 million dollars, in Five Million Dollar Man with Jo Sung-ha and Min Hyo-rin. The film was released on July 19, 2012.

== Personal life ==
=== Relationships ===
In 1999, Park Jin-young married Seo Yoon-jeong. In March 2009, the couple announced their divorce. On October 10, 2013, he married a woman nine years younger than him. On January 25, 2019, his daughter was born, and Park wrote "This Small Hand" for her and his father, with a documentary-style music video released on February 9. In the music video, it was revealed that his father was in the late stage of Alzheimer's disease and could no longer recognize him. All proceeds from the song went to the Green Umbrella Foundation (ChildFund Korea) to help children in need.

=== Religion ===
Park is a born-again Christian and leads weekly Bible practices. According to Park, he had turned to several faiths to fill the "void in [his] heart" after his divorce before finding his faith in Christianity. The Korea Herald reported that Park had "began thinking more deeply about luck and the existence of God" after facing business challenges in the late 2000s, including JYP Entertainment's troubled entry into the US market due to the 2008 global financial crisis. He later went on a two-month trip to the Middle East in 2012 to study major world religions, which included a bible study in Jerusalem. He nonetheless still described himself as nonreligious in 2014. That same year, Park came under scrutiny after his wife was revealed to be a niece of Yoo Byung-eun, the then reported leader of the Evangelical Baptist Church of Korea, known in South Korea as the Salvation Sect. Yoo had been investigated due to his alleged links to Chonghaejin Marine, the operator of the ferry involved in the sinking of MV Sewol, which killed 304 people. Subsequent reports alleged that an investigation was underway into several hundred million won that had been transferred from a company controlled by Park's father-in-law to JYP Entertainment. The company denied the allegations and the existence of any investigation; a follow-up report stated that financial authorities had not confirmed the allegations or Park's involvement.

In 2022, videos of his Bible lectures began being uploaded to the FirstFruits YouTube channel. FirstFruits officially registered as a non-profit organization in October 2023. According to the organization, it began in 2014 as a bible study group hosted by Park in his living room. The organization has since expanded to six locations in South Korea and one in the United States; all services are held by Park at its main church in Songpa District, Seoul, and live-streamed to the other locations and online.

=== Plagiarism allegation ===
On February 10, 2011, songwriter Kim Sin-il filed a lawsuit against Park claiming that "Someday", sung by IU and composed by Park, plagiarized Kim's song "To My Man". Kim alleged that the beginnings of the two songs, including the jazz chords, are almost identical and sued Park for 110 million won. Park denied the allegations, and no settlement was reached after several court hearings. On February 10, 2012, the Seoul Central District Court ruled that "Someday" was plagiarized from Kim's song, and ordered Park to pay 21.67 million won in damages to Kim. Park appealed the ruling, but on January 24, 2013, the Seoul High Court ruled against Park and ordered him to pay 56.93 million won to Kim. In 2015, the Supreme Court overturned the previous rulings in light of new evidence demonstrating that the melody and chord progressions were very common, specifically citing Kirk Franklin's 2002 song "Hosanna".

== Philanthropy ==
In December 2022, Park donated 500 million won each to Samsung Seoul Hospital and World Vision, an international relief and development non-governmental organization. In December 2023, he donated 200 million won each to 5 hospitals in South Korea to support the treatment of underprivileged children. In September 2026, Park Jin-young and JYP Entertainment donated a combined ₩550 million (approximately 7.5 million Mexican pesos) through World Vision Korea and World Vision Mexico to support medical care for children from disadvantaged communities in Mexico, of which ₩100 million was contributed personally by Park.

== Discography ==
=== Studio albums ===
Title	Album details	Peak chart positions	Sales
Title	Album details	KOR	Sales
Blue City	Released: September 1, 1994; Label: Orange Popular, Cheil Communications; Formats: CD, cassette	No data	No data
Tantara (딴따라)	Released: September 1, 1995; Label: Orange Popular, Cheil Communications; Formats: CD, cassette	No data	No data
Summer Jingle Bell	Released: May 2, 1997; Label: Orange Popular, Samsung Music; Formats: CD, cassette	No data	No data
Even After 10 Years (십년이 지나도)	Released: January 2, 1998; Label: Orange Popular, Samsung Music; Formats: CD, cassette	No data	No data
Kiss Me	Released: December 23, 1998; Label: Orange Popular, Samsung Music; Formats: CD, cassette	3	KOR: 266,327+
Game	Released: June 7, 2001; Label: JYP Entertainment, Daeyoung AV; Formats: CD, cassette	2	KOR: 383,200+
Back To Stage	Released: November 16, 2007; Label: JYP Entertainment, Seoul Records; Formats: CD	6	KOR: 34,571+
Data not available prior to 1999.

=== Compilation albums ===
Title	Album details	Peak chart positions	Sales
Title	Album details	JPN	Sales
J.Y. Park Best	Released: October 7, 2020; Label: Epic Records Japan; Formats: CD, digital download	11	JPN: 10,186

=== Extended plays ===
Title	Album details	Peak chart positions	Sales
Title	Album details	KOR	Sales
Spring: 5 Songs for a New Love (Spring 새로운 사랑에게 보내는 다섯곡의 노래)	Released: April 29, 2012; Label: JYP Entertainment, KMP Holdings; Formats: CD, digital download	13	KOR: 1,618+
Halftime	Released: September 9, 2013; Label: JYP Entertainment, KT Music; Formats: CD, digital download	15	KOR: 2,022+

=== Single albums ===
Title	Album details	Peak chart positions
Title	Album details	KOR
Sad Freedom	Released: December 1, 2009; Label: JYP Entertainment, LOEN Entertainment; Formats: CD, digital download	63

=== Singles ===
Title	Year	Peak chart positions			Sales (DL)	Certifications	Album
Title	Year	KOR	KOR Hot	US World	Sales (DL)	Certifications	Album
"Don't Leave Me"	1994	*	*	*	—N/a	—N/a	Blue City
"Behind You"	1994	*	*	*	—N/a	—N/a	Blue City
"Elevator"	1995	*	*	*	—N/a	—N/a	Dantara
"Proposal Song"	1995	*	*	*	—N/a	—N/a	Dantara
"She Was Pretty"	1997	*	*	*	—N/a	—N/a	Summer Jingle Bell
"Summer Jingle Bell"	1997	*	*	*	—N/a	—N/a	Summer Jingle Bell
"Honey"	1998	*	*	*	—N/a	—N/a	Even After 10 Years
"Even After 10 Years"	1998	*	*	*	—N/a	—N/a	Even After 10 Years
"Kiss Me"	1998	*	*	*	—N/a	—N/a	Kiss Me
"I Have a Girlfriend"	2001	*	*	*	—N/a	—N/a	Game
"Swing Baby"	2001	*	*	*	—N/a	—N/a	Game
"The House You Live In"	2007	*	*	*	—N/a	—N/a	Back to Stage
"Farewell in Broad Daylight"	2007	*	*	*	—N/a	—N/a	Back to Stage
"No Love No More"	2009	25	*	*	—N/a	—N/a	Sad Freedom
"Someone Else" (with Gain)	2012	2	4	—	KOR: 1,155,614		Spring: 5 Songs for a New Love
"You're the One"	2012	3	5	—	KOR: 1,500,929		Spring: 5 Songs for a New Love
"Movie Star"	2012	94	—	—	KOR: 49,605		Non-album singles
"Classic" (with Taecyeon, Wooyoung, Suzy)	2012	58	66	—	KOR: 60,635		Non-album singles
"Had Enough Parties"	2013	9	15	—	KOR: 223,735		Halftime
"Who's Your Mama?" (어머님이 누구니) (feat. Jessi)	2015	1	*	12	KOR: 1,160,311		J.Y. Park Best
"I'm So Sexy" (with Yoo Jae-suk)	2015	5	*	—	KOR: 962,555		Infinite Challenge: Yeongdong Expressway Music Festival
"All I Need" (feat. P-Type)	2015	—	*	—			Non-album single
"Still Alive" (살아있네)	2016	23	*	—	KOR: 143,047		J.Y. Park Best
"Regrets" (with Heize)	2017	19	58	—	KOR: 55,148		Blue & Red
"This Small Hand" (꽉 잡은 이 손)	2019	—	—	—	—N/a		J.Y. Park Best
"Fever" (feat. Superbee, Bibi)	2019	30	11	—	—N/a		J.Y. Park Best
"When We Disco" (with Sunmi)	2020	3	2	22	—N/a	KMCA: Platinum (st.)	J.Y. Park Best
"Switch to Me" (나로 바꾸자) (with Rain)	2020	15	8	—	—N/a		Pieces by Rain
"Groove Back" (feat. Gaeko)	2022	164	—	—	—N/a		Groove Missing
"Changed Man"	2023	— (Note: "Changed Man" did not chart on the Circle Digital Chart, but peaked at number 27 on the component download chart.)	—	—	—N/a		Non-album singles
"Like Magic" (with Stray Kids, Itzy and Nmixx)	2024	— (Note: "Like Magic" did not chart on the Circle Digital Chart, but peaked at number 63 on the component download chart.)	—	—	—N/a		Non-album singles
"Easy Lover"	2024	— (Note: "Easy Lover" did not enter the Circle Digital Chart, but peaked at number 61 on the Download Chart.)	—	—	—N/a		Non-album singles
"Happy Hour" (with Kwon Jin-ah)	2025	— (Note: "Happy Hour" did not enter the Circle Digital Chart, but peaked at number 48 on the Download Chart.)	—	—	—N/a		Non-album singles
"Wet"	2026	— (Note: "Wet" did not enter the Circle Digital Chart, but peaked at number 38 on the Download Chart.)	—	—	—N/a		Non-album singles
"—" denotes releases that did not chart or were not released in that region. "*" denotes that chart did not exist at the time.

==== As PD J. Y. Park ====
Title	Year	Peak chart positions	Album
Title	Year	KOR DL	Album
"Corny Love Song" (with Yoyomi)	2021	34	Non-album single

=== Soundtrack appearances ===
Title	Year	Peak chart positions	Sales (DL)	Album
Title	Year	KOR	Sales (DL)	Album
"Because I love you" (사랑하기 때문에)	2010	—	—N/a	MBC Music Tour Lalala Live Vol.9
"If" (못 잊은 거죠)	2011	3	—N/a	Dream High OST Part 5
"My Valentine" (with Taecyeon & Nichkhun)	2011	16		Dream High OST Part 5
"Falling"	2012	14	KOR: 542,471	Dream High 2 OST Part 1
"Gatsby"	2025	— (Note: "Gatsby" did not enter the Circle Digital Chart, but peaked at number 127 on the Download Chart.)		World of Street Woman Fighter OST Vol.4 (Final)
"—" denotes releases that did not chart or were not released in that region.

== Filmography ==
=== Film ===
Year	Title	Role	Notes
2012	The Wonder Girls Movie	Himself	Supporting Role
2012	A Millionaire on the Run	Choi Young-in	Lead Role
2013	Queen of the Night	Locksmith	Cameo

=== Television series ===
Year	Title	Role	Notes
2011	Dream High	Yang Jin-man	Supporting Role
2012	Dream High 2	Yang Jin-man	Supporting Role
2015	Dream Knight	The Moon	Cameo
2015	The Producers	Himself	Cameo; episodes 3–4

=== Variety and reality shows ===
Year	Title	Notes
2011–2017	K-pop Star	Judge; six seasons
2015	Sixteen	Judge
2017	Party People	Host
2017	Stray Kids	Judge
2019	Super Intern	CEO and Host; hiring for new staff in marketing department
2020	Nizi Project	Judge
2021	Loud	Judge for JYP Entertainment
2022	Sing for Gold	Judge / Host
2023	A2K (America2Korea)	Judge / Host
2023	Golden Girls	Producer
2025	World of Street Woman Fighter	Judge

== Awards ==
Name of the award ceremony, year presented, category, nominee(s) of the award, and the result of the nomination
Award ceremony	Year	Category	Nominee / work	Result	Ref.
Golden Disc Awards	2007	Producer Award	Park Jin-young	Won	
Golden Disc Awards	2016	Digital Bonsang	"Who's Your Mama?"	Won	
Mnet 20's Choice Awards	2012	20's Do Don't	Park Jin-young	Won	
Mnet Asian Music Awards	2001	Best R&B Performance	"I Have a Girlfriend"	Won	
Mnet Asian Music Awards	2009	Best Asian Composer	"Nobody"	Won	
Mnet Asian Music Awards	2015	Best Male Artist	Park Jin-young	Won	
Mnet Asian Music Awards	2015	Best Producer	Park Jin-young	Won	
Mnet Asian Music Awards	2024	Inspiring Achievement	Park Jin-young	Won	

=== State honors ===
Name of country, year given, and name of honor
Country	Year	Honor	Ref.
South Korea (Note: Honors are given at the Korean Popular Culture and Arts Awards, arranged by the Korea Creative Content Agency and hosted by the Ministry of Culture, Sports and Tourism. They are awarded to those who have contributed to the arts and South Korea's pop culture.)	2011	Presidential Commendation	

=== Listicles ===
Name of publisher, year listed, name of listicle, and placement
Publisher	Year	Listicle	Placement	Ref.
Forbes	2021	Korea Power Celebrity	28th	
Golden Disc Awards	2025	Golden Disc Powerhouse 40	Placed	
