= List of presidential trips made by Barack Obama (2014) =

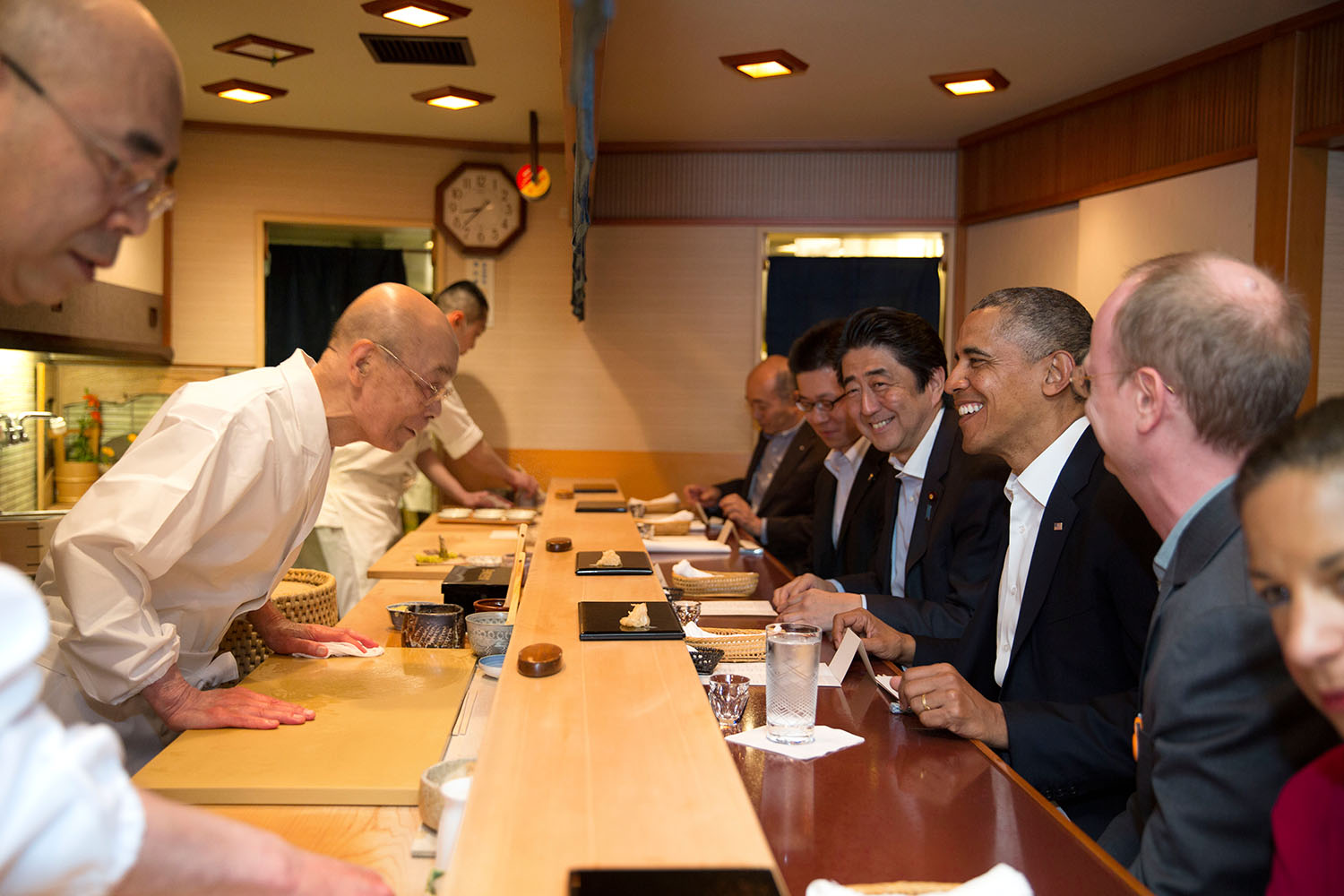
Obama dining with Japanese Prime Minister Shinzō Abe at Sukiyabashi Jiro during his visit to Tokyo, Japan, April 23, 2014

This is a list of presidential trips made by Barack Obama during 2014, the sixth year of his presidency as the 44th president of the United States.

This list excludes trips made within Washington, D.C., the US federal capital in which the White House, the official residence and principal workplace of the president, is located. Additionally excluded are trips to Camp David, the country residence of the president, and to the private home of the Obama family in Kenwood, Chicago.

== January ==
Country/ U.S. state	Areas visited	Dates	Details	Image
North Carolina	Raleigh	January 15	President Obama toured Vacon facilities and delivered remarks at the North Carolina State University, regarding manufacturing jobs.	
Pennsylvania	Pittsburgh	January 29	President Obama signed the myRA program and delivered remarks at U.S. Steel's Irvin plant.	
Wisconsin	Milwaukee	January 30	President Obama visited General Electric's Gas Engine Plant, where he delivered a speech regarding jobs and minimum wage.	
Tennessee	Nashville	January 30	President Obama delivered a speech on education at McGavock High School.	

== February ==
Country/ U.S. state	Areas visited	Dates	Details	Image
Michigan	Lansing, East Lansing	February 7	President Obama toured the Michigan Biotechnology Institute in Lansing and signed the Agricultural Act of 2014 at the Michigan State University in East Lansing.	
Virginia	Charlottesville	February 10	President Obama took French president François Hollande on a trip to Monticello, the residence of third President and Founding Father Thomas Jefferson, who had served as a United States Minister to France.	
Maryland	Cambridge	February 14	President Obama spoke about minimum wage increase and immigration at the House Democratic Issues Conference.	
California	Fresno, Palm Springs	February 14–17	In Fresno, President Obama met with community leaders during a round table discussion to discuss the 2012–2013 North American drought, before meeting with farmers affected by the drought, where he announced a $183 million aid for drought relief programs in California. In Palm Springs, President Obama met with King Abdullah II of Jordan at the Sunnylands estate to discuss the Israeli–Palestinian peace process and the Syrian Civil War.	
Mexico	Toluca	February 19	President Obama met with Canadian prime minister Stephen Harper and Mexican president Enrique Peña Nieto at the North American Leaders' Summit to discuss commerce, energy, immigration, and trade.	
Minnesota	Saint Paul	February 26	President Obama delivered remarks at the Saint Paul Union Depot regarding the investment of infrastructure improvement.	

== March ==
Country/ U.S. state	Areas visited	Dates	Details	Image
Connecticut	New Britain	March 5	President Obama delivered remarks at the Central Connecticut State University regarding the need to increase the federal minimum wage.	
Massachusetts	Boston	March 5	President Obama attended a round table discussion fundraiser for the Democratic National Committee, before attending a dinner with the committee at The Artists For Humanity EpiCenter.	
Florida	Miami	March 7	President Obama and First Lady Michelle Obama visited the Coral Reef Senior High School, where the president spoke about the FAFSA.	
New York	New York City	March 11	President Obama visited the Gap store in Midtown Manhattan to acknowledge the company's increase in minimum wage. The president also attended two fundraising events for the Democratic National Committee.	
Maryland	Bethesda	March 17	President Obama met with injured troops and their families at the Walter Reed National Military Medical Center.	
Florida	Orlando, Miami	March 20	In Orlando, President Obama met with female students during a round table discussion at Valencia College, before delivering a speech about the need for equal payment and educational opportunities for women. In Miami, President Obama attended two fundraising events for the Democratic Party.	
Netherlands	Amsterdam, The Hague	March 24–26	In Amsterdam, President Obama toured the Rijksmuseum, where a bilateral meeting with Prime Minister Mark Rutte was held, before attending the Nuclear Security Summit at the World Forum in The Hague on March 24 and 25. The president also met with G7 leaders at the Catshuis to discuss the Ukrainian crisis and met with King Willem-Alexander at the Royal Palace of Amsterdam.	
Belgium	Waregem, Brussels	March 26–27	In Brussels, President Obama attended a wreath-laying ceremony and toured the Flanders Field American Cemetery and Memorial, before attending the EU-US Summit with European Commission President José Manuel Barroso and European Council President Herman Van Rompuy and meeting with NATO Secretary General Anders Fogh Rasmussen. President Obama also delivered a speech at the Centre for Fine Arts, mainly regarding the annexation of Crimea by the Russian Federation.	
Vatican City	Vatican City	March 27–28	President Obama met with Pope Francis at Vatican City to discuss economic inequality,	
Italy	Rome	March 27–28	President Obama met with President Giorgio Napolitano and Prime Minister Matteo Renzi. The president also toured the Colosseum.	
Saudi Arabia	Riyadh	March 28–29	President Obama met with King Abdullah to discuss regional security and political issues, including the nuclear program of Iran and the Syrian Civil War.	

== April ==
Country/ U.S. state	Areas visited	Dates	Details	Image
Michigan	Ann Arbor	April 2	President Obama delivered remarks at the University of Michigan, urging for an increase in minimum wage. The president also visited a local delicatessen.	
Illinois	Chicago	April 2	President Obama attended two fundraising events for the Democratic National Committee.	
Texas	Killeen, Houston, Austin	April 8–9	In Killeen, President Obama and First Lady Michelle Obama attended a memorial service to commemorate the victims of the 2014 Fort Hood shootings. In Houston, the president and the first lady were greeted by former president George H. W. Bush upon arrival at George Bush Intercontinental Airport, before heading to a Democratic National Committee event and dinner. The following day, in Austin, the president and the first lady attended the commemoration of the 50th anniversary of the signing of the Civil Rights Act of 1964 at the Lyndon Baines Johnson Library and Museum.	
New York	New York City	April 11	President Obama delivered remarks at the National Action Network's 16th Annual Convention.	
Pennsylvania	Pittsburgh	April 16	President Obama, along with Vice President Joe Biden, delivered remarks at the Community College of Allegheny County to promote the importance of job training in the economy.	
Washington	Oso	April 22	President Obama toured Oso's damage from the mudslide that took place the previous month. The president also delivered remarks at the Oso Fire Department and met with the victims' families.	
Japan	Tokyo	April 23–25	President Obama met with Prime Minister Shinzō Abe during a private dinner at Sukiyabashi Jiro. The following morning, on April 24, the president met with Emperor Akihito and Empress Michiko at the Tokyo Imperial Palace, before meeting with Prime Minister Abe at the Akasaka Palace in a joint press conference to discuss the territorial disputes in the South China Sea, particularly the disputes over the Senkaku Islands, in which President Obama emphasized on his commitments to the Treaty of Mutual Cooperation and Security between the United States and Japan. President Obama also met with students and viewed an ASIMO robot exhibit at the Miraikan and visited the Meiji Shrine, before attending a state dinner at the Imperial Palace, hosted by Emperor Akihito and Empress Michiko.	
South Korea	Seoul	April 25–26	President Obama attended a wreath-laying ceremony at the War Memorial of Korea and visited Gyeongbokgung, before meeting with President Park Geun-hye at the Blue House to discuss North Korea's nuclear threat and the U.S.-Korea Free Trade Agreement. In the wake of the sinking of the MV Sewol, President Obama also presented President Park with the American flag that flew over the White House during the day of the disaster (April 16), as well as presenting a magnolia seed to the Danwon High School, which victimized a number of the high school's students and teachers. The following day, the president met with American and Korean business leaders to discuss the trade and economic cooperation between the two countries and delivered remarks at Yongsan Garrison.	
Malaysia	Kuala Lumpur	April 26–28	President Obama was greeted with a welcoming ceremony outside the Malaysian Houses of Parliament, where he was accompanied by Yang di-Pertuan Agong Abdul Halim and Prime Minister Najib Razak. In the evening, the president was also hosted a state dinner by Yang di-Pertuan Agong Abdul Halim and Raja Permaisuri Agong Sultanah Haminah Hamidun at the Istana Negara. On April 27, President Obama visited the National Mosque of Malaysia, before holding a bilateral meeting and a joint press conference with Prime Minister Najib at the Perdana Putra to discuss issues on trade, defense, and maritime security, as well as the United States' commitment to contributing to the search for Malaysia Airlines Flight 370. He also delivered remarks at the Malaysian Global Innovation and Creativity Centre and participated in the Young Southeast Asian Leaders Initiative Town Hall meeting at the University of Malaya.	
Philippines	Manila, Pasay, Taguig	April 28–29	President Obama met with President Benigno Aquino III at the Malacañang Palace to discuss efforts in resolving the territorial and maritime disputes in the South China Sea and the enhancement of the two countries' security and strategic cooperation with the signing of the Enhanced Defense Cooperation Agreement, which was followed by a joint press conference. In the evening, President Obama was hosted a state dinner by President Aquino, where he was also awarded the Order of Sikatuna. Obama delivered remarks at Fort Bonifacio, where he met with American and Filipino troops, and attended a wreath-laying ceremony and toured the Manila American Cemetery and Memorial.	

== May ==
Country/ U.S. state	Areas visited	Dates	Details	Image
Arkansas	Vilonia	May 7	President Obama met with families and victims of the tornado outbreak of April 27–30, 2014.	
California	Los Angeles, San Diego, San Jose	May 7–9	In Los Angeles, President Obama attended a joint event for the Democratic Congressional Campaign Committee and Democratic Senatorial Campaign Committee, before attending a fundraising gala for the USC Shoah Foundation Institute for Visual History and Education, where he was awarded an Ambassador for Humanity Award by founder Steven Spielberg. The president then flew to San Diego to attend a fundraising event at the residence of Qualcomm co-founder Irwin M. Jacobs in La Jolla, before departing for San Jose, where he attended two fundraising events for the Democratic National Committee.	
New York	Tarrytown, New York City	May 14–15	President Obama delivered remarks on rebuilding infrastructure and transportation funding in Tarrytown, near the Tappan Zee Bridge, before attending fundraising events for the Democratic National Committee and the Democratic Senatorial Campaign Committee. The president and the first lady also attended the dedication of the National September 11 Memorial & Museum.	
New York	Cooperstown	May 22	President Obama toured the National Baseball Hall of Fame and Museum.	
Illinois	Chicago	May 22–23	President Obama attended two fundraising events for the Democratic Senatorial Campaign Committee and Senator Dick Durbin at the residence of Invenergy CEO Michael Polsky and at the residence of Newsweb Corporation founder Fred Eychaner.	
Afghanistan	Bagram	May 25–26	President Obama paid a surprise visit to Bagram Airfield to meet with the American troops and civilians stationed in the military base.	
Virginia	Arlington	May 26	President Obama participated in Memorial Day ceremonies at Arlington National Cemetery.	
New York	West Point	May 28	President Obama delivered remarks at the commencement ceremony at the United States Military Academy.	

== June ==
Country/ U.S. state	Areas visited	Dates	Details	Image
Poland	Warsaw	June 3–4	President Obama met with President Bronisław Komorowski, upon arrival at Warsaw Chopin Airport, where they also met with American and Polish airmen, before holding a bilateral meeting and a joint press conference at Belweder to discuss the United States' commitment to the security of Central and Eastern European allies. The president also met with Prime Minister Donald Tusk and Ukrainian President-elect Petro Poroshenko, the latter of who was to discuss the United States' commitment to the stabilization of Ukraine's economy and democracy, in relation to the 2014 pro-Russian unrest in Ukraine, which was further discussed with other NATO leaders. President Obama delivered remarks at Castle Square during the 25th anniversary celebration of Poland's return to democracy.	
Belgium	Brussels	June 4–5	President Obama attended the G7 summit. He also met with King Philippe and Prime Minister Elio Di Rupo, as well as a bilateral meeting with British prime minister David Cameron.	
France	Paris, Omaha Beach, Benouville, Ouistreham	June 5–6	President Obama met with President François Hollande in Paris, before attending the 70th anniversary celebrations of the Normandy landings at the Normandy American Cemetery and Memorial in Colleville-sur-Mer and at Sword Beach in Ouistreham.	
Massachusetts	Worcester, Weston	June 11	President Obama delivered remarks at a commencement ceremony at Worcester Technical High School to praise the high school's contributions to the United States' competitiveness to the world economy. The president also attended a Democratic Senatorial Campaign Committee event in Weston.	
North Dakota	Bismarck, Cannon Ball	June 13	President Obama and First Lady Michelle Obama visited the Standing Rock Indian Reservation to meet with the Native American youth, where the president announced plans to improving the living conditions and opportunities for Native Americans.	
Pennsylvania	Pittsburgh	June 17	President Obama visited the TechShop workshop in Pittsburgh, where he also delivered remarks and answered questions regarding manufacturing and innovation.	
New York	New York City	June 17	President Obama attended three Democratic Party fundraising events, including an event for the Senate Majority political action committee and an LGBT gala hosted by the Democratic National Committee at the Gotham Hall.	
Minnesota	Minneapolis	June 26–27	President Obama spoke at a town hall meeting at Minnehaha Park and met with Rebekah Erler, a mother who wrote a letter to President Obama to discuss financial struggles. The president also attended a Democratic Congressional Campaign Committee event and delivered remarks on the economy at the Lake Harriet Bandshell.	

== July ==
Country/ U.S. state	Areas visited	Dates	Details	Image
Colorado	Denver	July 8–9	President Obama met with five Coloradan residents at a dinner in LoDo to discuss economical issues, including minimum wage and student loans. The president also discussed the economy at a speech delivered at Cheesman Park, before attending a fundraising event for Senator Mark Udall re-election campaign.	
Texas	Dallas, Austin	July 9–10	President Obama met with Governor Rick Perry in Dallas to discuss the 2014 American immigration crisis, before attending Democratic Party fundraising events in Dallas and Austin.	
Delaware	Wilmington	July 17	President Obama delivered remarks at the Port of Wilmington to announce an infrastructural program.	
New York	New York City	July 17	President Obama attended two Democratic Party fundraising events separately for the Democratic National Committee and for the Democratic House Majority political action committee.	
Washington	Seattle	July 22	President Obama attended two Democratic Party fundraising events.	
California	San Francisco, Los Angeles	July 22–24	In San Francisco, President Obama spoke at a House Majority political action committee event at the Four Seasons Hotel, before attending a fundraising event for the Democratic Congressional Campaign Committee at the residence of Marcus & Millichap co-founder, George M. Marcus, in Los Altos Hills. The president then flew to Los Angeles to attend a fundraising event at the residence of television producer Shonda Rhimes in Hancock Park. He also delivered remarks on the economy at the Los Angeles Trade–Technical College.	
Maryland	Bethesda	July 29	President Obama visited the Walter Reed National Military Medical Center to meet with injured military troops.	
Missouri	Kansas City	July 29–30	President Obama dined at Arthur Bryant's to meet with four people who wrote him letters on everyday life struggles and spoke at the Uptown Theater, regarding the economy.	

== August ==
Country/ U.S. state	Areas visited	Dates	Details	Image
North Carolina	Charlotte	August 26	President Obama delivered remarks at the American Legion's 96th National Convention.	
New York	New Rochelle, Purchase	August 29	President Obama attended a round table discussion in New Rochelle and a Democratic National Committee fundraising event in Purchase.	
Rhode Island	Newport	August 29	President Obama attended a Democratic Congressional Campaign Committee fundraising event.	

== September ==
Country/ U.S. state	Areas visited	Dates	Details	Image
Wisconsin	Milwaukee	September 1	President Obama delivered remarks at the annual Laborfest celebrations, held at the Henry Maier Festival Park.	
Estonia	Tallinn	September 3–4	President Obama met with President Toomas Hendrik Ilves and Prime Minister Taavi Rõivas, as well as Latvian president Andris Bērziņš and Lithuanian president Dalia Grybauskaitė to discuss the Russian military intervention in Ukraine threatening Eastern Europe and other NATO allies. The president also met with American and Estonian troops and delivered a speech at the Nordea Concert Hall.	
United Kingdom	Newport, Wiltshire	September 4–5	President Obama attended the NATO summit in Newport, Wales. Additionally, the president visited the Mount Pleasant Primary School with Prime Minister David Cameron and Stonehenge in Wiltshire, England.	
Virginia	Arlington County	September 11	President Obama attended a memorial ceremony at the Pentagon Memorial in Arlington County, Virginia, where he spoke on the thirteenth anniversary of the September 11 attacks.	
Maryland	Baltimore	September 12	President Obama toured Fort McHenry to commemorate the bicentenary of the War of 1812, which inspired the writing of the American national anthem, "The Star-Spangled Banner," before attending a Democratic Senatorial Campaign Committee fundraising event.	
Georgia	Atlanta	September 16	President Obama delivered remarks at the Centers for Disease Control and Prevention and at Emory University regarding the Ebola virus epidemic in West Africa.	
Florida	Tampa	September 16–17	President Obama met with military personnel and the United States Central Command at MacDill Air Force Base, where he also delivered remarks on the military intervention against the Islamic State of Iraq and the Levant.	
New York	New York City	September 23–25	President Obama and First Lady Michelle Obama visited the headquarters of the United Nations, where the president spoke at the Climate Summit and at the sixty-ninth session of the United Nations General Assembly. The president also delivered remarks at the Clinton Global Initiative, attended a Democratic Senatorial Campaign Committee fundraising event, presided the United Nations Security Council meeting to discuss a resolution against terrorism, spoke at an Open Government Partnership event, and met with Iraqi prime minister Haider al-Abadi, Egyptian president Abdel Fattah el-Sisi, and Ethiopian prime minister Hailemariam Desalegn.	

== October ==
Country/ U.S. state	Areas visited	Dates	Details	Image
Indiana; Illinois	Gary, Chicago	October 1–2	President Obama arrived at Gary/Chicago International Airport in Gary, Indiana, where he proceeded to Chicago to attend a fundraising event for Governor Pat Quinn, before delivering a speech on the economy at Northwestern University.	
Indiana	Princeton	October 3	President Obama visited the Millennium Steel Service plant to deliver remarks on manufacturing and its effect on the economy.	
New York	New York City	October 7	President Obama attended two Democratic National Committee events.	
Connecticut	Greenwich	October 7	President Obama attended a fundraising event for the Democratic Senatorial Campaign Committee.	
California	Los Angeles County, San Francisco	October 9–11	President Obama attended a town hall meeting on the economy at Cross Campus in Santa Monica and a fundraising event for the Democratic National Committee at the residence of actress Gwyneth Paltrow in Brentwood. The president also spoke at the Frank G. Bonelli Regional Park in San Dimas to declare part of the San Gabriel Mountains a National Monument. In San Francisco, President Obama attended a round table discussion and a fundraising event for the Democratic National Committee at the residence of Zynga co-founder Mark Pincus.	
Illinois	Chicago	October 19–20	President Obama attended a campaign rally for Governor Pat Quinn at the Chicago State University, as well as a Democratic National Committee fundraising event. The president also cast an early vote for the 2014 midterm elections.	
Wisconsin	Milwaukee	October 28	President Obama delivered a speech at the campaign rally for Governor candidate Mary Burke at the North Division High School.	
Maine	Portland, Cape Elizabeth	October 30	President Obama attended a fundraising event in Cape Elizabeth with Representative Mike Michaud, before attending a rally for Michaud's gubernatorial campaign at the Portland Exposition Building.	
Rhode Island	Providence	October 30–31	President Obama attended a round table discussion with faculty and students at Rhode Island College, before delivering a speech regarding the economy and women.	

== November ==
Country/ U.S. state	Areas visited	Dates	Details	Image
Michigan	Detroit	November 1	President Obama delivered a speech at the Wayne State University to campaign for Senator candidate Gary Peters and Governor candidate Mark Schauer.	
China	Beijing	November 10–12	President Obama attended the APEC summit. On November 11–12, the president held bilateral meetings with President Xi Jinping to discuss China–United States relations and international and regional issues, as well as military relations, the One-China policy, climate change, and terrorism. The president also met with Premier Li Keqiang, Australian prime minister Tony Abbott, and Indonesian president Joko Widodo.	
Myanmar (Burma)	Naypyidaw, Yangon	November 12–14	In Naypyidaw, President Obama attended the East Asia Summit and the U.S.-ASEAN summit meeting. He met with President Thein Sein to discuss Burma's democratic reforms and also held a bilateral meeting with Vietnamese prime minister Nguyễn Tấn Dũng. The president attended a round table discussion with members of the Assembly of the Union, Speaker Shwe Mann of the House of Representatives, Speaker Khin Aung Myint of the House of Nationalities, and Opposition Leader Aung San Suu Kyi to further discuss Burma's democratic reforms. In Yangon, President Obama held a bilateral meeting with Suu Kyi at her residence, which was followed by a joint press conference, before participating in the Young Southeast Asian Leaders Initiative Town Hall meeting at the University of Yangon. Additionally, the president had toured the Ministers' Building and attended a round table discussion with civil society organizations at the United States Embassy in Yangon.	
Australia	Brisbane	November 15–16	President Obama attended the G20 summit held at the Brisbane Convention & Exhibition Centre. The president also held a trilateral meeting with Prime Minister Tony Abbott and Japanese prime minister Shinzō Abe to discuss Russia's annexation of Crimea and delivered a speech at the University of Queensland regarding youth voice.	
Nevada	Las Vegas	November 21	President Obama delivered a speech at the Del Sol High School to discuss his executive plans for an immigration reform.	
Illinois	Chicago	November 25	President Obama spoke at the Mitchell P. Kobelinski Theater to promote his executive plans for an immigration reform.	

== December ==
Country/ U.S. state	Areas visited	Dates	Details	Image
Maryland	Bethesda	December 2	President Obama met with injured troops at the Walter Reed National Military Medical Center, before touring the National Institutes of Health, where he spoke on the efforts to fighting the Ebola virus epidemic in West Africa.	
Tennessee	Nashville	December 9	President Obama delivered remarks at Casa Azafrán to discuss his executive plans for an immigration reform.	
New Jersey	Joint Base McGuire–Dix–Lakehurst	December 15	President Obama spoke to American troops returning from Afghanistan at Joint Base McGuire–Dix–Lakehurst.	

== See also ==
- List of international presidential trips made by Barack Obama
- Lists of presidential trips made by Barack Obama
