= MV Ohamana =

Japanese-built South Korean ferry

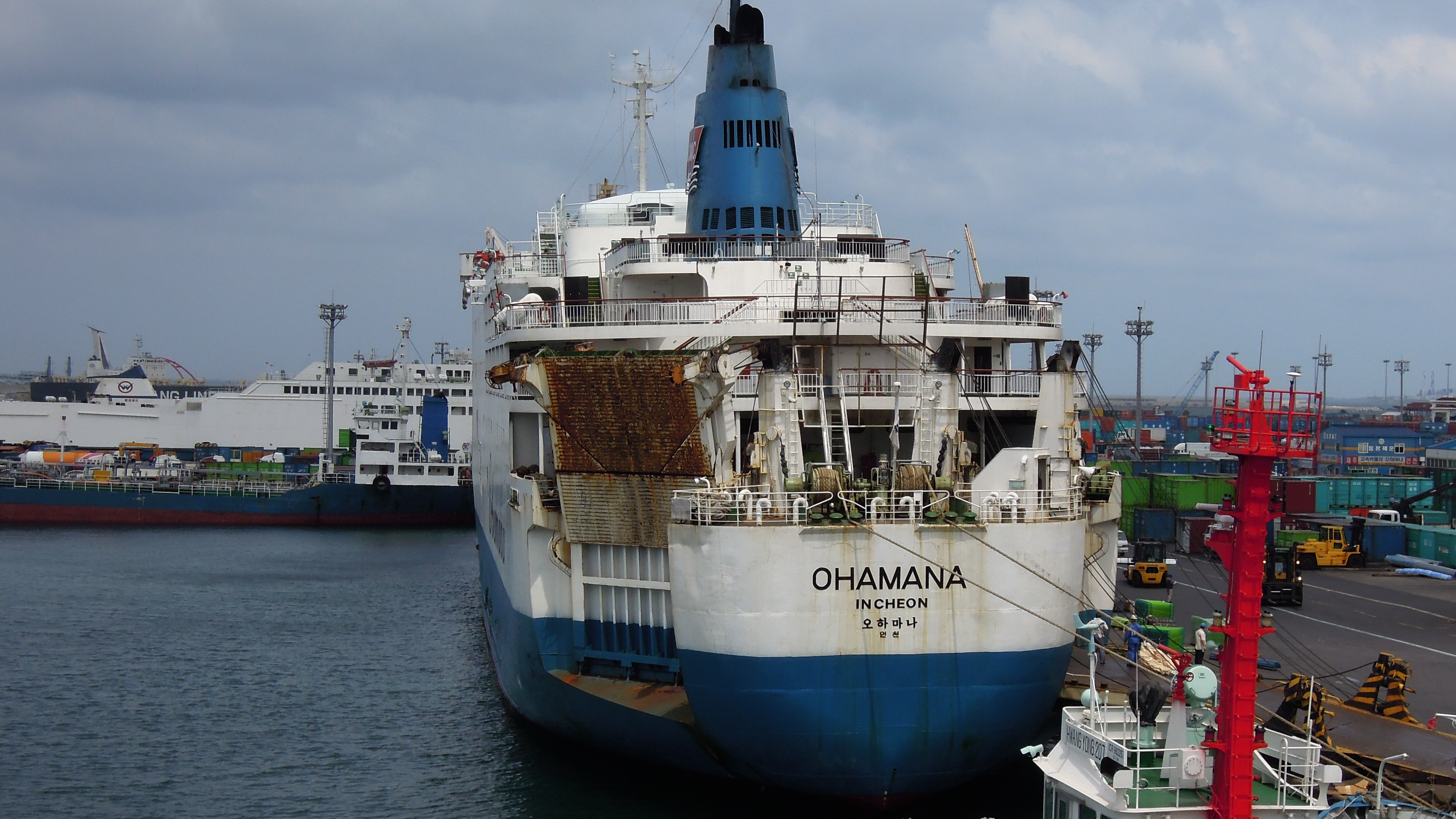
- Ohamana stern in 2011.

History
- Name: Ferry Akebono (1989–2003); Ohamana (2003–2018)
- Owner: Oshima Unyu, Kagoshima, Japan (1989–2003); Chonghaejin Marine, Incheon, South Korea (2003–2014); Seodong Maritime, Panama, (2015); Panama (2016–2018)
- Port of registry: Naze, Japan (1989–2003); Incheon, South Korea (2003–2015); Panama (2016–2018)
- Builder: "Mitsubishi Heavy Industries", Shimonoseki, Japan
- Yard number: 928
- Laid down: April, 1989
- Launched: 2 October 1989
- Completed: September 1989
- In service: (Japan) Oshima Unyu - September 1989; (South Korea) Chonghaejin Marine Company - January 2003
- Out of service: 2014
- Identification: IMO number: 8905373
- Fate: Scrapped in Bangladesh, 2018.
- Notes: Fleetmate to ferry MV Sewol

General characteristics
- Type: RoPax ferry
- Tonnage: 6,322 GT; 3,435 DWT
- Length: 141.50 m (464 ft 3 in)
- Beam: 22.00 m (72 ft 2 in)
- Depth: 13.00 m (42 ft 8 in)
- Installed power: 2 × diesel engines; 18,000 horsepower (13,000 kW)
- Propulsion: Two shafts; fixed pitch propellers; Bow and stern thrusters
- Speed: 21.0 knots (38.9 km/h; 24.2 mph)
- Capacity: As Ferry Akebono: 695 passengers, 109 containers, 63 cars, 42 8-ton trucks; As Ohamana: 937 passengers, 180 containers, 50 cars, and 50 5-ton trucks

MV Ohamana (Korean: 오하마나; Hanja: 奧濱名) is a South-Korean flagged ferry, originally built in Japan and sailed as Akebono (Japanese: フェリーあけぼの) for Oshima Unyu. She operated in Japan from 1989 to 2003 before being sold to Chonghaejin Marine Company and underwent refits, then operating on the Incheon - Jeju as Ohamana, would serve Chonghaejin Marine til 2014, when she was put off service and out for sale after the sinking of her fleetmate, MV Sewol. She was later scrapped beginning on 18 April 2018, at Chittagong port, Bangladesh.

== History ==
Ohamana was a RoPAX ferry built at Mitsubishi Heavy Industries' Shimonoseki Shipyard in Japan in September 1989 under the name Ferry Akebono (フェリーあけぼの). The vessel was operated by Oshima Unyu between Kagoshima City, Naha City and Okinawa until February 2003. In March 2003, a month after its retirement, it was brought in by Chonghaejin Marine Co., Ltd., to operate between Incheon and Jeju. Meanwhile, Oshima Unyu Line changed its name to A"Line (Maruei Ferry), bringing in a new ship to their fleet also named Ferry Akebono (フェリーあけぼの), in June 2008.

Ohamana operated with Chonghaejin Marine for over 11 years, until the sinking of her fleetmate Sewol. Ohamana was retired from service in Chonghaejin and was made available for sale for a while, but was never bought and eventually dismantled at the Port of Chittagong, Bangladesh on 18 April 2018.
