= GIVU effect =

Youth-focused non-governmental organisation in South Korea

- 기부이펙트
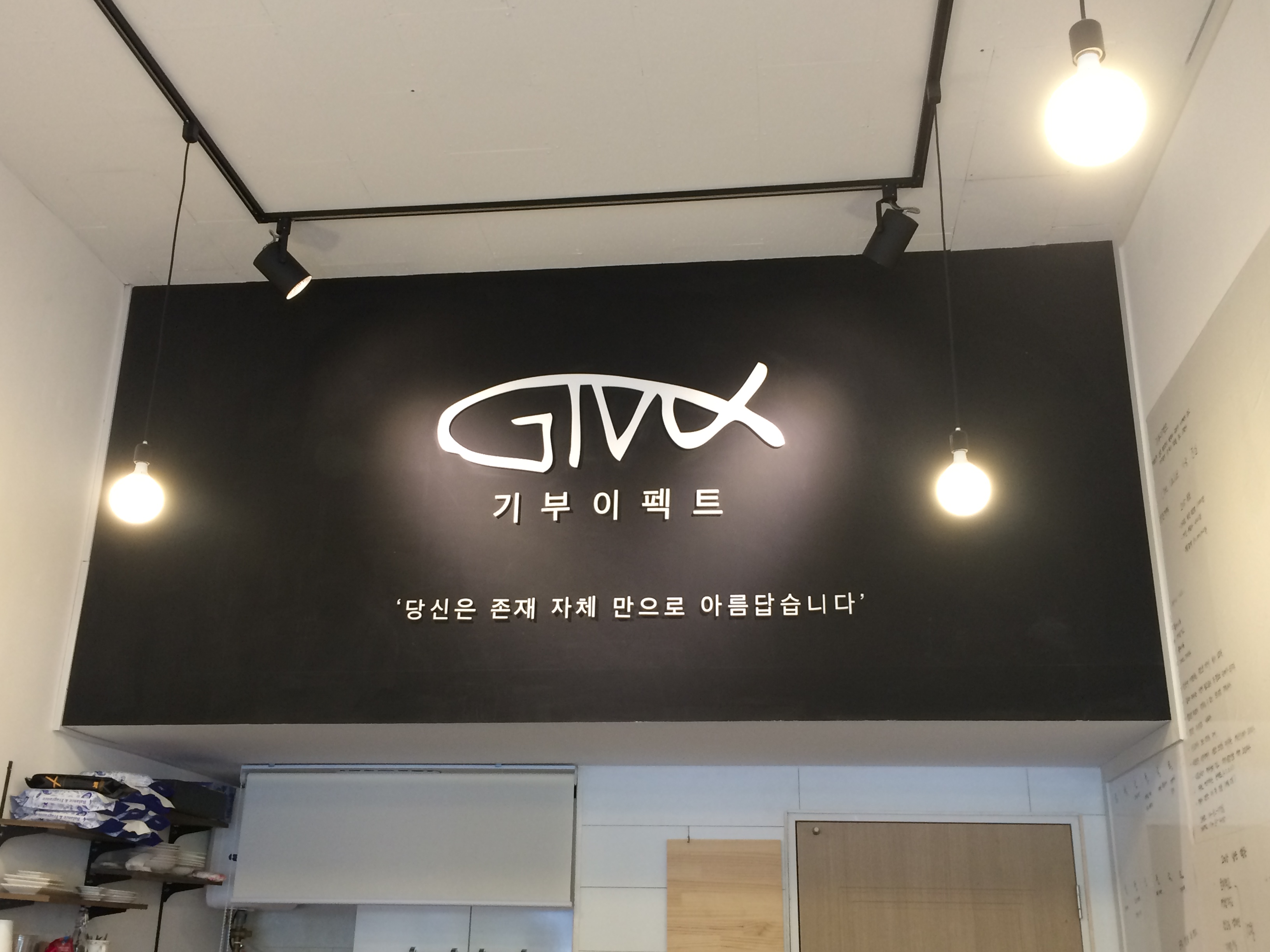
- Logo
- Location: 1555-1, Sa-dong, Sangnok-gu, Ansan, Gyeonggi, South Korea
- Website: www.givueffect.com

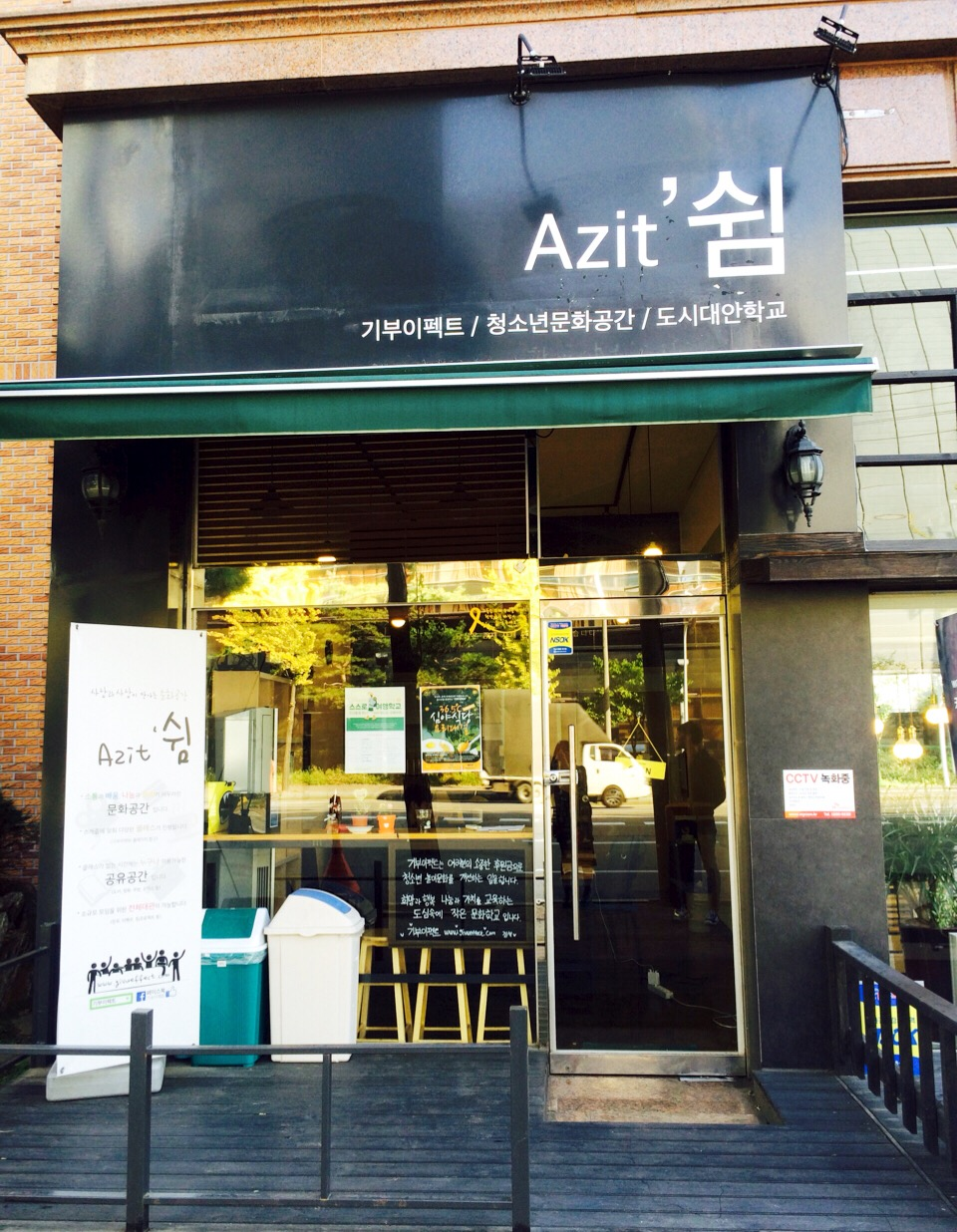
GIVU effect's office

GIVU effect (Korean: 기부이펙트) is a youth-focused non-governmental organisation (NGO) aiming to foster a "giving and sharing" culture through diverse contents of education and culture. GIVU effect's slogan is "Your presence alone is beautiful".

== Name Origin ==
GIVU is an acronym - Great I Valuable U effect. It means that every human is a great and valuable being. Also, it tells us that we have to be treated with dignity so we can all prosper as individuals. CEO Kim Hee-beom said, "Donation Effect is a name that expresses the hope that the donation culture will spread like the butterfly effect."

== History ==
The organization offers many camps or trips, such as walking competitions, fishing trips, and camping for single-parent families.

In 2013, the GIVU effect organized its first project, a group hike.

In 2014, the GIVU effect was officially registered as an NGO with the Korean government.

In 2015, GIVU effect opened the Youth Culture Schools at Azit'shelter in Ansan, Gyeonggi-do.

== List of Activities ==
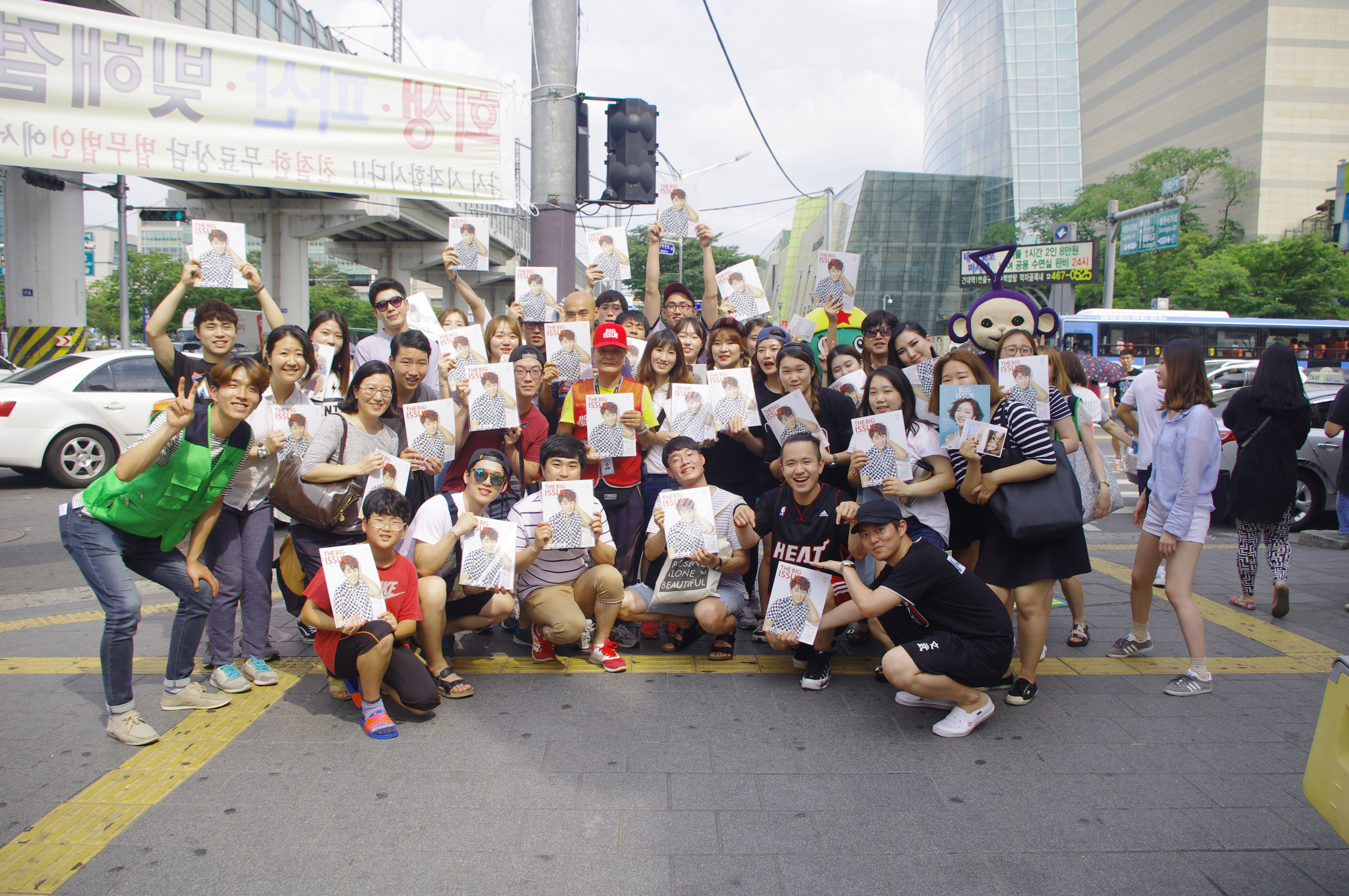
Sharing Flash mob

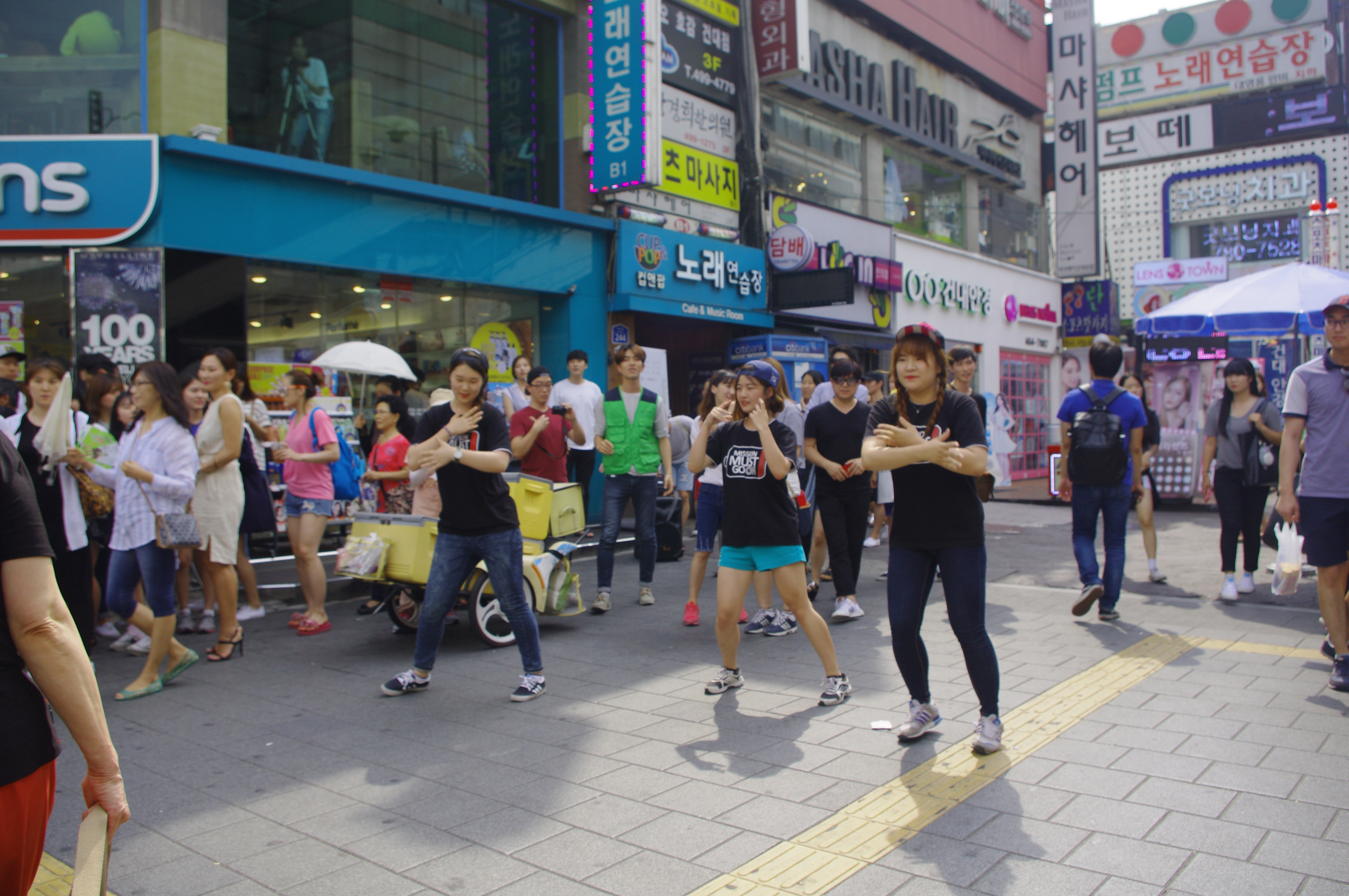
Sharing Flash mob 2

=== 2013 ===
- In May GIVU effect's first project, a group hike
- July: a Namsan walking competition
- August: Fishing service trip at gookhwado camp
- September: Camping for single-parent families
- September–December: "Sandal-do Heaven Village Project," including painting of village walls

=== 2014 ===
- April: NGO Registration
- May: GIVU effect held its first "share flash mob"
- May–June: test operation of culture program for teenager at Sinchang middle school in Suyoo
- August: Second "share flash mob"
- September: Third share flash mob
- October: Community work, donation of talent, "Picture'
- October: Community work, donation of talent, "Speech'
- October: Community work, donation of talent, "Soycandle'
- October: Fourth share flash mob
- November: Cheer for university admission "Make you relieve tension'
- November: Party for test-takers, titled "You take off your school uniform and put on yourself"
- November: Making "Kimchi" with the families of "Sewol" victems
- November: Community work, donation of talent, a one-day class on "Art psychotherapy'
- December: Share flea market at Myeongdong
- December: 1st Giver's Day

=== 2015 ===
- February: Opened Youth culture schools Azit'shelter in Ansan, Gyeonggi-do, Korea
- April: Held the first Ansan-si Sewol ferry memorial ceremony titled "memory, let's hope a song"
- May: Late-night restaurant cooking school season 1
- May: 1st Oneself traveling school, "Neulpum'
- May: Training project for youth activist of social enterprise, "Cheongsimhwan project"
- May: contract MOU with corporation "Openhands'
- July: Calligraphy one-day class
- July: School hiking along the ridges of Mt. Seorak
- July: Movie school
- July: 5th share flash mob (The Big Issue, Konkuk University Station)
- August: Youth camping
- September: Late-night restaurant cooking school, season 2
- September: 2nd Oneself traveling school
- October: Be happy on the way to school campaign, at Sunbu middle school

== Ongoing Projects ==
=== Education ===
The education of GIVU effect consists of Late-night Restaurant Cooking school, Oneself Travel school, school hiking along the ridges of Mt. Seorak, and Calligraphy school.

=== Community projects ===
"Community" of GIVU effect consists of Giver's day, Sharing Flash Mob, One-day class, "Let giver friend introduce," and remote area Santa. Giver's day is the regular meeting of people who want to practice sharing with members of GIVU effect. Once a quarter in April, July, October, and December, members of GIVU effect announce the activities during a meeting. The purpose of this program is to distribute the culture of sharing and value through lecture, volunteerism, and field trips. Sharing Flash Mob is an event type program that works to inspire members of the public. One-day classes is a project that educates and promotes sharing through showcasing various talents of GIVU effect members.

== See also ==
- Non-governmental organization
