= Life Word Mission =

South Korean religious movement

Life Word Mission (Korean: 생명의말씀선교회) is a South Korean Christian-based new religious movement founded in 1982 by Lee Yo-han (이요한; also known as Lee Bok-chil (이복칠)). It also uses the name The Korean Baptist Church (대한예수교침례회) in parallel. It is a splinter group from Yoo Byung-eun's Evangelical Baptist Church.

In South Korea, Life Word Mission is one of several movements commonly known as Guwonpa (Korean: 구원파; Hanja: 救援派) meaning Salvation Sect, from the Korean term guwon (Korean: 구원) meaning "salvations".

== Controversies ==
- A local church has sparked controversy after it was revealed that young members were encouraged to pledge 100 million KRW in building funds through part-time jobs.
