= Ock Soo Park =

South Korean pastor

- 박옥수
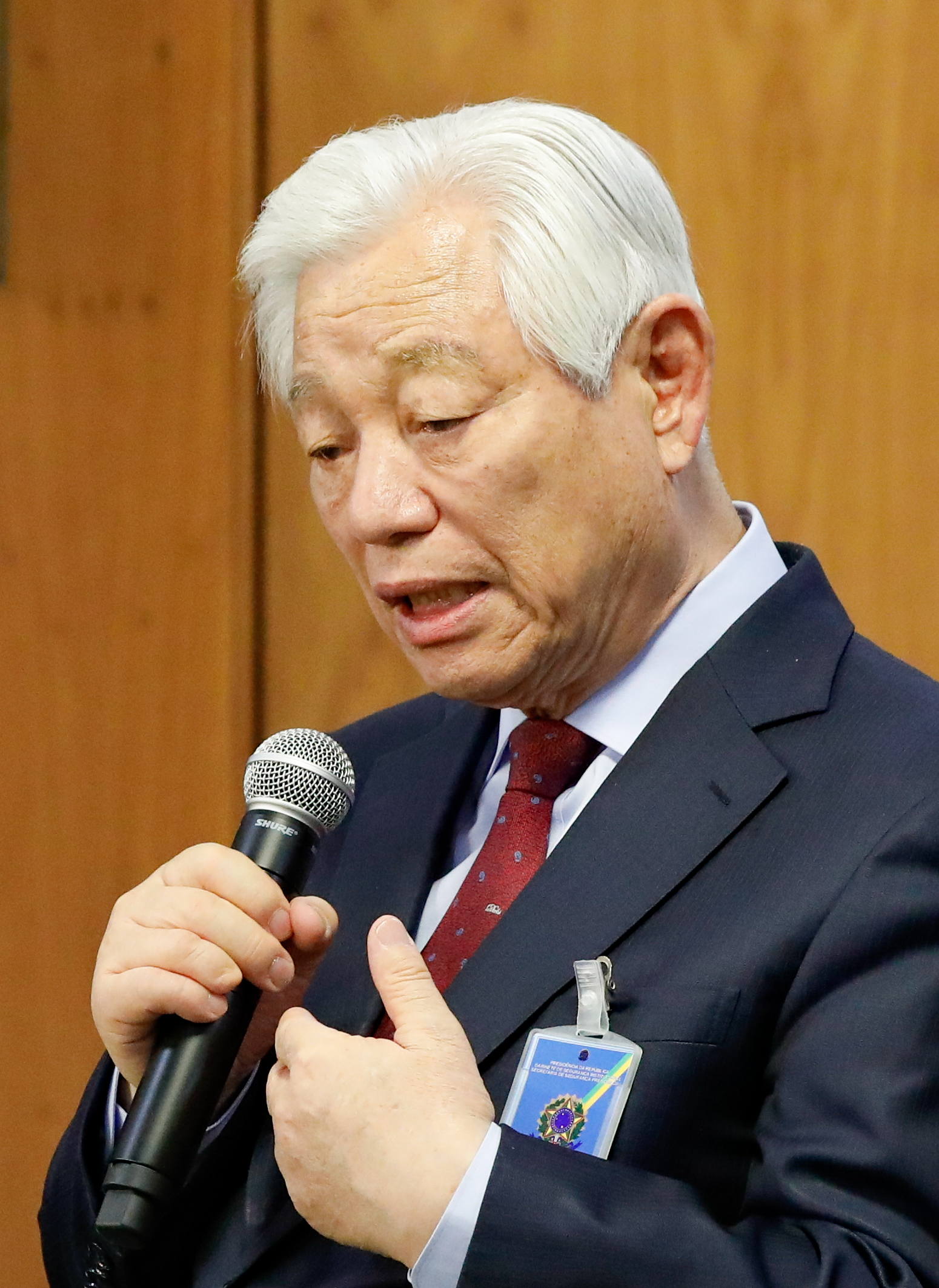
- Born: June 2, 1944 (age 82); Seonsan, Korea
- Occupation: Pastor
- Known for: Founder and Senior Pastor of Good News Mission
- Spouse: Myung Soon Kim (m. 1971)
- Children: Yeong Kook Park (son); Eun Sook Park (daughter)
- Website: http://www.ocksoopark.com

Ock Soo Park (born June 2, 1944) is a South Korean religious leader known for founding Good News Mission, a new religious movement often described as a Salvation Sect. He has also founded other organizations, including the Gracias Choir and Orchestra and the International Youth Fellowship (IYF).

== Early life and founding Good News Ministry ==
Ock Soo Park was born in 1944 in Seonsan, and attended a Presbyterian church in his youth. After studying under western missionaries in the 1960s, he founded the Good News Mission in 1972. Over the following years, Park grew the church globally. Around 1986, the church began to hold "grand bible seminars" and evangelize internationally. In 1995, he founded the International Youth Fellowship, a global youth leadership organization affiliated with Good News Mission.

=== Salvation Sect ===
Professors David W. Kim and Won-il Bang describe Good News Mission as a Christian new religious movement and Salvation Sect because the group believes in "one-time repentance of sins in the theological concept of justification" while sanctification is not required because all sins were forgiven during the crucifixion of Jesus. The Presbyterian Church of Korea argues Park's groups are heretical and classifies them as a Salvation Sect.

Good News Mission denies being a Salvation Sect.

== Ministry expansion ==
In 2000, Park founded the Gracias Choir, an orchestra and choral ensemble which travels with Park on his international tours.

The Seoul Central District Prosecutor's Office imposed a fine of 5 million KRW by summary order on December 31, 2012, against Park for violating the Food Sanitation Act. He was accused of unlawfully profiting by promoting the product "Ttobyeol," manufactured by Woonhwa Co., Ltd., as a 'drug' capable of curing cancer and AIDS.

In 2016 he was invited to preach a sermon at the "King's Prayer Meeting" in Swaziland (now Eswatini), which was broadcast by the national radio station.

On May 11, 2017, Park Ok-soo was fined 20 million KRW by the Seoul Central District Court for violating the National Land Planning and Utilization Act and the Building Act. The Seoul District Court ruled that Park illegally expanded a structure by installing one or two containers in March 2012 without obtaining the necessary permits from the relevant authorities. Additionally, he was found guilty of violating the Building Act by converting the fourth floor of a church building for office use in January 2015. Consequently, a fine of 20 million KRW was imposed. In July 2017, a separate fraud/scam case against Park and the Good News Mission ended in an acquittal by Supreme Court of Korea. The charge was that Park had sold stock fraudulently to church members and "raked in unlawful profits", but the Supreme Court held that "it is hard to regard Park as an accomplice".

In 2024, Park met with the Chairman of the Kiowa Tribe Lawrence SpottedBird in South Korea. In 2025, the Kiowa Tribe's chairman and vice chairman served on the board of the Indigenous Leaders of North America, a nonprofit Park founded.

== Daughter's conviction ==
On May 15, 2024, a high school girl was rushed to a hospital by emergency services in Incheon after she collapsed with bruises and bindings on both wrists. She died four hours later and the National Forensic Service later announced her cause of death was pulmonary embolism and abuse leading up to her death was suspected. It was later revealed the girl was affiliated with Gracias Choir and had been living with the Good News Mission in the three months prior to her death. During her time living with the group she was subject to constant monitoring, forced to copy the Bible, and forced to repeatedly climb stairs.

In June 2024, the District Prosecutors' Office of Incheon charged Park's daughter, Eun-sook Park, for child abuse resulting in murder. Prosecutors alleged the girl died from being confined for a long period, tied up, and abused. The tight bindings caused blood clots and Park delayed taking her to a hospital. In December 2024, Park was sentenced to 4 and a half years in prison. At a second trial in September 2025, Park Eun-sook was sentenced to 25 years in prison for child abuse resulting in death. In January 2026, the Supreme Court of Korea upheld her conviction from the second trial.

== Acquisition of Gimcheon University ==
Gimcheon University, facing closure after receiving an E grade in the 2016 evaluation and experiencing significant management difficulties, including unpaid staff salaries and a shortfall in student admissions, transferred its management rights to the Good News Mission in 2021. The agreement included inheriting the Christian founding philosophy, job succession, 20 billion KRW in financial support, salary restoration, and management participation until the university is stabilized. Gimcheon University has not officially commented on the transfer to the Good News Mission, which is deemed a cult by the Korean church. The Gimcheon City Christian Council and local churches plan to raise awareness among residents about the cult's risks and the potential harm to the local image.

On April 29, 2024, Gimcheon University amended its academic regulations to establish a "Department of Theology" for the 2025 academic year, aimed at training pastors from the Guwonpa (Salvation Sect). The university also has a Department of Theology in its graduate program to prepare pastors and theologians. Chairman Park Ok-soo announced at a press conference that the university plans to recruit over 500 foreign students annually through its missionary countries and provide financial support amounting to 20 billion KRW.

== Books ==
Park has published a number of books, through his publishing house Good News Publishing, or using self-publishing companies such as Kindle Direct Publishing and Tate Publishing & Enterprises. Titles include

- The Secret of Forgiveness of Sin and Being Born Again (1997), ISBN 9788985422369
- Out from despair (2004), ISBN 9788985422758
- Repentance and Faith (2005), ISBN 9788985422826
- Cain and Abel: The Secret of Forgiveness of Sin and Being Born Again (2005), ASIN B006K4BEZA
- Notes on Genesis 1 (2008), ISBN 9788985422963
- Notes on Genesis 2 (2008), ISBN 9788985422956
- Navigating the Heart: Who Is Dragging You (2013), ISBN 9781628543230
- Standing on the field of the heart (2018), ASIN B07K7NX3KP
- How I Became Free from Sin (2018), ASIN B07MR2M9LV
- Lectures on Offerings of Leviticus - A Four-Book Set (2019), ISBN 9788964430330
- It Is God That Justifieth (2020), ASIN B08DDG9LMB
