= Jiro Ono =

Japanese sushi chef (born 1925)

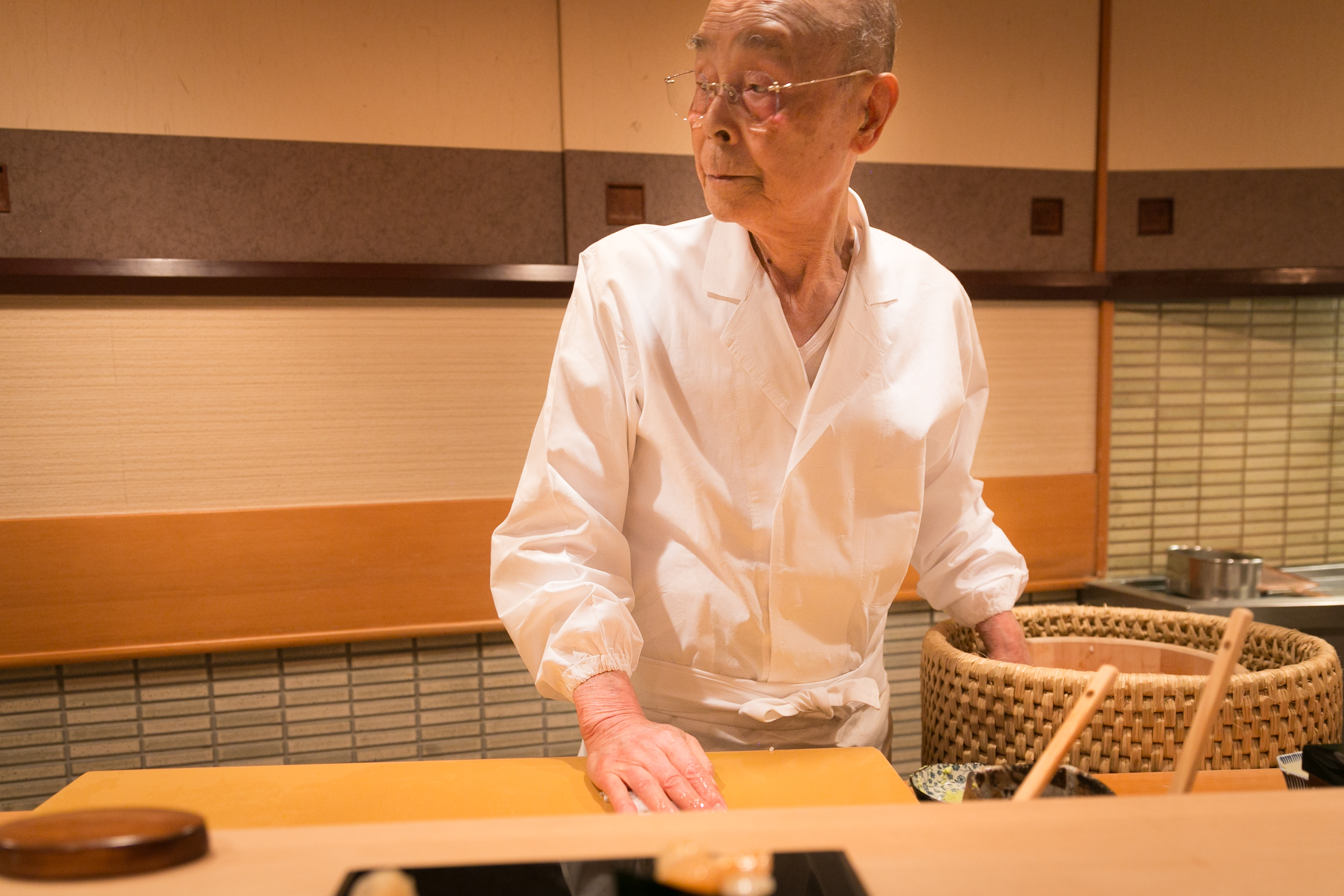
- Ono in 2015
- Born: 27 October 1925 (age 101); Tenryū, Shizuoka, Japan
- Children: 2
- Culinary career
- Cooking style: Sushi
- Current restaurant
- Sukiyabashi Jiro
- Website: www.sushi-jiro.jp/shop-info

Jiro Ono (小野 二郎, Ono Jirō; born 27 October 1925) is a Japanese sushi chef and owner of Sukiyabashi Jiro, a sushi restaurant in Ginza, Chūō, Tokyo, Japan. Ono is regarded by his contemporaries as one of the greatest living sushi craftsmen and is credited with innovating methods used in modern sushi preparation.

== Early years ==
Ono was born in the city of Tenryū (present-day Hamamatsu) in Shizuoka Prefecture, Japan. He started working at a local restaurant from the age of seven, before moving to Tokyo to study as an apprentice. He became a qualified sushi chef in 1951, and in 1965 opened his own restaurant, Sukiyabashi Jiro (すきやばし次郎), in Ginza, Tokyo. (Note: The "Jiro" in the restaurant's name is written differently from "Jiro" in the chef's name.)

== Restaurant ==
Ono has served then Japanese Prime Minister Shinzo Abe and United States President Barack Obama at Sukiyabashi Jiro. Obama stated, "I was born in Hawaii and ate a lot of sushi, but this was the best sushi I've ever had in my life."

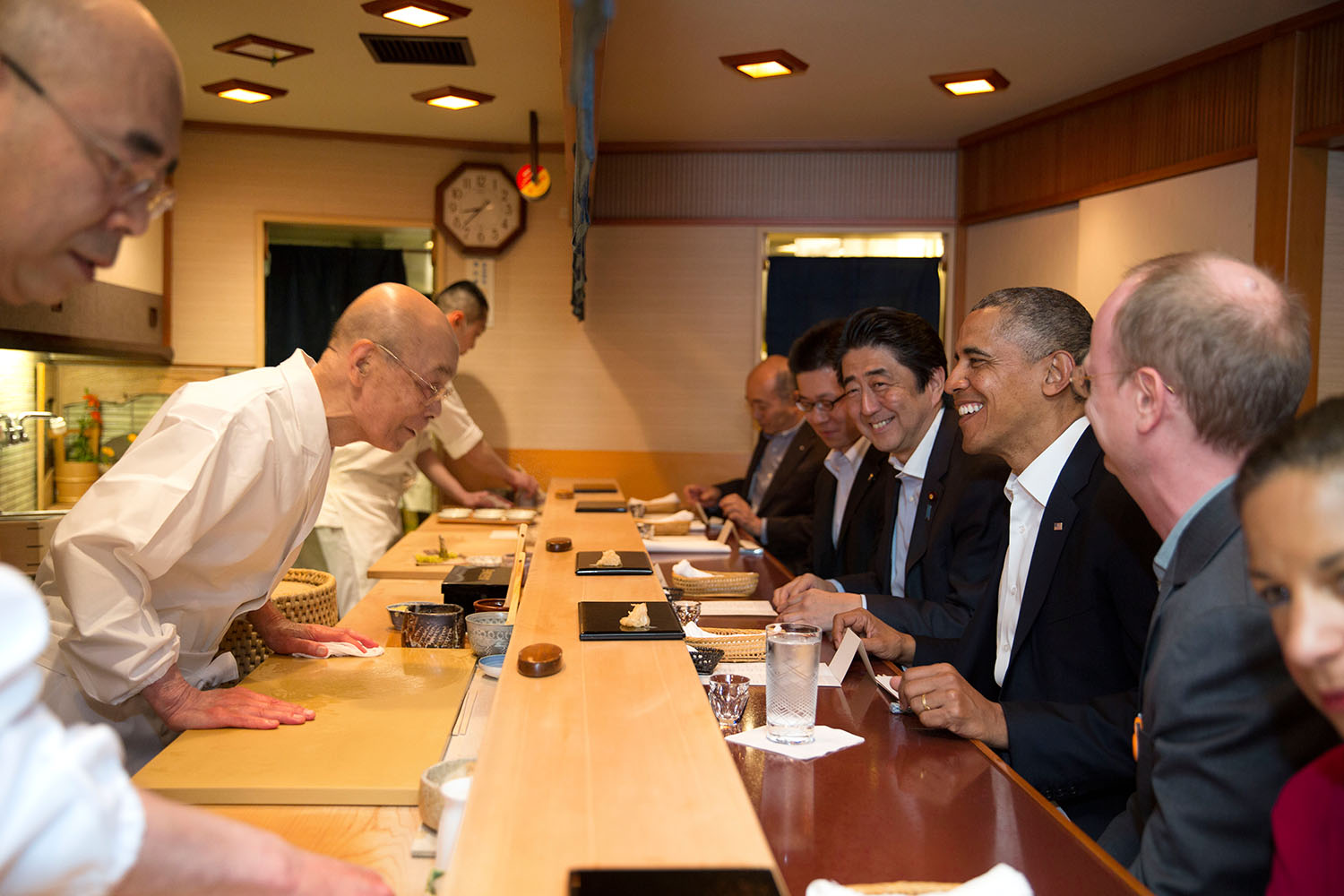
Jiro Ono serving Japanese Prime Minister Shinzo Abe and United States President Barack Obama at Sukiyabashi Jiro in April 2014

== Personal life ==
Ono has two sons, Yoshikazu and Takashi Ono, both of whom are also sushi chefs. Eldest son Yoshikazu has taken over as head chef of Sukiyabashi in 2023. Jiro Takashi, the youngest son, manages his own Michelin-starred sushi restaurant.

Jiro Ono was the subject of David Gelb's 2011 documentary film Jiro Dreams of Sushi. The Onos fear that overfishing will cause key ingredients used in traditional sushi to disappear.

As of 2023, Ono has stepped away from day-to-day management of Sukiyabashi Jiro due to ill health and Yoshikazu now primarily runs the restaurant.

On October 27, 2025, Jiro Ono turned 100. A month before, on Respect for the Aged Day, Ono said he wanted to continue working and making sushi.

== Bibliography ==
- Sushi: Jiro Gastronomy (VIZ Media LLC, 2016) ISBN 9781421589084
