= Port of Mokpo =

- Interactive map of Port of Mokpo

Location
- Country: South Korea
- Location: Mokpo, South Jeolla
- Coordinates: 34°46′N 126°24′E
- UN/LOCODE: KRPUS

Mokpo harbour festival

The Port of Mokpo (Korean: 목포항; Hanja: 木浦港) is a port in South Korea, located in the city of Mokpo, South Jeolla Province. It is also home to the wreck of the MV Sewol, which capsized in 2014 with the loss of over 300 people.
