= Yoyomi =

South Korean singer (born 1994)

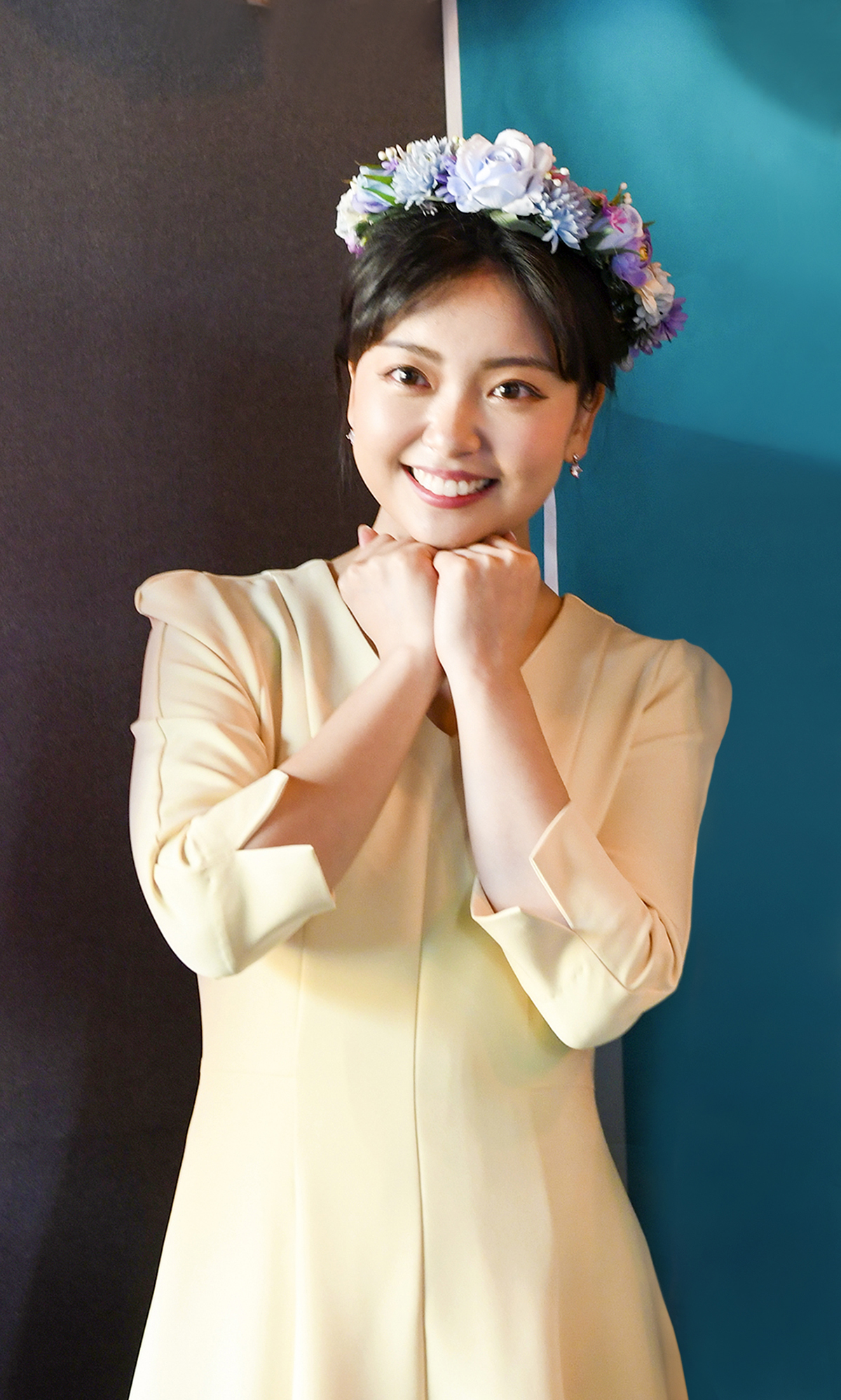
- Born: 박연아; October 8, 1994 (age 31); Cheongju, South Korea
- Occupations: Singer-songwriter; actress
- Musical career
- Genres: K-pop; Trot; Ballad; Dance; R&B; Rock
- Instrument: Vocals
- Years active: 2013–present
- Website: https://www.yoyomi.co.kr/2

Korean name
- Hangul: 박연아
- Hanja: 朴延我
- RR: Bak Yeona
- MR: Pak Yŏna

Stage name
- Hangul: 요요미
- Hanja: 姚姚美
- RR: Yoyomi
- MR: Yoyomi

Bak Yeon-ah (Korean: 박연아; born October 8, 1994), better known as Yoyomi (요요미), is a South Korean trot singer-songwriter and actress.

== Early life ==
Park was born on October 8, 1994, in Cheongju, South Korea. She is a graduate of Cheongju Girls' High School.

As a child, she became interested in trot music from her father, who is a trot singer, and from hearing veteran singer Hyeeunyee on the radio. In 2005, Park won the grand prize in the KBS Open Children's Song World competition.

== Career ==
Park released her first single, "Sorry Sorry," on July 23, 2013, using the stage name Yun-A, but the song was not successful.

She made her debut as Yoyomi on February 23, 2018, with the single album First Story (첫번째 이야기), featuring the title track "Who's That Guy" (이 오빠 뭐야).

In February 2019, she competed in the reality TV series Miss Trot. She made her acting debut in September 2019 in the TV show Seasoning (조미료) playing the character Jeong-soon, an aspiring singer.

In January 2020, Yoyomi performed on the TV show Golden Oldies as a "rising star" of trot music. That March, she competed on King of Mask Singer, where she was eliminated in the second round match. In November, she competed on Immortal Songs: Singing the Legend, beating out other singers to win a trot-themed episode of the TV show.

On February 16, 2021, Yoyomi released the single "Corny Love Song" (촌스러운 사랑노래). The song was written by music producer Park Jin-young and given to Yoyomi after she won an open audition to collaborate with Park. The song debuted and peaked at number 34 on the Circle Download Chart.

== Discography ==
=== Studio albums ===
| Title | Album details |
|---|---|
| Yoplay (요플레) | Released: May 29, 2020; Label: OGAM Entertainment |

=== Single albums and EPs ===
| Title | Album details |
|---|---|
| First Story (첫번째 이야기) | Released: February 23, 2018; Label: OGAM Entertainment |
| Cheers (위하여) | Released: May 9, 2022; Label: OGAM Entertainment |

=== Singles ===
| Title | Year | Album |
|---|---|---|
| "Who's That Guy?" (이 오빠 뭐야) | 2018 | First Story |
| "Alarm of Love" (사랑의 알람) | 2018 | Non-album singles |
| "Is It One?" (일인가봐) | 2018 | Non-album singles |
| "S-Love" | 2018 | Non-album singles |
| "Stew" (찌개) | 2019 | Non-album singles |
| "Please Don't Stop" (멈추지 말아요) | 2019 | Non-album singles |
| "Please Hold Me Tight" (나를 꼭 안아 주세요) | 2019 | Non-album singles |
| "Surely" (꼭꼭꼭) | 2019 | Non-album singles |
| "A Road in My Dream" (꿈길) | 2019 | Non-album singles |
| "How Much More Should I Cry?" (얼마나 더 울어야 하니) | 2019 | Non-album singles |
| "Attracted" (끌려요) | 2019 | Non-album singles |
| "Hong Kong Express" (홍콩익스프레스) | 2019 | Non-album singles |
| "Worried Our Love Will Have Pain" (우리사랑 아파할까봐) | 2019 | Non-album singles |
| "Vitamin C" | 2019 | Non-album singles |
| "If You Love Me" (니가 날 사랑해주면) | 2019 | Non-album singles |
| "I Wanna Know Your Feelings" (알고 싶어 니 마음을) | 2020 | Non-album singles |
| "Woo Zu Zu" (우쭈쭈) | 2020 | Non-album singles |
| "How About Leaving On A UFO" (UFO를 타고 떠나는 건 어때) | 2020 | Non-album singles |
| "Come Back" (돌아와요) | 2020 | Non-album singles |
| "Moving On" | 2020 | Non-album singles |
| "Itgi Eopgi" (있기없기) | 2020 | Non-album singles |
| "I Hope It's Always You" (늘 너이길 바래) | 2020 | Non-album singles |
| "Come See Me" (날 보러 와요) | 2020 | Non-album singles |
| "Pop! Burst" (빵터졌어) | 2020 | Non-album singles |
| "Just What If" (만약 혹시나 만약에) | 2020 | Non-album singles |
| "Juyeonbaeu" (주연배우) | 2020 | Non-album singles |
| "Seuriseuljjeok" (스리슬쩍) | 2020 | Non-album singles |
| "Corny Love Song" (촌스러운 사랑노래) (written by Park Jin-young) | 2021 | Non-album singles |
| "Let's Go" (가자) | 2021 | Non-album singles |
| "Cheers (Rock Mix)" (위하여 Rock Mix) | 2022 | Cheers |
| "Oneora Iri" (오너라 이리) | 2022 | Non-album singles |
| "Foolish Man" (바보 같은 사람) | 2022 | Non-album singles |
| "You Have Your Own Scent" (그대에겐 그대만의 향기가 있어) (with Kim Bum-ryong) | 2023 | Non-album singles |
| "Swimming" | 2023 | Non-album singles |
| "Love is a Beautiful Sad Color" (사랑은 아름다운 슬픈 색이네요) | 2024 | Non-album singles |
| "Fox's Operation" (여우의 작전) | 2024 | Non-album singles |

=== Soundtrack appearances ===
| Title | Year | Album |
|---|---|---|
| "Salmannage" (살맛나게) | 2019 | Seasoning OST |
| "Happy Virus" (해피 바이러스) | 2019 | Seasoning OST |
| "Right This Moment" (지금 이 순간) | 2019 | Right This Moment OST |
| "Life Goes Like That" (사는게 다) | 2021 | Eojjeoda Gajog OST |

== Awards ==
- 2005. KBS 《Open Children's Song World》 Grand Prize
- 2017. 《The 14th Chupungryeong Song Festival》 Encouragement Award
- 2018. 《All Together Asia Awards》 Good deed Prize
- 2018. 《2018 Green Earth Music Show Awards》 Best Trot Award – Women's Category
- 2019. 《2019 World Star Awards》 Trot Category – Popularity Award
- 2019. 《27th Korean Cultural Entertainment Awards》 Trot Category – Rookie Award
- 2019. 《The 11th Seoul Success Grand Prize》 Culture Category – Rookie Singer Grand Prize
- 2020. 《Korean Traditional Music Awards》 Popularity Award
- 2020. 《2020 Korea Creator Grand Prize》 Singer Category
- 2020. KBS 2TV 《Immortal Songs: Singing the Legend》 EP.482, 'Trot National Festival special feature' Part 1, Final Win
- 2020. Youtube 《GoStarBuStar》 'Park Jin-young's <Corny Love Song> Finding the Owner Project', Final Win
- 2021. 《7th Korea Culture & Art Star Grand Prize Awards》 Popularity Award
- 2021. 《27th Korea Entertainment Arts Awards》 Trot Category - Rookie Award
- 2022. 《2022 Global Beauty & Culture Awards》 Music Category - Grand Prize
- 2022. 《The 8 Korea Art And Culture Star Awards》 Trot Popularity Award
- 2022. 《28th Korea Entertainment Arts Awards》 Netizen Award
- 2023. 《The 9 Korea Art And Culture Star Awards》 Star Trot Popularity Award
- 2023. 《2023 6th Gayo TV Music Awards》 Trot Category - Grand Prize

== Other activities ==
- 2018. News Portal 《1004 Club Sharing Community》 Ambassador
- 2018. 《Green Ribbon Environment》 Ambassador
- 2019. 《Suncheon》 Honorary Ambassador
- 2020. 《Kumyoung Entertainment》 Ambassador
- 2020. 《Enhancing Digital Capabilities》 Ambassador
