= Good News Mission =

- Location: Worldwide
- Website: www.goodnewsmission.net

History
- Founded: 1972
- Founder: Ock Soo Park

Good News Mission (GNM; Korean: 기쁜소식선교회; RR: gi-ppeun-so-sik-sseon-gyo-hoe) is a South Korean Christian-based new religious movement founded in 1971 by pastor Ock Soo Park. It is one of several new religious movements in Korea referred to as Guwonpa (Salvation Sect).

== History ==
The first Good News church was established in 1972 by Ock Soo Park and became a mission when the missionary school was established in 1976, taking over the existing missionary school in place of the returning orthodox evangelical missionaries. In the early years, Park conducted vocation Bible schools for the youth in the nearby villages, served as a spiritual counselor at Suwon Prison, and went on witness trips to leper colonies. In the early 1990s, the mission sent its first missionaries to Germany and the United States. Missionaries sent to Kenya in the mid-1990s faced problems with religious registration as foreign groups were denied such registration unless sponsored by a native Kenyan church. Eventually, religious registration was granted to them. In the early 2000s, missionaries were dispatched to South Africa, Brazil, Czech Republic, Dominican Republic, Turkey, and Uzbekistan.

According to the church webpage, it currently has 170 churches in South Korea and 838 international churches.

== Doctrine ==
=== Antinomianism (Rejection of the Law) ===
Good News Mission teaches that the law was abolished at the cross, and therefore, those who are saved no longer need to be bound by or feel guilty about following the law. As a result, they reject practices such as observing the Sabbath, tithing, fasting, early morning prayer, and even a regular prayer life, considering these to be part of the law that no longer applies to believers. They claim that once saved, believers are completely free from the law's requirements, citing Romans 7 as their basis. This antinomian doctrine is considered a clear heresy with numerous issues. Without the law, sin itself cannot be defined. Consequently, they teach that there is no need to repent even if one sins. This leads to a life of licentiousness, where sin is no longer regarded as sin. Furthermore, without the law, the pursuit of sanctification (a holy life) is rendered meaningless. Sanctification is based on the law; thus, if the law is abolished, sanctification is effectively abolished as well.

== Controversies ==
=== Lies and Deceptive Proselytism ===
In 2011, 400 volunteer English teachers, including a number of young college students, were led to believe that they were recruited to teach English in Mexico. The preparatory meeting, called "English Camp", included religious lectures on the topic of sin, which took place in ballrooms guarded by security personnel that discouraged members from leaving. Participants who were considered "tardy" were subjected to physical punishment such as being made to do squat-thrust exercises. One of the college students attending the event said, "I was the victim of a scam."

The organisation's activities in Nagaland, India, as well as in Uganda where religious material from the Good News Mission has been used in public schools, have also been questioned.

=== The Ink Attack Incident on Hyundae Jongyo ===
Members of the Good News Mission were apprehended by the police and eventually fined after carrying out an ink attack on Hyundae Jongyo, a magazine specializing in cult issues. On October 18, 2018, four men stormed into the Hyundae Jongyo office, throwing eggs and splashing black ink and red liquid, causing a shocking scene. Among them, one man, unable to control his anger, shouted, "I'll go to jail, you bastards!" while wreaking havoc in the office. As a result, they were held legally accountable, facing both civil and criminal charges.

=== Incheon High School Girl Death Incident ===
A high school girl was killed due to abuse by Eun-sook Park, the director of the Gracias Choir affiliated with the Good News Mission. The girl was sent to the church by her mother after being persuaded by the choir’s offer to take care of her mental health treatment. The girl endured severe mistreatment, including being deprived of sleep, confinement, and being monitored by church members. Over a period of five days, the girl was forced to transcribe the Bible and repeatedly climb stairs for an hour, leading to severe physical deterioration. She eventually lost control of her bodily functions and was unable to eat. After losing consciousness, she died four hours later. Eun-sook Park, director of the Gracias Choir and daughter of Pastor Ock Soo Park, denied any involvement in or connection to the events leading to the death of the high school student. At the sentencing hearing held on November 25, 2024, the prosecution sought life imprisonment for Park Eun-sook and 30 years in prison for her accomplices. Park Eun-sook and her accomplices were each sentenced to four years and six months in prison at the end of their first trial. At a second trial in September 2025, Park Eun-sook was sentenced to 25 years in prison for child abuse resulting in death. In January 2026, the Supreme Court of Korea upheld her conviction from the second trial.

=== Controversy over kimcheon university's new theology department ===
Kimcheon University announced that it will establish a theology department and start admitting new students for the 2025 academic year. Concerns have arisen that this Christian private university may become a training ground for a sectarian group. Yoon Jong-soo, appointed as head of the theology department, is also the senior pastor at Good News Kimcheon Church. The university stated that there are no administrative issues, as Pastor Yoon has received approval to hold both positions.
