= Jiro Dreams of Sushi =

2011 film by David Gelb

- Promotional release poster
- Directed by: David Gelb
- Produced by: Kevin Iwashina; Tom Pellegrini
- Starring: Jiro Ono
- Cinematography: David Gelb
- Edited by: Brandon Driscoll-Luttringer
- Distributed by: Magnolia Pictures
- Release dates: June 11, 2011 (Provincetown IFF); March 9, 2012 (United States)
- Running time: 81 minutes
- Country: United States
- Language: Japanese
- Box office: $2.5 million

Jiro Dreams of Sushi is a 2011 Japanese-language American documentary film directed by David Gelb. The film follows Jiro Ono (小野 二郎, Ono Jirō), a then-85-year-old sushi master and owner of Sukiyabashi Jiro, then a Michelin three-star restaurant. Sukiyabashi Jiro is a 10-seat, sushi-only restaurant located in a Tokyo subway station. As of 2026, Jiro Ono serves a tasting menu of roughly 20 courses, for a minimum of JP¥88,000 (US$557).

The film also profiles Jiro's two sons, both of whom are also sushi chefs. The younger son, Takashi (隆士), left Sukiyabashi Jiro to open a mirror image of his father's restaurant in Roppongi Hills. The 50-year-old elder son, Yoshikazu (禎一), obliged to succeed his father, still works for Jiro and is faced with the prospect of one day taking over the flagship restaurant.

== Production and release ==
Initially, Gelb had planned to do what he had nicknamed "Planet Sushi", inspired by the cinematography of the BBC documentary Planet Earth:

Originally, I was going to make a film with a lot of different sushi chefs who all had different styles, but when I got to Jiro's restaurant, I was not only amazed by how good the sushi was and how much greater it was than any other sushi restaurant I had ever been to, but I also found Jiro to be such a compelling character and such an interesting person. I was also fascinated by the story of his son, who is fifty years old, but still works for his father at the restaurant. So, I thought, "Here's a story about a person living in his father's shadow while his father is in a relentless pursuit of perfection." It was the makings of a good feature film.

Food critic Masuhiro Yamamoto connected Gelb with Jiro. Principal photography took Gelb one month (January 2010), augmented by additional scenes shot later that year in August; editing took 10 months.

Jiro Dreams of Sushi debuted in the US in 2011 at the Tribeca Film Festival and was an official selection of the Provincetown International Film Festival in the same year. The documentary was made available on Netflix streaming on August 28, 2012.

As of 2013, the film has grossed US$2,552,478 in North America. It is ranked 70th of all US documentaries on Box Office Mojo.

== Critical reception ==
The film earned a rating of 99% on Rotten Tomatoes based on 93 reviews and an average rating of 7.8/10. The site's critical consensus reads, "Beautiful, thoughtful, and engrossing, Jiro Dreams of Sushi should prove satisfying even for filmgoers who don't care for the cuisine." On Metacritic, the film has a score of 77 out of 100, based on 27 reviews, indicating "generally favorable" reviews.

Roger Ebert called it a "portrait of tunnel vision" and concluded:

While watching it, I found myself drawn into the mystery of this man. Are there any unrealized wishes in his life? Secret diversions? Regrets? If you find an occupation you love and spend your entire life working at it, is that enough? Standing behind his counter, Jiro notices things. Some customers are left-handed, some right-handed. That helps determine where they are seated at his counter. As he serves a perfect piece of sushi, he observes it being eaten. He knows the history of that piece of seafood. He knows his staff has recently started massaging an octopus for 45 minutes and not half an hour, for example. Does he search a customer's eyes for a signal that this change has been an improvement? Half an hour of massage was good enough to win three Michelin stars.

== Soundtrack ==
Gelb, a "huge Philip Glass fan", has commented on his use of Philip Glass compositions in the film's soundtrack:

In hindsight, I think it works because Philip Glass's music is kind of a metaphor for Jiro's work ethic, because it's repetitive but it also builds on itself and escalates, and it's the same with Jiro's work. Because every day he's going, he's doing the same routine, and trying to do everything exactly the same, but just reaching for that one step of improvement, and I feel like the music's doing the same thing, so they match perfectly.

The soundtrack includes the following:

1. Tchaikovsky: Concerto for Violin and Orchestra in D, Opus 35 – Allegro Moderato. Jascha Heifetz (violin), John Barbirolli/London Philharmonic Orchestra
2. Philip Glass: "I'm Going to Go Make a Cake" from the soundtrack The Hours
3. Max Richter: "Berlin by Overnight"
4. Glass: "Morning Passages" from the soundtrack of The Hours
5. Richter: "On the Nature of Daylight"
6. Richter: "Infra 5"
7. Glass: "Gertrude Leave the Summer House" from In the summer house
8. Glass: Etude No. 5
9. The Ontic: "Off to Market"
10. Anugama: "African Journey" from Album "Exotic Dance"
11. Glass: "A Choice" from the soundtrack of The Hours
12. Glass: String Quartet No. 4 Buzcak: I. Kronos Quartet
13. Glass: Etude No. 2
14. Mozart: Piano Concerto No. 21 in C, K. 467 – Andante. Alfred Brendel (piano), Neville Marriner/Academy of St. Martin in the Fields
15. Bach and Michael Kohlbecker: Cello Suite no. 1: Prelude. Performed by Fûnf D.
16. Glass: "The Hours" from the soundtrack of The Hours
17. Glass: "Invitation" from the soundtrack of Notes on a Scandal

== See also ==
- Chef's Table — a food documentary series created by Gelb
