= Corny Love Song =

2021 single by J. Y. Park and Yoyomi

Single by J. Y. Park and Yoyomi
- Released: February 10, 2021
- Genre: Country; Trot
- Length: 3:54
- Label: JYP
- Songwriter: J. Y. Park
- Producer: J. Y. Park

J. Y. Park singles chronology
"Switch to Me" (2020)	"Corny Love Song" (2021)	"Groove Back" (2022)

Yoyomi singles chronology
"Seuriseuljjeok" (2020)	"Corny Love Song" (2021)	"Let's Go" (2021)

Music video
- "Corny Love Song" on YouTube

"Corny Love Song" (Korean: 촌스러운 사랑노래; RR: Chonseureoun Sarangnorae) is a song by South Korean singer-songwriter J. Y. Park under the pseudonym PD J. Y. Park, with vocals provided by trot singer Yoyomi. It was released by JYP Entertainment as a digital single on February 10, 2021.

== Background ==
In 2020, on the September 18 episode of singer Rain's internet vlog series Season B Season, J. Y. Park unveiled "Corny Love Song", a song that he has written but could not find a suitable singer for. On October 4, Park released a teaser to an upcoming project series titled JY Park Hard Drive Release. The project's synopsis entails Park's pursuit to find singers for songs he had written and stored on his hard drive, with "Corny Love Song" being the first song in the series.

On November 24, 2020, singer Kim Tae-woo, under his YouTube channel GoStar BuStar, released the teaser for the upcoming episode of his internet series, featuring him and Park hosting auditions for the singer of "Corny Love Song". Contestants that participated include singer Geum Jan-di, character Pengsoo, comedian Copychu, singers Yoyomi, KCM, and Kwon Jin-ah, trio SoonSoonHee, and YouTubers Glowmom, Bright Melodies, and Ji-hyun.

In January 2021, Park debuted the series JY Park Hard Drive Release, beginning with "Corny Love Song" which would be sung by Yoyomi. On February 1, JYP Entertainment announced through the release of a teaser poster that "Corny Love Song" will be released on February 10. Two additional teaser posters were released on February 3 and 5. On February 10, the song was released digitally, along with its accompanying music video.

== Composition ==
"Corny Love Song" was written and composed by J. Y. Park. Additionally, Kim Seung-soo assisted in the song arrangement. Musically, the song has been described as a "Countrot" song – a mix of American country music and Korean trot music. A vacuum tube microphone and preamplifiers were used in the recording to reproduce the analog sound reminiscence of the 1970s.

== Credits and personnel ==
Adapted from Melon credits:

- PD J. Y. Park - performer
- Yoyomi – vocals
- J. Y. Park – lyrics, composition, arrangement
- Kim Seung-soo – arrangement

== Charts ==
Chart performance for "Corny Love Song"
Chart (2021)	Peak position
South Korea Download (Circle)	34

== Release history ==
Release history for "Corny Love Song"
Region	Date	Format	Label
Various	February 10, 2021	Digital download; streaming	JYP
