= Evangelical Baptist Church of Korea =

Christian new religious movement

- Evangelical Baptist Church
- Hangul: 기독교복음침례회
- Hanja: 基督教福音浸禮會
- Revised Romanization: Gidokgyo Bogeum Chimnyehoe
- McCune–Reischauer: Kidokkyo Pogŭm Ch'imnyehoe

Former name: Korean Evangelical Layman's Church
- Hangul: 한국평신도복음선교회
- Hanja: 韓國平信徒福音宣敎會
- Revised Romanization: Hanguk Pyeongsindo Bogeum Seongyohoe
- McCune–Reischauer: Han'guk P'yŏngsindo Pogŭm Sŏn'gyohoe

Colloquial name: "Salvation Sect"
- Hangul: 구원파
- Hanja: 救援派
- Revised Romanization: Guwonpa
- McCune–Reischauer: Kuwŏnp'a

The Evangelical Baptist Church (EBC) of Korea (Korean: 기독교복음침례회; officially Korean Evangelical Baptist Church – formerly known as Korean Laymen's Evangelical Fellowship) was established in 1962 by Yoo Byung-eun and Pastor Kwon Shin-chan (권신찬; 1923–96). The name of the church was changed to EBC in 1981. It is not connected to the Korea Baptist Convention. In South Korea, EBC is commonly known as Guwonpa, meaning Salvation Sect, from the Korean term guwon (구원), "salvation".

Many sources estimate that the movement has 20,000 members, but media reports on numbers of followers vary from 10,000 to as many as 200,000 members worldwide. In 2014, the organization claimed to have 100,000 followers.

Media outlets claimed that the EBC doctrines teach that those who were once saved by God are completely detached from the sins they will ever commit in the future and guaranteed a path to heaven. The EBC denied having any such doctrine. Although the conservative General Assembly of Presbyterian Churches called the movement a cult, in 1992, there was later a correction statement saying that the EBC preaches doctrines that are consistent with Christianity and does not contradict the Bible. Nor do they worship a particular individual as a religious sect leader.

== Odaeyang mass suicide ==
In 1987 South Korean police were investigating accusations against a 48-year-old woman, Park Soon-ja, saying that she had swindled ₩8.9 billion (US$8.7 million) from about 220 people. Her company Odaeyang Trading Co. was a firm that fronted for a religious sect led by Park, which some reports claimed was connected to Yoo Byung-eun’s Evangelical Baptist Church (the Salvation Sect). However, after three separate investigations by the prosecution in 1987, 1989, and 1991 under different administrations, all concluded that it was not related to Yoo Byung-eun or the Evangelical Baptist Church and although corrections were issued, they were not widely publicized. On 29 August, thirty-two members of the sect who believed in doomsday, including Park Soon-ja and her three children, were found dead, bound and gagged. The case became known as the Odaeyang mass suicide. Police assumed the event was a murder–suicide pact, and the prosecution initially suspected that Yoo Byung-eun was linked to the case. Also, there were claims that Park Soon-ja, the head of Odaeyang Church gave a large amount of money to the EBC members, and that the money flowed back to Semo. However, it was later found that this was a transaction between an EBC member and Park Soon-Ja before Odeyang was established and the police closed the case as a mass suicide.. Yoo Byung-eun was arrested in connection with the Odaeyang incident, but investigations revealed that he was not involved in the case. However, after his arrest, he was convicted of "habitual fraud under the mask of religion" and sentenced to four years in prison for a separate, previously dismissed case, in which he had allegedly colluded with one of his employees to collect ₩12 billion (approximately US$1.15 million) from church members and invest it in his businesses. As a result, although he was not actually involved in the Odaeyang incident, he came to be perceived as the mastermind behind it. Yoo Byung-eun also maintained his innocence regarding the charges of habitual fraud. In November 2014, the Incheon District Prosecutor's Office stated in a report that they did not find a prosecutable connection between Yoo's Evangelical Baptist Church and the Odaeyang incident.

== Sinking of Sewol ==
The ferry Sewol capsized and sank on 16 April 2014, resulting in 304 people dead or missing, the second worst ferry disaster in South Korean history. Sewol was operated by the company Chonghaejin Marine, of which Yoo Byung-eun was the former chairman. Despite initial media reports, Yoo retired from Chonghaejin Marine Ltd in 1997, and had not been involved in this company’s operations since then.

Yoo Byung-eun was known to mainly have resided in a rural church compound called "Geumsuwon" (금수원) located east of Anseong in the Gyeonggi Province some 80 kilometres (50 mi) south of Seoul. Yoo had a photography workshop there, and according to his publicist Michael Ham, managing director of Ahae Press and co-director of Evangelical Media Group, Yoo began obsessively focusing on his photography work in 2009, spending every day completely dedicated to his photography for more than four years—allegedly taking about 2.7 million photographs during this time, all through one window. Members of the group run the 760,000 square metres (8,200,000 sq ft) compound Geumsuwon as a commune where they grow organic produce and run a freshwater fish farm.

On 23 April, investigators of the Incheon District Prosecutors' Office raided the head office of Chonghaejin Marine, and some 20 offices of its affiliates, as well as the office of the Evangelical Baptist Church in Yongsan, central Seoul. Prosecutors initially suspected that funds from members of the religious group had been used in business operations of Chonghaejin Marine and Yoo Byung-eun. However, this suspicion turned out to be incorrect. Yoo Byung-eun did not embezzle from the EBC nor did he expand his businesses by its members' donations.

On 24 April, a financier of the Evangelical Baptist Church was summoned for questioning to trace deals between the group and companies run by Yoo and his two sons. Transcripts of land registers showed that four days later on 28 and 29 April, Yoo and his family signed over some 24 properties worth around ₩27 billion (~US$26 million) to the Evangelical Baptist Church. It was later found that reports of his wealth incorrectly included real estate properties owned by farming associations, which had been established by church members.

On 28 April, 600 members of the Evangelical Baptist Church staged a protest rally in front of the headquarters of the Korea Broadcasting System in Yeouido, Seoul against media coverage of, and the investigation into the group's links to the operator of the ferry Sewol, denying suspicions that the Evangelical Baptist Church had cross-border transactions with affiliates of the ferry operator.

Prosecutors warned on 24 May that anyone found helping Yoo in hiding would face up to three years in prison. Four members of the EBC were arrested on 25 May for assisting Yoo to escape detection by the police. On 26 May, EBC, in an apparent move to confuse investigators, said that Yoo might have returned early in the morning to Geumsuwon. A spokesperson for the church later announced that Yoo had not returned, further saying, "We hope Yoo doesn't get arrested. A 100,000 members will protect Yoo. Even if the entire congregation of 100,000 believers is arrested, we won't hand him over." Lee Jae-ok, one of Yoo's close aides, was arrested on 26 May on charges of planning Yoo's life as a fugitive and helping him evade detection for weeks.

In July, an unidentified corpse that police had found in a plum field in Suncheon was confirmed as Yoo's.
