= Sukiyabashi Jiro =

Sushi restaurant in Tokyo

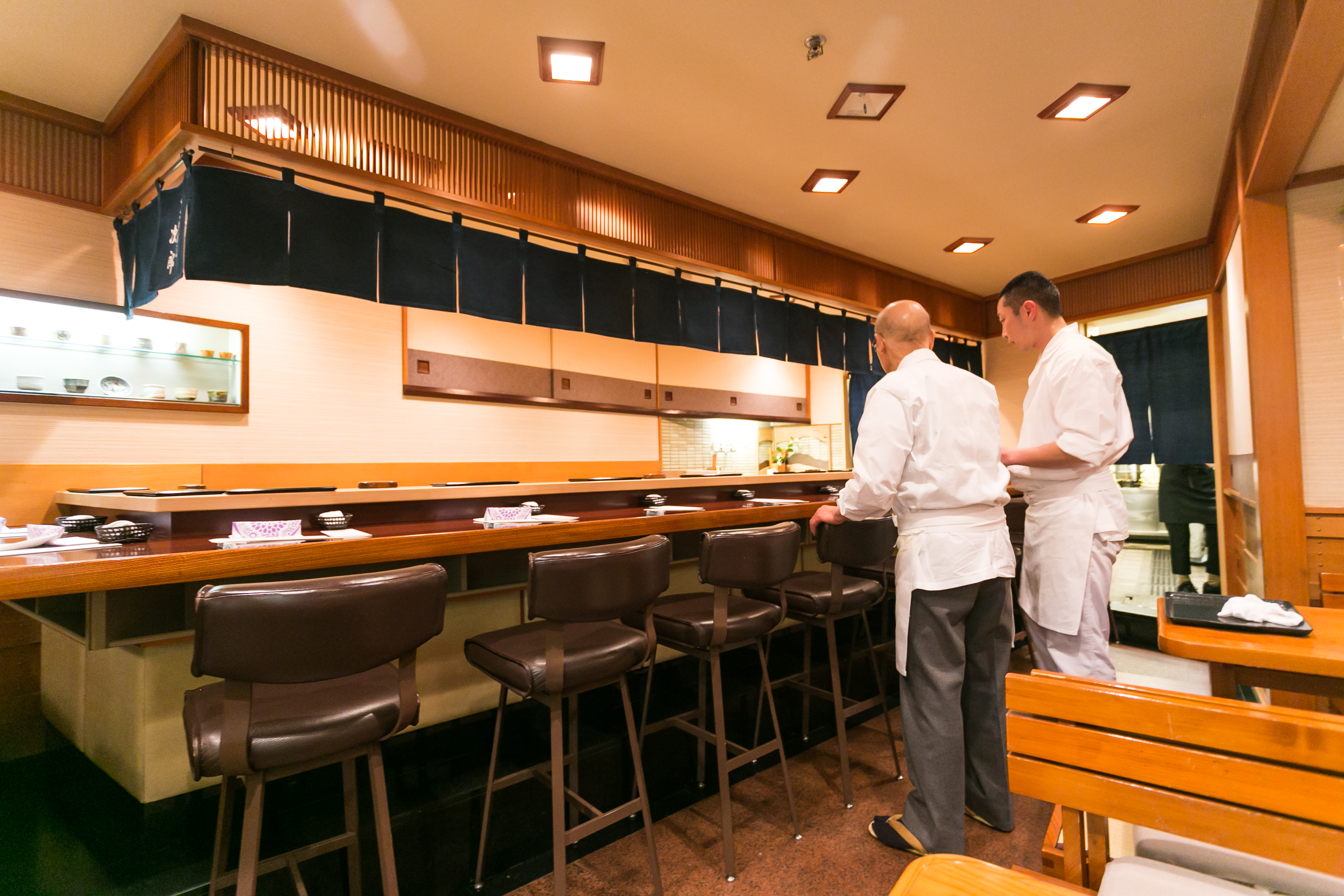
- Interactive map of Sukiyabashi Jiro

Restaurant information
- Owner: Jiro Ono
- Head chef: Jiro Ono (before 2023), Yoshikazu Ono (by 2023–present)
- Food type: Sushi
- Rating: Michelin guide (2007-2019)
- Location: Tsukamoto Sogyo Building; Basement Floor 1; 2-15, Ginza 4-chome, Chūō, Tokyo, Japan
- Coordinates: 35°40′21.58″N 139°45′50.54″E
- Reservations: Required
- Other locations: Roppongi Hills
- Website: www.sushi-jiro.jp/dining-at-jiro/

Sukiyabashi Jiro (すきやばし次郎, Sukiyabashi Jirō) is a sushi restaurant in Ginza, Chūō, Tokyo, owned by Jiro Ono. Ono previously operated as the head chef, but stepped aside in favor of his son Yoshikazu Ono in 2023 due to ill health.

Sukiyabashi Jiro was the first sushi restaurant to receive three stars from the Michelin Guide. It was removed from the Michelin Guide in November 2019 as it does not receive reservations from the general public, instead requiring reservations to be made through the concierge of a luxury hotel. The restaurant has ten counter seats. Jiro's son Takashi operates a two-star branch in Roppongi Hills in Minato, Tokyo.

The French chef Joël Robuchon said that the restaurant was one of his favorites in the world, and that it taught him that sushi is an art. Sukiyabashi Jiro was the subject of the 2011 documentary Jiro Dreams of Sushi.

== Fire ==
There was a fire at the restaurant on the morning of 24 June 2013. Firefighters said that a sushi chef had been using straw to smoke bonito, and that the straw most likely ignited after he returned it to the storeroom. The fire took about an hour to extinguish. There were no injuries.

== Barack Obama visit ==
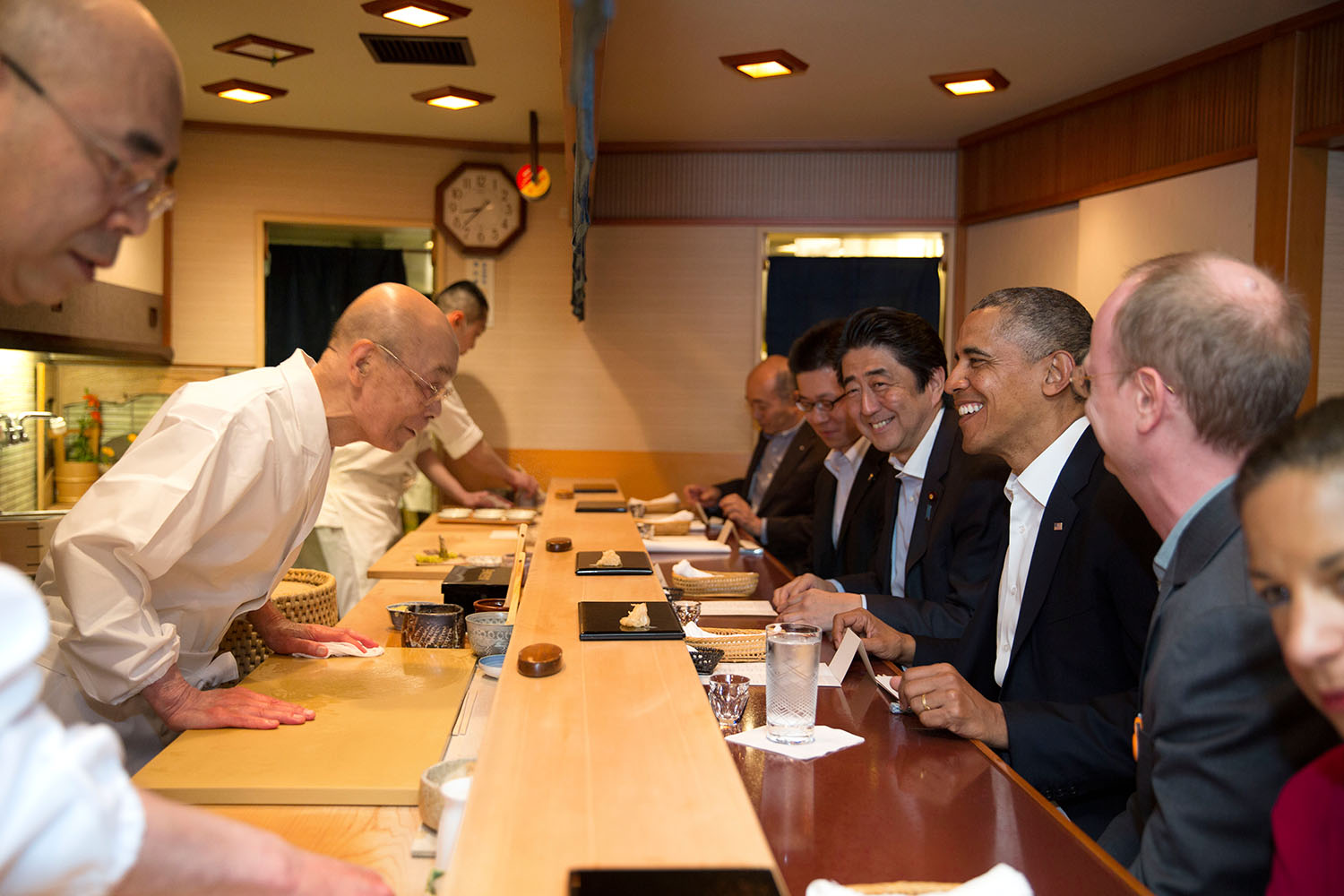
Prime Minister Abe and President Obama at Sukiyabashi Jiro in April 2014

US President Barack Obama dined at the restaurant with Japanese Prime Minister Shinzō Abe on 23 April 2014. There are conflicting reports as to whether Obama finished the sushi, though Abe said Obama proclaimed it the best he had ever had.

== See also ==
- List of Japanese restaurants
- List of Michelin 3-star restaurants
- List of Michelin-starred restaurants in Tokyo
- List of sushi restaurants
