= Salvation Sect =

Salvation Sect (Korean: 구원파; Hanja: 救援派; RR: gu-won-pa) from the Korean word for "salvation", guwon (Korean: 구원; RR: gu-won), may refer to any of the following sects:

- Evangelical Baptist Church of Korea, known as the Evangelical Layman's Church before 1981
- Good News Mission
- Life Word Mission
- Lakewood Central Church established by Peter Yoon
