= MV Sewol =

South Korean ferry

Coordinates: 34°45′31″N 126°21′03″E

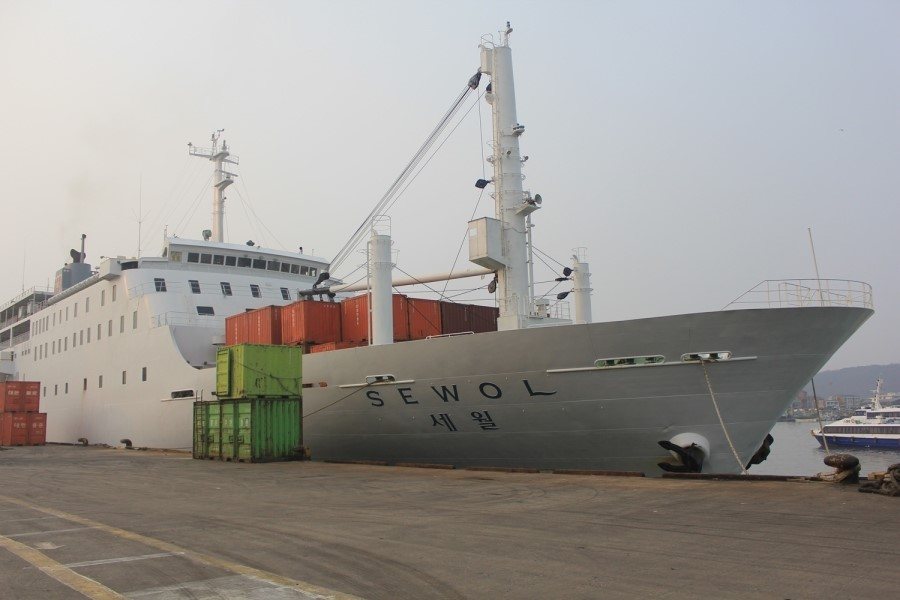
- MV Sewol at Incheon in March 2014, one month prior to disaster

History
- Name: Ferry Naminoue (1994–2012); Sewol (2013–2014)
- Owner: Oshima Unyu, Kagoshima, Japan (1994–2007); A-Line Ferry Company, Kagoshima, Japan (2007–2012); Chonghaejin Marine, Incheon, South Korea (2012–2014)
- Port of registry: Naze, Japan (1994–2012); Incheon, South Korea (2012–2014)
- Builder: Hayashikane Shipbuilding & Engineering Co. Ltd., Nagasaki, Japan
- Yard number: 1006
- Launched: 13 April 1994
- Completed: June 1994
- Identification: IMO number: 9105205
- Fate: Capsized and sank on 16 April 2014, Salvaged 2017

General characteristics
- Type: RoPax ferry
- Tonnage: 6,835 GT; 3,794 DWT
- Length: 145.61 m (477 ft 9 in)
- Beam: 22.00 m (72 ft 2 in)
- Draught: 6.26 m (20 ft 6 in)
- Depth: 14.00 m (45 ft 11 in)
- Installed power: 2 × Diesel United-Pielstick 12PC2-6V-400; 11,912 kW (15,974 hp) (combined)
- Propulsion: Two shafts; fixed pitch propellers; Bow and stern thrusters
- Speed: 21.5 knots (39.8 km/h; 24.7 mph)
- Capacity: As Sewol: 921 passengers, 88 cars, 60 8-ton trucks; As Ferry Naminoue: 804 passengers, 90 cars, and 60 trucks
- Crew: 35

MV Sewol (Hangul: 세월호, Hanja: 世越號, Beyond the World) (Note: The meaning has been widely, but incorrectly, reported as 歲月, 'time and tide.') was a South Korean vehicle-passenger ferry, built and previously operated in Japan. She operated between Incheon and Jeju. On 16 April 2014, the ferry capsized and sank with the loss of 304 passengers and crew.

== Description ==
Sewol was a RoPax ferry that was built by the Japanese company Hayashikane Shipbuilding & Engineering Co. Ltd. (Japanese: 林兼船渠) in 1994. At 146 m (479 ft) in length and 22 m (72 ft) in width, the ferry could carry 921 passengers, or a total of 956 persons, including the crew. The ferry had a legal capacity for 180 vehicles and 154 regular cargo containers. At 22 knots (41 km/h; 25 mph) its range was up to 264 miles (425 km).

== Operations ==
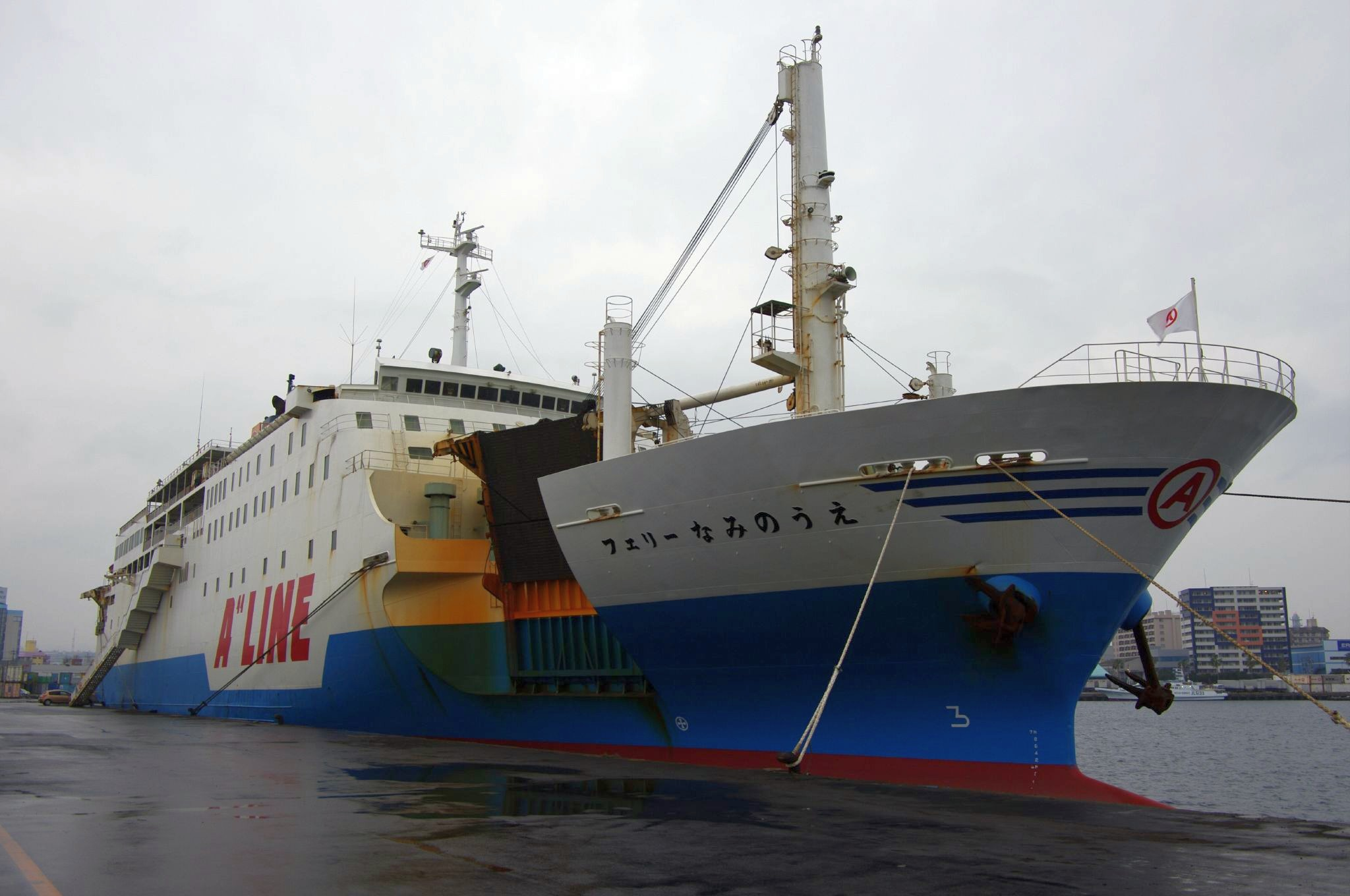
Ferry Naminoue in 2010; the side ramp was removed after she was sold to her South Korean owners

The ferry was originally known as Ferry Naminoue (Japanese: フェリーなみのうえ) between 1994 and 2012, and had been operated in Japan for almost 18 years without any accidents. In 2012, the ship was bought for ₩11.6 billion (US$11.3 million) by Chonghaejin Marine Company, controlled by the family of businessman Yoo Byung-eun. The ship was renamed Sewol, and refurbished. Modifications included adding extra passenger cabins on the third, fourth, and fifth decks, raising the passenger capacity by 117, and increasing the weight of the ship by 239 tons. After regulatory and safety checks by the Korean Register of Shipping, the ship began her operation in South Korea on 15 March 2013. The ship made three round-trips every week from Incheon to Jeju. In February 2014 it was reported that Sewol again passed a vessel safety inspection by the South Korean Coast Guard following an intermediate survey to ensure the ship remained in a general condition which satisfied requirements set by the Korean Register of Shipping.

== Sinking ==
On the evening of 15 April 2014, Sewol departed Incheon for a standard overnight crossing to Jeju Island. The ferry was crewed by a complement of 33 and was carrying 443 passengers, 325 of whom were second-year students from Danwon High School in Ansan. The following morning, Sewol capsized and sank 1.5 kilometers (0.9 mi) off Donggeochado, Jindo County, South Jeolla Province. Of the 476 people on board, there were only 172 survivors. 304 of those on board died, 250 of whom were Danwon students.

The South Korea government's Board of Audit and Inspection revealed that the Korean Register's licensing was based on falsified documents. After the incident, the company reported that the ship was carrying 124 cars, 56 trucks, and 1157 tons of cargo. The amount of cargo carried was twice the legal limit.

On 12 February 2015, Kim Kyung-il, the coastguard captain responsible for rescue efforts, was sentenced to four years in prison for negligence and falsified reporting.

== Salvage ==
In April 2015, a technical report concluded that it was feasible to raise the wreck of Sewol, and President Park said she hoped that it would be carried out as soon as possible. Following the receipt of tenders from salvage companies, it was announced on 15 July 2015 that a consortium led by China's Shanghai Salvage Company was the favoured bidder, at a cost of 85.1 billion won (US$74.6 million).

On 22 March 2017, salvage operations began to raise the wreck of the sunken Sewol. The vessel was raised on 23 March. The wreck was moved onshore at Mokpo on 12 April. The vessel was searched for the remains of the nine missing victims.

While the lifted ferry was transported on board a semi-submersible vessel, her weight was estimated to be 17,000 tonnes, including the contribution of remaining mud inside. In terms of weight and number of axle lines (600), it doubled the world record for transport by SPMTs.

=== Wreck location ===
As of April 2024, the wreck of Sewol remains onshore at the Port of Mokpo.

== Film ==
Reset, a documentary film about the Sewol incident by Korean-Canadian filmmaker Min Bae, was released in 2022.
