= Chonghaejin Marine =

South Korean shipping company

Chonghaejin Marine Co. Ltd.
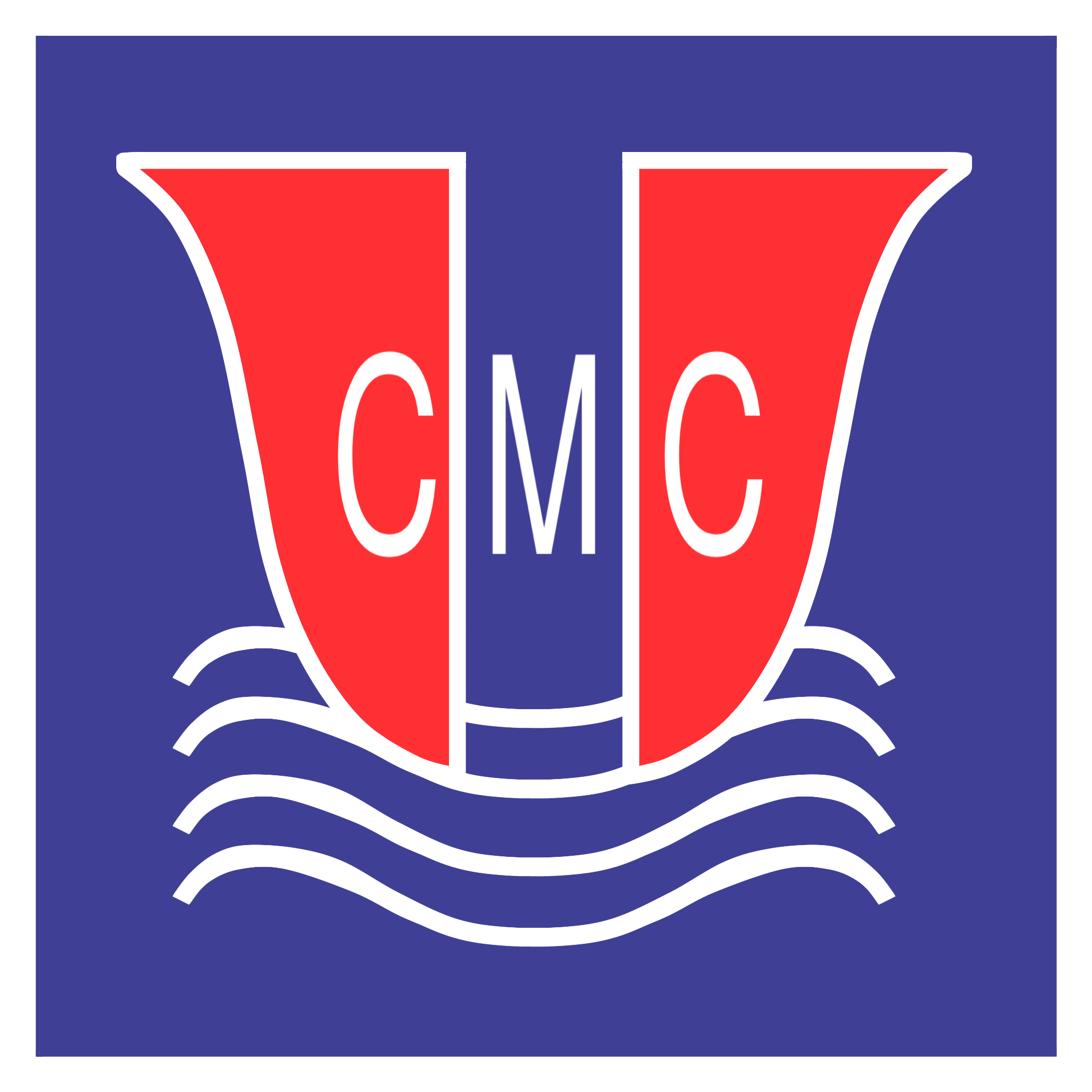
- Native name: Hangul: 청해진해운; Hanja: 淸海鎭海運
- Type: Shipping
- Founded: 24 February 1999
- Defunct: 9 May 2016
- Fate: Bankruptcy after Sinking of MV Sewol
- Headquarters: Incheon, South Korea
- Key people: Kim Han-sik, CEO; Yoo Byung-eun (former Chairman)
- Products: Shipping

Chonghaejin Marine Company Ltd. or Cheonghaejin Marine Company Ltd. (Korean: 청해진해운; Hanja: 淸海鎭海運; RR: cheong-hae-jin-hae-un) was a South Korean shipping company.

It is known for having operated the ferry MV Sewol, which sank en route from Incheon towards Jeju in 2014. The Sewol capsized in the Maenggol Channel carrying 476 people, mostly secondary school students from Danwon High School; 172 passengers and crew survived, while 304 drowned or are still missing.

The same year after the disaster, the shipping company filed for bankruptcy in June, and was officially dissolved in May 2016.

== Company ==
Chonghaejin Marine Company Ltd. was set up on 24 February 1999, and became a key entity to consolidate Yoo Byung-eun's bankrupt company Semo's shipping business, taking over ships and assets held by Semo Marine, and had Semo's debts written off. Yoo Byung-eun's two sons are controlling the shipping firm through a majority stake in the investment vehicle I-One-I Holdings as well as 13 unlisted affiliates which through a tangled web of ownership structure own each other. After Sewol's sinking, the Ministry of Oceans and Fisheries cancelled Chonghaejin Marine's license to operate ferries on the Incheon-Jeju Island route in May 2014.

In mid June 2014, Chonhaiji Co. Ltd., a ship block maker controlled by the sons of businessman Yoo Byung-eun, and the major shareholder of Chonghaejin Marine Company with 39.4%, lodged its application for receivership at the Changwon District Court. Chonhaiji had ₩34.8 billion (~US$34.19 million) in outstanding debt to main creditor Korea Development Bank. On 12 June 2014 a man's body was found in a field 415 kilometres south of Seoul. A few weeks later after forensic testing police revealed it was the body of Yoo Byung-eun. While foul play was ruled out, police said they had yet to establish the cause of death.

== History ==
Chonghaejin Marine Company Ltd. was established on 24 February 1999, is a South Korea shipping company known for its involvement in passenger and freight transportation. The company's operations began with a focus on domestic ferry services, primarily connecting the mainland to various islands along the coast of South Korea.

Over the years, Chonghaejin expanded its fleet and services, becoming a significant player in the ferry industry. The company operated several vessels, including large ferries capable of carrying passengers and vehicles, catering to both tourists and local commuters.

One of the most notable events in the company's history was the tragic sinking of the MV Sewol on April 16, 2014. The disaster resulted in the loss of 304 lives and raised significant concerns about maritime safety practices in South Korea. Following the incident, Chonghaejin Marine faced intense scrutiny and criticism regarding its operations, safety protocols, and the handling of the tragedy. The company was subsequently involved in legal battles and underwent structural changes to address the shortcomings exposed by the incident. Chonghaejin Marine was officially dissolved on 9 May 2016.

== Ferries ==
Chonghaejin Marine Company's Most notable ferry was MV Sewol, which sank on April 16, 2014 with the loss of 304 lives, among them being 250 high school students on a field trip. Some other Ferries include Chonghaejin Express Ferry No. 1, which accidentally collided with an oil tanker in 2003, and Ohamana, which was retired after the sinking of her sister ship, Sewol.
