= List of awareness ribbons =

Ribbon colors worn to signal issue awareness

This is an incomplete list of awareness ribbons. The meaning behind an awareness ribbon depends on its colors and pattern. Since many advocacy groups have adopted ribbons as symbols of support or awareness, ribbons, particularly those of a single color, some colors may refer to more than one cause. Some causes may be represented by more than one ribbon.

== Colors and meanings ==
| Ribbon | Color | First use | Author | Meanings |
|---|---|---|---|---|
| pink ribbon | Pink ribbon | October 1992 | Alexandra Penney for Self and Evelyn Lauder | Breast cancer awareness |
| Red ribbon | Red ribbon | ? | | Heart disease |
| Red ribbon | Red ribbon | 1985 | Duncan Hunter and Henry Lozano's Camanera Clubs | Substance-abuse awareness including tobacco, alcohol and drugs (Red Ribbon Week is commonly held in American schools.) |
| Red ribbon | Red ribbon | June 1991 | Visual AIDS Artists' Caucus (anonymous) | HIV/AIDS awareness |
| Red ribbon | Red ribbon | ? | | Stroke |
| Maroon ribbon | Maroon ribbon | ? | International Myeloma Foundation | Multiple myeloma awareness |
| Orange ribbon | Orange ribbon | ? | | Chronic Obstructive Pulmonary Disease (COPD) |
| Orange ribbon | Orange ribbon | ? | | Amplified musculoskeletal pain syndrome, a chronic pain condition consisting of four different disorders, including complex regional pain syndrome (CRPS). - the newer multicolored orange/red flame is also used |
| Orange ribbon | Orange ribbon | ? | | Cultural diversity |
| Orange ribbon | Orange ribbon | ? | | Kidney cancer – alternative to the green ribbon |
| Orange ribbon | Orange ribbon | ? | | Gun violence protests, including after the Parkland shootings |
| Orange ribbon | Orange ribbon | ? | Leukemia & Lymphoma Society | Leukemia awareness |
| Orange ribbon | Orange ribbon | ? | | Malnutrition/hunger |
| Orange ribbon | Orange ribbon | ? | Multiple Sclerosis International Federation | Multiple sclerosis awareness |
| Orange ribbon | Orange ribbon | ? | | Self-injury awareness/self-harm awareness |
| Orange ribbon | Orange ribbon | ? | | Work Zone Safety Awareness |
| Orange ribbon | Orange ribbon | 2004 | Viktor Yushchenko 2004 presidential campaign | Support for the Orange Revolution |
| Yellow ribbon | Yellow ribbon | ? | | Traditional (in the U.S. and in Canada) symbol of support for military forces, especially those deployed overseas and in conflicts, including prisoners of war and those missing in action. This use spread to other countries like the United Kingdom, Germany, and Sweden. |
| Yellow ribbon | Yellow ribbon | 1994 | International Association for Suicide Prevention, Yellow Ribbon Suicide Prevention Program | See also: Suicide awareness Suicide prevention |
| Yellow ribbon | Yellow ribbon | ? | | Endometriosis awareness |
| Yellow ribbon | Yellow ribbon | 2012–2014 | Rural Fire Brigades Association Queensland | Rural Fire Service Queensland – A symbol of unilateral support of Rural Fire Brigades across the state of Queensland, Australia |
| Yellow ribbon | Yellow ribbon | 2014 | Yellow Ribbon Campaign and Sewol Ferry Protest Movement | Sinking of South Korean ferry MV Sewol in 2014 which resulted in more than 300 deaths. |
| Yellow ribbon | Yellow ribbon | 2014 | | Supporters of 2014 Hong Kong protests |
| Yellow ribbon | Yellow ribbon | 2018 | | Protest against imprisonment of Catalan independence movement leaders during the Catalan crisis |
| Yellow ribbon | Yellow ribbon | 2022 | Yellow Ribbon | Resistance movement in the Russian-occupied territories of Ukraine, created in April 2022 after the Russian military invasion. The goal of the movement is informational resistance to the Russian occupiers |
| Yellow ribbon | Yellow ribbon | 2023 | Bring Them Home Now | Advocating safe return of the hostages taken by Hamas in its attack on Israel on October 7, 2023. |
| Bright green awareness ribbon | Bright green ribbon | ? | | Climate change/global warming |
| Lime Ribbon | Lime green ribbon | | | Lyme disease, Post-Treatment Lyme Disease |
| Lime Ribbon | Lime green ribbon | ? | | Non-Hodgkin lymphoma awareness |
| Green ribbon | Green ribbon | ? | | Bipolar disorder (manic depression) |
| Green ribbon | Green ribbon | ? | | Cerebral palsy |
| Green ribbon | Green ribbon | ? | | Depression |
| Green ribbon | Green ribbon | ? | | Kidney cancer – alternative to the orange ribbon, kidney disease |
| Green ribbon | Green ribbon | ? | | Mitochondrial disease awareness |
| Green ribbon | Green ribbon | ? | | Mental health awareness and mental illness awareness |
| Green ribbon | Green ribbon | 2022 | | Anti-war movement in Russia protesting against the 2022 invasion of Ukraine |
| Jade ribbon | Jade ribbon | 2001 | | Jade Ribbon Campaign awareness about hepatitis B and liver cancer |
| Teal ribbon | Teal ribbon | ? | | Cervical cancer an alternative is the Teal and White ribbon |
| Teal ribbon | Teal ribbon | 2001 | Sexual Assault Awareness Month (SAAM) | Sexual assault/sexual abuse including Military Sexual Trauma |
| Teal ribbon | Teal ribbon | ? | | Food allergies |
| Teal ribbon | Teal ribbon | ? | | Ovarian cancer |
| Teal ribbon | Teal ribbon | ? | | Polycystic Ovarian Syndrome (PCOS) |
| Teal ribbon | Teal ribbon | ? | | Post-traumatic Stress Disorder |
| Teal ribbon | Teal ribbon | 2014 | | Trigeminal neuralgia |
| Teal ribbon | Teal ribbon | ? | | Obsessive Compulsive Disorder (OCD) |
| Teal ribbon | Teal ribbon | ? | | Tsunami victims |
| Teal ribbon | Teal ribbon | ? | | Uterine cancer |
| Turquoise ribbon | Turquoise ribbon | ? | | Addiction recovery – alternative to red for substance use |
| Turquoise ribbon | Turquoise ribbon | ? | | Congenital diaphragmatic hernia (CDH) |
| Turquoise ribbon | Turquoise ribbon | ? | | Dysautonomia |
| Turquoise ribbon | Turquoise ribbon | ? | | Native American and Native American reparations |
| Light blue ribbon | Light blue ribbon | ? | | Childhood cancer |
| Light blue ribbon | Light blue ribbon | ? | | Men's health |
| Light blue ribbon | Light blue ribbon | | | Prostate cancer |
| Blue ribbon | Blue ribbon | ? | | Acute Respiratory Distress Syndrome (ARDS) |
| Blue ribbon | Blue ribbon | ? | | Autism spectrum although the autism infinity symbol is often used |
| Blue ribbon | Blue ribbon | ? | | Hydrocephalus |
| Blue ribbon | Blue ribbon | ? | | Mourning and honoring a police officer killed in the line of duty. |
| Blue ribbon | Blue ribbon | 1993 | Tom Hennessy | Myalgic Encephalomyelitis/Chronic Fatigue Syndrome (ME/CFS) |
| Blue ribbon | Blue ribbon | 1996 | Electronic Freedom Foundation's Blue Ribbon Online Free Speech Campaign | Support of freedom of speech, press, freedom of association online, and protesting against Internet censorship |
| Blue ribbon | Blue ribbon | ? | | Parkinson's disease awareness |
| Blue ribbon | Blue ribbon | ? | | Canada's National Non-Smoking Week |
| Blue ribbon | Blue ribbon | ? | | "Stand With ACLU" initiative |
| Blue ribbon | Blue ribbon | 2014 | | Supporters of government officials and police during the 2014 Hong Kong protests. |
| Dark blue ribbon | Dark blue ribbon | | | Arthritis |
| Dark blue ribbon | Dark blue ribbon | ? | | Child abuse prevention |
| Dark blue ribbon | Dark blue ribbon | ? | | Colon/Colorectal cancer awareness |
| Purple ribbon | Purple ribbon | ? | | Alzheimer's awareness |
| Purple ribbon | Purple ribbon | ? | | Domestic violence/intimate relationship violence |
| Purple ribbon | Purple ribbon | ? | | Fibromyalgia |
| Purple ribbon | Purple ribbon | ? | | Opioid crisis awareness – Notably worn by various Senators during President Donald Trump's 2018 State of the Union address. |
| Purple ribbon | Purple ribbon | ? | | Month of the Military Child, Celebrating Military Kids |
| Purple ribbon | Purple ribbon | ? | | Spirit Day and victims of homophobia |
| Purple ribbon | Purple ribbon | ? | | Epilepsy awareness |
| Purple ribbon | Purple ribbon | ? | | Lupus Awareness Month (May) |
| Purple ribbon | Purple ribbon | ? | | Pancreatic cancer |
| Purple ribbon | Purple ribbon | ? | | Thyroid cancer |
| Purple ribbon | Purple ribbon | ? | | Leiomyosarcoma |
| Purple ribbon | Purple ribbon | ? | | Inflammatory bowel disease including Crohn's disease and Ulcerative Colitis |
| Periwinkle (light purplish) ribbon) | Periwinkle ribbon | ? | | Eating disorders |
| Periwinkle (light purplish) ribbon) | Periwinkle ribbon | ? | | Esophageal cancer |
| Periwinkle (light purplish) ribbon) | Periwinkle ribbon | ? | | Pulmonary hypertension |
| Lavender ribbon | Lavender ribbon | ? | | Craniosynostosis |
| Lavender ribbon | Lavender ribbon | ? | | Epilepsy |
| Lavender ribbon | Lavender ribbon | ? | | General cancer awareness |
| Lavender ribbon | Lavender ribbon | ? | | Rett Syndrome |
| Silver ribbon | Silver ribbon | ? | | Parkinson's Disease |
| Silver ribbon | Silver ribbon | 1993 | Jean Singleton | Schizophrenia, brain illness and brain disorders |
| Gray ribbon | Gray ribbon | ? | | Asthma |
| Gray ribbon | Gray ribbon | ? | | Brain Tumor Awareness Month/Brain Cancer Awareness |
| Gray ribbon | Gray ribbon | ? | | Borderline personality disorder |
| Gray ribbon | Gray ribbon | ? | | Diabetes Awareness Month |
| White ribbon | White ribbon | ? | | Bone cancer |
| White ribbon | White ribbon | ? | | Lung disease including cancer |
| White ribbon | White ribbon | ? | | Peace |
| White ribbon | White ribbon | 1991 | White Ribbon Campaign, of men and boys working to end male violence against women and girls | Violence against women |
| Black ribbon | Black ribbon | ? | | Typically a sign of mourning, or otherwise in memoriam |
| Black ribbon | Black ribbon | ? | | Melanoma (skin cancer) |
| Black ribbon | Black ribbon | ? | | Awareness of the POW/MIA issue in the US |
| Black ribbon | Black ribbon | ? | | Black Ribbon Initiative awareness and public outreach program of Madhya Pradesh Police (India) to make all sections of society computer security aware and alert |
| Black ribbon | Black ribbon | ? | | Anti-violence campaign in New Zealand |
| Black ribbon | Black ribbon | ? | | Gang prevention |
| Black ribbon | Black ribbon | 2015 | | Black Ribbon Movement of medical professions and medical students against the appointment of military officers to positions within Ministry of Health in Myanmar (Burma) in August 2015 |
| Zebra-print ribbon | Zebra print ribbon | ? | | Carcinoid cancer |
| Zebra-print ribbon | Zebra print ribbon | ? | | Neuroendocrine tumors (NET) |
| Zebra-print ribbon | Zebra print ribbon | ? | | Ehlers-Danlos Syndromes (EDS) |
| Zebra-print ribbon | Zebra print ribbon | 2008 | EURODIS | Rare diseases, especially on Rare Disease Day |
| | Houndstooth ribbon | 2011 | | Relief efforts in Tuscaloosa and northern Alabama following 27 April 2011 tornado (The pattern evokes former University of Alabama head football coach Bear Bryant, an icon of the city and its area.) |
| Ribbon of Saint George | Orange and black ribbon | 1769, 1945 (as a military symbol); 2005 (as an awareness ribbon) | Government of Russia | Ribbon of Saint George; commemoration of World War II in Russia and Russian-occupied territories |
| Ribbon of Saint George | Orange and black ribbon | 2005 | Government of Russia | Support for Vladimir Putin, Russian nationalism, and/or far-right politics in Russia |
| Pink and blue ribbon | Pink and blue ribbon | ? | | Infant and pre-natal death or premature birth |
| Two tone blue ribbon with water droplet and text on it reading "hydrocephalus awareness" | Hydrocephalus two tone blue ribbon | ? | | Hydrocephalus |
| Blue denim ribbon | Blue denim ribbon | 1992 | Chronic Granulomatous Disorder Society in the UK | Hereditary/genetic diseases – Jeans for Genes campaign |
| Red white and blue ribbon | Red, white and blue ribbon | 2011 | | Used in Omaha, Nebraska, after a deadly shooting at Millard South High School (Matches to the school's colors) |
| Cyan ribbon | Awareness ribbon for Parkinson's UK | ? | | Parkinson's |

== See also ==
- Awareness campaign
- Political colour
