= Yellow ribbon =

Symbol of various causes

A yellow ribbon has various uses. It can be applied as a necktie, worn on a person, mounted on a car, or wrapped around a tree. In the United States, it has many different associations, most commonly forgiveness and hope.

== United States ==
=== Different uses ===
The yellow ribbon is a symbol for hope.

In the United States displaying a yellow ribbon is a show of support for the safe return of American troops, including the missed in action (MIA) and prisoners of war (POW).

Suicide prevention campaigns and suicide survivors themselves also use the yellow ribbon.

It is also used by or for adoptive parents, and in cases of Amber alert (child abduction emergency alert).

=== History and etymology ===
==== "She Wore a Yellow Ribbon" ====
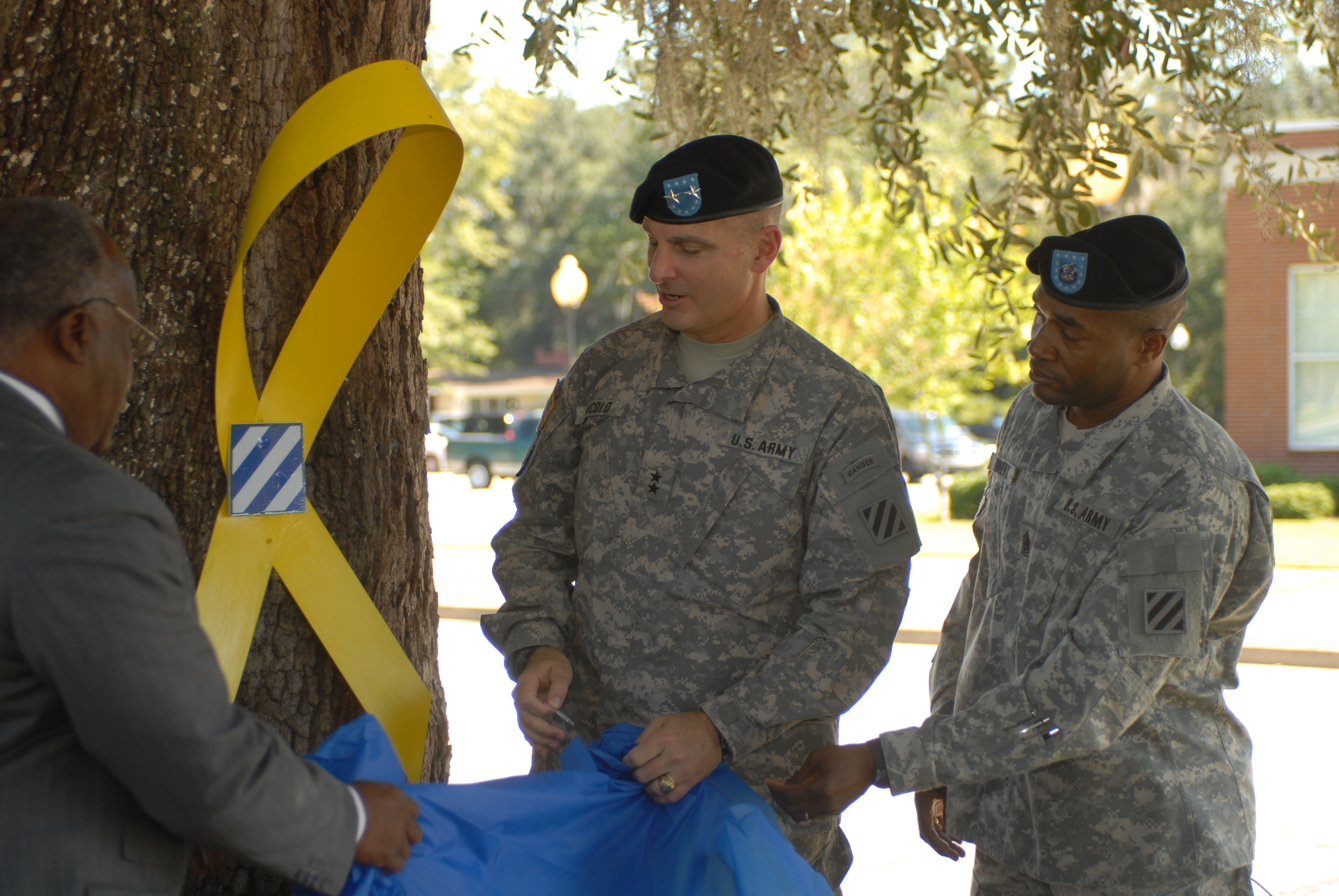
Yellow Ribbon rededication ceremony to commemorate the 3rd Infantry Division's fourth deployment since September 11, 2001, at Victory Park in Hinesville.

Yellow is the official color of the armor branch of the U.S. Army, used in insignia, etc., and depicted in Hollywood movies by the yellow neckerchief adorning latter-half 19th century, horse-mounted U.S. Cavalry soldiers. However, a review of the U.S. War Department's Regulations for the Uniform and Dress of the Army of the United States (1872, 1898) reveals that a neckerchief, of any color, was not an item required by dress code. Despite this, neckerchiefs were a popular accessory employed by cavalrymen to cope with the frequently dusty environs. The specific association of the yellow neckerchief with the U.S. Cavalry may have arisen from a work of popular American West artist Frederic Remington—Lieutenant Powhatan H. Clarke, Tenth Cavalry (1888).

In the United States military, the symbol of the yellow ribbon is used in a popular marching song. The first version copyrighted was the 1917 version by George A. Norton, which he titled "Round Her Neck She Wears a Yeller Ribbon (For Her Lover Who Is Far, Far Away)". While he tells in the song about the love between Susie Simpkins and her soldier lover Silas Hubbard, his chorus goes:

'Round her neck she wears a yeller ribbon,
She wears it in winter and the summer so they say,
If you ask her "Why the decoration?"
She'll say "It's for my lover who is far, far away."

The lyrics were altered and the song was titled She Wore a Yellow Ribbon by Russ Morgan for the 1949 movie of the same name. This was performed by several popular musicians of the 1940s, including Mitch Miller and the Andrews Sisters. The Tanner Sisters recorded their version in London on December 30, 1949. It was released by His Master's Voice as catalog number B 9873.

The text of the Army version approximates the following, with local variations:

Around her hair she wore a yellow ribbon
She wore it in the springtime
In the merry month of May
And if you ask her why the heck she wore it
She wore it for her soldier who was far far away

Far away, far away
She wore it for her soldier
Who was far, far away

Around the block she pushed a baby carriage
She pushed it in the springtime
In the Merry month of May
And if you ask her why the heck she pushed it
She pushed it for her soldier who was far far away

Far away, far away
She pushed it for her soldier
Who was far, far away

Behind the door her daddy kept a shotgun
He kept it in the springtime
In the merry month of May
And if you ask him why the heck he kept it
He kept it for her soldier who was far far away

Far away, far away
He kept it for her soldier
Who was far, far away

On the grave she laid the pretty flowers
She laid them in the springtime
In the merry month of May
And if you asked her why the heck she laid them
She laid them for her soldier who was far far away

Far away, far away
She laid them for her soldier
Who was far, far away

==== Forgiveness ====
In a 1991 speech, former Church of Jesus Christ of Latter-day Saints president Thomas S. Monson quoted a story relayed by prison warden Kenyon J. Scudder in a 1961 Reader's Digest article. The story described a man whose family used a white ribbon as a sign of forgiveness. Monson then connected the story to the tradition of the yellow ribbon's use as a symbol of home-welcoming and forgiveness.

"A friend of his happened to be sitting in a railroad coach next to a young man who was obviously depressed. Finally, the young man revealed that he was a paroled convict returning from a distant prison. His imprisonment had brought shame to his family, and they had neither visited him nor written often. He hoped, however, that this was only because they were too poor to travel and too uneducated to write. He hoped, despite the evidence, that they had forgiven him.

"To make it easy for them, however, he had written to them asking that they put up a signal for him when the train passed their little farm on the outskirts of town. If his family had forgiven him, they were to put up a white ribbon in the big apple tree which stood near the tracks. If they didn't want him to return, they were to do nothing, and he would remain on the train as it traveled onward.

"As the train neared his hometown, the suspense became so great that he couldn’t bear to look out of his window. He exclaimed, 'In just five minutes the engineer will sound the whistle indicating our approach to the long bend which opens into the valley I know as home. Will you watch for the apple tree at the side of the track?' His companion said he would; they exchanged places. The minutes seemed like hours, but then there came the shrill sound of the train whistle. The young man asked, 'Can you see the tree? Is there a white ribbon?'

"Came the reply, 'I see the tree. I see not one white ribbon, but many. There is a white ribbon on every branch. Son, someone surely does love you.'"

==== "Tie a Yellow Ribbon Round the Ole Oak Tree" ====
The symbol became widely known in civilian life in the 1970s. It was the central theme of the popular song "Tie a Yellow Ribbon Round the Ole Oak Tree", Written by Irwin Levine and L. Russell Brown and recorded by Tony Orlando and Dawn (among many others), as the sign a released prisoner requested from his wife or lover to indicate that she would welcome him home. He would be able to see it from the bus driving by their house and would stay on the bus in the absence of the ribbon.

From the Library of Congress:

In October 1971, newspaper columnist Pete Hamill wrote a piece for the New York Post called "Going Home". In it, college students on a bus trip to the beaches of Fort Lauderdale make friends with an ex-convict who is watching for a yellow handkerchief on a roadside oak. Hamill claimed to have heard this story in oral tradition.

In June 1972, nine months later, Reader's Digest reprinted "Going Home". Also in June 1972, ABC-TV aired a dramatized version of it in which James Earl Jones played the role of the returning ex-con. A month-and-a-half after that, Irwin Levine and L. Russell Brown registered for copyright a song they called "Tie a Yellow Ribbon Round the Old Oak Tree." The authors said they heard the story while serving in the military. Pete Hamill was not convinced and filed suit for infringement.

One factor that may have influenced Hamill's decision to do so was that in May 1973, "Tie A Yellow Ribbon" sold 3 million records in three weeks. When the dust settled, BMI calculated that radio stations had played it 3 million times, or 17 continuous years of airplay. Hamill dropped his suit after folklorists working for Levine and Brown turned up archival versions of the story that had been collected before "Going Home" had been written.

==== Iran hostage crisis (1979-1981) ====
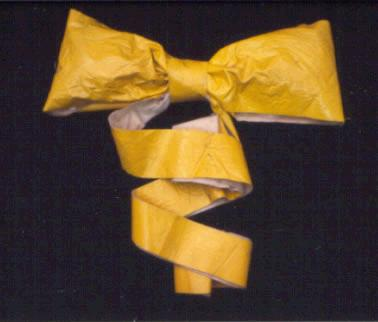
Yellow ribbon flown in 1979 by Penelope Laingen when her husband, US diplomat Bruce was held captive during the Iran hostage crisis, among the first of the modern "yellow ribbons."

During the Iran hostage crisis, the yellow ribbon was used as a symbol of support for the hostages held at the United States embassy in Tehran. In November 1979, a committee headed by Suzan E. Garrett of the Jaycees ladies service organization in Leitchfield, Kentucky organized a campaign to "Tie A Yellow Ribbon" around public trees as well as encouraging people to wear tied ribbons on lapels in support of the U.S. hostages being held in Iran. She was interviewed on ABC-TV by Ted Koppel on the newly created Nightline late-night news program and later by Peter Jennings for ABC's World News Tonight.

This symbolism continued and gained further recognition in December 1979, when Penelope Laingen, wife of Bruce Laingen, who was the most senior foreign service officer being held hostage, tied a yellow ribbon around a tree on the lawn of her Maryland home. The ribbon primarily symbolized the resolve of the American people to win the hostages' safe release. Yellow ribbons featured prominently in the celebrations of their return home in January 1981.

==== Troop support during and after deployment ====
The yellow ribbon saw renewed popularity in the United States during the Gulf War in the early 1990s. It appeared along with the slogan "support our troops", in the form of yellow ribbons tied to trees, and countless other contexts. It often had the implied meaning of "bring our troops home" from the Desert Shield and Desert Storm troop deployments. It appeared again during the 2003 invasion of Iraq with similar meanings, most prominently in the form of a yellow ribbon printed on magnetized material and displayed on the outside of automobiles.

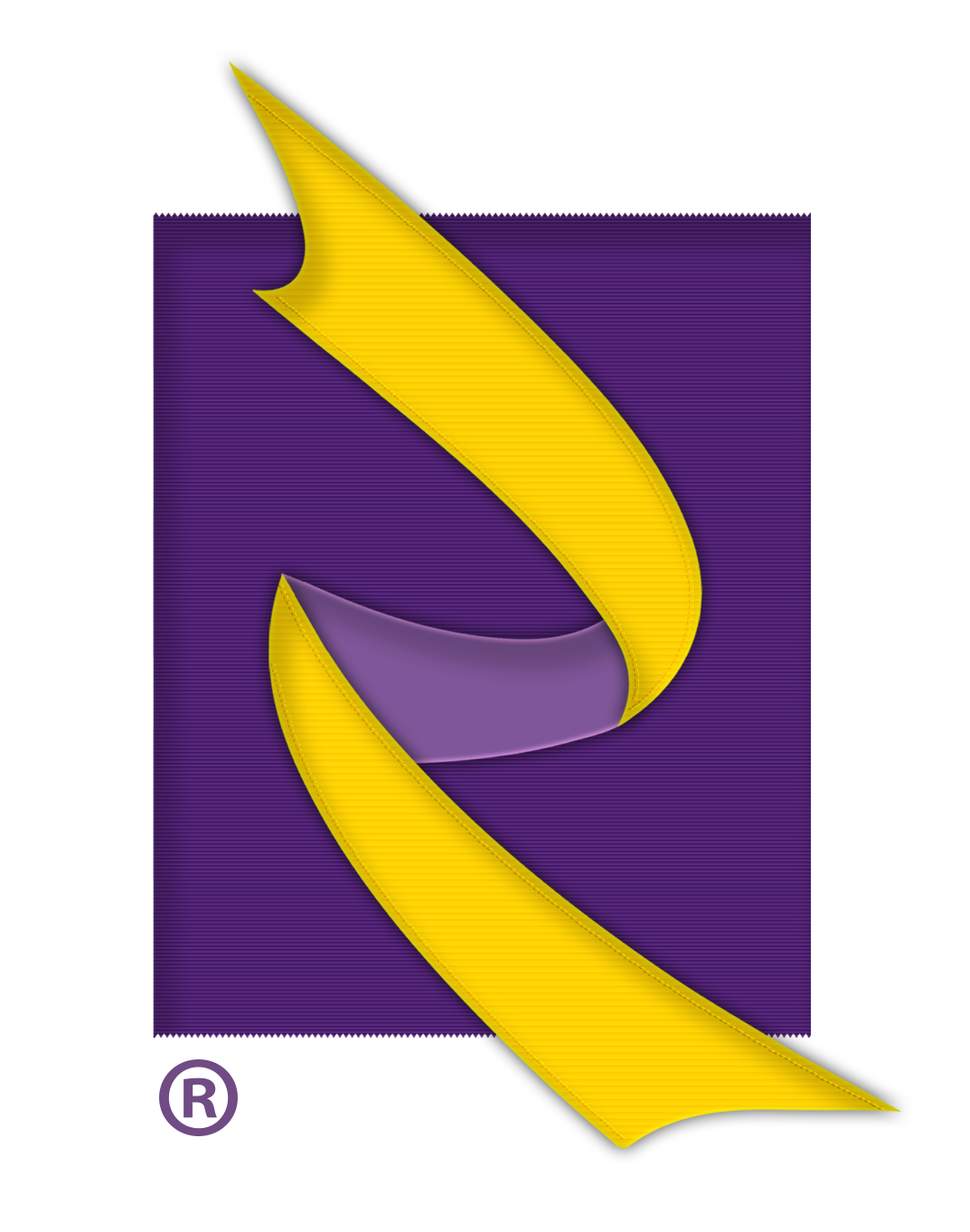
Trademarked logo for the Department of Defense's Yellow Ribbon Reintegration Program.

The Yellow Ribbon Reintegration Program (YRRP) uses the yellow ribbon in its logo. YRRP is a Department of Defense-wide effort to promote the well-being of National Guard and Reserve members, their families, and communities, by connecting them with resources throughout the deployment cycle. An American charity named the Yellow Ribbon Foundation was founded in 2001 to support military veterans.

The yellow ribbon is also the scholastic symbol adopted by universities and institutions that provide student veteran support through the "Yellow Ribbon Program" and represents a matched financial contribution between that establishment and the U.S. government to cover tuition costs that the normal Post Montgomery or Post 9/11 GI Bill would not normally cover.

=== Health issues ===
Bladder cancer and sarcoma

Yellow ribbons are the emblem used for bladder cancer and sarcoma awareness.

==== Endometriosis ====
The yellow ribbon is the emblem for endometriosis awareness, especially during March for endometriosis awareness month. Yellow ribbons are worn by endometriosis patients and supporters, and is a common color for fundraising products. This was established by the Endometriosis Foundation of America in the 1980s, using the color yellow for its awareness brochure.

==== Microcephaly ====
The color associated with microcephaly awareness is yellow, as well. Microcephaly is a physical finding consistent with the incomplete development of the head—and often the brain—at birth or soon thereafter. Microcephaly Awareness Day is on September 30.

==== Spina bifida ====
It also shows support for people with spina bifida.

=== Dog bite prevention ===
In May 2014, the American Veterinary Medical Association released a series of videos about preventing dog bites. One of the videos explained the practice of tying a yellow ribbon to a dog's leash to indicate the dog did not like strangers.

This practice is associated with The Yellow Dog Project, a global movement founded in 2013 by Canadian dog trainer Tara Palardy to raise awareness that some dogs need space for reasons including fear, anxiety, health conditions, or ongoing training. A yellow ribbon on a dog’s leash or collar signals that the dog should not be approached or petted without the owner‘s permission.

== Original AIDS awareness ribbon ==
The yellow ribbon was the original symbol for AIDS awareness, before the red ribbon became used for HIV/AIDS from 1991 onwards.

== Suicide prevention ==
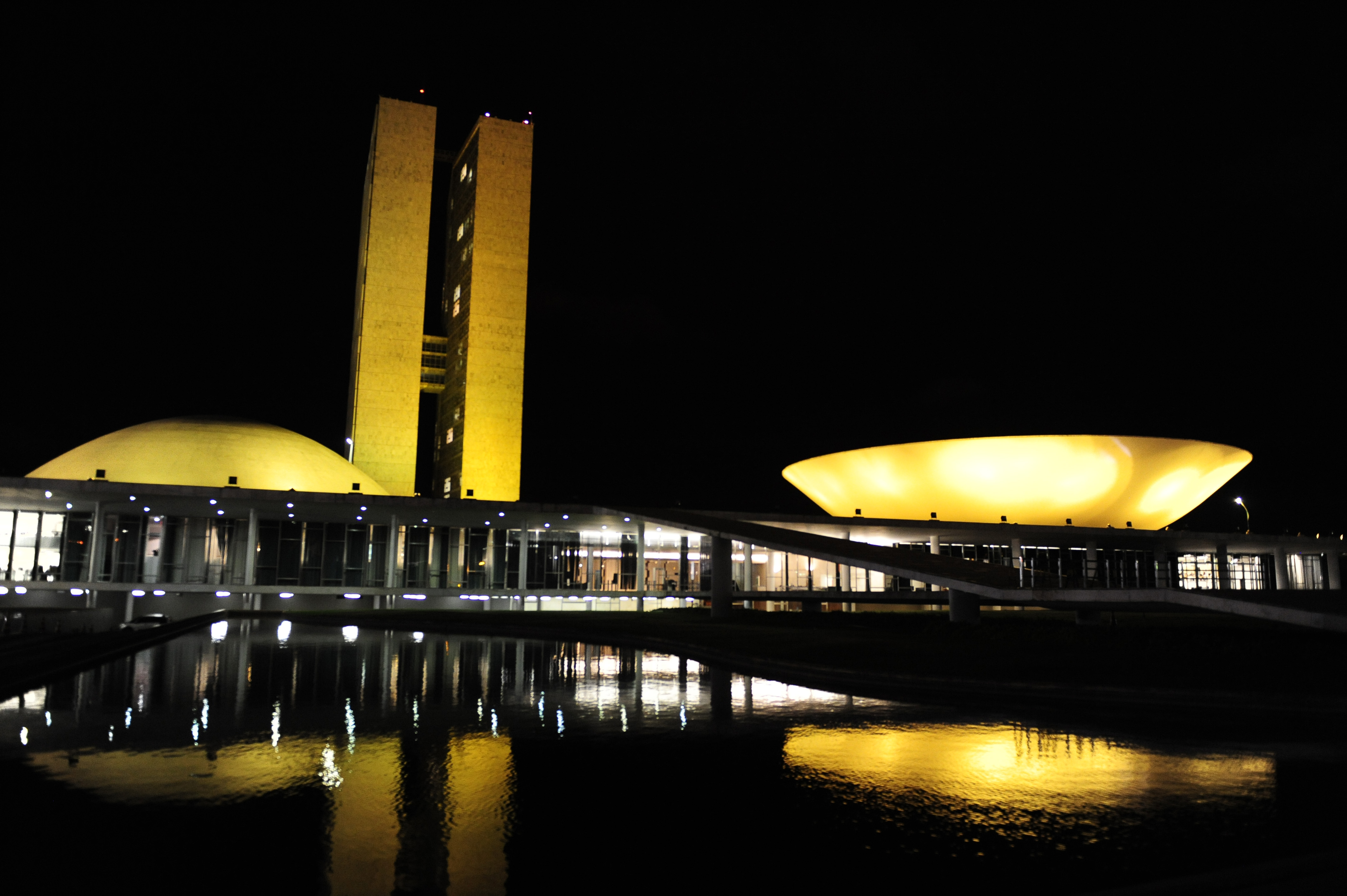
The National Congress of Brazil building lit up in yellow lights, demonstrating solidarity with the suicide prevention movement.

The yellow ribbon is an international emblem for suicide prevention awareness, particularly for young people, and is used for suicide prevention awareness in many countries including the United States, Australia, New Zealand, Canada, the United Kingdom and Ireland.

In Brazil, "Yellow September" is a movement to raise awareness about the problem of suicide in the country - for more see under Brazil.

In the United States, the Yellow Ribbon Suicide Prevention Program is a community-based program primarily developed to address youth/teen/young adult suicides (ages 10–25) through public awareness campaigns, education and training and by helping communities build capacity. The program began in September 1994 after the suicide of 17-year-old Mike Emme.

== Usage in various countries ==
=== Australia ===
In Australia, the Save Albert Park group has utilized the yellow ribbon as a symbol of protest. The group is a coalition protesting the reclamation of public space in Albert Park, Melbourne for the annual Australian Grand Prix. When the race moved to Melbourne in 1996, yellow ribbons were tied around the trees in the park which were designated for removal. Although the group was unsuccessful in protecting the designated trees, they and their supporters still tie ribbons around the trees each year at the time of the race.

In 2009, the yellow ribbon was used during the appeal for those affected by the 2009 Victorian bushfires.

The yellow ribbon is also used for the Australian National Road Safety Week.

=== Brazil ===
In Brazil, "Yellow September" is a movement to raise awareness about the problem of suicide in the country.

=== Canada ===
A yellow ribbon, for any symbolic purpose, was uncommon in Canada until the Great War when it was used by mothers and wives of soldiers who were fighting. The ribbon represented a commitment, belief, and hope in the Canadian soldiers.

World War II created a more powerful nationalism and national pride when Canada entered the war. The yellow ribbon began to represent the close ties and strong relationship it had with France and Great Britain, forgiving the countries of all past wrongs and fighting for their brothers and sisters. As the war progressed and an allied defeat seemed imminent, the ribbon represented the close ties the soldiers had back home and for their country, Canada.

Operation Yellow Ribbon was the Canadian government's operation to land hundreds of United States flights in response to the September 11 attacks. Operation Yellow Ribbon represented Canada's connection and ties to America and Canada's commitment to give the American people who were stranded food, healthcare, and shelter until all was safe and they could go home.

=== China ===
China uses the yellow ribbon as a reminder of the 2015 Sinking of Dong Fang Zhi Xing.

=== Cuba ===
Cuba utilized the yellow ribbon to spread awareness of, and show ones support for freeing the Cuban Five imprisoned in the United States. On 12 September 2013, the fifteen year anniversary of the arrest of the Cuban Five, Cubans marked the day with a massive display of yellow ribbons. The symbol of the yellow ribbon to welcome loved ones home is an image Cubans hoped would resonate with the American people.

=== Denmark, Sweden and Norway ===
In Denmark, the yellow ribbon has become the more or less official (though not directly officially endorsed by the countries' armed forces) symbol for support of troops in missions. In Sweden, Swedish Veteran Federation and Stiftelsen Jesper Lindbloms Minne is promoting it as a troop-supporting symbol, for both military and non-military personnel on peacekeeping missions. In Sweden the yellow ribbon is also associated with testicular cancer awareness, maybe more so than a symbol for support of troops in missions.

=== Estonia ===
In Estonia the yellow ribbon was taken into use on 13 May 2011 after the President of Estonia, Toomas Hendrik Ilves made the following announcement on Facebook: "The families of the seven Estonian citizens taken hostage in Lebanon need all of our support. Not intrusive nosiness but rather quiet and committed support that says: your concern is our concern, we hope and believe together with you. Today, to show this, I put a yellow ribbon on my lapel." The seven Estonian citizens referred to by the President, were taken hostage on 23 March 2011 in eastern Lebanon during a cycling trip. On 14 July 2011 it was announced that the hostages had been freed. The yellow ribbon was worn in person, but also virtually on Facebook. For that, a specialised Facebook App was created for people to automatically be able to add a yellow ribbon to their profile pictures. As of 14 July 2011, 12,671 people had added the yellow ribbon to their profile picture.

=== Germany ===
In Germany, the yellow ribbon symbolizes solidarity with the armed forces.

=== Hong Kong ===
The yellow ribbon is used as a symbol for Hong Kong's pro-democracy movement and their demands for universal suffrage, as it has long been the official colour of many suffrage organisations, stemming from the women's suffrage campaign in the US in the 1860. The yellow ribbon was first used by pro-democracy camp legislators in a press conference after the December 2005 protest for democracy in Hong Kong, and was later adopted as a symbol among protestors during the 2014 Hong Kong protests.

The yellow ribbon is used in many ways, in particular on social media, for demonstrating solidarity with the pro-democracy protestors, and it became more widely used after Hong Kong police fired tear gas and used pepper spray (capsaicin) to dissipate the students and protesters who were occupying Harcourt Road in Admiralty on 28 September 2014, in the 2014 Hong Kong protests. The meaning of yellow ribbon in Hong Kong has also extended to symbolise discountenance of the abuse of violence by the Hong Kong Police against pro-democracy protestors in the 2014 protests.

In 2019–2020 Hong Kong protests, yellow ribbon is symbolised as supporting pro-democracy protestors again, which is opposed to blue ribbon, and derives "Yellow economic circle".

=== Indonesia ===
In Indonesia, yellow ribbon is used as a symbol to show solidarity and sympathy for the victims of the riots and chaos in Indonesia May 13–15, 1998, who were mostly Indonesian Chinese.

=== Israel ===
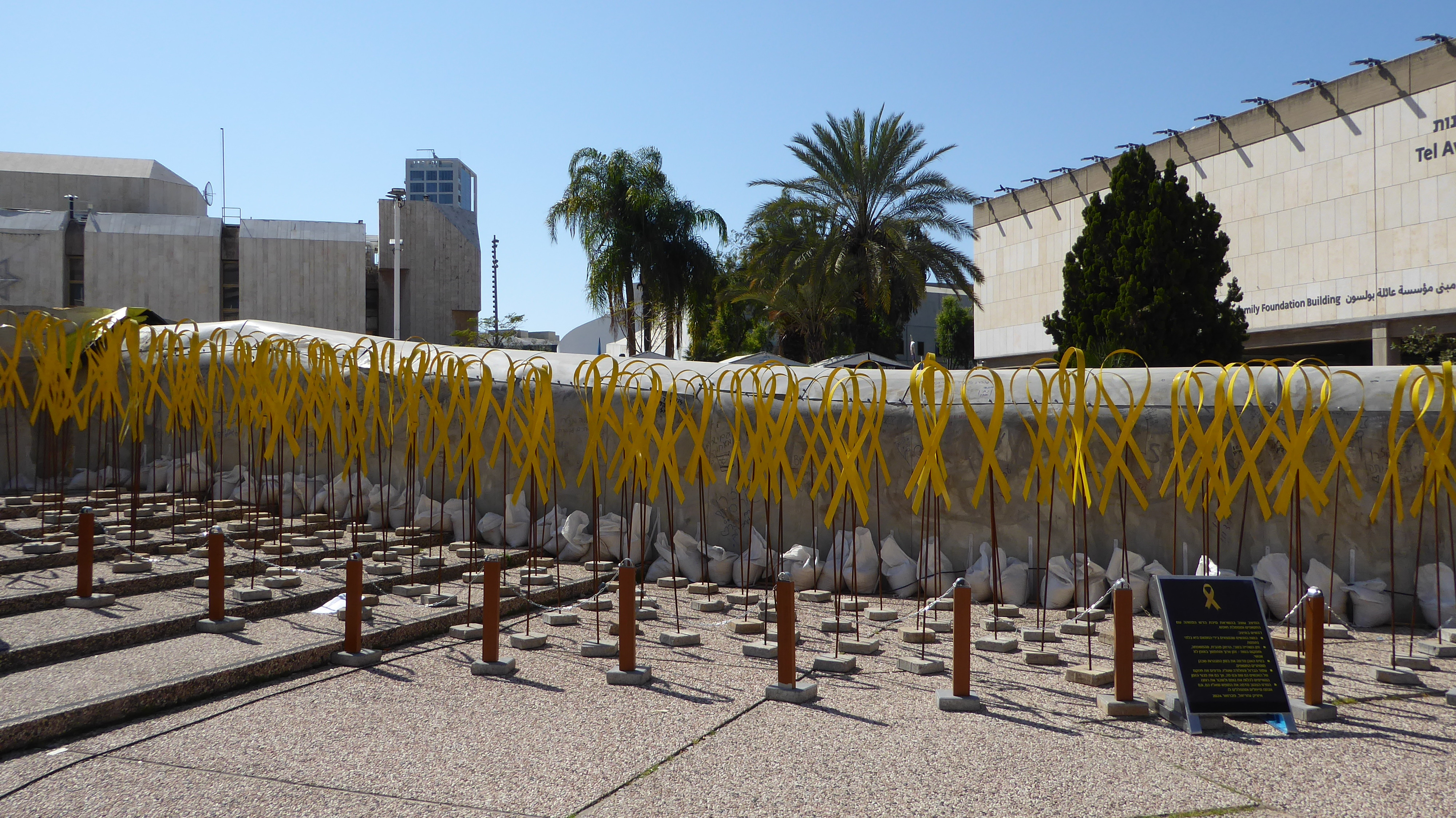
Yellow ribbons in Hostages Square, Tel Aviv, March 2024

Starting in August 2008, in the northern Israeli region of Galilee, yellow ribbons were tied to the left side mirrors of civilian cars as a symbol of the hope of the Israelis to free Israeli soldier Gilad Shalit who was held captive for five years in the Gaza Strip by Hamas.

After the October 7th massacre by Hamas, families of hostages taken into Gaza launched a project of handing out yellow ribbons on the streets of Israel. Later on, supporters outside of Israel adopted the symbol in order to call for the release of the hostages.

The Hostages and Missing Families Forum introduced the yellow ribbon in 2023 as a symbol to call for the release of hostages taken by Hamas after the October 7 attacks (the last of whom were released in 2026), occasionally appearing alongside the slogan "Bring Them Home Now". Later in 2024, the yellow ribbon had gained recognition as a symbol calling for the hostages' release.

=== Italy ===
In Italy, the yellow ribbon is worn to support the prisoners of war (POWs). It has been used to support the two Italian marines during the diplomatic crisis between Italy and India (see 2012 Enrica Lexie case).

=== Japan ===
Japan's Medal of Honor with Yellow Ribbon, revived since 1955, is an acknowledgement handed out to professionals who have become public role models.

=== Kuwait ===
In Kuwait the yellow ribbon is worn to support the prisoners of war (POWs) missing from Kuwait, during the period from the Iraqi invasion in 1990 until the fall of Baghdad on April 9, 2003. The fall of Baghdad marked the end of the era of Saddam Hussein; afterwards, some Kuwaiti graves were found. On the fourth of July, in a speech given in Kuwait, the United States ambassador James Larauca pointed out that one of the most priceless reminders of the values of freedom is the yellow ribbon that was held by former U.S. President George W. Bush in reference to the suffering of the families of prisoners of Kuwait held in Iraqi prisons.

=== Malaysia ===
In Malaysia, the yellow ribbon is used as a symbol of press freedom.

=== New Zealand ===
It is also being used as a symbol of solidarity and remembrance for the Pike River miners trapped and killed after the explosion in the mine on 19 November 2010.

=== Philippines ===
In the Philippines, the yellow ribbon first gained prominence in the 1980s during the Martial Law era as a symbol of support for opposition leader Senator Benigno Aquino Jr. Inspired by the song Tie a Yellow Ribbon Round the Ole Oak Tree (with the song's lyrics serving as an allegory of Aquino's homecoming after a long period of incarceration and subsequent exile due to his criticism of the Marcos regime), supporters tied yellow ribbons along the streets of Metro Manila to welcome him home from his self-exile in the United States. Aquino never saw the ribbons as he was assassinated while disembarking at Manila International Airport on August 21, 1983. His death led to a series of events that culminated in the 1986 People Power Revolution that overthrew President Ferdinand Marcos. The color yellow was symbolic of the anti-Marcos movement, and eventually became associated with the new President, Aquino's widow Corazón Aquino.

The yellow ribbon regained popularity in 2009 as a show of support for an ailing Corazón Aquino. After her death on 1 August 2009, people wore yellow shirts, tied yellow ribbons along the street and added yellow ribbons on photos in social networking sites in mourning. Soon after, it was used by those pushing for Aquino's only son, Benigno Aquino III, to run in the May 2010 elections; it was eventually co-opted by his campaign.

In September 2010, wearing a yellow band of electrical tape around the index finger signified support of the "We Are One Filipino Movement", a Filipino-American rally for Benigno Aquino III at the Plaza de César Chavez in San Jose, California.

The colour is currently associated with the Aquino family and, by extension, the Liberal Party.

=== Singapore ===
In Singapore, the government has initiated in 2004 an annual Yellow Ribbon Campaign, through the Yellow Ribbon Project, to promote giving ex-convicts a second chance in society. Typically, a person shows his support for ex-convicts by pinning a yellow ribbon on his shirt during the annual campaign held in September. This was probably influenced by its use as a symbol of acceptance in the song "Tie A Yellow Ribbon Round the Old Oak Tree" as stated above.

=== South Korea ===
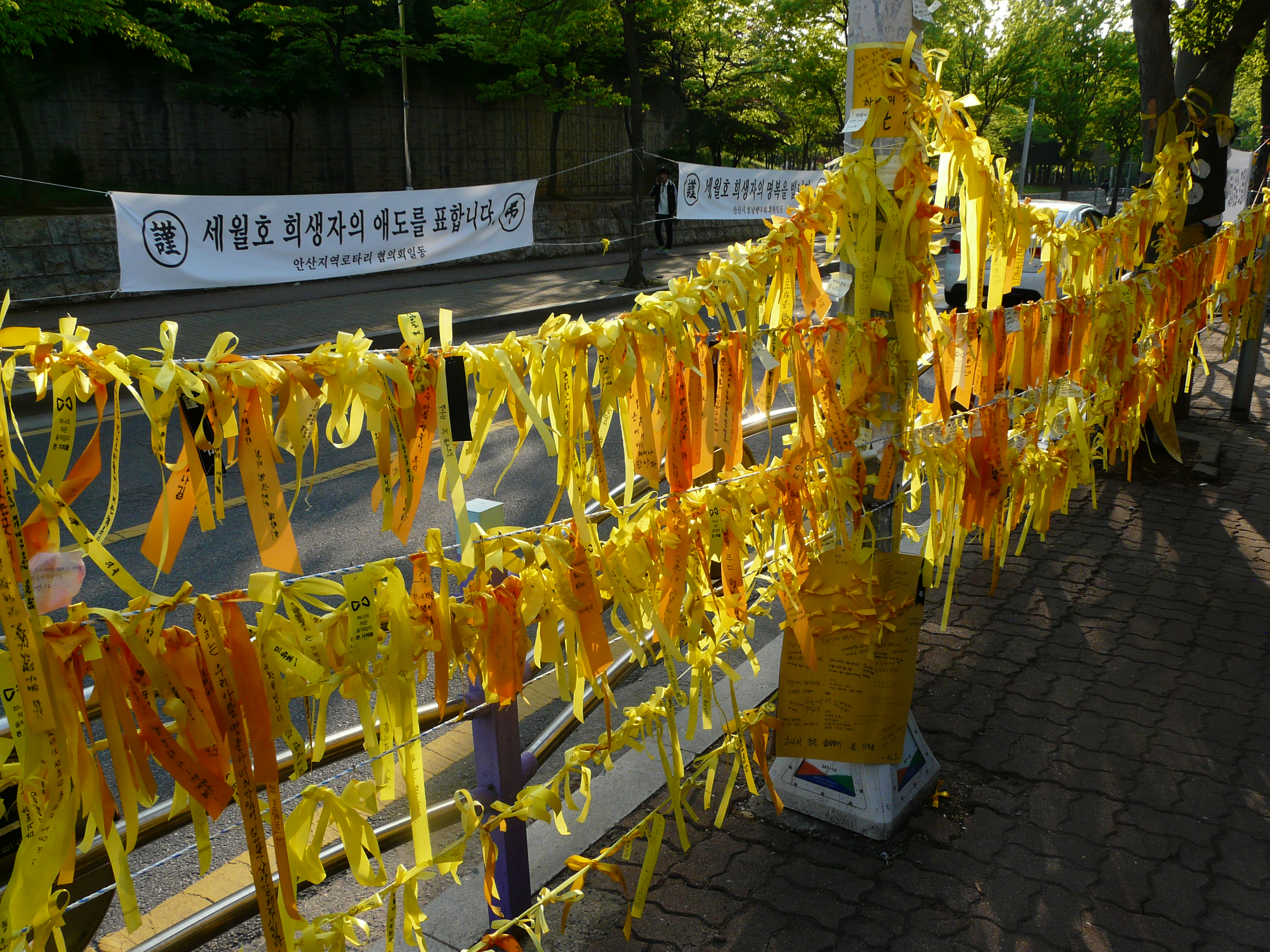
Yellow ribbons in Korea

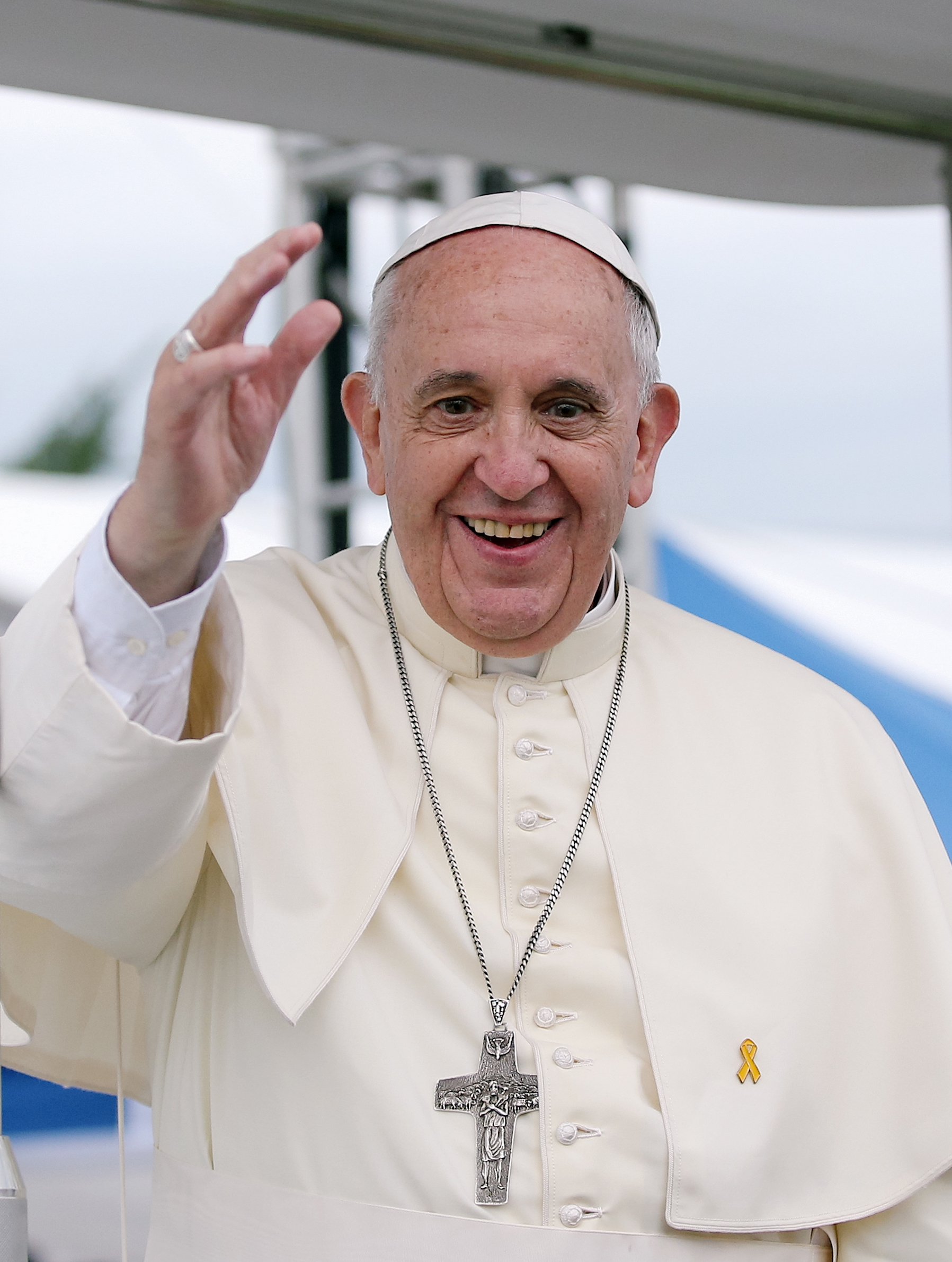
Pope Francis wearing a yellow ribbon on his 2014 trip to South Korea

In South Korea, the yellow ribbon is a symbol in memory of the victims and families of deceased of the 2014 MV Sewol disaster, in which 304 ferry passengers perished.

=== Spain ===
==== War of Succession ====
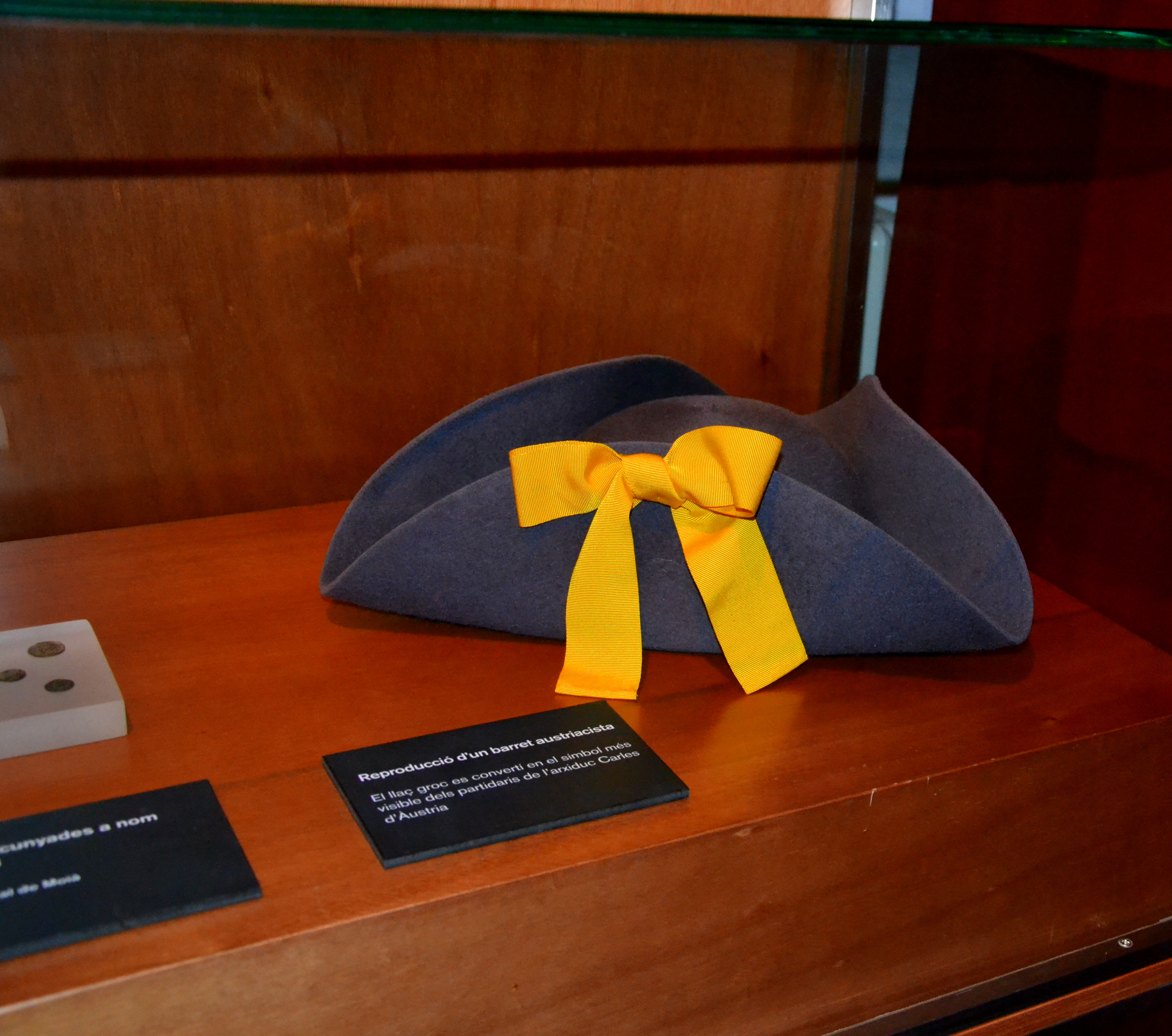
Replica of a hat with a yellow ribbon, the symbol of the supporters of Archduke Charles of Austria (the future emperor Charles VI) during the War of the Spanish Succession

The first well-known reference for the use of yellow cockades or ribbons in Spain is in 1704, when the viceroy of Catalonia Francisco Antonio Fernández de Velasco and Tovar, count of Melgar, banned its partisan use during the War of the Spanish Succession, stating that those using one may be "creating disagreements within families".

==== Catalan independence movement ====
In Catalonia, the yellow ribbon started being used in late October 2017 as a symbol of solidarity with the leaders of the two biggest pro-independence organizations, ANC and Òmnium Cultural (Jordi Sànchez and Jordi Cuixart respectively), arrested by the Spanish judiciary during the Operation Anubis on accusations of rioting, sedition and rebellion.

In November 2017, the meaning of the ribbon broadened to include the members of the Catalan regional government and the president of the Catalan Parliament, who were arrested by the Supreme Court of Justice for their alleged role in organizing referendum on Catalan independence, that was declared illegal by the Constitutional Court of Spain.

The yellow ribbon is also used to show support for former Catalan leaders in self-imposed exile, or flight from justice, depending on the point of view, including the former Catalan president Carles Puigdemont and four other regional Ministers, who had fled to Belgium and Scotland to avoid arrest and to seek broader European support for their cause that never arrived, due to the lack of constitutional consistency of their proposals; as well as Marta Rovira (leader of ERC) and Anna Gabriel (leader of CUP) who fled to Switzerland despite both not being required to appear in court.

FC Barcelona ex-player and coach, and current Manchester City manager, Pep Guardiola, has been wearing the ribbon

Sometimes, the yellow ribbon is also used to show support for other individuals that push for the Catalan independence and have faced legal consequences because of it. That includes Tamara Carrasco, Adrià Carrasco and other members of the Committees for the Defense of the Republic.

The Spanish electoral commission (Junta Electoral Central) has taken the position that the yellow ribbon is a political symbol and has sometimes banned its display on public buildings when an election is upcoming; in 2019, the Catalan government changed a yellow ribbon on a banner on its headquarters building in Barcelona to a white ribbon in response to such a ban. Fifty percent of Catalans are against the use of public buildings to carry out political propaganda for the pro-independence parties, and are deprived of their right to political neutrality of the institutions by the regional pro-independence government. Blue ribbons have also been used in this way.

=== Ukraine ===
In Ukraine, the "Yellow Ribbon" resistance movement was created in April 2022, after the start of Russia's invasion of the country, within the Russian-occupied territories of Ukraine. Yellow ribbons were used as a symbol of Ukrainian resistance against the Russian occupation, with the symbol sometimes appearing in graffiti.

=== United Kingdom ===
==== Support for military veterans ====
A British charity named the Yellow Ribbon Foundation was founded in 2003 to support military veterans.

==== Arsenal F.C. ====
In English football, a modified version is sung by Arsenal F.C. fans in FA Cup matches:

She wore, she wore, she wore a yellow ribbon
She wore a yellow ribbon in the merry month of May
And when I asked her why she wore that ribbon
She said it's for the Arsenal and we're going to Wembley

Wembley, Wembley
We're the famous Arsenal and we're going to Wembley.

The song has particular resonance as Arsenal's away colours are often yellow and blue. The song is also used by Manchester United, with the word 'yellow' replaced by 'scarlet', referencing their signature home colour.

== See also ==
- Activism
- World Suicide Prevention Day
