= Orange ribbon =

Type of symbol

The orange ribbon is a symbol adopted for a large variety of uses in various places.

== Worldwide ==
The orange ribbon is used for the United Nations International Day for the Elimination of Racial Discrimination. This is held in March and coincides with Australia's Harmony Day. The ribbon shows awareness of racial tolerance, or cultural diversity. Orange ribbons are used during August to raise awareness and support for International Autoinflammatory Awareness Month. The orange and red-orange tones of the official logo and ribbon represent inflammation and fevers, which are prevalent in flare-ups of autoinflammatory diseases. The Autoinflammatory Alliance logo has these colors, alongside a design that represents an inflammation, the fevers/pain of the disorders, and the passion of the informed patient/supporter.

Orange ribbons raise awareness of malnutrition and its consequences.

It was used worldwide to promote awareness of self-harm on March 1, 2012. March 1 is designated as Self-injury Awareness Day (SIAD) around the world. On this day, some people choose to be more open about their own self-harm, and awareness organisations make special efforts to raise awareness about self-harm and prevention programmes. Some people wear an orange awareness ribbon to encourage awareness to self-harm.

Multiple sclerosis and complex regional pain syndrome (formerly known as Reflex Sympathetic Dystrophy) awareness both use orange ribbons.

Kidney cancer and leukaemia both use orange awareness ribbons. It is also used in November for COPD Awareness Month.

== Australia ==
In Australia, orange ribbons are worn annually on March 21 to support Harmony Day and the message of a harmonious multicultural society. First organized in 1996, by the next year the 'Orange Ribbon' was embraced by thousands of people across Australia and was worn by members of the all sides of politics at the 1997 Australia Day celebrations in capital cities Australia-wide.

== Canada ==
In Canada, orange ribbons are worn as an awareness ribbon symbolizes Addiction Recovery. The campaign was launched on October 1, 2004 by the non-profit group R.A.F.T. for their first “Walk for Recovery”. It has since been adopted by a number of other support groups who battle addictions.

In the province of New Brunswick in Canada, orange ribbons are worn in response to the New Brunswick government's plan to sell many of the assets of New Brunswick Power (NB Power) to Hydro-Québec. The ribbons serve many purposes including making the public aware of the proposed sale, and making the government aware of the public opposition to the deal.

After the discovery of hundreds of unmarked graves at residential schools across the country, orange ribbons have begun to signify acknowledgement of unmarked graves, and honour or represent those deceased.

== Human rights in Tibet ==
As part of the International Tibet Support Network, Friends of Tibet (NZ) and the Tibetan community will launch the ORANGE RIBBON Campaign 8 August 2008, which is the day of the opening ceremony of the Olympics. This is to remind China that we have not forgotten the illegal occupation of Tibet while China enjoys world attention.

“Light Candle4tibet and wearing of Orange Ribbon on Friday and during the term of the Olympics are reminders that, all is not as harmonious as China is promoting, and that the people of Tibet will not be forgotten “ said Thuten Kesang, the Chairman of Friends of Tibet (NZ).

== Israel ==
In Israel, orange ribbons indicate opposition to the Israel "disengagement" plan of 2004 which involved withdrawal from the Gaza Strip (blue ribbons indicate support). Although the disengagement was completed in 2005, supporters continue to use the color orange as a symbol of general opposition to further Israeli withdrawals. Often written on the post-Disengagement ribbons is the phrase "לא נשכח ולא נסלח" ("we will not forget and we will not forgive").

== Japan ==
In Japan, the orange ribbon is promoted as a symbol of Child Abuse Prevention. The Ministry of Health, Labor and Welfare has designated November as Child Abuse Prevention Month.

== Nigeria ==
In Nigeria the Orange Ribbon Initiative is an advocacy program designed to support children with developmental disabilities, most especially the Autism Spectrum Disorders (ASD). It seeks to ensure that these children are not stigmatized and that they receive the required support from parents, teachers, friends, government and the society.

== Northern Ireland and UK ==
Orange ribbons are used in Northern Ireland (also known as Ulster) and some parts of the UK to show support for British rule in Northern Ireland, and loyalists who support it - in opposition to the Republicans, who want an end to British rule and for Northern Ireland and the republic of Ireland to be united. It is associated with the Protestant religion, the Orange order and Orangemen, which derive their names from William of Orange, a former king of England.

== Singapore ==
In Singapore, the orange ribbon is promoted as a symbol of racial and religious harmony, including friendship and kinship.

== Sweden ==
In the 1920s, an orange ribbon was used for the national association of overallklubbar, clubs promoting a radical change in fashion meaning everyone should wear jumpsuits.

In Sweden, the orange ribbon was the common symbol for a change of government in the national election in September 2006. The orange ribbon is an initiative from the Young Conservatives, the Young Liberals, the Young Christian-Democrats and the Young Center.

== Ukraine ==
It is a symbol of the Ukrainian Orange Revolution of 2004. The orange color denotes the color of the opposition party of Viktor Yushchenko.

== United States ==
In the United States, the orange ribbon has become a support color for:

- Those affected by Leukemia, a type of cancer that affects blood cells. The Leukemia and Lymphoma Society organizes awareness campaigns for leukemia during September. Leukemia accounts for 35% of all blood cancer diagnoses in the United States.
- Infertility Awareness, USA National Infertility Awareness Week (NIAW) is an annual event during the last week of April.
- Primary Ciliary Dyskinesia (PCD), a rare lung disease
- Gun violence protests
- At-risk animal awareness. The orange ribbon has been officially registered with the U.S. Patent and Trademark Office as the Animal Guardian Ribbon. It was created in 2003 by Rational Animal, a nonprofit media animal advocacy group in conjunction with the Mayor's Alliance for New York City's Animals. At-risk animals are defined as those "non-human animals who suffer from neglect or abuse or whose very lives and well-being are in jeopardy".
- Work zone safety awareness. A reflective orange ribbon is used by the American Road & Transportation Builders Association Transportation Development Foundation to promote awareness and to honor roadway construction workers who have died at work.
- Multiple sclerosis awareness month. The month of March has unofficially been deemed multiple sclerosis awareness month and the color orange was widely adopted by the supporters. It was never officially announced as the color of choice by major organizations, like many other illnesses that use orange, but it is used by all members to express support and awareness.
