= Black ribbon =

Symbol of mourning

Black ribbon

A black ribbon is a symbol of remembrance or mourning. It is often worn or put on a public display to express consolation.

== Sign of mourning ==
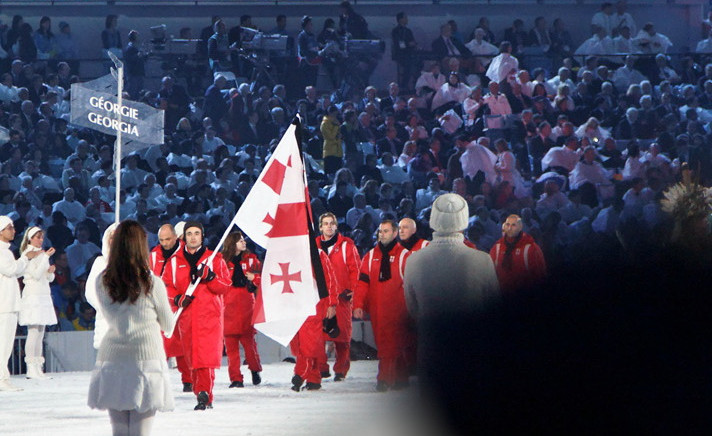
A black ribbon may be put on a flag, as on the Georgian flag at the 2010 Winter Olympics opening ceremony.

Similar to a black armband, the black ribbon is a public display of grief. Individuals or organizations display the ribbon in commemoration of victims after specific incidents.

For example, they have been used in mourning the May 1992 Westray Mine Disaster in Canada; the death of Diana, Princess of Wales in 1997; and after the April 2007 Virginia Tech shooting in Virginia. A black ribbon was projected onto the Sydney Opera House in April 2024 as a tribute to the victims of the 2024 Bondi Junction stabbings in Sydney, Australia.

The search engine Google, which often changes the company's logo to a Google Doodle commemorating timely events, has used the black ribbon to mark a number of incidents. These include the Charlie Hebdo shooting, the charter flight crash in Colombia in November 2016, the 2017 Portugal wildfires, and the death of Queen Elizabeth II. April 9, 2017, Google Arabic displayed a black ribbon as a mark of respect and sympathy for victims of 2017 Palm Sunday church bombings in Tanta and Alexandria, Egypt.

To show sympathy for victims of the 2023 earthquake in Turkey and Syria, Turkish Wikipedia and Apple's website homepage in Turkey changed to show a glowing black ribbon atop a dark background.

== Other meanings ==
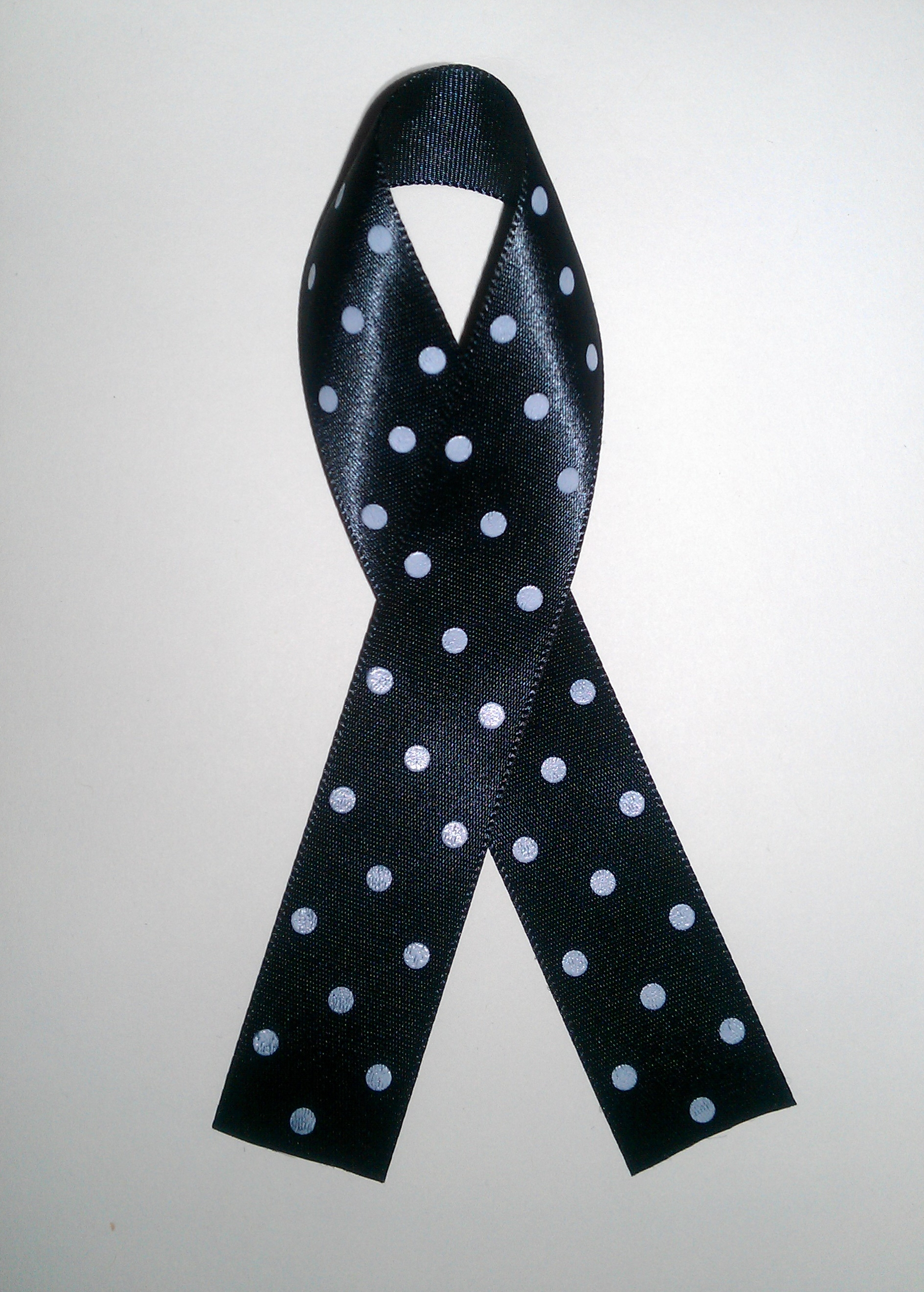
Melanoma awareness ribbon alternative with white polka dots

- Melanoma awareness. Sometimes shown as black with white polka dots.
- In Argentina, a black ribbon, sometimes with the national flag's colours in both ends, is used to raise awareness about the victims of subversive terrorism.
- By the Anarchist Black Ribbon Campaign, a free speech campaign started in 1996 inspired by the Blue Ribbon Online Free Speech Campaign.
- During the 6th International Israeli Apartheid Week (IAW) the black ribbon was worn worldwide to show support and promote awareness of the Palestinian struggle.
- In India, 2011 to show support to Anna Hazare who was fasting to fight against corruption by government.
- Worn by people who have suffered from any intentions of self harming on November 30 of every year.
- In New Zealand, a black ribbon with a koru symbol supports an end to domestic violence. In Australia, a black ribbon raises awareness against domestic abuse of men and fathers.

== See also ==
- Black Ribbon Day - August 23
- Half-mast
- List of awareness ribbons
