= Blue ribbon =

Symbol of high quality

Blue ribbons are typically a symbol of high quality. The association comes from The Blue Riband, a prize awarded for the fastest crossing of the Atlantic Ocean by passenger liners and, prior to that from Cordon Bleu, which referred to the blue ribbon worn by the French knightly Order of the Holy Spirit. The spelling "blue riband" is still encountered in most English-speaking countries, but in the United States, the term was altered to blue ribbon, and ribbons of this color came to be awarded for first place in certain athletic or other competitive endeavors (such as county and state fairs).

It has also been applied to distinguished members of a group or commission who have convened to address a situation or problem; in these cases, the usual usage is "blue ribbon commission" or "blue-ribbon panel".

== Fair competitions ==
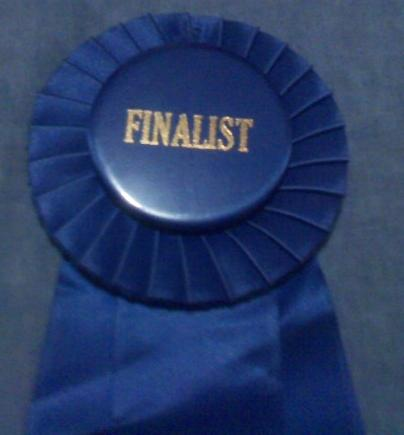
A blue ribbon won at a convention

In some fair competitions in the U.S., particularly 4-H and FFA livestock and horticultural events, blue ribbons may be awarded to any project or exhibit which meets or exceeds all of a competition's judging criteria. In Canada, New Zealand and Great Britain, blue ribbons are awarded to second place, with red ribbons awarded to first.

The project may not necessarily be the first-place finisher, however. In such cases, a purple ribbon may be given to the champion and the second-place (or reserve) champion.

== Usage as an awareness or activism ribbon ==
Blue ribbons have also been used as awareness ribbons for numerous different causes. Notable examples:

- The "Blue Ribbon Online Free Speech Campaign" is an online campaign by the EFF endorsing the protection of free speech on the Internet.
- The blue ribbon is internationally used to spread awareness of chronic fatigue syndrome.
- A blue ribbon is also the ribbon used for awareness for the autoimmune disease of Sjögren's syndrome.
- Blue ribbons are used internationally to express solidarity for the safe return of the hostages taken by Hamas in Israel.
- In Canada, it is the symbol of an anti-tobacco, anti-second hand smoke campaign. It has the same meaning in Japan.
- Students of the Hugh Boyd Secondary School in Richmond, British Columbia started the "Blue Ribbon Campaign" in 1999. Each year it has grown and now has taken on a national scope. Singapore is the first country in the region to adopt The Blue Ribbon initiative started by the World Health Organization Western Pacific Region, on a nationwide scale with 10 markets and food centres.
- In Spain, a blue ribbon (lazo azul) was used between 1993 and 2018 by those opposing the terrorism of ETA.
- During the political battle in Israel over the disengagement from the Gaza Strip, blue ribbons indicated support for the disengagement, while orange ribbons indicated opposition.
- In Japan, a blue ribbon is a symbol against abductions of Japanese citizen by North Korea, which took place during 1977 to 1983. The blue ribbon symbolizes the Sea of Japan, between Japan and Korea.
- In the Philippines, the Senate has a Blue Ribbon Committee which serves as an oversight to government accountability and conducts investigations against corrupt officials.
- In spring 2007, thousands of World Bank employees started wearing blue ribbons as a symbol of support for the cause of good governance. This was seen as a silent protest against World Bank President Paul Wolfowitz, who had to step down several weeks later due to charges of nepotism.
- In Sweden, there is a temperance organization with the name "Blå bandet" (The Blue Ribbon).
- In the United States, blue ribbons are also symbols for several disorders. The blue ribbon (and awareness bracelet from CCFA) are used to signify Crohn's disease, ulcerative colitis, and associated gastrointestinal diseases. A light blue ribbon is the symbol of prostate cancer awareness, a royal blue ribbon is the symbol of mesothelioma awareness, and a dark blue ribbon is the symbol of colorectal cancer (colon cancer and rectal cancer) awareness. Blue is also used in the multi-colored ribbons symbolizing awareness of bladder cancer and thyroid cancer. Shaped like the letter "P", it is an American symbol for Parkinson's disease.
- The blue ribbon is used as an emblems against child abuse by the National Exchange Club for their national project, the Prevention of Child Abuse. The Club adopted the blue ribbon in 1979 with the encouragement of National President Edward North Jr., a physician from Jackson, Mississippi, who observed increased instances of abuse through his medical practice. The blue ribbon became the emblem of the project following the example of Bonnie Finney. The club sponsors numerous Blue Ribbon Campaigns and Child Abuse Prevention Month in April. In the wake of the Penn State child sex abuse scandal, the Penn State Nittany Lions football team announced that they will wear a blue ribbon to support child abuse victims.
- The blue ribbon in Hong Kong represents support of the Hong Kong police, in opposition to the yellow ribbon, which represents the Umbrella movement since the 2014 Hong Kong protests.
- In Denmark, FAIM (Association for Autoimmune Diseases) uses the Blue ribbon to represent all autoimmune diseases (https://www.faim.dk/awareness-logo-og-sloejfe-for-alle-autoimmune-sygdomme/)
- The Norwegian Cancer Society (NCS) has a blue ribbon campaign each November, in order to raise awareness about prostate cancer.

== Companies and products ==
- The Italian Peroni Brewery has a beer "Nastro Azzurro" referring to the Blue Riband held by the Italian SS Rex from 1933 to 1935.
- Beginning in the 1940s, Warner Bros., in a cost-conserving effort, began to reissue its backlog of color cartoons under a new program which they called Merrie Melodies "Blue Ribbon" reissues. For the reissue, the original front-and-end title sequences were altered.
- Blue Ribbon Barbecue is a chain of two restaurants and a catering service in the Boston suburbs.
- Pabst Blue Ribbon Beer, which took its name from the silk ribbons tied around every bottle starting in 1882 to mark the beer's many fair awards, a practice that continued until 1916.
- Blue Ribbon is a brand of ice cream sold in Australia and owned by Unilever.
- Blue Ribbon Dive Resort is a 5 Star PADI dive resort in Mabini, Anilao in the Philippines

== Other uses ==
- Blue ribbons for boys (and pink for girls) were used from the mid-19th century on christening gowns in Paris, and to a limited extent in the United States. In St. Petersburg (Russia) ribbons of the same color scheme were used on white funeral shrouds for children.
- In Australia and New Zealand, safe seats are sometimes described as "blue-ribbon seats". Safe seats for the two countries' major centre-left parties (the Australian Labor Party and the New Zealand Labour Party) were in a single instance referred to by a prominent daily newspaper as "red-ribbon seats", however this is not a legitimate point of reference, as seats where any political interest holds as strong majority have for many decades, commonly been called blue ribbon seats.
- In Australia, blue ribbon is also a term referring to shares of any company on the stock exchange deemed to be secure investment.

== See also ==
- Blue Riband (disambiguation) for other uses of the term Blue Riband
- Blue Ribbon Awards
- Blue Ribbon Schools Program
- Medals of Honor (Japan)
