= Yellow Ribbon Suicide Prevention Program =

Suicide prevention program in the US

YRSPP
- Yellow Ribbon Suicide Prevention Program
- Formation: Started in 1994.
- Purpose: Suicide prevention, particularly teenage suicide prevention
- Location: United States

The Yellow Ribbon Suicide Prevention Program (YRSPP) is a suicide prevention program based in the United States, and aimed in particular at teenagers. The program is run by the Yellow Ribbon non-profit. YRSPP uses a yellow ribbon with a heart to encourage awareness about suicide / suicide prevention.

== Yellow Ribbon Week ==
YRSPP observe a suicide prevention week called Yellow Ribbon Week annually in September. Yellow Ribbon Week is the week including World Suicide Prevention Day, September 9.

== History ==
The Yellow Ribbon Suicide Prevention Program began in 1994, after the death of Mike Emme by suicide.
