= Self-injury Awareness Day =

Mental health awareness campaign

The orange ribbon of self-harm awareness

Self-injury Awareness Day (SIAD) (also known as Self-Harm Awareness Day) is a grassroots annual awareness event on March 1 focused on raising awareness about self-harm. On the day, and in the weeks leading up to it and after, some people choose to be more open about their own self-harm, and awareness organizations make special efforts to raise awareness about self-harm and self-injury. Some people wear an orange awareness ribbon, write "LOVE" on their arms, draw a butterfly on their wrists in awareness of "the Butterfly Project" wristband or beaded bracelet to encourage awareness of self-harm. The goal of the people who observe SIAD is to break down the common stereotypes surrounding self-harm and to educate medical professionals about the condition.

== Background ==
SIAD was created to spread awareness and understanding of self-injury, which is often misrepresented and misunderstood in the mainstream. Those who self-harm are often left feeling alone and afraid to reach out for help because they fear they will be seen as "crazy".

== See also ==
- Mental health
- Self-harm
- List of awareness days
- World Suicide Prevention Day
