= Yellow Ribbon Campaign and Sewol Ferry Protest Movement =

South Korean symbol

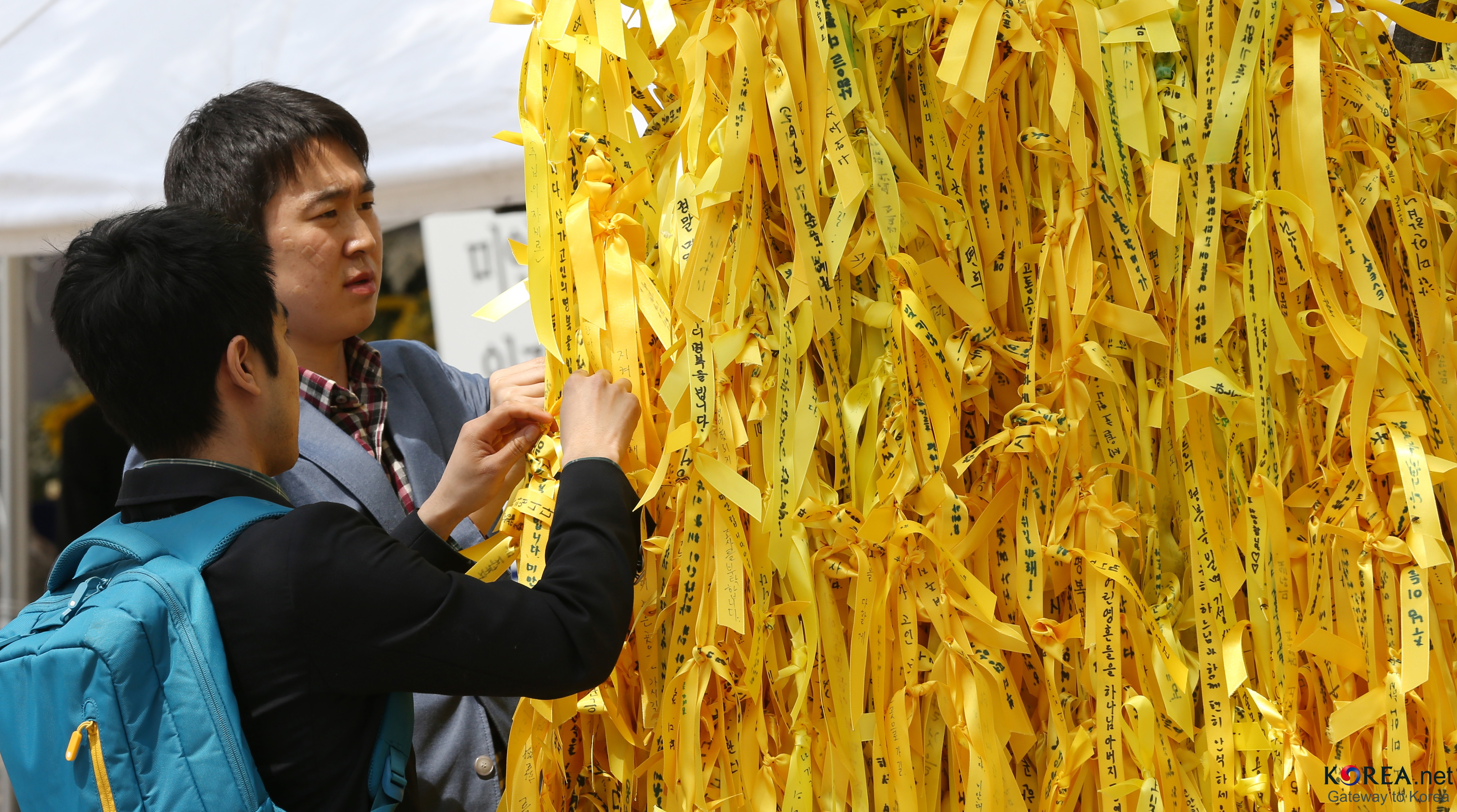
Two people looking at yellow ribbons in Seoul Plaza in 2014.

Following the Sewol ferry sinking on 16 April 2014, yellow ribbons became a prevalent symbol in South Korea, its significance evolving from hopes of return and mourning to activism and democratization. Historically, yellow colored ribbons were used as a symbol of support for military troops in Western countries including the U.S., Canada, Germany, Sweden, and Denmark, its usage mainly signifying hopes of someone's safe return. During the 1980s, the yellow ribbons were adopted in the Philippines as a symbol of democratization, which inspired South Korea to use the symbol for democratization as well. When the Sewol ferry capsized off South Korea's southern coast near Jindo County on 16 April 2014, the yellow ribbon quickly became a widespread symbol online symbolizing hopes of return of the passengers. However, once it became clear that the victims would not be coming back, citizens began questioning the competency of the government. The significance of the yellow ribbon evolved from symbolizing public remembrance and sympathy to defiance against the government, activism and protest culture, and democratization. As a result of the apolitical symbol's transformation into a political one, the color yellow quickly became a topic of contention. Regardless, tiny yellow ribbons circulated widely all over South Korea, both virtually through social media and physically through portable items and at significant sites. Yellow ribbons, in tandem with other yellow-colored items, came to define spaces of protest and political resistance among progressive activists in South Korea.

== Historical context ==
=== West ===
The use of yellow ribbons originates in the West, where they were used as a symbol of support for military troops by anti-militarist peace activists in countries such as the U.S., Canada, Germany, Sweden, and Denmark during the 1970s. The yellow ribbons were used as signs of hope for someone's safe return, which was the inspiration of the 1973 hit song by Tony Orlando and Dawn called "Tie a Yellow Ribbon Round the Ole Oak Tree." While the yellow ribbon campaigns that stood for the slogan "Support Our Troops/Oppose the War" had already been launched as soldiers were returning from the Vietnam War, showcasing the yellow ribbons became even a bigger national phenomenon later during the Iran Hostage Crisis between 1979–1981, where the vivid yellow color symbolized hopes of safe return.

=== Philippines ===
The yellow ribbon campaign took a different trajectory in Asia as civilian activists in the Philippines started using them for democratization rather than associating them with troops. When Benigno Aquino, Jr., returned to Manila in 1983 after three years in exile, his supporters covered the streets with vivid yellow ribbons to welcome his return. However, Aquino was assassinated and his wife, Corazón Aquino continued her husband's political legacy and led the People Power Revolution of 1986, with the yellow ribbon as her primary symbol. Through this event, the yellow ribbon became a symbol for democracy in the Philippines.

=== South Korea ===
In 1986, the same year as the People Power Revolution of 1986 in the Philippines, South Korean activists distributed yellow-colored ribbons to support direct elections to advocate for democratization in Korea. During the late 1980s, the vivid yellow color was the prominent color in protests following the deaths of students in pro-democracy demonstrations in Seoul, and the yellow ribbons symbolized leftist opposition politics. An occasion where the yellow ribbons were used to represent hopes of safe return was when Korean missionaries were held captive in Afghanistan in 2007 and a few thousand of their supporters displayed yellow ribbons.

== Sewol Ferry Protest Movement ==
=== Sewol Ferry Sinking ===
On 16 April 2014, the Sewol, a ferry carrying 476 passengers and cargo, capsized off the southern coast of South Korea. This incident resulted in the deaths of 304 people, 250 of which were students from Danwon High School in Ansan, who were on a school field trip. Most of the 174 survivors had survived because they refused to obey the crew's order to "Stay where you are!" South Korea's Coast Guard had not managed to save the victims while the government and media reported that people were being rescued, adding to the agony of friends and family of the passengers.

=== Birth of the Yellow Ribbon Campaign ===
A group of university students known as Active Autonomous Alter Life Together (ALT) posted online a design featuring a bow outlined in black on a yellow background, with the caption, "May One Small Movement Bring a Great Miracle," to express hopes of the victims' safe return. The symbol went viral as people changed their profile pictures on social media accounts and Seoul decorated its streets with yellow ribbons. The original intent of the campaign was to signify hopes of return, but when it became clear that the victims would not return alive, the yellow ribbons became a symbol of mourning and remembrance. The significance of the symbol further evolved as people found out that these deaths could have been prevented and began to question and rebel against the government's incompetence. In the following months, the campaign gained further momentum as families of the victims adopted the yellow ribbons as their main symbol for protesting against the government.

=== Evolution ===
The yellow symbol was a crucial factor in the advancement of Sewol's commemoration development. In the beginning of the movement, mass gatherings featuring yellow ribbons, flowers, and candles were held to express hope for survivors. This hope soon evolved into grief and mourning as it became clear that victims would not return from the sunken ferry. Then, the yellow ribbons became an anti-government symbol as mass commemoration gatherings evolved into political protests expressing discontent against the South Korean government resulting from suspicions that the tragedy could have been avoided had the government been less irresponsible and corrupt. The yellow ribbon continued to be used as a prominent symbol signifying the demand for proper investigation of the ferry's sinking and effectively engaged the public for the next three years that eventually led to the impeachment of Park Geun-hye.

In one protest, protesters marched to the headquarters of the Korean Broadcasting System (KBS) to criticize the public corporation's distorted reports of the disaster. Then, the protest was taken to the Blue House, where the Korean president lives, to demand political neutrality of the Truth Commission proposed by former president, Park Geun-hye. This protest at the Blue House lasted for 76 days and the protesters moved to Kwanghwamun Square, a space of historical and political significance. Families of victims began fasting to urge authorities to adopt the Sewol Special Law that calling for proper investigation of the disaster and political reforms to avoid future tragedies. People flocked not only to Kwanghwamun Plaza to show solidarity and grief, but also virtual spaces, including YouTube and Facebook, where they posted photos and videos of their own fasting and yellow ribbons . In one hunger strike camp in Kwanghwamun Square, supporters started making yellow ribbons for mass distribution in stations called the "Ribbon Factory" where volunteers handmade small yellow ribbons. All over Korea, people protested with banners that read 'Life before profit' or 'People before money,' implying that the government prioritized profit over the lives of the victims. When the response of the state continued to be inadequate for the people, protesters' grief turned into anger at the government, prompting a petition-signing that aimed to collect 10,000,000 signatures.

==== Impeachment of Park Geun-hye ====
In 2017, three years after the Sewol Ferry Sinking, the former president of South Korea, Park Geun-hye, was removed from office. During the months leading up to this momentous event, the yellow symbols of Sewol commemoration were always present on political slogans and impeachment demonstrations. Sewol family members always led the marches and their speeches were commonly incorporated in the protests. in 2016, a 30-foot-tall art installation called huimang chotbul ("the candle of hope") was placed in Kwanghwamun Square. This statue, serving as a combination of both Sewol protest and impeachment efforts, was covered in yellow ribbons on which citizens wrote their hopes for a better Korea and messages to the victims of the sinking. The sinking of the Sewol was a key driving factor of the former president's impeachment, as people questioned the president's whereabouts during the capsizing of the ferry and demanded political transparency from their state. In this way, the yellow ribbon's significance evolved to represent re-democratization in South Korea.

==== Contention ====
Wearing the yellow ribbon became categorized by authorities as a form of activism and rebellion, signifying anger at the "disappearance and failure of the state" during the sinking. The government asserts that the yellow ribbon became a political symbol rather than a commemorative, emotional expression. As a result, the Korean Ministry of Education banned the use or display of yellow ribbons in schools. Although a group of students submitted a complaint to the National Human Rights Committee, stating that they have the freedom of expression and conscience, the complaint was rejected. Wearing the symbol outside of schools caused conflict as well. For example, when former president of South Korea Park Geun-hye was impeached, her supporters targeted those wearing the yellow ribbons for harassment, which sometimes turned violent. Even years after the sinking, the contention around the symbol continued. For example, during the beginning stages of the Candlelight Movement, a member of a conservative church in Seoul was removed from the congregation for wearing the yellow ribbon. In addition, because the yellow ribbons were strongly associated with protest, those who supported the government refused to wear this emblem.

== Circulation ==
=== Virtual ===
As one of the world's most highly connected societies, South Korea experienced a new form of political participation through the Internet in the early twenty-first century. Mass protests formed on the Internet and driven by youth became an effective and common way of activism in South Korea. Images of yellow ribbons were circulated on the Internet as people, including famous K-pop celebrities with millions of followers, changed their profile pictures on social media such as Instagram and Facebook or posted pictures of the yellow ribbons. Naver, Korea's national search engine (equivalent to America's Google), featured a black ribbon on a yellow background with the caption, "One Small Step, Big Miracle" and launched an online ribbon campaign with the National Disaster Relief Association in order to raise funds for the victims' families.

=== Portable ===
Tiny yellow ribbons decorated backpacks, bicycles, wallets, windowsills of cafes, doors, fences, car windows, and other places all over South Korea. Politicians from liberal factions showed their solidarity by wearing yellow ribbons. These ribbons were commonly distributed for free by two biggest producers: a workshop called the Yellow Ribbon Factory in the People's Solidarity for Participatory Democracy (PSPD) building and the "Sewol Square" in Kwanghwamun Square in Seoul. Every Wednesday, the Yellow Ribbon Factory opened itself to the public and produced hundreds of little yellow Sewol ribbons per session, which are picked up by other civic organizations and distributed to the public for free. These ribbons were made of yellow foam boards cut into 7 mm-wide strips that are twisted and glued into ribbon-shapes and attached to a metal chain. The color yellow symbolizing hope and solidarity took other forms as well, including yellow hats, fans, handkerchiefs, bracelets, cell-phone stickers, keychains, balloons, depictions of butterflies, paper life-boats, t-shirts, and linen brooches, often featuring a yellow flower and the number 4.16 signifying the date of the ferry disaster. Some organizations sold these yellow-colored items to raise funds for families of victims, but most yellow ribbons were handed out for free to keep the Sewol issue visible.

=== Key Sites ===
Yellow ribbons covered the classrooms of the Sewol Ferry Sinking victims at Danwon High School in Ansan for months and years after the disaster. The ten abandoned classrooms of the 250 students who died during the sinking became known as the "memory classrooms" where families, relatives, and classmates left drawings and messages on the blackboards and turned the desks into altars. Another key site of Sewol memory activism is the Kwanghwamun or Kwanghwamun Plaza in the heart of Seoul, where people volunteered every day to handmade yellow ribbon charms in large tents and distribute them to supporters for the purpose of continuing the public display of solidarity, demanding to reveal the truth behind the disaster. Seoul Plaza in front of City Hall, a key space for activism, also became a sea of yellow in the following weeks after the disaster. The chainlink fences and trees at the vigil location Paengmok Harbor on Jindo Island, the land closest to the location of the ferry's capsizing, were densely covered with yellow ribbons, serving as another key site of Sewol memory activism. Two commemorative protests sites including the community cemetery at Mangwoldong in Gwangju and the activist community in Gangjeong Village also became immersed in yellow ribbons to display solidarity to the victims' families. The Mangwoldong community cemetery in Gwangju was a site of Koran democratization where casualties of the 1980 Gwangju Massacre were initially buried and the activists in Gangjeong Village oppose the newly constructed Jeju Naval Base which they believe will cause a war in the future.

== See also ==
- 2016–17 South Korean protests
