= Rational Animal (organization) =

- Established: 2002 (24 years ago)
- Founder: Susan Brandt
- Type: 501(c)(3) non-profit
- Purpose: Animal welfare
- Location: New York City, New York, US
- Volunteers: 60
- Website: rational-animal.org

Rational Animal is a 501(c)(3) non-profit organization that advocates for at-risk animals, primarily in the New York City area. It was founded in 2002 by Susan Brandt.

== Projects ==
- The orange Animal Guardian Ribbon started in 2003 and represents support for vulnerable animals nationwide. This was achieved in coordination with the Mayor's Alliance for New York City's Animals.
- Gingerbread Homes for Animals, first held in 2004, is a yearly education and fundraising event aimed at increasing awareness of at-risk animals.
- Gimme Shelter: Rock & Rescue NYC is an annual fundraising concert that began in 2006 and benefits animal rescue and no-kill shelters.
- "Trails to Tails" is a map of New York City highlighting various animal-friendly locations such as adoption shelters and dog parks. The project began in 2004 and was released to the public in 2010, with funding from the ASPCA, the Pedigree Foundation, and New York Tails Magazine.
