= Blue Ribbon Online Free Speech Campaign =

Online advocacy campaign

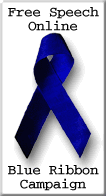
Example Blue Ribbon graphic EFF encourages websites to use.

The Blue Ribbon Online Free Speech Campaign (officially the Blue Ribbon Campaign for Online Freedom of Speech, Press and Association) is an online advocacy campaign for intellectual freedom on the Internet, orchestrated by the Electronic Frontier Foundation (EFF). Web site owners are encouraged to place images of blue ribbons on their sites and link to EFF's campaign. This is done so that they can help spread awareness of the threats to unrestricted speech in new media.

== History ==
The campaign was launched immediately after the passing of the Communications Decency Act (CDA) in the United States on February 1, 1996, followed by the Black World Wide Web protest on February 8, 1996, and remained popular throughout the 1990s and into the early 2000s. The Communications Decency Act was ruled unconstitutional in large part by the Supreme Court on June 26, 1997 in a joint ACLU/EFF suit. EFF relaunched the campaign on June 15, 1998 to raise awareness of other legislation that they felt threatened freedom of expression online, especially the CDA follow-up bill, the Child Online Protection Act (COPA), also eventually overturned.
