= Red ribbon =

Awareness colored symbol

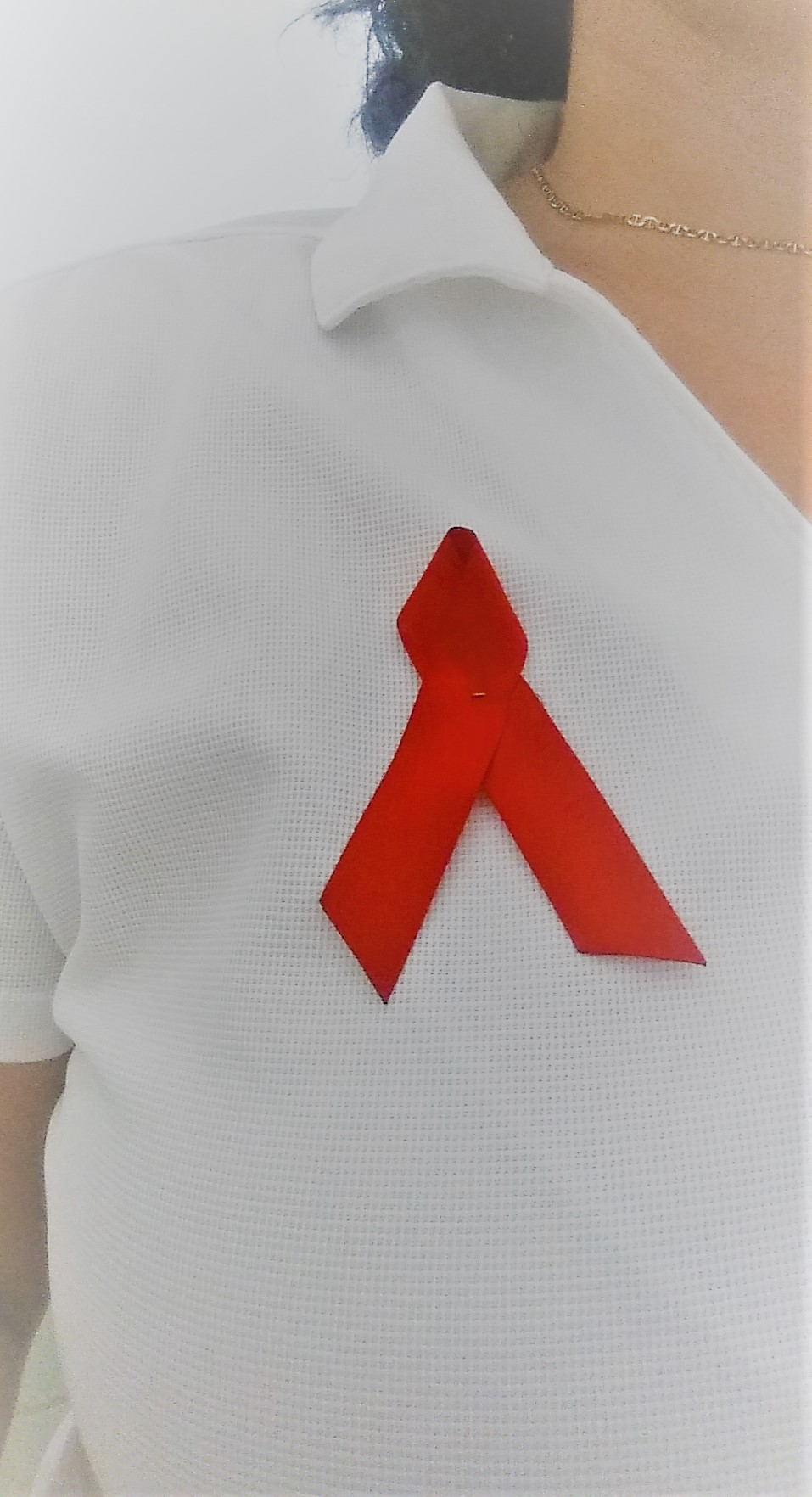
A person wearing a red awareness ribbon

The red ribbon, as an awareness ribbon, is used as the symbol for the solidarity of people living with HIV/AIDS, and for the awareness and prevention of drug abuse and drunk driving.

== Awareness symbol ==
The red ribbon is a symbol for Multiple Sclerosis, drunk driving prevention, drug prevention and for the fight against HIV/AIDS. The Red Ribbon Foundation, Mothers Against Drunk Driving (MADD) and the Canadian Multiple Sclerosis Society are examples of organizations that utilize the red ribbon symbol.

MADD is an organization founded in 1980 whose mission is to stop drunk driving, support the victims of this violent crime and prevent underage drinking. Red Ribbon International is an organization founded in 1993 whose main purpose is the education about the prevention of the Human Immunodeficiency Virus or HIV, Acquired Immune Deficiency Syndrome Related Complex, ARC and AIDS.

=== Mothers Against Drunk Driving (MADD) origins ===
In 1986, MADD started the "Tie One On For Safety" campaign. It is MADD's longest running and most visible public awareness project. During the holiday season, drivers are encouraged to tie MADD red ribbons to visible locations on their vehicles, or place window decals on their vehicles' windows. The red ribbons represent the drivers' commitment to drive safe, sober and buckled up. It also encourages others to designate a sober driver before drinking.

=== Alcohol, tobacco and other drug prevention awareness origin ===
The Red Ribbon was used as an awareness symbol made after DEA Agent Enrique Camarena was kidnapped, tortured, and murdered while working undercover in Guadalajara, Mexico. Citizens in his home town of Calexico, California donned the ribbons to emphasize the need for increased prevention efforts. In 1988, Red Ribbon Week, sponsored by National Family Partnership, became a national campaign. It is celebrated from October 23 through October 31.

=== AIDS awareness origin ===
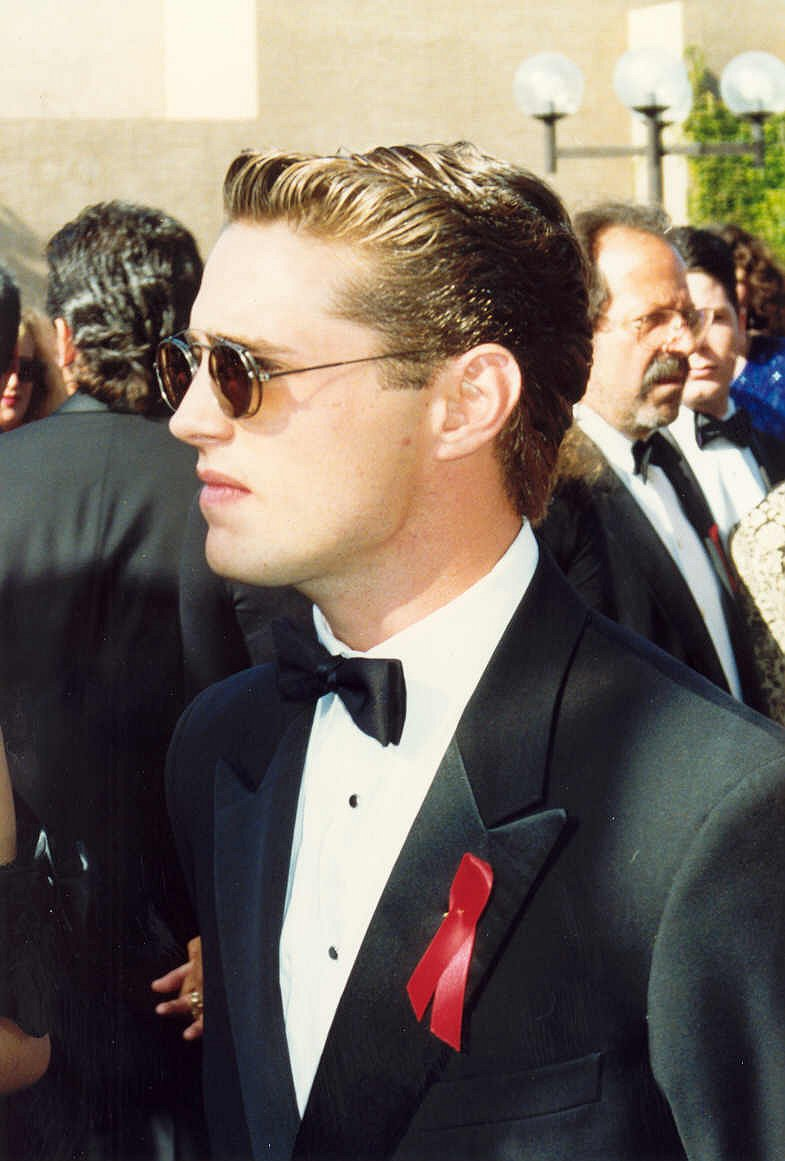
Actor Jason Priestley wearing a red awareness ribbon at the 1992 Emmy Awards

The Red Ribbon Project was created by the New York-based Visual AIDS Artists Caucus in 1991. Regarding the ribbon, they wished to:

1. Remain anonymous as individuals and to credit the Visual AIDS Artists Caucus as a whole in the creation of the Red Ribbon Project, and not to list any individual as the creator of the Red Ribbon Project;
2. Keep the image copyright free, so that no individual or organization would profit from the use of the red ribbon;
3. The Red Ribbon should be used as a consciousness raising symbol, not as a commercial or trademark tool.

The artists who formed the Visual AIDS Artists Caucus wished to create a visual symbol to demonstrate compassion for people living with AIDS and their caregivers. Inspired by the yellow ribbons honoring American soldiers serving in the Gulf war, the color red was chosen for its, "connection to blood and the idea of passion—not only anger, but love, like a valentine." First worn onscreen by a celebrity by Jeremy Irons at the 1991 Tony Awards, the red ribbon, which had been created that year, soon became renowned as an international symbol of AIDS awareness.

At the Freddie Mercury Tribute Concert held at Wembley Stadium, London on Easter Sunday 1992, more than 100,000 red ribbons were distributed among the audience by Red Ribbon International, with performers such as George Michael wearing one. The Red Ribbon continues to be a powerful force in the fight to increase public awareness of HIV/AIDS and in the lobbying efforts to increase funding for AIDS services and research.

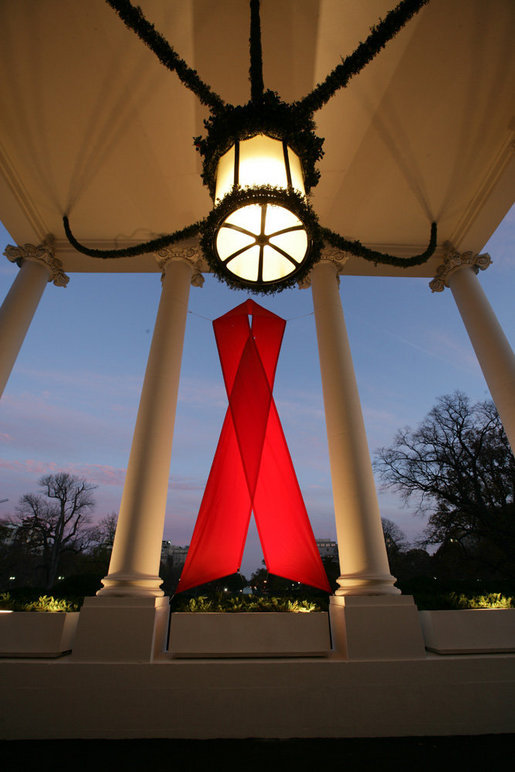
A large red ribbon hangs between columns in the north portico of the White House for World AIDS Day, November 30, 2007.

To symbolize the United States' commitment to combat the world AIDS epidemic through its landmark PEPFAR program, Steven M. Levine, a communications aid in President George W. Bush's administration, proposed that the administration display a 28 foot (8.5 m) AIDS ribbon on the White House's iconic North Portico on World AIDS Day 2007. The display, now an annual tradition across four administrations, quickly garnered attention, as it was the first banner, sign or symbol to prominently hang from the White House since Abraham Lincoln lived in the building.

=== 2021 Myanmar coup d'etat ===
In the aftermath of the 2021 Myanmar coup d'état, healthcare workers in Myanmar launched a red ribbon campaign (ဖဲကြိုးနီလှုပ်ရှားမှု). The color red is associated with the National League for Democracy, the incumbent political party that won the 2020 elections. Civil servants and workers across Myanmar, including union-level ministries, have adopted the red ribbon as a symbol of opposition to the military regime.

== Fair award ==
At fairs and competitions in the U.K. and Canada, a red ribbon is awarded to the winning competitor (first place). It is used for second place in the United States for fairs and competitions. In the U.S. in some judging competitions, particularly in 4-H and FFA livestock and horticultural competitions, red ribbons may be given to a project that meets some of the judging criteria but falls short in other areas, while superior projects and exhibits are awarded blue ribbons (which are second-place ribbons in the U.K. and Canada).

== See also ==
- Medals of Honor (Japan)
- Order of the Bath
- Paul Jabara – co-founder of the Red Ribbon Project
- Red tape
- Red Guards, Little Pink
- World AIDS Day
- Artists4Ceasefire, who adopted the red pin as their symbol
