= World Suicide Prevention Day =

Awareness day

World Suicide Prevention Day (WSPD) is an awareness day commitment and action to prevent suicides, with various activities around the world since 2003. The International Association for Suicide Prevention (IASP) collaborates with the World Health Organization (WHO) and the World Federation for Mental Health (WFMH) to host World Suicide Prevention Day. In 2011 an estimated 40 countries held awareness events to mark the occasion. According to WHO's Mental Health Atlas released in 2014, no low-income country reported having a national suicide prevention strategy, while less than 10% of lower-middle income countries, and almost a third of upper-middle and high-income countries had.

On its first event in 2003, the 1999 WHO's global suicide prevention initiative is mentioned with regard to the main strategy for its implementation, requiring:

1. "The organisation of global, regional and national multi-sectoral activities to increase awareness about suicidal behaviours and how to effectively prevent them."
2. "The strengthening of countries's capabilities to develop and evaluate national policies and plans for suicide prevention."

As of recent WHO releases, challenges represented by social stigma, the taboo to openly discuss suicide, and low availability of data are still to date obstacles leading to poor data quality for both suicide and suicide attempts: "given the sensitivity of suicide – and the illegality of suicidal behaviour in some countries – it is likely that under-reporting and misclassification are greater problems for suicide than for most other causes of death."

Suicide has a number of complex and interrelated and underlying contributing factors ... that can contribute to the feelings of pain and hopelessness. Having access to means to kill oneself – most typically firearms, medicines and poisons – is also a risk factor.

— Campaign release

== Background ==
An estimated one million people per year die by suicide or about one person in 10,000 (1.4% of all deaths), or "a death every 40 seconds or about 3,000 every day". As of 2004 the number of people who die by suicide is expected to reach 1.5 million per year by 2020.

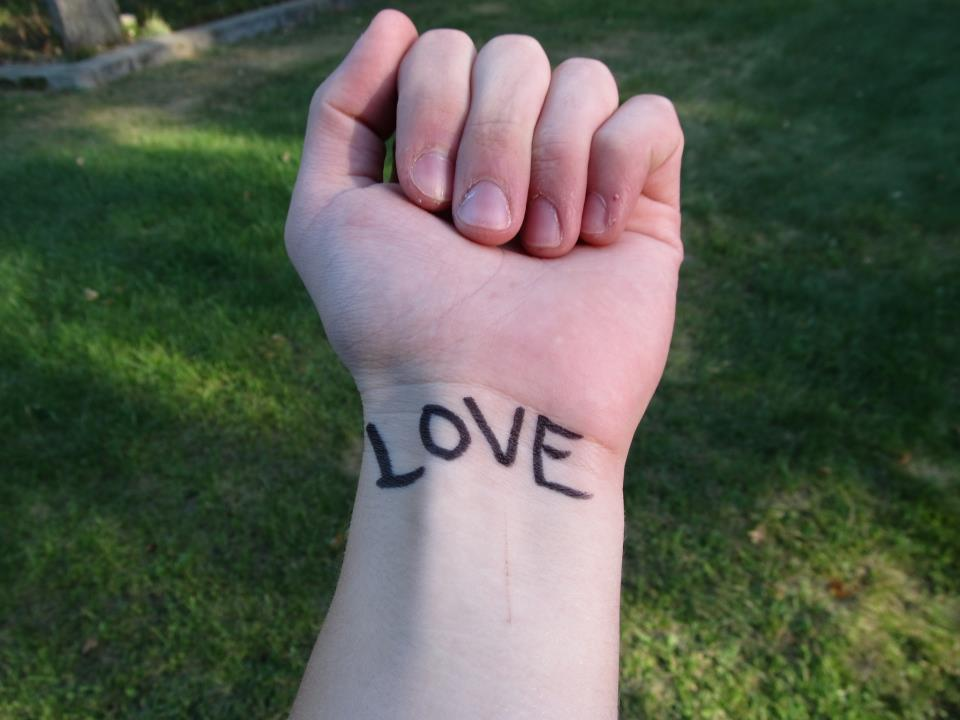
"LOVE" written on a person's wrist, an example of how individuals raise awareness on World Suicide Prevention Day

Suicide rates per 100,000 males (left) and females (right).

0 – 5
5 – 10

10 – 15
15 – 25

25 – 35
Above 35

No data

On average, three male suicides are reported for every female one, consistently across different age groups and in almost every country in the world. "Conversely, rates of suicide attempts tend to be 2-3 times higher in women than in men, although the gender gap has narrowed in recent years." More people die from suicide than from murder and war; it is the 13th leading cause of death worldwide. According to WHO there are twenty people who have a suicide attempt for every one that is fatal, at a rate approximately one every three seconds. Suicide is the "most common cause of death for people aged 15 – 24."

According to WHO, suicide accounts for nearly half of all violent deaths in the world. Brian Mishara, IASP president, noted that, "more people kill themselves than die in all wars, terrorist acts and interpersonal violence combined." As of 2008, the WHO refers the widest number of suicides occur in the age group 15 - 29, while the lowest in the 80+ although representing as well the one with the highest rate (per 100,000) of all age groups, with 27.8 suicides and 60.1 for females and males respectively. In 2015 the reported global age-standardized rate is 10.7 per 100,000.

Social norms play a significant role in the development of suicidal behaviors. Late 19th century's sociological studies recorded first ever observations on suicide: with statistics of the time at hand, sociologists mentioned the effects of industrialization as in relations between new urbanized communities and vulnerability to self-destructive behavior, suggesting social pressures have effects on suicide. Today, differences in suicidal behavior among different countries can be significant.

=== Themes ===
Suicide rates (per 100,000) by WHO region in 2015, 2012 and 2008
WHO region (approx % of world pop)	Age-standardized (2015) (Note: To proportion and compare the prevalence of suicide for different countries, WHO adjusts for age (age-standardization) every country's crude mortality rate based on demographic parameters and general mortality data (life expectancy) including other relevant statistical data such as median population ages, sex ratios and age distribution (i.e. age-groups), enhancing cross-national comparability. Another way to think of it, is that since populations age structures are often very different, but the likelihood of dying by suicide is generally increased with age, in order to avoid masking the sensible differences given by each country's age distributions, countries' rates are reciprocally weighted into the overall trend to globally frame national suicide rates, and the epidemiological prevalence of suicide. Age-standardization works over time as a measure of the prevalence of suicide across diversely populated countries, by rounding down when populations are composed of a higher percentage of older people compared to the "standard" population, and vice versa.)	Crude (2015)	Male:Female (2015)	Rate (2012)	Male:Female (2012)	Rate (2008)	Male:Female (2008)
Europe (13%)	11.9	15.7	3.7 : 1	12.0	4.1 : 1	14.2	4.0 : 1
South Eastern Asia (26%)	13.3	13.3	1.3 : 1	17.7	1.6 : 1	15.6	1.5 : 1
Western Pacific (26%)	9.1	10.2	1.2 : 1	7.5	0.9 : 1	12.6	1.3 : 1
Americas (13.5%)	9.1	9.9	3.3 : 1	6.1	3.6 : 1	7.9	3.6 : 1
Africa (13%)	12.8	7.4	2.0 : 1	10.0	2.5 : 1	6.4	2.2 : 1
Eastern Mediterranean (8.5%)	4.3	3.9	1.8 : 1	6.4	1.4 : 1	5.6	1.1 : 1
World (100.0%)	10.7	10.7	1.7 : 1	11.4	1.9 : 1	11.6	1.8 : 1

- 2003 – "Suicide Can Be Prevented!"
- 2004 – "Saving Lives, Restoring Hope"
- 2005 – "Prevention of Suicide is Everybody's Business"
- 2006 – "With Understanding New Hope"
- 2007 – "Suicide prevention across the Life Span"
- 2008 – "Think Globally, Plan Nationally, Act Locally"
- 2009 – "Suicide Prevention in Different Cultures"
- 2010 – "Families, Community Systems and Suicide"
- 2011 – "Preventing Suicide in Multicultural Societies"
- 2012 – "Suicide Prevention across the Globe: Strengthening Protective Factors and Instilling Hope"
- 2013 – "Stigma: A Major Barrier to Suicide Prevention"
- 2014 – "Light a candle near a Window"
- 2015 – "Preventing Suicide: Reaching Out and Saving Lives"
- 2016 – "Connect, Communicate, Care"
- 2017 – "Take a Minute, Change a Life"
- 2018-2020 – "Working Together to Prevent Suicide"
- 2021-2023- "Creating Hope Through Action"
- 2024 - "Changing the Narrative on Suicide"

=== Priorities ===
SDG region (Note: Crude suicide rates (per 100,000) by SDG region. Note: Countries are included in more than one SDG region.)	Rate (2015)	Male:Female (2015)	Rate (2010)	Male:Female (2010)	Rate (2005)	Male:Female (2005)	Rate (2000)	Male:Female (2000)
Europe (Note: Aland Islands, Albania, Andorra, Austria, Belarus, Belgium, Bosnia and Herzegovina, Bulgaria, Croatia, Czechia, Denmark, Estonia, Faroe Islands, Finland, France, Germany, Gibraltar, Greece, Guernsey, Holy See, Hungary, Iceland, Ireland, Isle of Man, Italy, Jersey, Latvia, Liechtenstein, Lithuania, Luxembourg, Malta, Monaco, Montenegro, Netherlands, Norway, Poland, Portugal, Republic of Moldova, Romania, Russian Federation, San Marino, Sark, Serbia, Slovakia, Slovenia, Spain, Svalbard and Jan Mayen Islands, Sweden, Switzerland, The former Yugoslav Republic of Macedonia, Ukraine, United Kingdom of Great Britain and Northern Ireland.)	17.4	3.8 : 1	19.6	4.0 : 1	22.9	4.1 : 1	24.2	4.0 : 1
Northern America and Europe	16.5	3.6 : 1	17.6	3.8 : 1	19.5	3.9 : 1	20.3	3.9 : 1
Northern America (Note: Bermuda, Canada, Greenland, Saint Pierre and Miquelon, United States of America.)	14.7	3.2 : 1	13.2	3.4 : 1	12.0	3.4 : 1	11.4	3.6 : 1
Australia and New Zealand (Note: Australia, Christmas Island, Cocos (Keeling) Islands, Heard Island and McDonald Islands, New Zealand, Norfolk Island.)	13.5	2.8 : 1	12.6	2.9 : 1	12.4	3.0 : 1	13.2	3.5 : 1
South-eastern Asia (Note: Lao People's Democratic Republic, Singapore, Timor-Leste, Brunei Darussalam, Cambodia, Indonesia, Malaysia, Myanmar, Philippines, Thailand, Viet Nam.)	13.2	2.3 : 1	13.6	2.3 : 1	14.7	2.2 : 1	14.7	2.0 : 1
Southern Asia (Note: Afghanistan, Bangladesh, Bhutan, India, Iran (Islamic Republic of), Maldives, Nepal, Pakistan, Sri Lanka.)	13.2	1.2 : 1	13.6	1.2 : 1	14.7	1.1 : 1	14.7	1.2 : 1
Central Asia and Southern Asia	13.2	1.2 : 1	13.5	1.2 : 1	14.7	1.1 : 1	14.7	1.2 : 1
Oceania (Note: American Samoa, Australia, Christmas Island, Cocos (Keeling) Islands, Cook Islands, Fiji, French Polynesia, Guam, Heard Island and McDonald Islands, Kiribati, Marshall Islands, Micronesia (Federated States of), Nauru, New Caledonia, New Zealand, Niue, Norfolk Island, Northern Mariana Islands, Palau, Papua New Guinea, Pitcairn, Samoa, Solomon Islands, Tokelau, Tonga, Tuvalu, United States Minor Outlying Islands, Vanuatu, Wallis and Futuna Islands.)	11.5	2.8 : 1	10.7	2.8 : 1	10.8	2.9 : 1	11.7	3.2 : 1
Central Asia (Note: Kazakhstan, Kyrgyzstan, Tajikistan, Turkmenistan, Uzbekistan.)	11.4	3.5 : 1	13.1	3.9 : 1	15.3	4.6 : 1	14.8	4.4 : 1
Eastern Asia	11.1	1.1 : 1	12.8	1.0 : 1	13.3	1.0 : 1	14.2	0.9 : 1
Eastern Asia and South-eastern Asia	9.6	1.2 : 1	10.9	1.1 : 1	11.3	1.1 : 1	12.2	1.0 : 1
Small Island Developing States	9.5	3.3 : 1	9.3	3.1 : 1	9.2	3.0 : 1	10.5	2.9 : 1
Landlocked developing countries	8.0	2.4 : 1	8.7	2.4 : 1	9.7	2.5 : 1	10.1	2.4 : 1
Sub-Saharan Africa	7.5	2.0 : 1	7.7	1.9 : 1	8.0	1.9 : 1	8.5	1.8 : 1
Latin America and the Caribbean	7.1	3.5 : 1	6.5	3.4 : 1	6.4	3.4 : 1	6.5	3.6 : 1
Least Developed Countries	6.6	1.7 : 1	6.8	1.6 : 1	7.3	1.5 : 1	7.7	1.6 : 1
Oceania excluding Australia and New Zealand	5.9	2.7 : 1	5.9	2.5 : 1	5.5	2.4 : 1	5.8	2.2 : 1
Western Asia	5.1	2.7 : 1	5.5	2.8 : 1	5.1	3.0 : 1	4.8	3.1 : 1
Western Asia and Northern Africa	4.7	2.7 : 1	5.0	2.6 : 1	4.9	2.6 : 1	4.8	2.6 : 1
Northern Africa	4.3	2.7 : 1	4.4	2.4 : 1	4.7	2.2 : 1	4.8	2.0 : 1
Global	10.7	1.74 : 1	11.5	1.66 : 1	12.3	1.65 : 1	12.9	1.65 : 1

Suicide prevention's priorities, as declared on the 2012 World Suicide Prevention Day event, are stated below:

- We need to continue to research suicide and non-fatal suicidal behaviour, addressing both risk and protective factors.
- We need to develop and implement awareness campaigns, with the aim of increasing awareness of suicidal behaviours in the community, incorporating evidence on both risk and protective factors.
- We need to target our efforts not only to reduce risk factors but also to strengthen protective factor, especially in childhood and adolescence.
- We need to train health care professionals to better understand evidence-based risk and protective factors associated with suicidal behaviour.
- We need to combine primary, secondary and tertiary prevention.
- We need to increase use of and adherence to treatments shown to be effective in treating diverse conditions; and to prioritise research into effectiveness of treatments aimed at reducing self-harm and suicide risk.
- We need to increase the availability of mental health resources and to reduce barriers to accessing care.
- We need to disseminate research evidence about suicide prevention to policy makers at international, national and local levels.
- We need to reduce stigma and promote mental health literacy among the general population and health care professionals.
- We need to reach people who don't seek help, and hence don't receive treatment when they are in need of it.
- We need to ensure sustained funding for suicide research and prevention.
- We need to influence governments to develop suicide prevention strategies for all countries and to support the implementation of those strategies that have been demonstrated to save lives.

=== Factors ===
Follows a brief summary of key quotes on the subject of suicide from different sources:

"The main suicide triggers are poverty, unemployment, the loss of a loved one, arguments and legal or work-related problems [..] Suicide results from many complex sociocultural factors and is more likely to occur during periods of socioeconomic, family and individual crisis (e.g. loss of a loved one, unemployment, sexual orientation, difficulties with developing one's identity, disassociation from one's community or other social/belief group, and honour). [..] In richer countries, three times as many men die of suicide than women do, but in low- and middle-income countries the male-to-female ratio is much lower at 1.5 men to each woman. [..] In the United States, males are four times more likely to die from suicide than are females. However, females are more likely to attempt suicide than are males. [..] The disparity in suicide rates has been partly explained by the use of more lethal means and the experience of more aggression and higher intent to die [..] in men than women."

"In much of the world, suicide is stigmatized and condemned for religious or cultural reasons. In some countries, suicidal behavior is a criminal offence punishable by law. Suicide is therefore often a secretive act surrounded by taboo, and may be unrecognized, misclassified or deliberately hidden in official records of death. [..] Stigma, particularly surrounding mental disorders and suicide, means many people thinking of taking their own life or who have attempted suicide are not seeking help and are therefore not getting the help they need. The prevention of suicide has not been adequately addressed due to a lack of awareness of suicide as a major public health problem and the taboo in many societies to openly discuss it. [..] Raising community awareness and breaking down the taboo is important for countries to make progress in preventing suicide."

Physical and especially mental health disabling issues such as depression, are among the most common of the long list of complex and interrelated factors, ranging from financial problems to the experience of abuse, aggression, exploitation and mistreatment, that can contribute to the feelings of pain and hopelessness underling suicide. Usually substances and alcohol abuse also play a role. Prevention strategies generally emphasize public awareness towards social stigma and suicidal behaviors.

== Country-based information ==
Suicide rates (per 100,000) in 2015 (Note: Recently revised (April 2018) data is available at World Health Organization's website, including rates for year 2016.)
Country	Crude rate	Age-adjusted rate	Male:Female ratio
Sri Lanka	35.3	34.6	4.4 : 1
Lithuania (Note: High-income country.)	32.7	26.1	5.8 : 1
(South Korea) Republic of Korea	32.0	24.1	2.7 : 1
Guyana	29.0	30.6	3.0 : 1
Mongolia	28.3	28.1	5.2 : 1
Kazakhstan	27.5	27.5	5.0 : 1
Suriname	26.6	26.9	3.3 : 1
Belarus	22.8	19.1	6.5 : 1
Poland	22.3	18.5	6.7 : 1
Latvia	21.7	17.4	6.6 : 1
Hungary	21.6	15.7	3.7 : 1
Slovenia	21.4	15.0	4.1 : 1
Angola	20.5	25.9	2.7 : 1
Belgium	20.5	16.1	2.6 : 1
Russia	20.1	17.9	5.7 : 1
Ukraine	20.1	16.6	4.6 : 1
World	10.7	10.7	1.7 : 1

World map of 1978-2008 suicide rates showing lack of information from many African countries

In 1999, death by self-inflicted injuries was the fourth leading cause of death among aged 15–44, in the world. In a 2002 study it was reported the countries with the lowest rates tend to be in Latin America, "Muslim countries and a few Asian countries", and noted a lack of information from most African countries (see map). Data quality is to date a concern for suicide prevention policies. Incidence of suicide tends to be under-reported and misclassified due to both cultural and social pressures, and possibly completely unreported in some areas. Since data might be skewed, comparing suicide rates between nations can result in statistically unsound conclusions about suicidal behavior in different countries. Nevertheless, the statistics are commonly used to directly influence decisions about public policy and public health strategies.

Of the 34 member countries of the OECD, a group of mostly high-income countries that uses market economy to improve the Human Development Index, South Korea had the highest suicide rate in 2009. In 2011 South Korea's Ministry of Health and Welfare enacted legislation coinciding with WSPD to address the high rate.

In 2008 it was reported that young people 15–34 years old in China were more likely to die by suicide than by any other mean, especially young Chinese women in rural places because of "arguments about marriage". By 2011 however, suicide rate for the same age group had been declining significantly according to official releases, mainly by late China's urbanisation and migration from rural areas to more urbanised: since the 1990s indeed, overall national Chinese suicide rate dropped by 68%.

According to WHO, in 2009 the four countries with the highest rates of suicide were all in Eastern Europe; Slovenia had the fourth highest rate preceded by Russia, Latvia, and Belarus. This stays within findings from the start of the WSPD event in 2003 when the highest rates were also found in Eastern European countries. As of 2015 the highest suicide rates are still in Eastern Europe, Korea and the Siberian area bordering China, in Sri Lanka and the Guianas, Belgium and few Sub-Saharan countries.

According to WHO's Mental health Atlas released in 2014, no low-income country reported having a national suicide prevention strategy, while less than 10% of lower-middle income countries, and almost a third of upper-middle and high-income countries had. Focus of the WSPD is the fundamental problem of suicide, considered a major public health issue in high-income and an emerging problem in low and middle-income countries. Among high-income countries (besides South Korea) highest rates in 2015 are found across some Eastern European countries, Belgium and France, Japan, Croatia and Austria, Uruguay and Finland.

Estimated numbers and rates of suicide by income group, 2012
Income group (% of global pop)	Suicides (in thousands)	Global %	Rate	Male:Female
High-income (18.3%)	197	24.5%	12.7	3.5 : 1
Upper-middle-income (34.3%)	192	23.8%	7.5	1.3 : 1
Lower-middle-income (35.4%)	333	41.4%	14.1	1.7 : 1
Low-income (12.0%)	82	10.2%	13.4	1.7 : 1
Global (100.0%)	804	100.0%	11.4	1.9 : 1

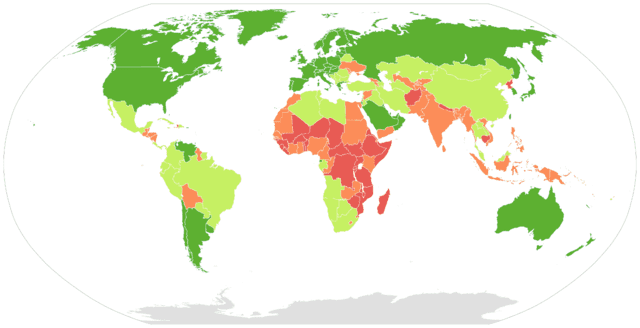
Countries by income group

Socioeconomic status plays an important role in suicidal behavior, and wealth is a constant with regard to Male–Female suicide rate ratios, being that excess male mortality by suicide is generally limited or nonexistent in low- and middle-income societies, whereas it is never absent in high-income countries (see table).

Suicidal behavior is also subject of study for economists since about the 1970s: although national costs of suicide and suicide attempts (up to 20 for every one suicide) are very high, suicide prevention is hampered by scarce resources for lack of interest by mental health advocates and legislators; and moreover, personal interests even financial are studied with regard to suicide attempts for example, in which insights are given that often "individuals contemplating suicide do not just choose between life and death ... the resulting formula contains a somewhat paradoxical conclusion: attempting suicide can be a rational choice, but only if there is a high likelihood it will cause the attempter's life to significantly improve." In the United States alone, yearly costs of suicide and suicide attempts are comprised in 50-100 billion dollars.

The United Nations issued "National Policy for Suicide Prevention" in the 1990s, which some countries also use as a basis for their assisted suicide policies. Nevertheless, the UN noted that suicide bombers' deaths are seen as secondary to their goal of killing other people or specific targets and the bombers are not otherwise typical of people committing suicide.

According to a 2006 WHO press release, one-third of worldwide suicides were committed with pesticides, "some of which were forbidden by United Nations (UN) conventions." WHO urged the highly populated Asian countries to restrict pesticides that are commonly used in failed attempts, especially organophosphate-based pesticides that are banned by international conventions but still made in and exported by some Asian countries. WHO reports an increase in pesticide suicides in other Asian countries as well as Central and South America. It is estimated that such painful failed attempts could be reduced by legalizing controlled voluntary euthanasia options, as implemented in Switzerland.

As of 2017, it is estimated that around 30% of global suicides are still due to pesticide self-poisoning, most of which occur in rural agricultural areas in low- and middle-income countries (consisting in about 80% world population). In high-income countries consisting of the remaining 20% world population most common methods are firearms, hanging and other self-poisoning.

== Gender and suicide ==
Male:Female ratios of suicide rates. Green means higher prevalence of male suicides. Below are the male and female standardised suicide rates used to derive the ratios. No data Less than 1.0 : 1 Less than 1.7 : 1 Less than 3.0 : 1 Less than 4.0 : 1 Above (or equal to) 4.0 : 1

European and American societies report a higher male mortality by suicide than any other. According to most recent data provided by WHO, about 40,000 females of the global three hundred thousand female suicides and 150,000 males of the global half million male suicides, deliberately take their own life every year in Europe and the Americas (consisting of about thirty percent world population). As of 2015, apart from a few South and East Asian countries home to twenty percent of world population, Morocco, Lesotho, and two Caribbean countries, because of changing gender roles suicide rates are globally higher among men than women.

Even though women are more prone to suicidal thoughts than men, rates of suicide are higher among men. On average, there are about three male suicides for every female one – though in parts of Asia, the ratio is much narrower. (WHO, 2002)

The disparity in suicide rates has been partly explained by the use of more lethal means and the experience of more aggression and higher intent to die, when suicidal, in men than women. (IASP, 2012)

There are many potential reasons for different suicide rates in men and women: gender equality issues, differences in socially acceptable methods of dealing with stress and conflict for men and women, availability of and preference for different means of suicide, availability and patterns of alcohol consumption, and differences in care-seeking rates for mental disorders between men and women. The very wide range in the sex ratios for suicide suggests that the relative importance of these different reasons varies greatly by country and region. (WHO, 2012)

In western countries men are about 300% or thrice as likely to die by suicide than women, while a few countries (counting over a hundred million residents overall) exceed the 600% figure. Most considerable difference in male–female suicide ratios is noted in countries of the former Soviet Bloc and in some of Latin America.

Globally, in 2015 women had higher suicide rates in eight countries. In China (almost a fifth of world population) women were up to 30% more likely than men to commit suicide and up to 60% in some other South Asian countries: overall South Asian (including South-Eastern Asia, a third of world population) age-adjusted ratio however, was around global average of 1.7 : 1 (men being around 70% more likely than women to die by suicide).

Some suicide reduction strategies do not recognize the separate needs of males and females. Researchers have recommended aggressive long-term treatments and follow up for males that show indications of suicidal thoughts. Studies have also found that because young females are at a higher risk of attempting suicide, policies tailored towards this demographic are most effective at reducing overall rates.

Shifting cultural attitudes about gender roles and social norms, and especially ideas about masculinity, may also contribute to closing the gender gap: social status and working roles are assumed to be crucial for men's identity.

== See also ==
- American Foundation for Suicide Prevention
- Campaign Against Living Miserably (CALM)
- International Association for Suicide Prevention
- List of countries by suicide rate
- National Survivors of Suicide Day
- 988 (telephone number)
- National Suicide Prevention Lifeline
- National Suicide Prevention Week
- Samaritans (charity)
- Self-injury Awareness Day
- Suicide prevention
- Suicide crisis
- Suicide Prevention Action Network USA
