= Intention (film) =

- Theatrical release poster
- Hangul: 그날, 바다
- Lit.: That day, the sea
- RR: Geunal, bada
- MR: Kŭnal, pada
- Directed by: Kim Ji-young
- Written by: Kim Ji-young
- Produced by: Choi Jin-ah; Oh Hee-jung
- Distributed by: Atnine Film
- Release date: April 12, 2018
- Running time: 110 minutes
- Country: South Korea
- Language: Korean
- Budget: US$844,380

Intention (Korean: 그날, 바다) is a 2018 documentary film directed by Ji-young Kim, who also directed the follow-up investigation, Ghost Ship. The film focuses on the South Korean government's involvement in and cover up of the 2014 Sewol ferry disaster. It features scientific analyses and testimonies from survivors to reveal the cause of the sinking, which resulted in the deaths of 304 of the 476 people on board, most of whom were high school students. Kim proves that much of the government-released data made available to the public was faked. Survivors indicated that there was governmental pressure to change their testimonies about the sinking to fit a different, inaccurate narrative for the disaster. Kim proves that there was collusion between government entities to not only conceal that the ship's sinking was not accidental, but also cover up the fact that the Korean Coast Guard failed to rescue passengers. Intention reveals the corruption within the government of Park Geun-Hye, the South Korean president who was impeached in 2017, and notably focuses attention on the National Intelligence Service (NIS). The film is narrated by actor Jung Woo-sung.

The film was released in South Korea on 12 April 2018 and quickly broke the country's box-office record for a political-current affairs documentary.

== Film content ==
In Director Ji-young Kim's documentary, he seeks to reveal the truth about the sinking of the Sewol, an incident that has not been resolved as of 2024. He identifies the failures of the South Korean administration run by Park Geun-hye and the influence of the National Intelligence Service as being critical components in the disaster. Kim examines the corruption and cover-up of the Sewol Ferry sinking, as well as the suffering of the victims' families in the aftermath. The film is divided up into chapters that address the various aspects of his investigation.

=== Chapter 1: The Evidence Of An Accident: Is It Genuine? ===
Since most of the available coverage at the time of the Sewol's sinking focused on the Coast Guard's failed rescue, Director Kim's team gathered the information given out by the government's Police-Prosecution Joint Investigation Team. The government's case is laid out in this first chapter. The prosecutor's office indicated that the accident occurred because of a sharp right turn and the listing of the ferry's cargo. Old, faulty equipment, poorly secured cargo, a company (Chonghaejin) that focused on profit over safety, and a badly trained captain and crew were blamed for the accident. However, when Director Kim began to delve into the government-released Automatic Identification System (AIS) data, he found that it was suspicious. Ou-Joon Kim, a journalist with a popular news podcast in South Korea, noted that the AIS tracking chart for the Sewol was missing important data. Channel A, an unrelated news agency, reported that the AIS signals for Sewol were missing from the early morning hours of April 16 (about 3:46 am). The news outlet released this information to the public on April 16, the night of the sinking. However, the following day, the government released the supposedly missing data. The missing data was said to have been taken from a local station, the Mokpo VTS center. However, when the documentary team examined the government-released data, they found that there was still missing information at the point where the Sewol made a sharp turn. Journalist Ou-Joon Kim (Journalist Kim) asked if this tampering with the AIS tracking information was an attempt to conceal the ship's path.

==== CNN Interview ====
Part of the CNN Interview with Ye-Shik Moon, the Captain of the Doola Ace, is shown. Paula Hancocks, a CNN reporter, interviewed Captain Moon shortly after the accident. During the interview, Moon notes that the Sewol made a slow, sharp turn and its AIS system was turned off. However, despite the fact that Moon noted the AIS tracking system was off, and therefore, not sending any data to be recorded at a VTS center, the government did release additional data after the CNN report. The Ministry of Oceans and Fisheries(MOF) also indicated the Sewol's AIS data had been saved at the Mokpo VTS station. This was suspicious, since the Sewol's AIS system was off: the Mokpo station could not have the data because none had been sent from the Sewol.

==== Radar Data from Seogeocha Island ====
The radar tower on Seogeocha Island (Seogeochado) reported the Sewol's location data to the Jindo VTS station. The radar data from this station was not immediately available to the public, but was sent two months after the disaster. An investigation of this new data showed that there were straight white lines on the chart that paralleled the Sewol's supposed trajectory on the day of the accident. It was during this data analysis process that Director Kim found that the Sewol had not followed a straight-line course throughout its travel, but rather, experienced several "zigzags" in its motion.

==== Testimony of the Captain and Surviving Crew Members ====
Captain Joon-Seok Lee, Helmsman Joon-Ki Cho, and Third Mate Han-Gyeol Park gave testimony indicating that the ship had been traveling on a straight-line path before the sudden turn. These statements matched the government's reported AIS track data for the Sewol. Director Kim considered this an odd mismatch, and so investigated the bow angle of the ship on the day of the accident.

==== Bow Angle and Engineering ====
In an interview with the Coast Guard that occurred on April 16, 2014, shortly after the accident, Chief Engineer Ki-Ho Park mentioned that he shut down the engine of the vessel after the ship listed. Park also stated that the bow of the ship was facing (north) toward the island of Byeongpungdo when the engine and turn stopped. At this time, the ship was floating along with the tide. This testimony also matches the government-reported AIS tracking data. However, Director Kim's team found that the speed data from the AIS chart actually indicated that the ship's engines were still on, and the ship was moving at a speed of 10 knots at the time the engineer reported the ship's engines had been killed.

==== The Motion of the Sewol During the Accident ====
Physics professor Doo-Jae Park evaluated the speed and nature of the turn, determining that Sewol's track from the government's AIS chart was not possible at 10 knots. This mismatch revealed that there were additional problems with the government's AIS data. Director Kim examined footage taken from the cell phone of the Doola Ace's engineer, Jeong-Yun Kim, when the ship approached the Sewol after its sharp turn. He compared it with the video footage of the Sewol taken by CNN and the AIS data from the government. The AIS data from the government showed that the Sewol was adrift and facing the island of Byeongpung. The CNN footage showed that the Sewol was adrift, but with the island of Byeongpung behind it. A further analysis showed that the bow of the Sewol was pointing away from Byeongpung Island at 9:15 am. The inertia of the turn caused the ship to turn, so Byeongpung Island was actually to the back of the Sewol.

==== The New Track Chart ====
A new track chart created by the South Korean Navy's radar was issued to the National Assembly in October 2014. The Navy chart included the odd zigzag pattern in the Sewol's travel path noted by Director Kim. Several sharp turns appear on the Navy data. Director Kim examined the Sewol's track using the Navy chart, and he realized that the ship might have been in trouble prior to entering the Maenggol Channel. According to the track data, Sewol made a sudden turn about 20 minutes prior to the accident. It is not possible to have such different track points for the Sewol's supposed trajectory. However, the government's investigation team explained the incorrect AIS data as evidence of an accident. In the first trial, the court concluded that "The AIS track chart serves as the conclusive evidence in understanding the movements of the Sewol." In December 2014, Director Kim and his team needed to stop work on the documentary due to a lack of funding. They were being paid by individuals to create the documentary. They also lacked access to other critical types of information that could move the documentary forward.

=== Chapter 2: The Truth Uncovered by the Special Investigation Commission ===
In Seoul, there were massive protests over the Sewol incident. The Special Investigation Commission (SIC) to investigate the Sewol Ferry accident was launched by the government, but it had no legal power to either investigate the disaster or prosecute those found guilty of it. In September 2015, the investigation began.

==== Irregularities in the Testimonies ====
The SIC examined the joint investigation team of the police and prosecutor's office and the crew. The issue was when the accident actually occurred (around 8:49 or 8:50?). The film includes the recorded statement of Sewol's Chief Engineer, Ki-Ho Park, who said the ship had listed prior to entering the Maenggol Channel. A group of survivors talked about an incident that occurred at around 8:30 am, which did not match the government's timeline of the accident. Sewol's Oiler Young-Jae Lee's recorded statement indicates that when he was in the engine control room, the ship was shaking and a small refrigerator tipped over sometime between 8:25 and 8:30 am. However, in the follow-up interviews with the prosecution team, the time was definitely changed to 8:50 am. First Mate/Engineer Ji-Tae Sohn sent text messages to his wife indicating that he had been "interrogated all night" and was going to be interviewed again by the National Intelligence Service (NIS). He made a suicide attempt the following day. Sohn initially said that at a little after 8:26 am, he heard a loud noise and went out to see what was happening. The engines had stopped and the ship was listing 15 degrees. The crew that was on duty came up to meet him as he went down to the engine room. All of the government reports say the time was 8:50 am.

==== The SIC and the Blue House ====
In April 2016, then-president Geun-Hye Park said that continuing the Sewol investigation was too expensive. In September 2016, the SIC was dissolved.

=== Chapter 3: The Key to the Mystery ===
In January 2015, work began again on the documentary. People donated to pay for the film's expenses, and the victims' families lent their support by giving Director Kim's investigation team access to critical materials.

==== Raw AIS Data ====
The raw AIS data for the Sewol's track was written in ASCII. The MOF only sent the navigation data to the government. The new data points formed the rest of the Sewol's track, and this information was what many analysts used to interpret what happened to the Sewol. However, Director Kim used the raw data in ASCII format. He found irregularities in this information. He explained that there are two kinds of data: the first group starts with a number 1 and the second group starts with a number 3. Kim found that prior to entering the Maenggol Channel, the data for the AIS began with a 1. But then the data beginning with a 3 appeared whenever the ship made a sudden turn; this matched with the radar track chart submitted by the Navy. A control device engineer, Seong-bok Choi, confirmed what Director Kim and his team guessed, which was that the normal motion of the vessel generated a normal message starting with 1. A special message was generated every time the ship made the sudden movement, yielding AIS data points starting with a number 3. Kim referred to this data that begins with a 3 as a "special message".

==== The Sewol's Movements as Given by the Raw AIS Data ====
The team determined that the data preceded by a number 3 could either be from an abrupt turn of the ship or from a "radical speed change." The Sewol had a lower speed limit of 14 knots and an upper speed limit of 23 knots. Anything outside of this range was considered abnormal for the ship. (Whenever the ship went straight and was within the normal speed range, the data started with 1.) When the Sewol's speed either went at or below 14 knots or at or above 23 knots, the AIS transponder generated a special message starting with a 3. Choi provides Kim and his team with a document from the International Telecommunication Union (ITU; Technical Characteristics for an Automatic Identification System Using Time Division Multiple Access in the VHF Maritime Mobile Frequency Band, M Series, Mobile, radiodetermination, amateur and related satellite services; Recommendation ITU-R M.1371-5; 2/2014; 37:13). The document assisted with their interpretation of the AIS data.

==== Understanding the AIS Data ====
The AIS data showed how often Sewol sent data every minute, and the investigators found that at any speed below 14 knots, outside of the normal operating range, the AIS data was sent six times a minute. When the Sewol was traveling at a normal range of speed between 14 knots and 23 knots, the AIS data was being sent ten times a minute. However, the data was sent at a rate of 30 times a minute when the ship went over 23 knots. The investigators could therefore understand Sewol's exact speed at any given time using the number of times the data was reported per minute. The AIS data is a "dialogue" between machines. The four letter code is the communication state, signaling how many times a minute the data is being sent.

==== Sewol Trajectory Analysis ====
Director Kim and his team examined the Sewol's data in light of this new information. The Sewol was operating in the normal speed range at 8:17 am on April 16, 2014. At 8:19 am, the speed fell under 14 knots, and triggered a change in the data. At 8:27 am, the ferry passed between two islands at a low speed outside the normal operating range (6 knots). At 8:30 am, the ship turned sharply. The 4 letter code at the end of the AIS data indicates if the data was faked. This is because the navigation data and the codes at the end of the data are programmed to tell the same information. For example, if someone changes the speed information at the beginning of the code, the code at the end of the information piece can still show that the speed was slow. (Originally, the Sewol track was missing data, but the government later released this data. The AIS tracking system on Sewol was turned off at 3:40 am, so there was no report.) The government said that Sewol turned sharply at a speed above 14 knots. If this were true, the AIS system was programmed to send a special message every two seconds. Director Kim and his team analyzed the April 15 data when Sewol had to make a sharp turn at Palmi Island, Incheon. This data met the AIS rules for correctness. When the team analyzed the data from the Sewol's final turn, however, they found that none of the data matched the AIS rules. The data from the government could not have been made by the AIS program.

==== The Second Special Investigation Committee Hearing ====
During the Second SIC Hearing on March 28, 2016, the High Commissioner of the SIC, Young-bin Kwon, asked if there was something unusual about the Sewol's AIS data. The director of the GMT Research Institute (a government AIS network administrative agency) admitted that "a lot of the data from that time looked strange, including the time stamps and duplicate positions."

=== Chapter 4: From Incheon to the Last Island ===
Troubling AIS data appeared shortly after the Sewol turned out of the port at Incheon. At around 1:50 am on the 16th, a special message in the AIS data was triggered in the waters off of Gunsan when the speed of the Sewol shot above 23 knots, indicating that the crew must have increased the engine power if the tide was not responsible for the gain, and another sharp turn message appears in the data. Hee-Geun Seo, one of the survivors of the sinking, noticed the sudden list to the left before the ship righted itself. The MOF data submitted to the National Assembly showed the data for 1:50 am, but left out about 30% of the original data in its decoding. By excluding this data, the government's analysis covered up the fact that the AIS information was being sent at a rate of 30 times a minute, which would have shown that the Sewol's speed at this time was over 23 knots and out of its normal operation range. The MOF data showed that the speed of the ship was only 17 knots. At around 4:00 am on April 16, the government's AIS servers in Daejeon (far inland) stopped recording all AIS data. At 4:11, however, the speed of the Sewol was reported as below 14 knots. At 5:00 am, the speed reportedly increased and then slowed again at around 5:50 am. The pattern repeated itself, and so the report rate for the AIS data followed this pattern. At 7:00 am, Sewol entered the Dadohae area near Uido, and a series of special messages occurred for the next 30 minutes (54 messages).

==== Interview of Students Who Survived the Sinking ====
Only 75 students from Danwon High School were rescued. During a mass interview, the children shout out that the ship's movements in the morning were "violent" at around 7:00 am. They call out that between 7 and 7:30 am, there was a violent list of the ship. This was assumed to be the time when Sewol passed between two islands, Uido and Maemuldo.

==== Analysis of the Video Footage from the Sewol ====
The video footage from the Sewol was salvaged almost two months after the sinking, so there is little footage available that can prove the speed of the ferry. The Sewol's CCTV Digital Video Recorder (DVR) was recovered. There is no data from the 7-7:30 am time slot, or data from before that time. The Sewol's CCTV may have been turned off.

==== The Third SIC Hearing ====
In the third SIC hearing, the CEO of the CCTV DVR Company, Hyeon-Cheol Shin, is told by an SIC member that if the screen was on, then the recording device must have also been on and saving the data. The CEO confirmed this as a fact. Footage from three other channels on the Sewol was found for April 16, at 7:05 am, showing people suddenly running to look out over the side of the ferry, a man waking up from sleep, and another man in a track suit rushing on deck. All turn towards the port side bow of the ship. Director Kim concluded that there was either a sound or shock to the port bow.

==== Sewol's Sudden List After 8 AM on April 16, 2014 ====
At around 8:15, the Sewol's speed dropped to 6 knots, outside the normal range again, and it began to make a left turn. Between 8:24-8:32 am, 10 special messages were generated, and survivor testimony indicates there was a sudden listing of the ship. Professor of physics, Doo-Jae Park, indicates that with the information they have, it would be challenging to conclude the reason for the turn was anything other than an external force. Additionally, the force needed to turn the ferry in this fashion could not have resulted from the ferry's own navigational equipment. Seung-Min Lee, one of the Danwon students who did not survive, sent a text message at 8:34 am: "The ship is rocking like hell." In a witness interview, a staff member from Danwon High School indicated that a call came in between 8:30 and 8:40 am from a concerned parent, who said her child called her to say that the Sewol was rocking severely. Shortly after the parent's call, a call came to the office from a student, who also said that the Sewol was rocking.

==== The Final Part of the Journey ====
When the Sewol came into sight of Byeongpung Island, its speed became erratic before there was a message for a sharp turn. Survivors testified that the ship was rocking. Lorry driver Eun-Su Choi was on the right side deck of the ship on the third floor. He indicated that the ship turned to the left side very abruptly. Do-Young Kim, another third floor passenger, said it felt like someone was "jamming on the brakes". He indicated the ship turned to the port side and the starboard side lifted up, and so his initial thought was "We must have hit something". When the Sewol was salvaged, there appears to be no damage to the bottom part of the hull that could have caused a list like that described by survivors. Survivors talked about a sound or shock in the port bow of the ship. The evidence indicated that the front part of the ship had been pulled repeatedly by an object.

=== Chapter 5: The Last Puzzle ===
Director Kim and his team visited Jukdo Island in the Maenggol Channel to examine where the Sewol sank. This island was passed by the Sewol at about 8:30 am. They followed the Navy's track chart for the Sewol and sailed out towards Byeongpung Island. It was at this point that Director Kim realized that Captain Moon from the Doola Ace was in the best position to talk about the Sewol, since he was there when the ferry ran into trouble. Moon's nautical chart is shown with some positions marked on it and revealed a serious discrepancy in the government's data and the facts: the positions marked by Moon show that the ship was actually 750 meters closer to Byeongpung Island than that reported by the MOF and 500 meters closer than the Navy radar data. During the radio communication recorded at 9:47 am on April 16, Captain Moon gave the coordinates of the Sewol. However, the Mokpo Coast Guard sent different coordinates of the Sewol to the Jeju Coast Guard via text. Director Kim investigated the control data from the Jindo VTS, which was available from the Archives of the Truth Committee and Salvage Committee of the 4/16 Sewol Families. The sinking point given by the Jindo VTS is also different from Captain Moon's data. The team then discovered that there were discrepancies in other parts of the government's track data, and that the final resting place of the Sewol matches Captain Moon's coordinates, not the government's. Director Kim concluded that all of the government data had been shifted 750 meters from the real coordinates given by the eyewitness, Captain Moon.

==== Interview with Captain Moon of the Doola Ace and Fake Government Track Charts ====
In an interview with Captain Moon of the Doola Ace, Moon noted that there were only about 4 nm (nautical miles) between the Sewol and the Doola Ace at the time of the accident (around 7.4 km). The government data, however, indicated that the Doola Ace was 11 km away. Moon indicated he was concerned about Sewol because there was a risk of collision. Survivors' testimonies about what they saw around the time of the accident confirm that the Doola Ace was spotted from the Sewol, which would have been impossible if the government's data was accurate. This information confirmed that the government-released AIS data had been faked.

==== Why Did the Government Have to Change the Position of the Doola Ace? ====
It would have taken about ten minutes for the Sewol to drift 750 meters. This movement would mean that the Doola Ace would have met the Sewol 10 minutes earlier than indicated by the government data. The actual location of the Sewol's hard turn would therefore not be able to be identified. Director Kim moved the track data down to match the coordinates Captain Moon gave, and found that the unusual listing of the ship tracked with the underwater mountainous region near the island. At 8:30 am, the ship experienced an issue that was related to the seabed configuration. The seabed rise is not high enough to have struck the Sewol, but the Sewol's anchor could have been let down from the ferry itself. The images of the Sewol taken from the Doola Ace show the right anchor is still on the Sewol, but the left one is gone.

==== The Anchors and the Undersea Mountain Range ====
Director Kim obtained maritime information about the Maenggol Channel from the Korea Hydrographic and Oceanographic Agency to examine the map of the seabed topography. The sharp turns of the Sewol's tracking data coincide with the tops of an undersea mountain range. During the SIC's investigation of the Sewol's hull (underwater) in November 2015, they found that the anchors had been cut off of the sunken vessel. The MOF claimed the anchors had been removed from the ship because they hindered the salvaging of the Sewol. In January 2016, the SIC was allowed to view the anchors that had supposedly been removed from the Sewol. However, there was no way to determine if the ones the SIC viewed were actually from the Sewol. Director Kim and his team examined photos of the Sewol's anchors from around February, 2014, when the Sewol had been repainted (including the anchors). Prior to the ship's departure on April 15, 2014, dock footage showed that the anchors were painted black. A photo taken at around 13:00 on April 16, 2014, by the Mokpo Coast Guard shows that the left anchor has peeling paint, rust, and worn edges. The right anchor cannot be seen. For anchors recently pulled from seawater, rust can form quickly, in less than an hour.

=== Chapter 6: That Day, We Witnessed the Truth ===
Korean cars and trucks typically have cameras in them. This footage was used to identify the timing of the list of the ferry. Using multiple cameras and viewpoints, Kim and his team showed that the ferry tilted 45 degrees before the vehicles on board started to slide. The evidence showed that the tilt was not caused by the vehicles tilting to one side, as indicated by the government's narrative. Calculations showed that if the cargo did shift in the way described by the government, it would have taken a long time for the ship to list in the way it did. A simulation is run showing the government's explanation of how the Sewol sank. Next, the simulation from the SIC, using the actual footage and data from the ship, is shown. The ship goes from 18 degrees to 35 degrees, taking more than 30 seconds to go from 18 degrees to 35 degrees. The listing of the ship in the government's narrative would have been slow, but the video footage shows that the actual rate was rapid: 27 degrees of tilt per second. The fast tilting of the ship pointed to an external force being applied in some fashion.

==== Bow Containers ====
The containers on the bow of the Sewol were secured with special lashing devices that can hold up to 36 tons. In the simulation of the government's theory, the containers would have turned counter clockwise as they rolled off the ship. But if the anchor pulled down the ferry, then the containers on the port side bow would have slid forward quickly, with a clockwise turn. Photos of the accident show the containers are jammed together at the front by the yellow dividing strip and they have bent surfaces, indicating they rammed into each other.

==== The Effect of a Sudden Port Side External Event ====
The physicist explains this motion using a bus analogy: if you are on a bus and it suddenly slows, you will rush to the front of the bus (inertia). He notes that the starboard side containers were not moved forward as much because the speed was not as reduced on the starboard side of the Sewol. In the external force scenario, the passengers on the starboard side of the ship would have flown forward. Evidence from survivors' testimonies indicate this is what occurred.

=== Final report ===
The physical evidence points to an anchor on the Sewol being dropped while the ship was in motion. The faked data and inaccurate information disseminated in the media and government point to corruption and collusion at the highest levels of government. It was discovered that the NIS had some involvement with the Sewol prior to its sinking. The documentary ends with video footage recovered from one of the Danwon High School student's phones, showing her and her friends having fun. None of the girls survived the sinking.
