= Maenggol Channel =

- 맹골수도 (Korean)
- Location within South Korea
- Location: Yellow Sea
- Coordinates: 34.22°N 125.89°E
- Basin countries: South Korea
- Max. length: 6 km (3.7 mi)
- Max. width: 4.5 km (2.8 mi)

The Maenggol Channel (Korean: 맹골수도; RR: maenggolsudo) or Maenggol Sudo or Maenggol Waterway is a sea channel named after the Maenggol Island south-west of the Korean Peninsula. Stretching 4.5 kilometres (2.8 mi) wide between the Geocha Archipelago and the Maenggol Archipelago and running south-east for 6 kilometres (3.7 mi), the channel has provided a shortcut for ships that try to save fuel and time.

The Maenggol Channel has one of the most rapid and unpredictable currents in the Korean Peninsula due to tidal shifts. A 2012 study estimating the prospective tidal current energy resources off the south and west coasts of Korea ranked Maenggol Channel second in South Jeolla Province only surpassed by Myeongnyang Strait that already features the Uldolmok Tidal Power Station.

In April 2014, the passenger ferry MV Sewol capsized in the Maenggol Channel north of the island Byeongpungdo, and sank off the coast of Donggeochado.
