= List of South Korean ferry disasters =

This is a list of disasters involving ferries of South Korea.

Date	Ship Name	Description	Lives Lost	Image
1953 January 5	MV Changgyeong	It was cruising from Yeosu towards Busan. 229 out of 236 passengers died due to "non-compliance with regulations: freight overload".	229	
1963 January 18	MV Yun-ho	140 out of 141 passengers died due to "non-compliance with regulations: ignored storm alert; passenger and freight overload".	140	
1970 December 14	MV Namyoung-ho	Travelling from Busan towards Jeju. 326 out of 388 passengers died due to "non-compliance with regulations: freight overload; illegal reconstruction".	326	
1993 October 10	MV Seohae	Sank near Wido island, Jeolla Province. The ship was carrying 362 passengers (141 more than its capacity) and heavy freight in bad weather.	292	
2014 April 16	MV Sewol	Capsized while carrying 476 people, mostly secondary school students from Danwon High School (Ansan City) who were travelling from Incheon towards Jeju. The ship was overloaded with 3,608 tons of cargo, more than three times its capacity of 987 tons.	304	

== See also ==
- List of maritime disasters
- List of RORO vessel accidents
