= Jodo-myeon =

- Township
- Gwanmaedo Island

- Location of Jodo-myeon in South Korea
- Coordinates: 34°17′47.6″N 126°02′51.0″E
- Country: South Korea
- Province: South Jeolla
- County: Jindo
- Administrative divisions: 23 ri

Area
  - Total: 56.96 km^{2} (21.99 sq mi)

Population (2010)
  - Total: 3,293
  - Density: 57.81/km^{2} (149.7/sq mi)
- Time zone: UTC+9 (Korea Standard Time)
- Website: jindo.go.kr

Korean name
- Hangul: 조도면
- Hanja: 鳥島面
- RR: Jodo-myeon
- MR: Chodo-myŏn

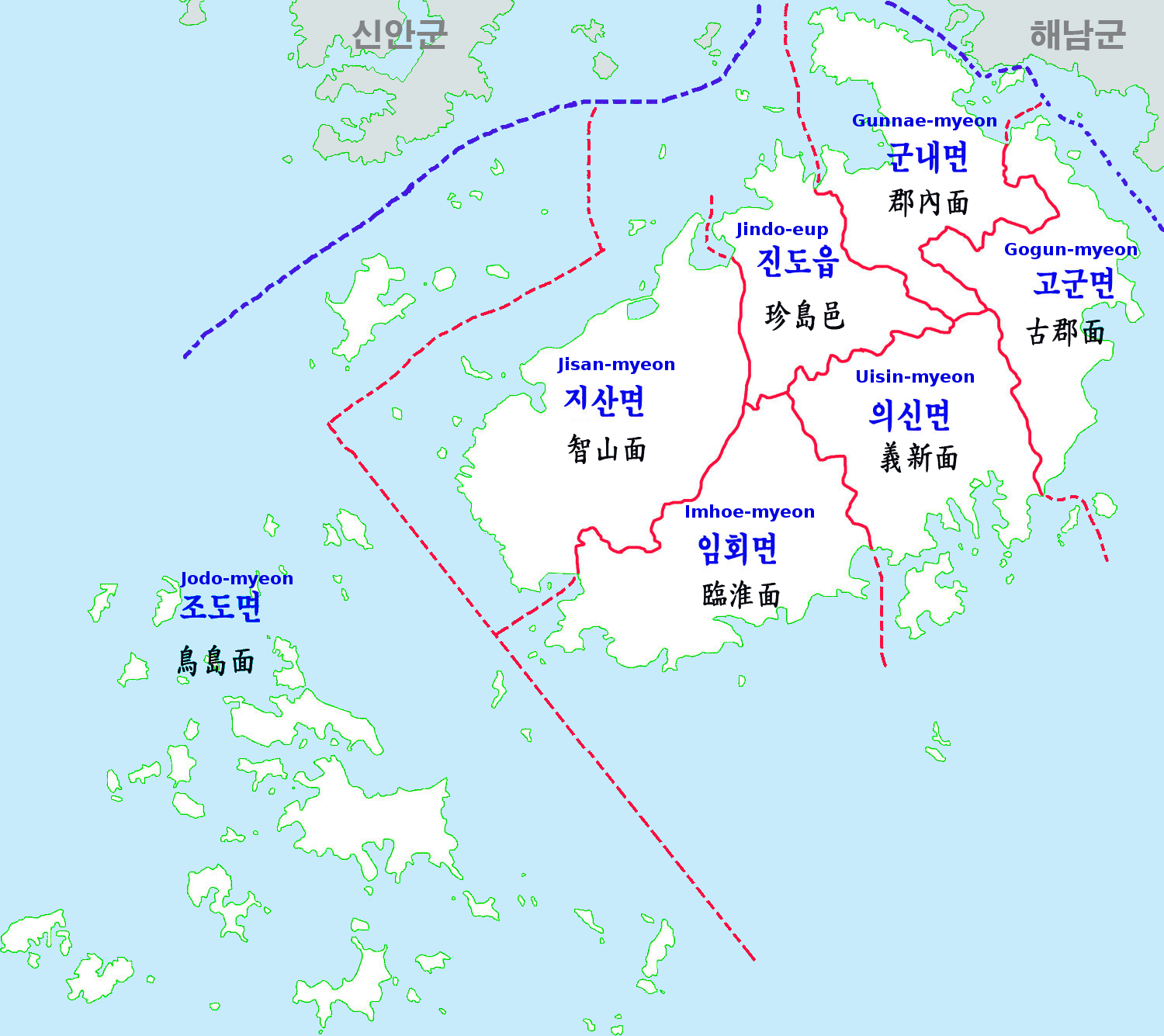
Administrative divisions of Jindo County

Jodo-myeon (Korean: 조도면) is a myeon (township) in Jindo County of South Jeolla Province, South Korea. The township office is in Changyu-ri on Hajodo (Hajo Island).

There are 177 islands (36 inhabited and 141 uninhabited islands) on the sea off Jodo-myeon. It is the largest cluster of islands in Korea. Jodogundo or Jodo archipelagoes, the six archipelagoes of Jodo, include Gasa archipelago, Seongnam archipelago, Sangjo archipelago, Geocha archipelago, Gwanmae archipelago, and Hajo archipelago.

== Administrative divisions ==
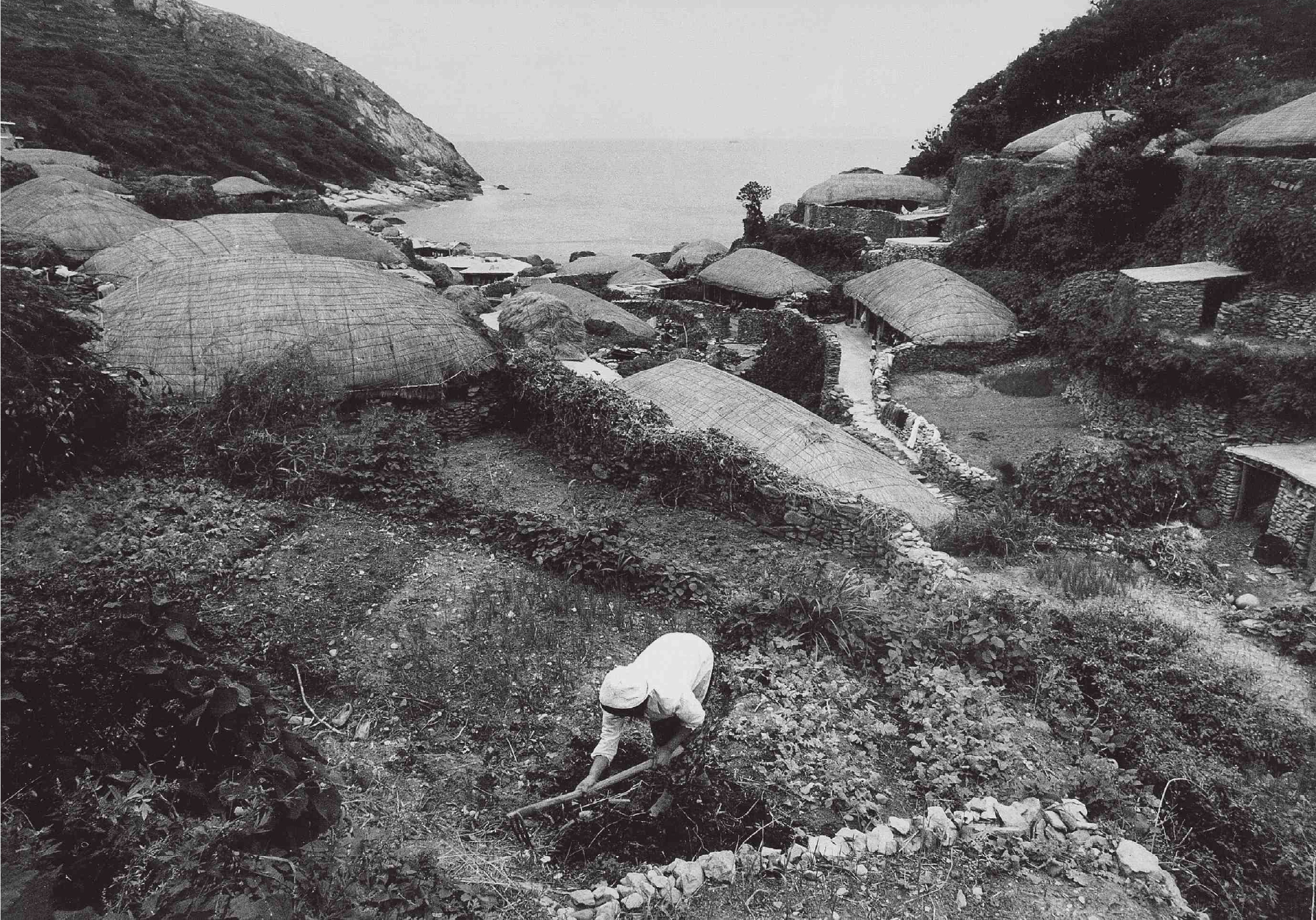
Jodo in 1972

Jodo-myeon is divided into 23 villages (ri).

Villages	Hangul	Hanja	Islands
Gwanmaedo-ri	관매도리	觀梅島里	Gwanmaedo, Gakheuldo, Hangdo, Hyeongjedo
Donggeochado-ri	동거차도리	東巨次島里	Donggeochado, Mangdo, Byeongpungdo, Bukdo, Sangsongdo, Songdo, Hasongdo
Seogeochado-ri	서거차도리	西巨次島里	Seogeochado, Sanghajukdo, Hangdo
Sinyuk-ri	신육리	新陸里	Hajodo, Suyukdo
Changyu-ri	창유리	倉柳里	Hajodo
Daemado-ri	대마도리	大馬島里	Daemado, Geomado, Sogeomado, Naehangdo, Oehangdo, Sihado
Somado-ri	소마도리	小馬島里	Somado, Gyedo, Daebuljangdo
Gwansado-ri	관사도리	觀沙島里	Gwansado, Sanjado, Jokdo, Judo
Nabaedo-ri	나배도리	羅拜島里	Nabaedo, Sonabaedo
Maengseong-ri	맹성리	孟城里	Sangjodo, Chungdo
Yeomi-ri	여미리	礖尾里	Sangjodo, Gunamdo, Baegyado, Yugeumdo
Seongnamdo-ri	성남도리	城南島里	Seongnamdo, Soseongnamdo, Sanggaldo, Hagaldo
Jukhangdo-ri	죽항도리	竹項島里	Jukhangdo
Dokgeodo-ri	독거도리	獨巨島里	Dokgeodo, Dokgeogundo, Gudo, Byeondo, Seuldo, Soseuldo, Tanhangdo, Haenggeumdo
Cheongdeungdo-ri	청등도리	靑藤島里	Cheongdeungdo, Gokdudo, Songdo, Sinuido
Modo-ri	모도리	茅島里	Modo, Somodo
Maenggoldo-ri	맹골도리	孟骨島里	Maenggoldo, Maenggolgundo
Jinmokdo-ri	진목도리	進木島里	Jinmokdo, Galmokdo, Galdo, Bukdo
Okdo-ri	옥도리	玉島里	Okdo, Gwado, Siyado, Omido
Nurokdo-ri	눌옥도리	訥玉島里	Nurokdo
Oebyeongdo-ri	외병도리	外竝島里	Oebyeongdo, Jedo
Naebyeongdo-ri	내병도리	內竝島里	Naebyeongdo, Mosado, Buksongdo
Gasado-ri	가사도리	加沙島里	Gasado, Gadeokdo, Gwangdaedo, Daesodongdo, Sosodongdo, Mado, Sangbanggudo, Jungbanggudo, Habanggudo, Songdo, Yangdeokdo, Oegongdo, Jeobudo, Jujido, Hyeoldo

== Jodo archipelagoes ==
- Gasagundo (Gasa archipelago, 가사군도): Gasado, Daesodongdo, Jujido, Yangdeokdo, Hyeoldo, Songdo, Gwangdaedo
- Seongnamgundo (Seongnam archipelago, 성남군도): Seongnamdo, Soseongnamdo, Okdo, Baegyado, Yugeumdo, Naebyeongdo, Oebyeongdo
- Sangjogundo (Upper Jodo archipelago, 상조군도): Sangjodo
- Hajogundo (Lower Jodo archipelago, 하조군도): Hajodo
- Dokgeogundo (Dokgeo archipelago, 독거군도): Dokgeodo, Seuldo, Gudo
- Gwanmaegundo (Gwanmae archipelago, 관매군도): Gwanmaedo, Cheongdeungdo
- Geochagundo (Geocha archipelago, 거차군도): Donggeochado, Mangdo, Bukdo, Sangsongdo, Hasongdo, Songdo, Seogeochado, Sangjukdo, Hajukdo, Hangdo
- Maenggolgundo (Maenggol archipelago, 맹골군도): Maenggoldo, Gwakdo, Myeongdo, Mongdeokdo, Sojukdo, Jukdo
