= Jodo (disambiguation) =

Jōdō is a Japanese martial art that uses the jō, a 4-foot-long (1.2 m) wooden staff.

Jodo may also refer to:

- Jōdo-shū, a Japanese branch of Pure Land Buddhism, distinct from the larger Jōdo Shinshū branch
- Jodo, a pen name used by Alejandro Jodorowsky
- Jodo Kast, a minor character from Star Wars who impersonated Boba Fett
- Jodo-myeon, a township in Jindo County of South Jeolla Province, South Korea
