= In the Absence =

2018 short documentary film by Seung-jun Yi

- Directed by: Seung-jun Yi
- Based on: Sinking of MV Sewol
- Production companies: 416 Documenting Group; Field of Vision (II); First Look Media; Korea Communications Agency
- Distributed by: Field of Vision (II)
- Release date: November 9, 2018 (U.S.)
- Running time: 28 minutes
- Country: South Korea
- Language: Korean

In the Absence (Korean: 부재의기억) is a 2018 South Korean–American short documentary film that depicts the sinking of the MV Sewol in 2014, in which three hundred people – mostly school children from Danwon High School – lost their lives.

== Production ==
The film was requested by the film distributor Field of Vision, who was looking for a short documentary regarding the background of the 2016 Candelight Vigil for the impeachment of then South Korean president Park Geun-hye. With guilt that he had not participated in documenting the moments of the Sewol incident as it happened, the film focused on tracing the origins of the sufferings caused by the incident. In the original version, there was a scene involving the mothers of the drowned students crying as the salvaged vessel approached the dock, but it was cut from the final version, for fear that such overwhelming reactions would prevent the audience from empathizing with the mothers. The film was produced by Gary Byung-Seok Kam and directed by Yi Seung-Jun, with Seung-Jun beginning the process of interviewing the victims families on camera in 2017. The documentary is seen as distinct from other documentaries about the disaster, due to the fact that it highlights the disaster and not just the events leading up to the event and/or those responsible for the tragedy.

== Format ==
The documentary utilizes audio from first responders and government officials, aerial video from helicopters, and cell phone video and multi-media messages from the victims of the ferry sinking to showcase the disaster in real time. The entire documentary is roughly 29 minutes long, and highlights how the disaster could have been avoided and the aftermath of the disaster such as the Candlelight Protests and the Impeachment of Park Geun-hye.

== Awards ==
The documentary was awarded the 2018 grand jury prize for short competition in DOC NYC, a documentary film festival in the United States.

In the Absence was nominated for an Academy Award for Best Documentary (Short Subject) at the 92nd Academy Awards. Before this nomination (and Parasite's nominations), no South Korean film had ever been nominated for an Oscar.

== See also ==
- Sinking of MV Sewol
- 2019 in film
