= Sinking of MV Seohae =

Sinking of a South Korean ferry in 1993

- Sinking of MV Seohae (South Korea)
- Date: October 10, 1993
- Location: Near Wido, Buan County, North Jeolla Province, South Korea
- Deaths: 292
- Injuries: 70
- On board: 362

The South Korean ferry Seohae (Korean: 서해 페리호; Hanja: 西海페리號) sank on October 10, 1993 in the Yellow Sea near Wido, Buan County, North Jeolla Province. Of those on board, 292 of the 362 passengers and crew on board were killed. Seventy people were rescued.

At the time, this sinking was the largest ferry disaster in South Korea since December 15, 1970, when 323 people on board were killed in the sinking of the ferry Namyoung (남영호).

== Vessel ==
Seohae was a ferry of 110 gross tons, with a maximum capacity of 221 passengers.

== Sinking ==
At the time of the incident, Seohae was carrying 362 people (355 passengers and seven crew), an excess of 141, and the weather condition was harsh with winds of 10 to 14 metres per second (22 to 31 mph) and wave height of 2 to 3 metres (6.6 to 9.8 ft).

Overloading was a factor in the sinking. Another was a 1 cm (0.4 in) thick rope found wrapped around both propeller shafts. The rope, left behind by fishing operations, may have made the ferry heel over onto her starboard side.

== Aftermath ==
Divers were employed to help recover the bodies of deceased victims after the vessel sank.

== See also ==
- List of South Korean ferry disasters
- Sinking of MV Sewol
