= Geochagundo =

Archipelago in South Korea

- Interactive map of Geochagundo

Geography
- Location: Yellow Sea
- Coordinates: 34.250°N 125.925°E
- Archipelago: Geochagundo
- Total islands: 10

Administration
- South Korea
- Province: South Jeolla
- County: Jindo
- Township: Jodo

Korean name
- Hangul: 거차군도
- Hanja: 巨次群島
- RR: Geocha gundo
- MR: Kŏch'a kundo

Geochagundo (Korean: 거차군도) is an archipelago in the Yellow Sea, located about 30 km (19 mi) south-west of Jindo, in the administrative divisions of Donggeochado-ri and Seogeochado-ri, Jodo-myeon, Jindo County, South Jeolla Province.

Geochagundo consists of the islands Donggeochado (동거차도), Mangdo (망도), Bukdo (북도), Sangsongdo (상송도), Hasongdo (하송도), Songdo (송도), Seogeochado (서거차도), Sangjukdo (상죽도, 웃대섬), Hajukdo (하죽도, 아랫대섬), Hangdo (항도).

On 16 April 2014, the passenger ferry MV Sewol capsized north of the nearby island Byeongpungdo, drifted north while taking in water, and sank off the coast of Donggeochado.
