= Sinking of MV Sewol =

2014 ferry sinking disaster in South Korea

- MV Sewol capsized and sinking, as taken by the Korea Coast Guard on 16 April 2014
- Native name: 세월호 침몰 사고 (Korean)
- Date: April 16, 2014 (12 years ago)
- Time: c. 08:30 – c. 10:30 (KST)
- Location: 1.5 km (0.93 mi) off Donggeochado, South Jeolla, South Korea; 34°13′5″N 125°57′0″E
- Cause: Undetermined (see Causes)
- Participants: 476 on board; 33 crew members; 443 passengers; 339 Danwon School; 325 students; 14 teachers; 104 general
- Deaths: 304 on board; 10 crew members; 294 passengers; 261 Danwon School; 250 students; 11 teachers; 33 general; 7 others; 2 rescue divers; 5 emergency workers
- Missing: 5
- Property damage: Cargo: ₩200 billion ($180 million)
- Inquest: 3 separate investigations
- Suspects: Captain and 13 crew members
- Charges: Homicide (4 including the captain); Fleeing and abandoning ship (2); Negligence (9)
- Verdict: Guilty
- Convictions: Life imprisonment (captain); 10 years (chief engineer); 18 months−12 years (13 other crew members)
- Survivors: 172

On the morning of Wednesday, 16 April 2014, the ferry MV Sewol sank while en route from Incheon towards Jeju City in South Korea. The 6,825-ton vessel sent a distress signal from about 2.7 kilometres (1.7 mi; 1.5 nmi) north of Byeongpungdo at 08:58 KST (23:58 UTC, 15 April 2014). Out of 476 passengers and crew, 304 people died in the disaster, including around 250 students from Danwon High School in Ansan. Around 82% of the Sewol's casualties were children. Out of the 172 survivors, more than half were rescued by fishing boats and other commercial vessels that arrived at the scene approximately 40 minutes before the Korea Coast Guard (KCG).

The sinking of Sewol resulted in widespread social and political reaction within South Korea. In a short-answer poll taken by The Hankyoreh in December 2014, the Sewol disaster was voted the second most important historical event in South Korea since the country's independence, behind only the Korean War. Many people criticized the actions of the ferry's captain and most of the crew. Also criticized were the ferry's operator, Chonghaejin Marine, and the regulators who oversaw its operations, along with the administration of President Park Geun-hye for her response to the disaster and attempts to downplay government culpability, and the Korean Coast Guard for its poor handling of the disaster, and the perceived passivity of the rescue-boat crew on scene. Outrage has also been expressed against the initial false reporting of the disaster by the government and South Korean media, who claimed everyone aboard had been rescued, and against the government for prioritizing public image over the lives of its citizens in refusing help from other countries, and publicly downplaying the severity of the disaster.

On 15 May 2014, the captain and three crew members were charged with murder, while the other eleven members of the crew were indicted for abandoning the ship. As part of a government campaign to manage public sentiment over the official response to the sinking, an arrest warrant was issued for Yoo Byung-eun (described as the owner of Chonghaejin Marine), but he could not be found despite a nationwide manhunt. On 22 July 2014, the police announced that a body found in a field in Suncheon, roughly 290 kilometres (180 mi) south of Seoul, was identified as Yoo.

== Background ==
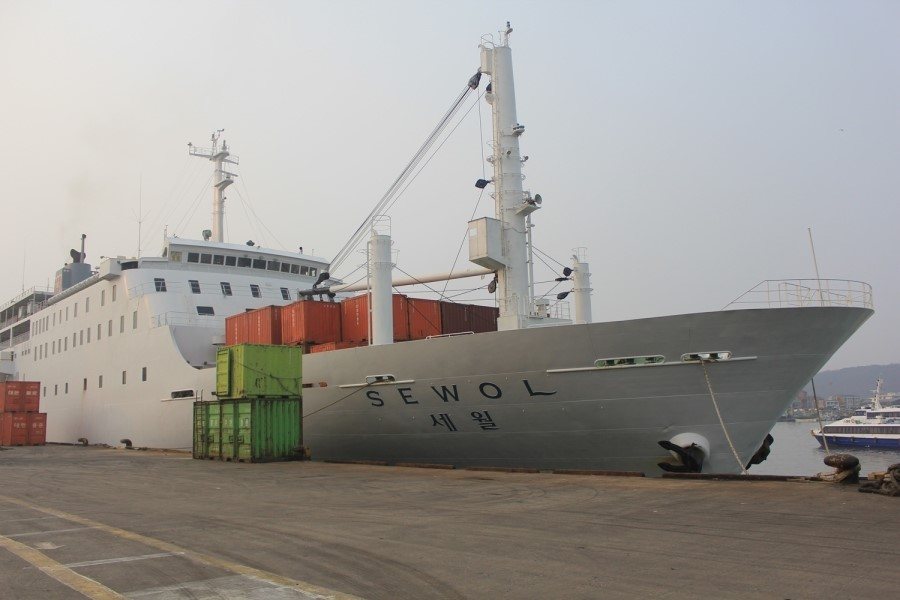
Sewol at a port in Incheon in March 2014 one month prior to the disaster, after modifications had been made

At the time of its purchase by Chonghaejin Marine on 8 October 2012, the ship that would come to be known as MV Sewol was eighteen years old and dilapidated. It was originally named Ferry Naminoue and was operated from 1994 to 2012 as a transport ship for cargo and passengers by the Japanese company A-Line Ferry. According to A-Line Ferry, it did not experience any problems during its service in Japan.

Chonghaejin modified the ship from 12 October 2012 to 12 February 2013, and registered it on 22 October 2012. The modifications included adding two decks of passenger space and expanding cargo space. Gross tonnage increased by 239 tons to 6,825 tons and passenger capacity increased by 116 people for a total of 956 passengers and crew. The modifications shifted the center of gravity up by 0.51 m (1 ft 8 in) and created a left-right imbalance. After the sinking, Korean website Daily Labor News reported that the modifications were illegal before retracting the statement.

The modified ship was inspected and certified by the Korean Register of Shipping (KR). KR reduced the maximum cargo load by 1,450 tons to 987 tons, and increased the ballast carried by 1,333 tons to 1,703 tons. The cargo limits were not known by the Korea Shipping Association, which managed ferries, or the Korea Coast Guard (KCG), which oversaw the Shipping Association. Certification included an inclining test. Sewol received its inspection certification and certification for the prevention of sea pollution on 12 February 2013. After the inspections, 37 tons of marble were added to the exhibition room at the rear of the new bridge deck. After the sinking, the Board of Audit and Inspection discovered that KR's licensing was based on falsified documents.

Sewol began operations on 15 March 2013. She made three round trips per week from Incheon to Jeju, each one-way voyage of 425 kilometres (264 mi) taking 13.5 hours to complete. On 19 February 2014, she received an interim inspection and a periodic inspection from the Register. It made 241 round trips by the day of the incident.

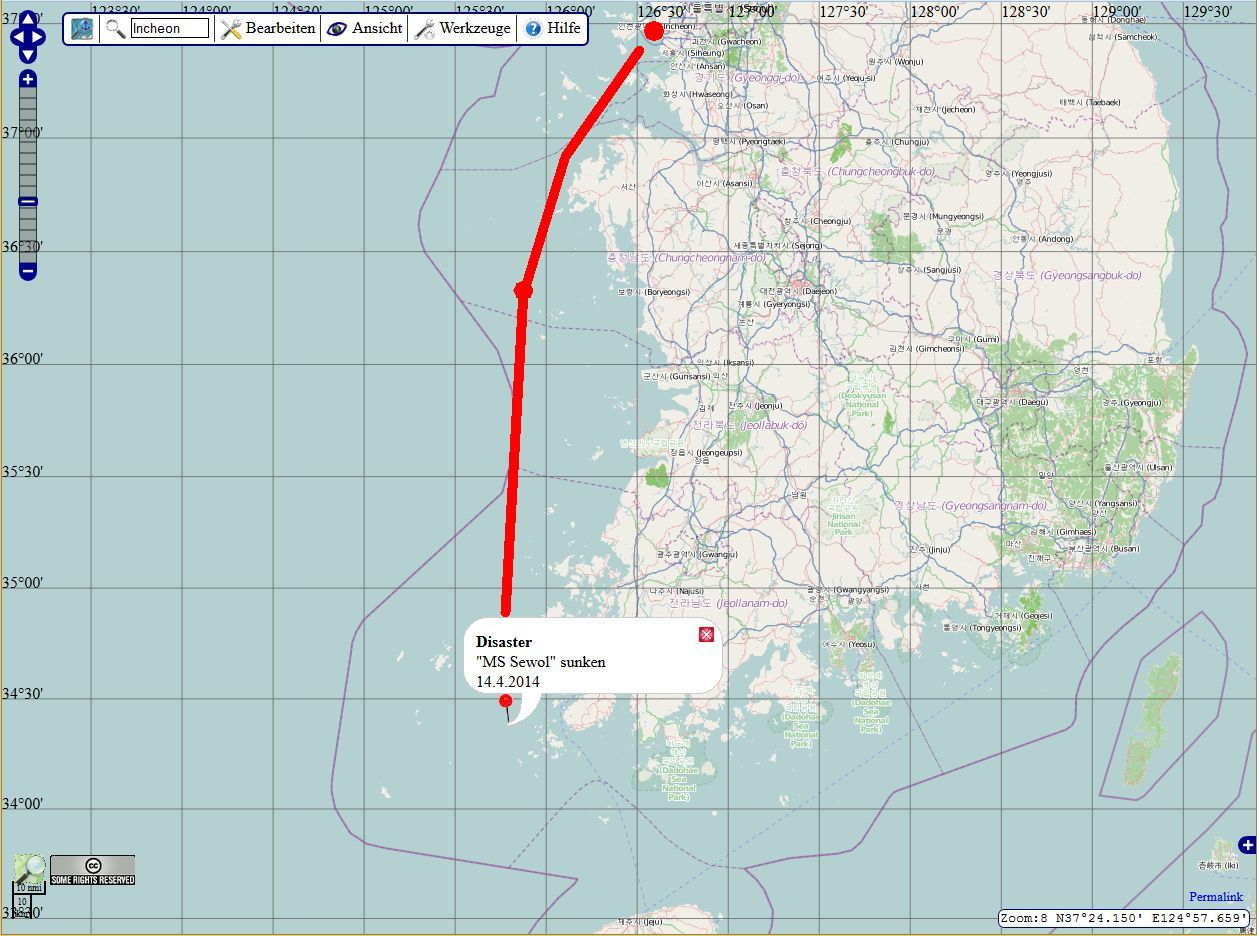
Route of Sewol during the last voyage from Incheon to Jeju, the capsizing location marked by the rectangular speech bubble

On 15 April 2014, Sewol scheduled departure from the port at Incheon at 6:30 p.m. KST. was delayed by fog, which reduced visibility to less than 1 kilometre (0.62 mi). A low visibility warning issued by the port's vessel traffic service (VTS) was in effect from around 5:30 p.m. to 8:35 p.m. During this period, the Shipping Association held Sewol's departure. The Shipping Association checked the weather conditions with the operator of the Palmido lighthouse and consulted the KCG before authorizing the ship to proceed at about 8:50 p.m. Sewol departed around 9 p.m., and was the only ship to leave port that evening.

Sewol carried 476 passengers and 33 crew members. The passengers included 325 students and 14 teachers on a field trip from Danwon High School. Five passengers were of non-Korean nationality. Nineteen crew members were irregular, part-time workers. The ship was commanded by 69-year-old Captain Lee Joon-seok, who replaced the regular captain. Lee had over forty years of experience at sea and had traveled the route before. He was hired on a one-year contract, with a monthly salary of ₩2.7 million (roughly US$2,500).

The ship also carried 2,142.7 tons of cargo - including 185 cars- which exceeded the maximum allowed 987 tons and was improperly secured. Only 761.2 tons of ballast were taken on board, the ballast tanks had not been properly maintained, and the previous voyage had been made without making further adjustments to the ballast during the journey. Shin, Sewol's regular captain, had warned Chonghaejin about the reduced stability which he attributed to the removal of the side ramp; Shin later claimed that the company threatened to fire him if his objections continued. Shin's warnings were also relayed to the Incheon Port Authority on 9 April 2014; a Chonghaejin official responded by stating that he would deal with anyone making the claims. Shin had also requested repairs for the malfunctioning steering gear on 1 April 2014, but this was not done. The KR stability test report dated 24 January 2014 stated that Sewol had become "too heavy and less stable after modifications were made".

Chonghaejin spent ₩2600 (US$2) on safety training for the crew in 2013, which was used to buy a paper certificate.

== Wednesday, 16 April 2014 ==
Passengers and crew aboard the ship on the morning of 16 April

On 16 April at 7:30 a.m. (KST), third mate Park Han-kyul and helmsman Cho Joon-ki took over the watch from the previous team. At this time, Sewol was heading at a course of about 165 degrees at a speed of about 20 knots (37 km/h; 23 mph) and was operating two radar devices. Around 8:20 a.m. when the ship was about 3–5 kilometres (2–3 nmi) from entering the Maenggol Channel, Park ordered Cho to change the steering system from autopilot to manual steering. When Sewol arrived at the channel at 8:27 a.m. at a course of around 137 degrees, the wind speed was between 4–7 metres per second (8–14 kn; 14–25 km/h), the wave height about 0.5 meters (1 ft 8 in), and the visibility was good.

The Maenggol Channel has strong currents, which necessitate extreme caution when steering a ship through it. At the time of the incident, conditions were calm and Sewol was following a route that was frequently used. While the wider areas of the channel contain rock hazards and shallow waters, they were not in the immediate vicinity of the ship's usual path. While prosecutors and some news organizations labeled Park as being inexperienced based on her unfamiliarity with the channel, the Korean Maritime Safety Tribunal's investigation report noted that she had on multiple occasions passed through the channel on another ship.

As Sewol approached the fatal turn, breakfast was being served in the cafeteria. CCTV data taken at 8:40 a.m. showed students present and socializing on the deck. One surviving passenger, Choi Eun-seun, recalled having gone up to the deck to smoke right before the incident.

=== Multiple turns to the right (08:48) ===
External videos
- Video of Sewol sinking
- Videos from inside the ship as it sank

Right before the incident, Park and Cho were standing side by side near the ship's wheel at the bridge. Captain Lee was absent from the bridge at the time. At 8:46 a.m., as Sewol was travelling at a speed of 18 knots (33 km/h; 21 mph) at a course of around 136 degrees, Park ordered Cho to change the course from 135 degrees to 140 degrees, which Cho consequently undertook.

The accounts of what happened next are conflicting. According to Park's testimony, after she had used the radar to check that Sewol's course was changed and the new course was set to 140 degrees, she ordered Cho to change the course of the ship further to 145 degrees. The order was given at 8:48 a.m. After realizing that the ship was heavily listing to starboard, which led the bow to turn to the right, she gave an order to turn the wheel to port. Immediately after giving the order, she heard Cho exclaim, "The wheel isn't working" in a flustered voice, after which the ship started listing.

Cho's testimony did not notably differ from that of Park. He testified that the listing began with the order to turn to 140 degrees. According to Cho, he only received the order to change the course to 140 degrees, and not the order to change the course to 145 degrees. As Sewol kept turning towards the right even as he was holding onto the wheel, he made two turns to the left amounting to a five-degree turn. As the ship did not stop its rightward turning, it was eventually facing a 145-degree course. Cho testified that Park gave an order to turn "in the opposite direction" at this point, which he followed by turning the ship further to the left by ten degrees, so the total amount of the turn became fifteen degrees to the left.

The court came to the conclusion that Cho's steering led the ship to attempt a fifteen-degree turn for forty seconds. The court concluded that Cho, who was flustered by the ship turning faster than expected while he was following Park's order to turn to 145 degrees, was attempting to turn to the left when he took Park's order to mean a turn in the opposite direction. This led him to make a turn to the right, causing the front of the ship to rapidly turn right.

==== Effects of the turn ====
A Ministry of Oceans and Fisheries analysis of Sewol's track chart discovered that the ship's Automatic Identification System (AIS) did not collect data for a 36 second period from 8:48:37 to 8:49:13. The failure was initially attributed to a power outage. Huh Yong-bum, the head of the expert advisory panel on the police-prosecution joint investigation team, later testified that the AIS failure was due to system limitations and that it did not affect the steering.

According to the joint investigation team, Sewol's sharp turn was a combined result produced by the steering error and the lessened restoring force caused by overloading; however, investigations did not show any malfunctions with the generator or the battery. From 8:49:26, AIS data showed the ship's angular velocity accelerated from 0.29 degrees per second (dps) to 0.83, 1.00, and 2.00 until 8:49:39; these readings were consistent with previous testing data gained from earlier tests conducted on an empty Sewol. Consequently, the ship herself listed twenty degrees into the water at 8:49:40, causing cargo to fall to one side of the ship. The impact caused the ship's gyroscope to erroneously record angular velocities of 15 dps at 8:49:40, 14 dps the next second, and minus 11 dps the following second. Given that the shifted cargo effectively compounded the destabilizing effect, the ship tilted ten degrees further into the water. Passengers also reported hearing a loud "bang".

As Cho sharply turned the ship from 135 to 150 degrees, Sewol began to list to port and tilt towards the water. The overall effect was that the ship turned about 45 degrees to the right, then rotated an additional 22 degrees on the spot for a span of twenty seconds. The cargo falling to one side of the ship caused Sewol to lose all her restoring force and allowed water to flow into the ship through the side door of the cargo loading bay and the car entrance located at the stern. This scenario was confirmed by simulations separately run by the expert advisory panel on the joint investigation team, the Korea Research Institute of Ships and Ocean Engineering, and the Advanced Marine Engineering Center of Seoul National University. Cho testified that the tilting lasted for about two to three minutes after the initial tilt. During this time, Oh Yong-seok, an off-duty helmsman who was sleeping in his cabin, was awoken when he was thrown against its port side. As of 8:50 a.m., Sewol was leaning thirty degrees to port.

Captain Lee, who was in his private cabin at the time of the incident, immediately rushed to the bridge. After a short period, all the ship's mates and helmsmen arrived there as well. Around this time, Cho stopped the engines, although it is unknown whether it was on his own volition or following an order from Lee. At 8:50, Cho ordered an evacuation of the engine room through a call to the assistant engineer. During this time, Park was crying, as she was startled by the sudden incident; this lasted until at least 9:06 a.m. With the engines off, Sewol became unable to change directions and began drifting sideways. A passenger later testified that lights went out after the ferry started listing.

=== Calls for rescue (8:52–9:30) ===
Important Announcement repeated during capsizing

Do not move. Just stay where you are. It's dangerous if you move, so just stay where you are.

— As reported by CNN on 16 April

As Sewol began sinking, the ferry's intercom system started ordering the passengers to stay put, alleging that moving was dangerous. The announcements were made by a communication officer, Kang Hae-seong, who had not consulted the manual before the broadcast. The announcements began broadcasting by at least 8:52 a.m. and continued even when water began flooding passenger compartments. Other crew members corroborated this order, instructing passengers to stay put. Captain Lee also instructed passengers to stay put and did not change the order even as he himself was leaving the ship.

The first emergency call was made by Choi Duk-ha, a Danwon High School student aboard the ferry. At 8:52 a.m., he called the national emergency service number and reported to the South Jeolla Province fire station that Sewol had begun to capsize. Choi was connected to the Mokpo Coast Guard at 8:54 a.m. and was asked to give the latitude and longitude of the ship's location. Three minutes later, the Mokpo Coast Guard station situation room ordered Patrol Vessel No. 123 to be dispatched to the scene; the vessel was launched at 8:58 a.m. Following the Coast Guard search and rescue manual, the boat was to be in charge of surveying the area and "swiftly" rescuing passengers. Choi did not survive the capsizing and was later found dead.

At 8:55 a.m., Sewol's crew made their first distress call to the Jeju VTS and asked them to notify the KCG, as the ferry was rolling and in danger. At 8:56 a.m., the Jeju VTS called the Jeju Coast Guard. Three minutes later, the Jeju Coast Guard called the Mokpo Coast Guard and discovered that a patrol boat had already been dispatched. At 9:01 a.m., a crew member on Sewol called the Incheon branch of Chonghaejin to report the situation, and Chonghaejin's head office located in Jeju then called Captain Lee at 9:03 a.m. for a report of the situation. The Incheon branch then talked with the first mate in five telephone calls over the next thirty-five minutes.

At 9:06 a.m., the Jindo VTS were informed of the capsizing incident by the Mokpo Coast Guard. Around this time, Sewol's crew began communicating with the Jindo VTS, which was closer to their location. For the next two minutes, Jindo VTS alerted two other ships that Sewol was sinking, with one confirming that it had visual contact with the ship. At 9:07 a.m., the ferry's crew confirmed that she was capsizing and requested the help of the KCG. At 9:14 a.m., the crew stated that the ship's angle of heel made evacuation impossible. Around this time, the captain of Patrol Vessel No. 123 was appointed the commander of the scene. Four minutes afterwards, the crew of Sewol reported to the VTS that the ferry had heeled more than fifty degrees to port.

At 9:23 a.m., the VTS ordered the crew to inform the passengers to wear life jackets. When the crew replied that the broadcasting equipment was out of order, the VTS told them to personally order the passengers to wear life jackets and more clothing. At 9:25 a.m., the VTS asked Captain Lee to decide quickly whether to evacuate the ship, stating that they did not have enough information to make the decision. When Lee inquired about the rescue, the VTS replied that patrol boats were due to arrive in ten minutes and a helicopter in one minute. Lee then replied that there were too many passengers for the helicopter. During this time, Lee told passengers to stay in their cabins. The communications officer, using the ship's intercom, repeatedly ordered passengers not to move.

At 9:33 a.m., after confirming that nearby ships had volunteered to help in the rescue operations, the VTS told all ships to drop lifeboats for the passengers. At 9:38 a.m., all communications were cut off between the VTS and Sewol. About three minutes after all communications were cut, about 150 to 160 passengers and crew jumped overboard.

=== Captain and crew ===
During Sewol's capsizing, members of the crew drank beer and communicated by telephone with staff from Chonghaejin at seven different times. As passengers stayed in their cabins as instructed, Captain Lee and most of his crew abandoned the ship. Lee, Cho, and the first and second mates were the first people to be rescued, with Captain Lee rescued around 9:46 a.m.

=== Passengers ===
As Sewol capsized, some passengers followed the announcements to stay put, even as the water came in. Most of the student passengers obeyed the announcements. Some passengers, who disobeyed the announcements, climbed to the top of the ship or jumped into the water and were rescued.

Videos recording passengers during the capsizing have been recovered. Some recorded the announcements telling passengers to stay in place and put on life jackets, while some showed passengers joking around, putting on life jackets, and sending farewells.

Passengers made calls, sent text messages, or sent KakaoTalk mobile messages during the capsizing. The last message was sent at 10:17 a.m. Text messages and social media posts allegedly made by survivors still trapped after the capsizing circulated in the media, but an investigation by the Cyber Terror Response Center found that none of the trapped passengers used their phones between noon on 16 April and 10:00 a.m. of 17 April and that all the reported survivors' messages made within that time were falsified.

Sewol took two and a half hours to sink. By around 11:18 a.m., the stern was submerged, with a section of the hull about 2 metres (6 ft 7 in) high and 20 to 30 metres (66 to 98 ft) long showing above the water. At 12:00 noon on 18 April, only 50 centimetres (20 in) of the bulbous bow was above water; at 1:03 p.m., the ship was completely submerged.

== Rescue operations ==
An investigation conducted by Social Disaster Special Investigation Committee clearly confirmed that the Coast Guard Command was responsible for the lives of 304 people. In a position with clear duties and authority according to their laws and operation procedures, the Coast Guard Command should have mobilized all available resources to grasp the situation and identify the emergencies with the Sewol ferry, providing direction to the mobilized forces to evacuate the Sewol ferry passengers. However, they failed to carry out these actions. The Coast Guard Command neither tried to figure out the specific status of the Sewol nor shared the information already secured (through passenger reports, etc.) with dispatchers. Even though they should have been aware of the urgency of the Sewol ferry incident based on the information provided by the mobilized forces and the passenger reports, the Coast Guard Command still did not issue the proper commands to the mobilized forces.

During the disaster and the immediate aftermath, the South Korean government's announcements, as well as those from the South Korean media, were inconsistent and inaccurate. An editorial in The Huffington Post stated that government reports were like a rubber band, "increasing at one moment and decreasing at another." South Korean outlets such as JoongAng Ilbo, Maeil Broadcasting Network, and JTBC later made corrections and apologies concerning their earlier reports. Conspiracy theories were also present in the aftermath of the sinking.

=== First day ===
At 8:58 a.m. (KST) on 16 April 2014, the Mokpo Coast Guard dispatched Patrol Vessel No. 123 in response to the first report of the incident. After receiving the news of the capsizing from the Jeollanam Provincial Government, the Republic of Korea Navy 3rd Fleet sent a Gumdoksuri-class patrol vessel (PKG) to the site at 9:03 a.m.; the Navy dispatched another PKG at 9:09 a.m. At 9:04 a.m., the government created the Central Disaster Countermeasure Headquarters (중앙재난안전대책본부), an organization which would directly report to the government. The KCG set up a rescue operations headquarters at 9:10 a.m.

Patrol Vessel No. 123 arrived at the scene near 9:30 a.m. as the first ship to reach the site after the incident. During the time between the dispatch and the operations, No. 123 failed to raise Sewol and chose to call for other ships on the radio. Consequently, crewmembers on No. 123 had not directly communicated with the stricken vessel and were not aware of the content of the communication between Sewol and the Jindo VTS on arrival. At the time of arrival, Sewol had listed about fifty to sixty degrees to port. Rescuers made announcements for five minutes, calling people to abandon ship and jump into the water. No. 123 began rescue operations at 9:38 a.m. with the dispatching of a rubber boat. Passengers who had reached the deck or jumped into the water were rescued, including Captain Lee, but rescuers could not get inside the ship due to the list. People trapped inside Sewol's pilothouse were rescued by breaking through the windows.

At 9:35 a.m., the Korean Ministry of National Defense started operating Counter-disaster Headquarters (재난대책본부). At 9:40 a.m., the Ministry of Oceans and Fisheries declared the sinking to be the highest state of emergency in terms of naval accidents; consequently, the Central Accident Response Headquarters (중앙사고수습본부) was established. At the same time, the Ministry of Health and Welfare sent emergency vehicles and the first squad of the Disaster Medical Support Team (재난의료지원팀) to Jindo. At 11:28 a.m., the Korea Navy's Ship Salvage Unit (SSU) was reported to have been deployed for the operations.

At 2:42 p.m., 150 special forces personnel from the Republic of Korea Army Special Warfare Command, including forty scuba divers, were sent for the operation. At this point, 196 personnel, including 82 in the SSU and 114 in the Republic of Korea Naval Special Warfare Flotilla, were involved in the operations. At 3:07, the regional government of the Gyeonggi Province was reported to have started operating the Prevention and Countermeasures Headquarters (재난안전대책본부). After 5 p.m., units from the SSU began undersea operations. At 5:13 p.m., the Gyeonggi-do Office of Education was reported to have started operating the Ansan Danwon High School Accident Countermeasures Report Compiling Headquarters (안산 단원고 사고대책 종합상황본부). At 8:00 p.m., operations investigating the ship's hull were ceased.

As of 10:03 p.m., the following units were involved in rescue operations: Naval forces include sailors from the 3rd Fleet (제3함대; 第三艦隊), a Dokdo-class amphibious assault ship, a Chungmugong Yi Sun-sin-class destroyer, and an Ulsan-class frigate. The Republic of Korea Air Force sent support units such as the Lockheed C-130 Hercules, Sikorsky HH-60 Pave Hawk, and HH-47 variant of the Boeing CH-47 Chinook. The Republic of Korea Army sent units including 150 Special Warfare Command soldiers and eleven ambulances.

=== Second day ===
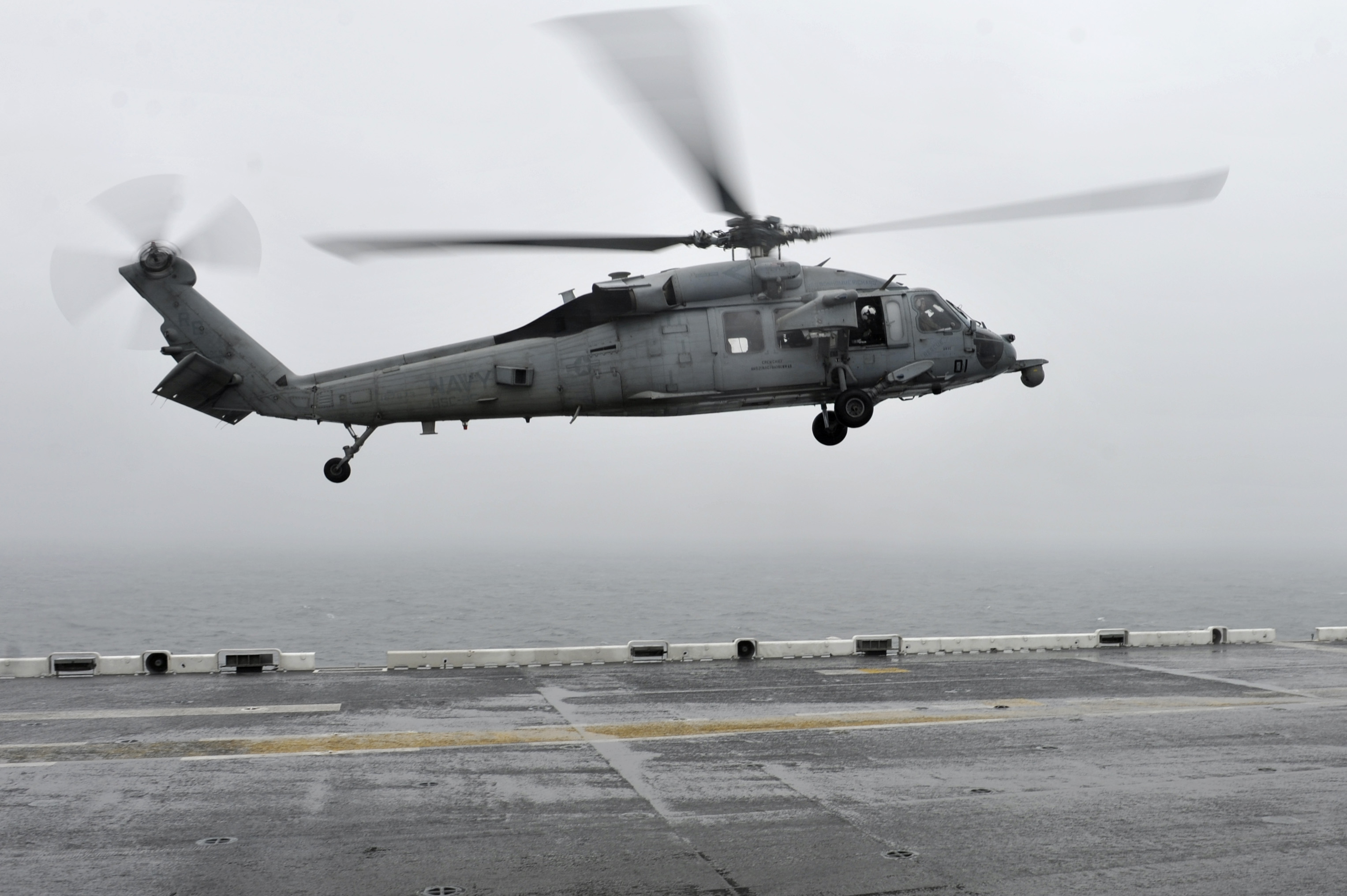
A U.S. Navy MH-60S Seahawk helicopter conducted search and rescue operations at the request of the South Korean navy near where Sewol sank, on 17 April 2014.

Starting on 17 April, Undine Marine Industries, a privately held company, began to lead the search for missing passengers. At 12:30 a.m., hull investigations were started by the KCG with the help of flares. As of 6:00 a.m., 171 ships, twenty-nine aircraft and thirty divers were involved in the rescue effort. The KCG had assigned twenty divers in teams of two. The ROK Navy also assigned eight divers, but the KCG prevented them from participating and waited for divers from Undine Industries. At 7:24 a.m., civilian groups of expert divers were reported to be helping out in the rescue operations. During the morning, the number of divers involved in the operations reached 555. The navy also established a military control tower on the Dokdo-class assault ship. Starting around 2:00 p.m., rescue operations were practically stopped due to bad weather conditions. A marine crane arrived on the scene that night.

=== Subsequent operations ===
At 10:50 a.m. on 18 April, the KCG began pumping in air to support possible air pockets. At the same time, divers entered the capsized ship's hull but only gained access to the cargo deck. The divers' entrance was later labeled a 'failure' by the Central Disaster Countermeasure Headquarters. On 19 April, a navy petty officer who was injured during rescue operations died. On 21 April, remotely operated underwater vehicles began to be used for operations. On 24 April, the CR200 'Crabster' robot was sent to the rescue site. An Undine Marine diver died on 6 May, followed by another diver's death on 30 May. On 17 July, a firefighting helicopter returning from rescue operations crashed near an apartment complex, killing all five officers aboard and injuring a high school student.

The government announced on 22 April 2015 that it had approved plans to salvage the wreckage of Sewol in hopes of finding more information about the sinking and recovering the bodies of nine victims still missing. The plan was initially put forward by President Park Geun-hye and was endorsed by the minister of public safety and security, Park In-yong. The operation was expected to take as long as eighteen months and to cost between US$91–137 million.

=== Foreign response ===
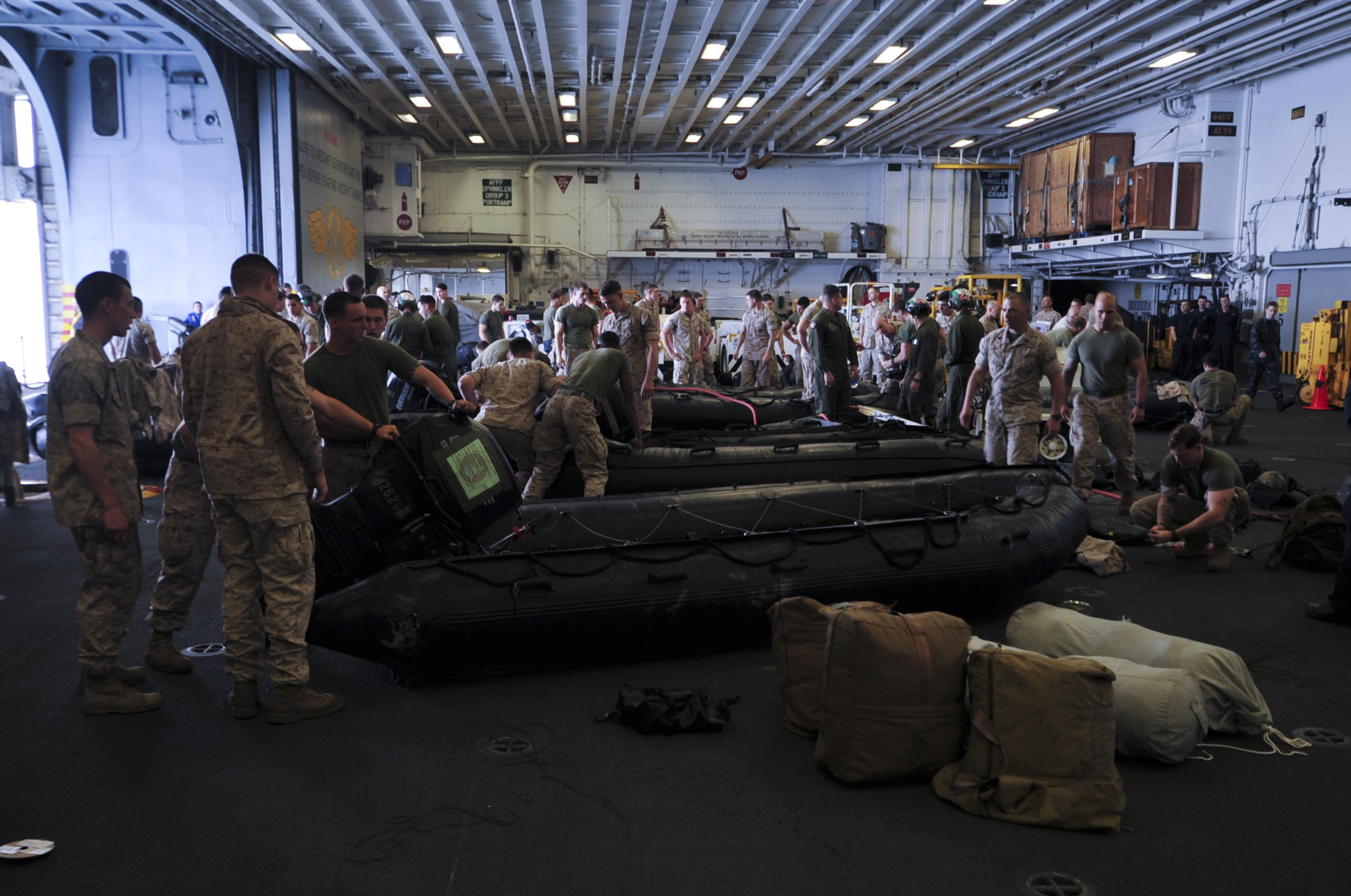
U.S. Marines assigned to the 31st Marine Expeditionary Unit responding to the scene of the Sewol sinking on 16 April 2014

The USS Bonhomme Richard was sent to assist in the air-sea rescue operation, but did not get the approval of the ROK Navy for its helicopters to participate in the rescue.

The US Navy rescue and salvage USNS Safeguard was sent to South Korea to take part in the rescue operation.

The Japan Coast Guard offered support, as well as a message of sympathy and condolences from the Japanese government. The KCG declined the offer, saying that, while the offer was welcome, special assistance was not needed on this occasion.

== Survivors and casualties ==
At 11:01 a.m., Munhwa Broadcasting Corporation began reporting that all students had been rescued; this news was re-reported by other news organizations and continued until 11:26 a.m. Around 11 a.m. KST, officers working for the educational departments for the Gyeonggi Province sent text messages to the students' parents stating that all students had been rescued. The officers' belief was apparently confirmed by a police officer in the Danwon Police Department. Initial reports stated that rescuers retrieved 368 people from cold waters as the passengers, mostly students, had jumped overboard when the vessel started sinking; the South Korean government later corrected this statement, saying 295 passengers remained missing. Twenty-two of the twenty-nine crew survived, including fifteen people responsible for the navigation.

In its 17 April morning edition, The Chosun Ilbo reported that 174 people had been rescued, four of them had died, and 284 were missing. According to CNN and its affiliate YTN, six people died. News1 Korea reported that, as of 8:00 a.m., 179 people had been rescued, six had died and 290 were missing. Three more people were found dead at 11:00 a.m. and the confirmed death toll rose to nine. At 10 p.m., Yonhap confirmed that the death toll had risen to fourteen. Over the course of the following months, the death toll rose into the hundreds. The death toll stood at 294 as of 22 July 2014, with ten missing; the date marked the recovery of the last cabin crew member.

The sinking of Sewol is the deadliest ferry disaster in South Korea since the sinking of the ferry Namyoung on 14 December 1970, which killed 326 out of the 338 people aboard.

== Investigation ==
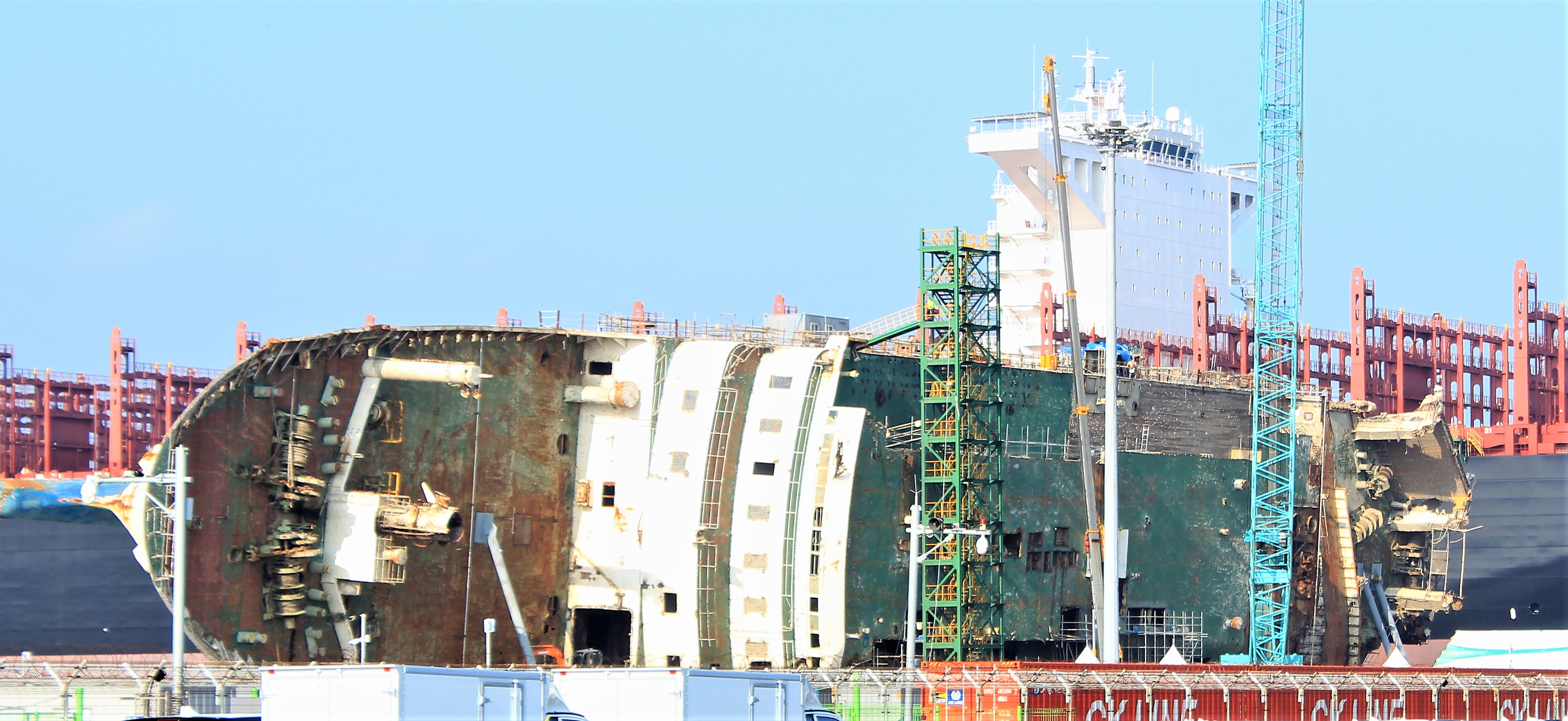
Sewol after being refloated, at Mokpo New Port

=== Causes ===
As of 13 December 2022, investigators have concluded that the cause of the sinking was undetermined. Early theories about the sinking included a range of explanations, given as follows.

An "unreasonably sudden turn" to starboard, made between 8:48 and 8:49 a.m. KST, caused the cargo to shift to port, which in turn caused the ship to list and to eventually become unmanageable for the crew. The existence of the sudden turn has been confirmed by the analysis of the ship's AIS data. The ship's crew agreed that the main cause was the sudden turn. Experts, such as Lee Sang-yun, a professor and head of the environment/maritime technology institute of the Pukyong National University, also agreed.

Overloading and improperly secured cargo were also thought to contribute to the sinking. Sewol was carrying 3,608 tons of cargo, more than three times the limit of 987 tons. It is estimated that the actual cargo on the day of the sinking weighed 2,215 tons, including 920 tons of trucks, cars and heavy equipment, 131 tons of containers and 1,164 tons of general goods. The cargo included building materials destined for naval bases on the island of Jeju. The overloading was also previously noted by Sewol's off-duty captain and the first mate; the off-duty captain reported that the ship's owners ignored his warning that she should not carry so much cargo because she would not be stable. Lee Sang-yun also proposed overloading as a cause.

Sewol was carrying only 580 tons of ballast water, much less than the recommended 2,030 tons; this would make the vessel more prone to list and capsize. The crew had reportedly pumped out hundreds of tons of ballast water from the bottom of the ship in order to accommodate the additional cargo. The combination of the lack of ballast water and excess cargo meant that the center of gravity on the Sewol was too high for safe operation and the amount of force needed to capsize the ship was reduced to a dangerously low level. The newspaper The Chosun Ilbo argued that the discharging of ballast water was a cause of the incident.

Secondary causes also contributed to the capsizing of the ferry by decreasing the restoring force. Renovations which added extra passenger cabins have been proposed as a main secondary cause by Kim Gil-soo (김길수), a professor in the maritime transport technological department at the Korea Maritime University. This possible cause has also been supported by the off-duty captain as well as Lee Sang-yun.

It was theorized that the solenoid valve became stuck, which contributed to the sharp turn. The Social Disasters Commission (SDC), an investigation team, concluded that it is highly improbable that this occurred. The SDC also concluded that it cannot confirm if the cause of the sinking was due to an external force, although there was some deformation and damage to the Sewol's hull. The investigative committee was not able to rule out other causes for the sinking. The cause of the sinking was still undetermined as of December 2022.

=== Other theories ===
==== Explosion ====
Gong Gil-young (공길영), a professor of aviation engineering at Korea Maritime University, commented that Sewol's sudden turn was simply the 'first cause' and that there were secondary causes to the incident. He advocated an explosion as the most probable secondary cause.

==== Reef collision ====
At the beginning of the investigation, the KCG thought that the cause was a collision with a reef, believing this likely because the area was foggy. Captain Lee denied this was the cause of the sinking, and a reef collision has been dismissed as a cause by consensus among experts. The theory is also not currently advocated by the KCG.

==== Collision with submarine ====
Several media outlets, such as the Jaju Sibo (Self-Reliance News) have speculated the ferry sinking to be result of crashing with a submarine. This was from discussions over a screenshot from videos of the ferry sinking, where a dark vessel was visible in sea fog behind the ship. While most media correctly identified the vessel as a fishing boat, a few have concluded this to be a military submarine of South Korean, Japanese, American, French, or Israeli origin. This theory was repeated by online vigilante group "Zaro -- Netizens' investigation team", who pointed out in a 9-hour long video that the route taken by the ill-fated ferry didn't match conventional routes, and external factors such as a submarine collision can explain the disaster. He claimed an errant sub collided with the Sewol based on his analysis of radar recordings and the Navy may have concealed the submarine crash in order to achieve its goal of sailing 2 million miles (3.2 million kilometres) without a sinking.

=== Captain and crew ===
On 19 April, Captain Lee Jun-seok was arrested on suspicion of negligence of duty, violation of maritime law and other infringements. Lee had abandoned Sewol with passengers still aboard the ferry, while South Korean law explicitly requires captains to remain on the ship during a disaster. Two other crew members, a helmsman and the third mate, were also arrested on that day on suspicion of negligence and manslaughter. By 26 April, twelve further arrests had been made with the whole crew responsible for navigation in detention.

On 15 May, Captain Lee, First Mate Kang Won-sik, Second Mate Kim Young-ho, and Chief Engineer Park Gi-ho were indicted on charges of homicide through gross negligence (also described as murder), which carry a potential death penalty. The other eleven crew members faced lesser charges of abandoning the ship and ship safety offences.

Three crew members, Park Ji-young, Jeong Hyun-seon, and Kim Ki-woong, were credited by survivors with staying aboard the ferry to help passengers escape. All three went down with the sinking vessel.

=== Operators ===
On 8 May, the chief executive of Chonghaejin, Kim Han-sik, was arrested and faced charges including causing death by negligence. Four other Chonghaejin officials were also taken into custody. The Ministry of Oceans and Fisheries revoked the company's license to operate ferries on the Incheon-Jeju Island route in May 2014.

=== Regulation ===
The Sewol disaster raised questions regarding governmental regulation of shipping in South Korea. Shipping is regulated by the Korean Shipping Association, which is also an industry trade group, something experts consider a likely conflict of interest. In addition, government regulators outside the Association frequently move to jobs as part of the association after their government service. Yun Jong-hwui, a professor at Korea Maritime and Ocean University, notes that while South Korean regulations are strong, they are often poorly enforced.

== Litigation ==
On 3 June, the Gwangju District Court issued arrest warrants for a senior vessel safety operator of the Korea Shipping Association's Incheon unit and a vessel inspector of the KR's Mokpo unit. Amongst fifteen crew accused of the sinking, prosecutors sought the death penalty for Captain Lee under the charge of homicide for failing to carry out his duty. Lead prosecutor Park Jae-eok said: "Lee supplied the cause of the sinking of the Sewol ... he has the heaviest responsibility for the accident. We ask that the court sentence him to death." While no formal pleas were made, Lee denied intent to kill. The others had lesser charges, including negligence.

On 11 November, the Gwangju District Court found Captain Lee guilty of negligence and sentenced him to thirty-six years' imprisonment. The judges said that he was clearly not the only person responsible for the tragedy and they accepted that his negligence did not amount to an intent to kill. Chief Engineer Park Gi-ho was found guilty of murder and jailed for thirty years. Thirteen other crew members were given jail sentences of up to twenty years imprisonment on charges including abandonment and violating maritime law. Relatives of victims were distraught at the verdict, with some weeping. Agence France-Presse reported that one woman screamed in the courtroom: "It's not fair! What about the lives of our children? They (the defendants) deserve worse than death!"

In the cases against officials over the overloading of cargo, Kim Han-sik, Chonghaejin's chief executive, was found guilty of negligence and received a ten-year prison term. Six other Chonghaejin employees and a Korean Shipping Association official also received prison sentences.

Following appeals by prosecutors and the accused, on 28 April 2015, Captain Lee was found guilty of murder and his sentence increased to life imprisonment, while those for fourteen other crew members were reduced to a maximum of twelve years, including ten years for Chief Engineer Park Gi-ho, whose murder conviction was overturned. Judge Jeon Il-ho explained: "We drew a distinction between the Captain Lee Joon-seok, who has a grave responsibility, and crew members who took orders from the captain." Kim Han-sik's sentence was also reduced to seven years on appeal.

== Aftermath ==
=== Government's report and concerns about public opinion ===
Based on the National Crisis Management Basic Guidelines' explicit provisions, the Blue House should have played the role of a control tower in a national crisis situation. However, this "control tower", which was absent on 16 April 2014, became active only when the public opinion toward the government worsened after the disaster. To prevent the spread of criticism of their administration, the Blue House provided misleading information to the public and took actions with the purpose of polarizing the public according to their political interests. The crisis was viewed by the Blue House as a "crisis of the regime", and in specific instances when there was a divide in public sentiment, the president and the government attacked the individuals and groups who were critical of them of being "ideologically biased" and "pro-North Korea forces", and imposed restrictions. During this process, the Blue House utilized right-wing organizations and strengthened their conservative base by providing financial support to the organizations that cooperated with them or by appointing active personnel to key positions. The Blue House did not protect the victims, but instead stigmatized them as instigated by politically aligned groups. In this way, Park Geun-hye's Blue House distorted the victims' demands, aggravated social conflict, and even hindered comprehensive fact-finding investigation efforts aimed to improve future disaster response capabilities and enact special laws.

The Social Disaster Special Investigation Committee confirmed that intelligence agencies such as the National Intelligence Service and the Defense Security Command illegally and unfairly supported the investigation and arrest operation of the Yoo Byung-eun family. At the time, the Blue House defined the Sewol ferry disaster as "a national disaster that caused suffering to the entire nation, caused by greedy expansion of wealth by the Yoo Byung-eun's family." The Blue House used the Yoo Byung-eun investigation and arrest operation as a trump card to deflect the government's responsibility for the Sewol Ferry disaster and to shift the blame onto the shipowner. The National Intelligence Service and the Defense Security Command actively supported the Blue House provisions in this matter.

On 16 November 2016, a report about the disaster, compiled by the National Intelligence Service and intended for President Park, was publicized. The report referred to the sinking as "just a ferry accident" (그저 하나의 여객선 사고) and said "we must control the protest in the name of ferry accident (여객선 사고를 빌미로 한 투쟁을 제어해야 한다)." The report makes no mention of investigating the sinking, salvaging the hull, or supporting the victims' families, instead devoted to determining ways to "control the protesting attempt by the opposition forces in the name of the ferry accident and suggest a method about public opinion manipulation using the government-organized demonstrations."

The sinking contributed to the political downfall of President Park. As criticism of her handling of the disaster grew stronger, Park's administration established a commission to monitor and prosecute her critics. Tatsuya Kato, a Japanese journalist, was indicted on charges of defamation for reporting that Park had responded to the disaster by meeting with fringe religious leader Choi Soon-sil. In 2016, the full extent of Choi's ties to Park emerged in South Korean media, which caused a corruption scandal that ultimately resulted in Park's impeachment by the National Assembly on 9 December. A unanimous Constitutional Court ruling on 10 March 2017, upheld the impeachment vote, ending her presidency.

After Moon Jae-in was elected following Park's removal from office, documents revealed that Park had made a secret blacklist of artists to be barred from receiving any sort of government acknowledgement or sponsorship. It was further discovered that the initial purpose of this blacklist was to censor those who commemorated the Sewol victims in their artwork. In July 2017, members of the Park administration were imprisoned for up to three years for their role in creating the illegal blacklist.

A subsequent investigation by the Moon administration launched in October 2017 revealed President Park spent crucial early hours of the rescue operation in her bedroom, meeting with Choi and getting her hair done before attending emergency meetings at 5pm, eight hours following the sinking. National security officials Kim Jang-soo and Kim Kwan-jin, and former presidential chief of staff Kim Ki-choon, were prosecuted on charges of manipulating the Blue House records of Park's whereabouts on the day of the sinking.

=== The Disaster and State Crime ===
The arrest of Yoo Byung-eun and the confiscation of his property were key to ending the Sewol ferry scandal according to the Defense Security Command (DSC), and a special task force was organized to apprehend Yoo. The Defense Security Command argued that monitoring civilians in Geumsuwon, as well as collecting vast amounts of personal information on members of the Evangelical Baptist Church (Salvation Sect) were considered legitimate "administrative support". However, the activities of the Defense Security Command were determined to be operations that should only be carried out by investigative agencies, thus rendering these acts illegal as they could not be categorized as administrative support under the Administrative Procedures Act. It was also confirmed that these illegal actions taken by the Defense Security Command were regularly reported to the Blue House.

The obstruction of the investigation by the Sewol Special Assistance Committee is considered to be a state crime committed deliberately and methodically. 'State crime' is a term used to describe human rights violations committed by the state itself. A government agency that was to cooperate with the Sewol Special Assistance Committee's investigation abused its authority to receive the details of the investigation, and together with the committee, used those details to hinder the investigation. Through this collusion, they were able to manipulate the situation.

=== Media representation ===
The disaster is the subject of the 2014 documentary film The Truth Shall Not Sink with Sewol. The director's cut of the film was made available for public viewing on YouTube on 31 August 2015. Two British filmmakers that were living in South Korea during the tragedy, Neil George and Matthew Root, created the documentary After the Sewol, which was released in several forms between 2016 and 2020. George later reorganized the footage into Crossroads, with Root credited only as producer, with a 38-minute cut made viewable through Asian Boss. The film uses interviews with survivors, emergency response workers, and family members of the victims along with news coverage to create a study about the conflicting reports about disaster. A separate short documentary In the Absence was created to showcase the disaster in real time, with audio, visual and multi-media messages and video from the victims. The documentary was nominated for Best Documentary Short in the 92nd Academy Awards in 2020.

The disaster was depicted in fiction in the film Birthday released in April 2019.

== Reactions ==
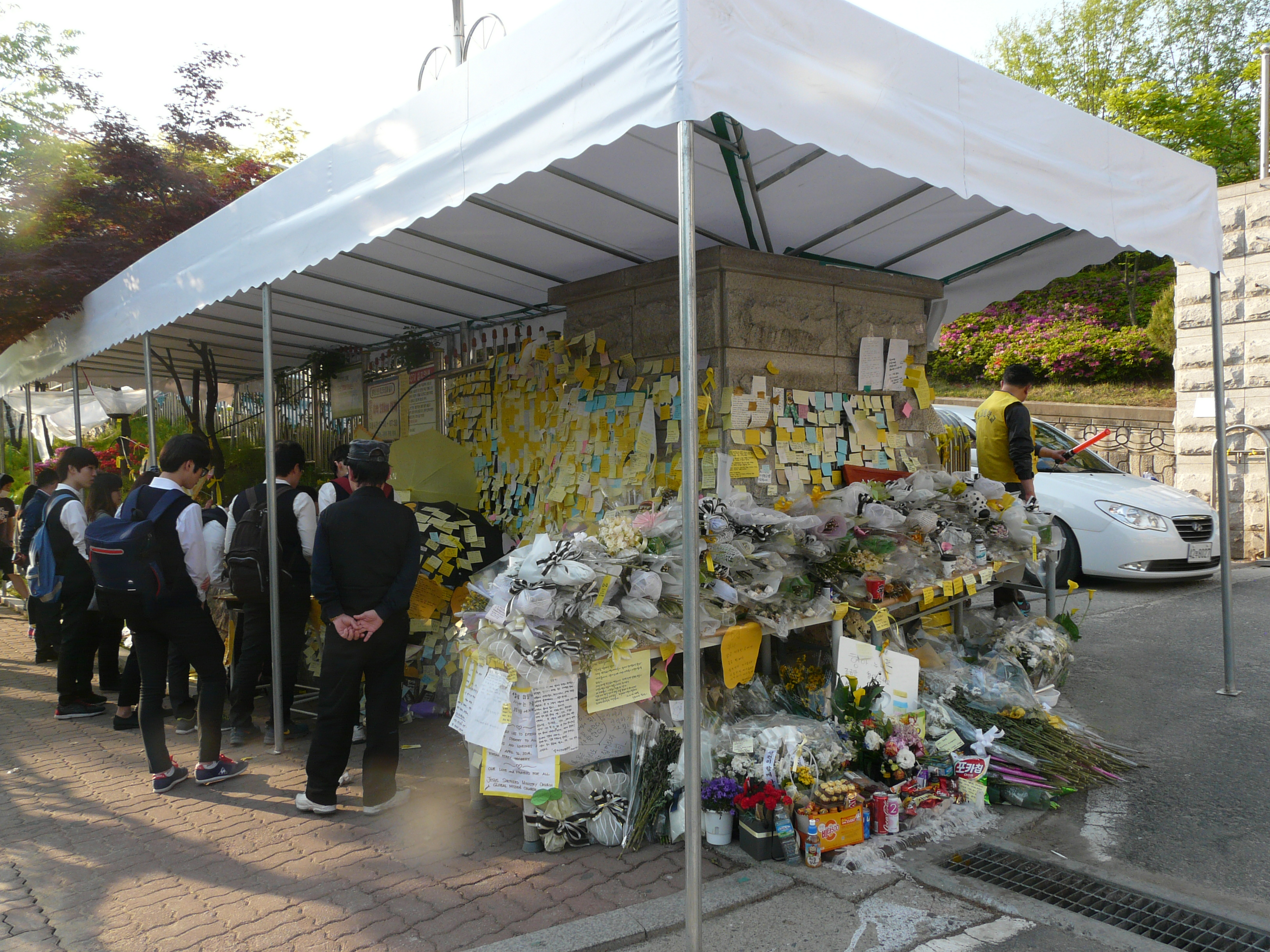
A memorial wall near the Danwon High School, where most of the victims were from

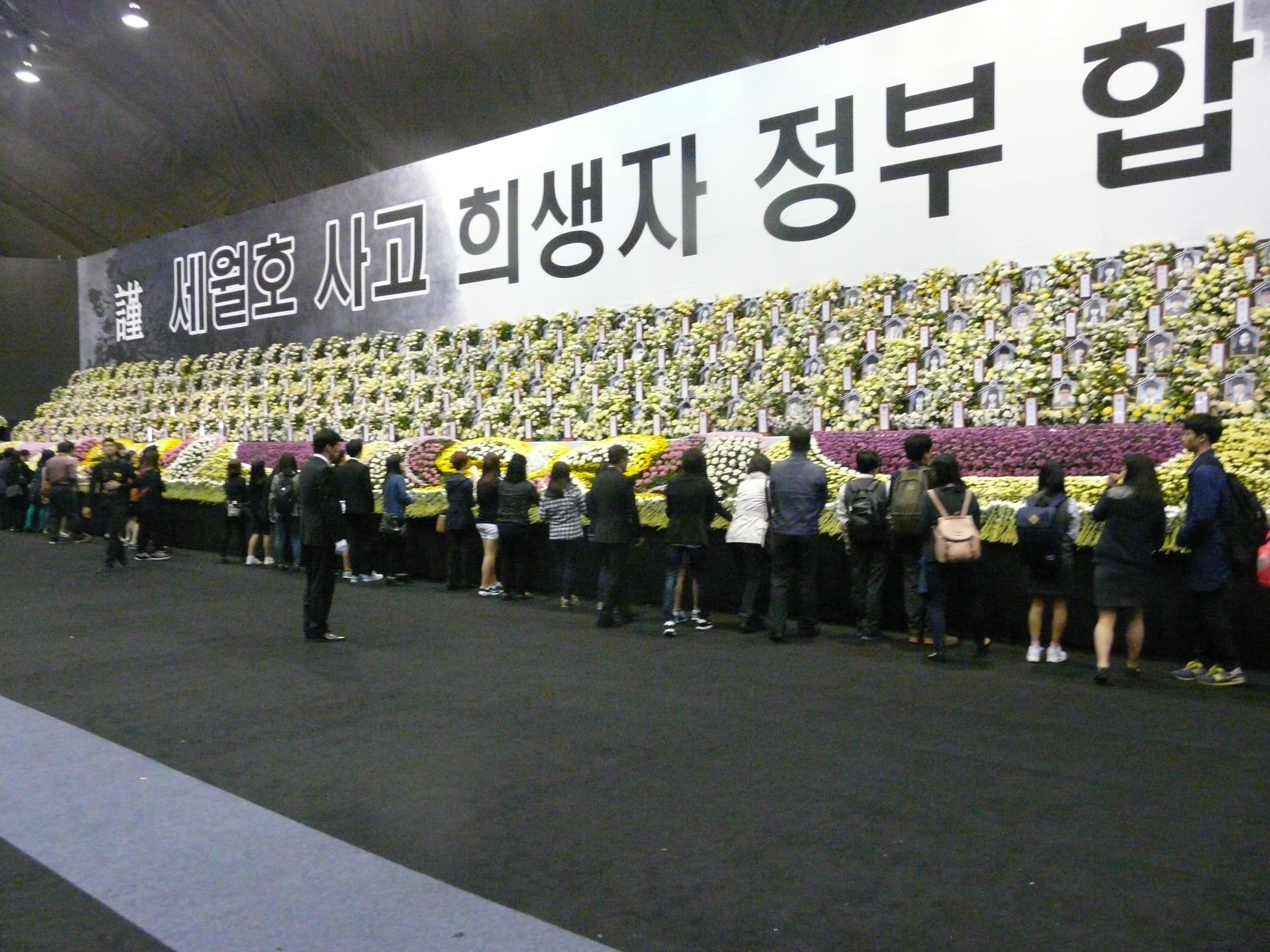
A memorial ceremony in Hwarang Public Garden, a park near the Danwon High School

=== Political ===
In addition to reaction against the actions of Sewol, there has been a much wider political reaction to the disaster. Criticism has ranged from anger at the lax regulatory environment, which contributed to the safety violations that sunk Sewol, to anger about the rescue operations, to anger at President Park, whose approval ratings fell from a high of 71 percent before the disaster to "the 40 percent range" weeks afterwards.

Political reaction to the sinking was intensified by a series of events. A prominent South Korean politician from the ruling Saenuri Party, Chung Mong-joon, was forced to apologize when his son wrote a controversial Facebook post attacking the public for criticizing Park's government over the disaster. Many parents of the victims expressed deep anger at the government, ranging from reportedly berating South Korean Prime Minister Jung Hong-won, to shouting at President Park, to staging protests at the Blue House, partly inflamed by a reported remark by a senior news editor at the government-funded Korean Broadcasting System that the number of dead was "not many, compared with the number of people killed in traffic crashes each year."

US President Barack Obama sent his condolences and assured that the United States would help in the search for survivors, and during a state visit to South Korea presented a magnolia tree from the White House to Danwon High School. Japanese Prime Minister Shinzo Abe offered sympathy to the victims. Vietnamese President Truong Tan Sang, as well as his deputy prime minister and minister of foreign affairs, sent their condolences to Yun Byung-se, South Korea's Minister of Foreign Affairs. Singapore Prime Minister Lee Hsien Loong sent messages of condolences to President Park, as did Chinese President Xi Jinping. On 23 April, the North Korean government sent condolences. On 24 April, Pope Francis expressed his condolences for the loss of so many lives.

On 27 April, Prime Minister Jung Hong-won accepted responsibility for the disaster and announced his resignation. Two days later, President Park indirectly apologized for the government's response to the sinking. On 18 May, the BBC reported that Park Geun-hye announced plans to break up the Korea Coast Guard after it had failed to respond well during the disaster. According to Park, "investigation and information roles will be transferred to the Korean police while the rescue and salvage operation and ocean security roles will be transferred to the Department for National Safety which will be newly established."

=== Civilian ===
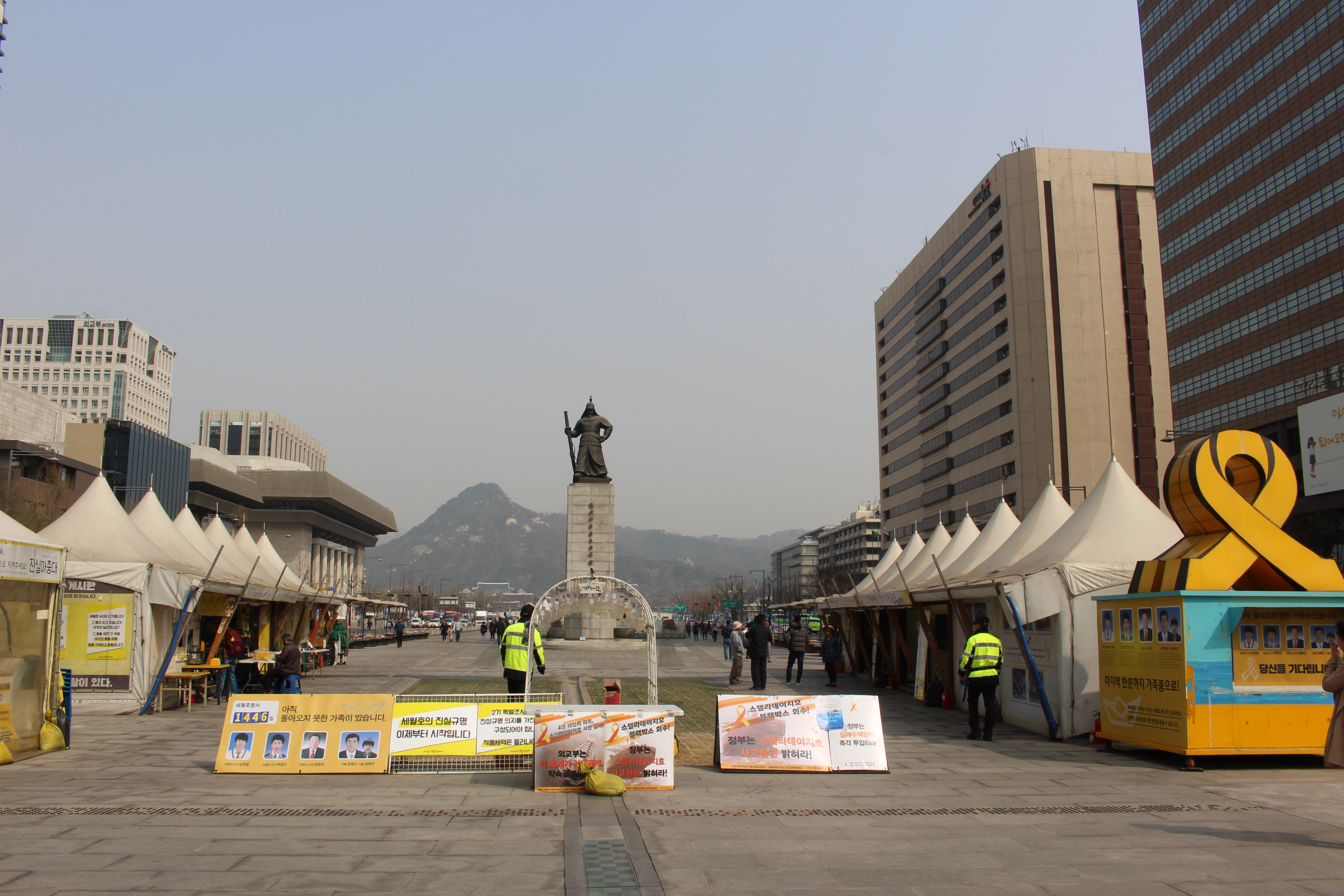
Memorial place on Gwanghwamun Plaza

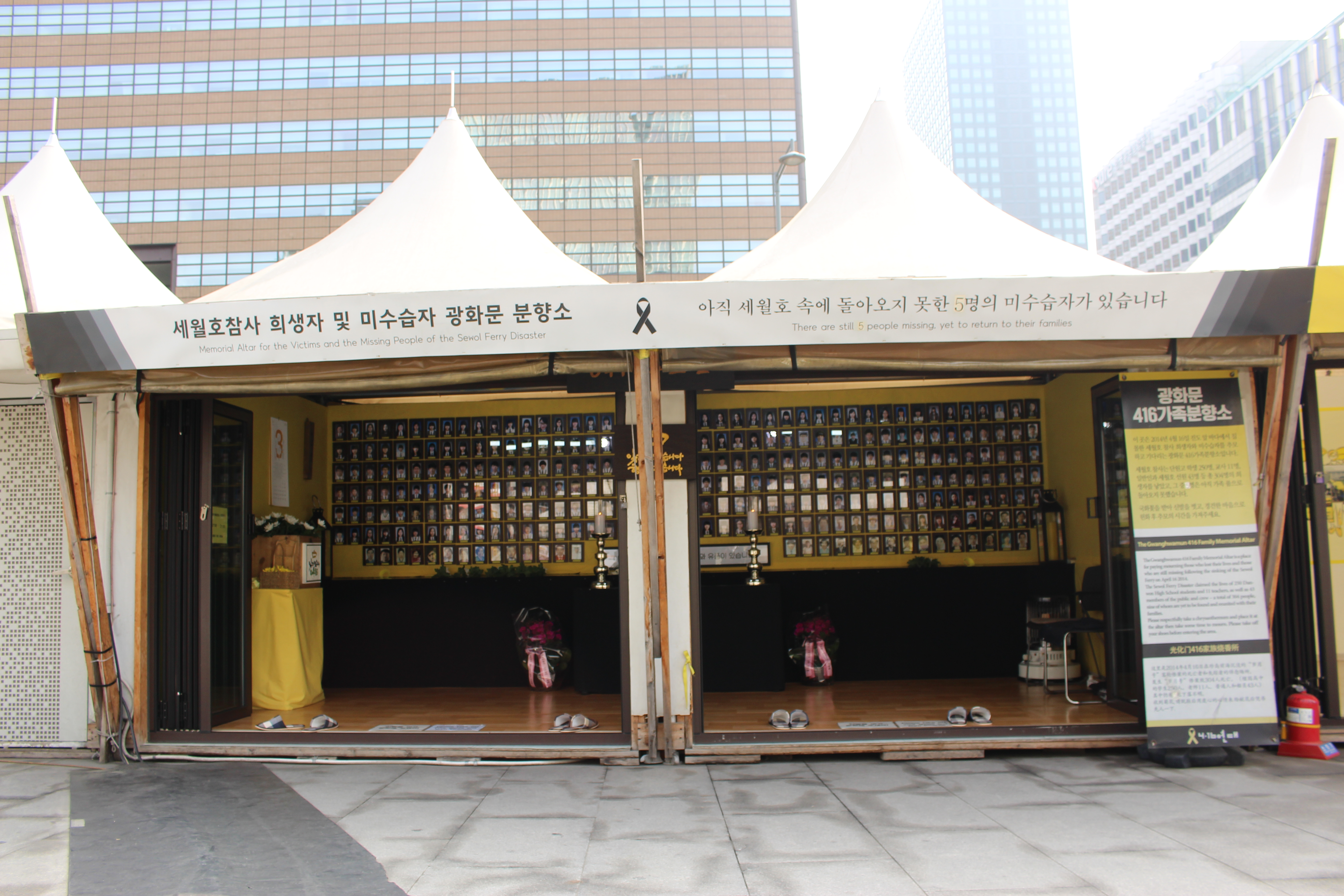
Memorial booth on Gwanghwamun Plaza

On 17 April, a representative of Cheonghaejin Marine apologized for the incident. The chairman and CEO of the KR, Chon Young-Kee, resigned on 28 April, following raids on its offices by South Korean prosecutors.

On 18 April, the rescued vice principal of Danwon High School, Kang Min-kyu, 52, committed suicide by hanging himself. Kang had organized the field trip that had brought the high school party aboard Sewol and had written in his two-page suicide note, which was found in his wallet by police: "Surviving alone is too painful when 200 lives are unaccounted for ... I take full responsibility." The note ended with a request that his body be cremated and the ashes scattered over the site of the accident "that I might be a teacher in heaven to those kids whose bodies have not been found."

On 22 April, an internet user made a post encouraging others to take part in a yellow ribbon campaign on KakaoTalk. The image accompanying the post had a caption stating, "One small movement, big miracle." Since then, the yellow ribbon has been used to symbolize mourning for the sinking victims. The ribbons are prominent in social media, sometimes as profile photos, and were used by celebrities such as Jo Kwon and Hye-rim Park. In 2017, the yellow ribbon campaign received renewed media coverage as various K-pop musicians wrote songs with references to the symbol, wore the ribbon during performances, and posted images of the ribbon on their social media sites to commemorate the third anniversary of the disaster.

On 17 April 2015, a day after the first anniversary of the sinking, 4,475 participants holding electronic candles formed the shape of the Sewol ferry at the commemoration event titled 'The Saddest Challenge in the World' in front of Seoul City Hall. The event continues to be memorialized by Korean students in school ceremonies.

Amid growing public frustration over the government's disorganized and ineffective response to the disaster, numerous civilians mobilized to assist in the rescue and recovery operations, and many rescues were conducted by civilians rather than official state agencies. Civilian divers, in particular, played a significant role, with some demonstrating greater skill and readiness than official rescue personnel. One such figure was Lee Jong-in, head of Alpha Diving Corp., who advocated the use of a "diving bell" to facilitate longer and safer underwater operations. Although the equipment had the potential to improve rescue efficiency, Lee's proposal was repeatedly obstructed by government agencies, which refused to incorporate civilian input into the official efforts. His involvement became a subject of public controversy after mainstream media outlets portrayed him as an opportunist, a narrative later criticized for diverting attention from state failures. Despite this, many viewed the civilian-led operations as more effective and sincere than those of the state. The contrast between grassroots initiative and institutional dysfunction became a focal point of national debate, intensifying demands for transparency, accountability, and systemic reform in South Korea's disaster response infrastructure. The psychological burden on civilian volunteers, including divers who later reported trauma and loss of livelihood, further stressed the human cost of the state's inadequate coordination and support.

Kim Gwan-hong, a Sewol diver, died from apparent suicide in June 2016 after he had suffered injuries during search and rescue operations that prevented him from working again as a diver. During a government hearing in 2015, he had testified that painful memories of handling dead bodies from Sewol had haunted him. Kim expressed disappointment in the government for its negligence towards the volunteers: "Now I urge the government not to seek people's help in any disaster but do it itself."

== Victims' families ==
The 4–16 Coalition (translated name) represents some of the Sewol victims' families, and it has encouraged the investigation of the Sewol ferry accident. The 4–16 Coalition evaluated the results of the investigation of the SDC, pointing out four major issues. First, the investigation of the failed rescue efforts on the day of the disaster was not conducted properly. Second, there were questionable acts committed by the Park administration during the investigation that were widely publicized, such as concealing information, interfering with the investigation of the sinking and rescue, violations of the rights of the victims' families, and illegal interrogations. Representatives from the group noted it was impossible to obtain data from Korea's intelligence agencies (the acting prime minister after Park was removed from office designated Park's activities on the day of the disaster as a matter of "presidential record", making the files unable to be accessed for up to 30 years). Third, the cause of the sinking could not be determined. Fourth, various limitations and problems, including confusion due to lack of communication, were revealed in the investigation process.

== Salvage ==
On 22 March 2017, the salvage operation began to raise the wreck of Sewol. A Chinese consortium, Shanghai Salvage Company, was contracted by the government to carry out the operation. The ship was lying on its port side, nearly forty metres below the surface. Diesel and oil were drained from the ship. All the cabins were sealed and a huge fence was erected on the seabed to prevent any wreckage from drifting away. A crane lifted the bow of the ship five degrees so that thirty-three lifting beams could be placed underneath. The salvage crew pumped water out of the ship's ballast tanks and attached air bags to increase the ship's buoyancy. Cables were attached to the lifting beams and strand jacks gradually lifted the ship to thirteen metres below the surface, where she was then attached to a barge. Sewol was then towed and loaded onto a semi-submersible vessel, Dockwise White Marlin. She was loaded onto self-propelled modular transporters (SPMTs) while on the vessel, which then transported her to shore. The vessel docked at Mokpo, where ALE were contracted to unload the ship using the SPMTs. The wreck is located on Mokpo dock at 34°45′31″N 126°21′03″E.

At the time of the ship's raising, nine passengers were still unaccounted for. In order of retrieval, the remains of teacher Go Chang-Seok were found at the sinking site after the ship's removal, followed by the remains of Danwon High School students Heo Da-Yun and Cho Eun-Hwa and passenger Lee Young-Sook inside the ship. For most victims at this point, only partial remains were retrieved and DNA testing was used to identify them.

By the end of the search operations on 19 October 2018, five victims remained missing: Danwon High School students Nam Hyeon-Cheol (16) and Park Yeong-In (16); teacher Yang Seung-Jin (57); and father and son passengers Kwon Jae-Geun (48) and Kwon Hyeok-Gyu (6).

== See also ==
- List of maritime disasters in the 21st century
- Sinking of Oryong 501
- Sinking of the MV Seohae
- System accident
