= Maenggolgundo =

Archipelago with six islands in South Korea

- Interactive map of Maenggolgundo

Geography
- Location: Maenggoldo-ri, Jodo-myeon, Jindo County, South Jeolla Province, South Korea
- Coordinates: 34°13′N 125°51′E
- Total islands: 6
- Major islands: Jukdo, Maenggoldo, Gwakdo

Korean name
- Hangul: 맹골군도
- Hanja: 孟骨群島
- RR: Maenggol gundo
- MR: Maenggol kundo

Maenggolgundo (Korean: 맹골군도), also Maenggol Kundo, is an archipelago in Maenggoldo-ri, Jodo-myeon, Jindo County, South Jeolla Province, South Korea. It consists of six islands. Three of the islands are inhabited: (from north to south) Jukdo (죽도), Maenggoldo (맹골도), and Gwakdo (곽도). Three are uninhabited islets: Myeongdo (명도), Mongdeokdo (몽덕도), and Sojukdo (소죽도).

The archipelago receives its name from the largest of its islands, Maenggoldo.

The archipelago formed when a mountain range was submerged by rising sea levels over time. Most of the islands' cliffs are rocky and steep. There is little land suitable for agriculture, so most of its inhabitants are involved in fishing. The fishing grounds are considered rich, with tourists visiting to fish as well. Many boats stop by the islands while fishing in the area.
