= Sinking of Oryong 501 =

2014 shipwreck of a Korean trawler

The Sinking of Oryong No 501 (Korean: 501 오룡호 침몰 사고) occurred on December 1, 2014, in the Bering Sea. The fishing trawler sank with an official crew of 60, including 35 Indonesians, 13 Filipinos, 11 South Koreans, and a Russian inspector. However Russian sources state that there were 62 aboard.

The 83-metre long Oryong No 501 (Korean: 제501 오룡) is a forty-year-old vessel operated by Sajo Industries, initial reports suggested that the ship became swamped by waves whilst the crew were hauling in their catch. On December 1, 2014, the international rescue operation, hampered by inclement weather, managed to recover three Filipinos, three Indonesians and the Russian inspector.

== See also ==
- Sinking of MV Sewol
