= Sinking of Namyoung-Ho =

Sinking of a South Korean ferry in 1970

- Sinking of Namyoung-Ho (South Korea)
- Date: December 15, 1970
- Time: around 1 AM
- Location: 34°5′N 128°5′E
- Deaths: between 323 and 326

The sinking of Namyoung-Ho (Korean: 남영호 침몰 사고) was a marine accident that occurred in the sea near South Korea on December 15, 1970.

== Overview ==
On December 15, 1970, the South Korean ferryboat Namyoung sank in the Korea Strait. The vessel was heading from Seogwipo-si to Seongsanpo Port near Busan, before it sank about 28 miles (45 km) away from Yeosu and Jeollanam.

== Boat ==
The ferry was a 362-ton vessel, with a reported capacity of 302 persons and 150 tons of cargo.

== Incident ==
On December 12, 1970, the ferry departed with 338 passengers on board en route to Jeju island from Busan. The sinking on December 14 was blamed on overloading of the vessel, with initial reports stating that the ferry tilted to one side after 150 crates of tangerines had been placed on one side of the ship. Investigations revealed that the Namyoung had a capacity of 150 tons of cargo but was carrying 500 tons of cargo. Additionally, rescue was delayed as the original SOS from the ferry was either not received or ignored by the Coast Guard, which contributed to the high casualty rate. There were a reported 326 deaths or missing persons.

== See also ==
- List of South Korean ferry disasters
- Sinking of MV Sewol
