= Byeongpungdo =

Island in Jindo County, South Korea

Coordinates: 34.148871°N 125.9435084°E

- Hangul: 병풍도
- Hanja: 屛風島
- RR: Byeongpungdo
- MR: Pyŏngp'ungdo

Byeongpungdo

Byeongpungdo, or Byeongpung Island, or Pyeongpung is an uninhabited island in South Korea's Dadohaehaesang National Park, with an area of 0.56 square kilometers. It is located at the southern extremity of Jindo County, South Jeolla Province, in the administrative division of Donggeochado-ri, Jodo-myeon.

The island is formed from Cretaceous-era volcanic rock of the Yucheon Group, part of the Gyeongsang System which underlies much of South Korea. Although there is some vegetation, including thick groves of bay trees, the central part of the island consists solely of bare rock, rising sharply to a height of 129.4 meters above the water.

Byeongpungdo is home to ten species of rare birds, including the nationally endangered streaked shearwater and peregrine falcon. In 2000 it was designated a specified island under the Special Act on the Preservation of Ecosystem in Island Areas Including Dokdo Island.

On April 26, 2011, due to ongoing natural areas restoration and monitoring, the Korea National Park Service declared Byeongpungdo and four other islands off limits. They will be open for public and tourist access on April 30, 2016.

In April 2014, the MV Sewol ferry capsized north of Byeongpungdo. The island's distinctive crags featured in the background of many press photos of the disaster.

== See also ==
- Desert island
- List of islands
