= Danwon High School =

High school in Danwon District, Ansan, South Korea

Coordinates: 37°19′39″N 126°49′27″E

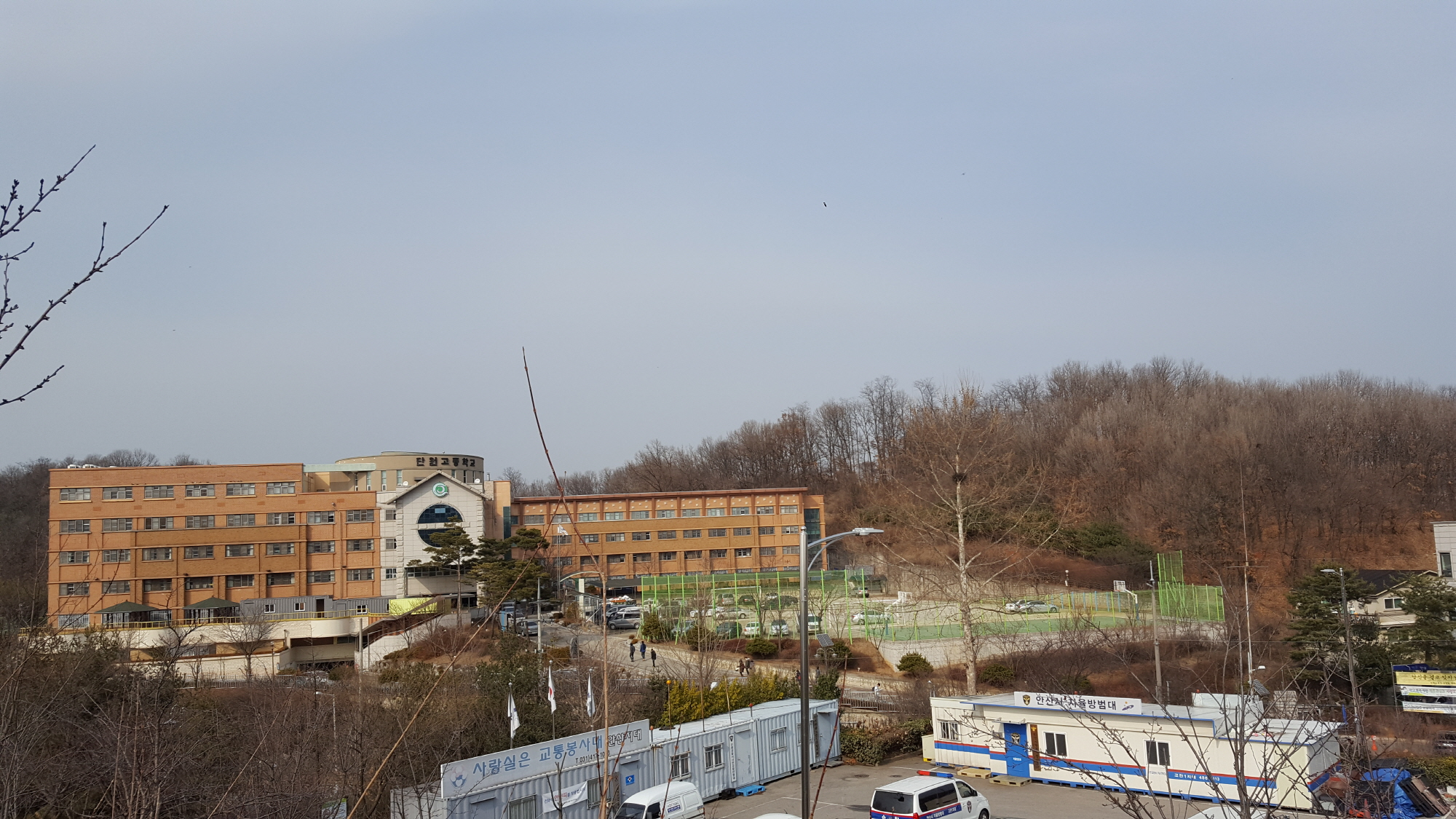
Danwon High School in February 2016

Danwon High School (Korean: 단원고등학교; Hanja: 檀園高等學校) is a coeducational high school located in Danwon District, Ansan, South Korea. It is a state school, being under the authority of Gyeonggi Province's Office of Education.

The school was founded in 2005. In cooperation with The Borderless Village, a non-governmental organization, it established a multiculturalism program in 2006 and 2007. Its motto is "self-realization." As of May 2013, there were 1542 pupils at the school.

== MV Sewol tragedy ==
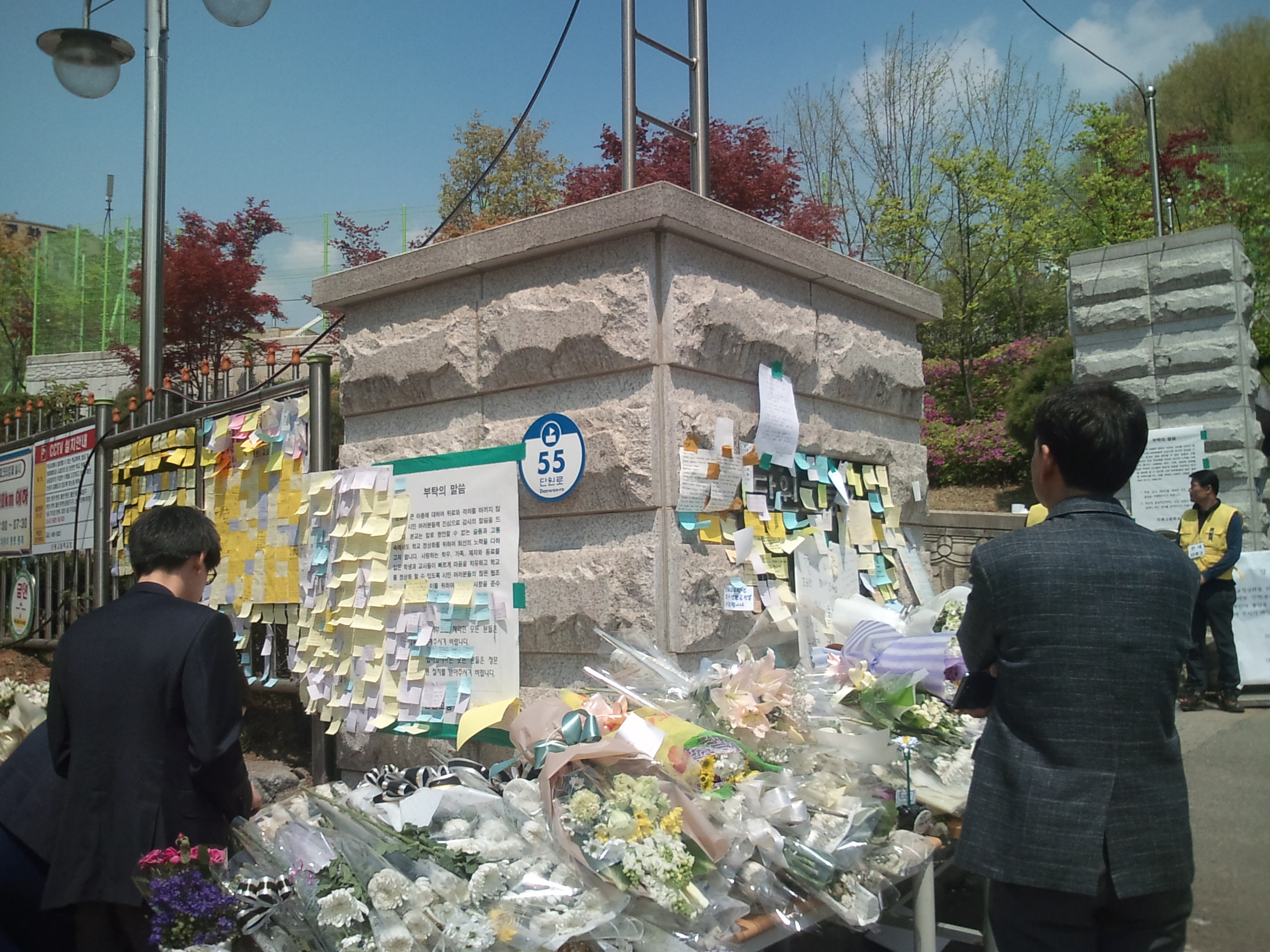
Memorials for the victims of the sinking of the MV Sewol in Danwon High School

On 16 April 2014, a ferry carrying 325 of the school's second-year class and a dozen of its teachers capsized en route from Incheon towards Jeju Island resulting in many fatalities and injuries.

The school was closed until 24 April when it opened only for the 75 surviving juniors; yellow ribbons were tied to the school's gate, and a shrine of flowers and hundreds of notes to the dead adorned the school's entrance. A makeshift memorial was established in a nearby basketball gymnasium, with a wall of flowers and dozens of photos of the dead and missing.

The school's vice principal, Kang Min-kyu, who had been rescued from the ferry, died by suicide a few days after the disaster.

The classrooms used by the second-year students at the time of the disaster had been preserved as a "Memorial Classrooms," but when new students were assigned to the school in 2016, there was a shortage of classrooms. It was argued that the “Memorial Classroom” should be returned to the current students to resolve the shortage and alleviate the psychological burden on them. The Gyeonggi Provincial Office of Education proposed to the bereaved families that it would relocate the 10 Memory Classrooms to a site in front of the school to create a facility tentatively named the "April 16 Democratic Citizenship Education Center", but the plan was scrapped due to opposition from relevant groups, prompting some parents to disrupt new student orientations and declare that they would block all school events and access to the school until the Memory Classrooms were returned.

== Sister schools ==
- Hanseo University
- Chungwoon University
- Soonchunhyang University
