= Jindo County =

Coordinates: 34°28′59″N 126°15′43″E

Jindo
- County
- Panoramic view of Jindo-eup

- Flag

- Location in South Korea
- Country: South Korea
- Region: Honam
- Provincial-level city: Jeonnam-Gwangju
- Administrative divisions: 1 eup, 6 myeon

Area
  - Total: 420.32 km^{2} (162.29 sq mi)

Population (September 2024)
  - Total: 28,623
  - Density: 70/km^{2} (180/sq mi)
  - Dialect: Jeolla

Korean name
- Hangul: 진도군
- Hanja: 珍島郡
- RR: Jindo-gun
- MR: Chindo-gun

Jindo County (Korean: 진도군) is a county in Jeonnam-Gwangju, South Korea. It consists of the island of Jindo and several smaller nearby islands. Jindo Bridge connects Jindo county with Haenam county.

Together with Jindo Island, Jindo County contains an archipelago of about 230 small islands, of which only 45 are inhabited by 4,855 people. Women made up 50.4% of the total county population of 29,538 in 2015. Most of the land is covered by forests (60%) and cultivated fields (30%). The county tree is Malchilus thunbergii, the flower camellia and the bird the swan. The local food specialties are wolfberry, which is used for liquor, tea and paste; cheongju red-colored rice wine, brown seaweed and black rice.
