= Fred Hirsch =

Fred Hirsch may refer to:

- Fred Hirsch (economist) (1931–1978), professor of international studies at the University of Warwick
- Fred Hirsch (entrepreneur) (1888–1979), American naturopath, entrepreneur, salesman, and author
