= Yoo Byung-eun =

South Korean clergyman and businessman (1941–2014)

- Born: February 11, 1941; Kyoto, Empire of Japan
- Died: June 12, 2014 (aged 73); Suncheon, South Korea
- Other name: "The Millionaire with no Face"
- Education: Seonggwang High School
- Occupations: Clergy; businessman; photographer
- Years active: 1961–2014
- Known for: Sinking of MV Sewol
- Spouse: Kwon Yun-ja (m. 1966)
- Children: 4

Korean name
- Hangul: 유병언
- Hanja: 兪炳彥
- RR: Yu Byeongeon
- MR: Yu Pyŏngŏn
- Website: ahae.com

Yoo Byung-eun (Korean: 유병언; 11 February 1941 – 12 June 2014), also known by the art name Ahae, was a South Korean clergyman, businessman and photographer.

Yoo became the focus of Park Geun-hye's administration shortly after the sinking of MV Sewol in April 2014. Yoo and other Korean nationals were used as scapegoats in a nation-wide propaganda campaign designed to manage public opinion after the disaster. In official documents from the Blue House, the Defense Security Command (DSC) identified Yoo as a target to distract the public from its dissent over the Korean Coast Guard's failure to rescue passengers from the ferry. Yoo, who retired from his board position at Chonghaejin in 1997, was targeted in official communications prior to the conclusion of any investigation to manage public outrage and maintain government stability. During the campaign to find and discredit Yoo, the government purposely fed several large media companies information designed to focus public interest onto the manhunt for Yoo instead of the cause of the ferry sinking. In addition, the DSC performed illegal wiretaps, which has drawn comparisons to the 2002 National Intelligence Service illegal wiretapping scandal. After a nationwide manhunt that was broadly reported on, Yoo's body was found in an orchard. The cause of death is not known.

== Early life and education ==
Yoo was born in Kyoto, Japan to Korean parents on 11 February 1941. Yoo's family returned to Korea following the liberation from Japanese colonial rule in 1945 and settled in Daegu, where Yoo graduated from Seonggwang High School.

== Career ==
=== Religious call ===
According to the U.S.-based non-profit organization Evangelical Media Group created by Yoo in 2001, "he first began to live for the sake of the gospel in 1961," and he "worked as an inventor and businessman to support the spreading of the gospel all over the world". Yoo was one of 11 students admitted to the Good News Mission Bible school established in Korea by American and English missionaries, but he was expelled. He founded what later became the Evangelical Baptist Church of Korea, also known as the Salvation Sect, in 1962 with his father-in-law, Pastor Kwon Shin-chan (권신찬; 1923–96). The church was held to be a cult by a conservative Christian denomination, the General Assembly of Presbyterian Churches, in 1992.

=== Acquisition of Samwoo Trading and founding of Semo Corp. ===
Yoo, while still serving as a pastor, got his start in business when acquiring the bankrupt textile company Samwoo Trading Co. (삼우무역) in 1976. He took over as CEO in 1978, and turned it into a toy manufacturing and export company. Yoo went into shipping when he founded Semo Corp. (주식회사 세모) in 1979, a holding company that came to span shipping, shipbuilding, domestic ferry businesses, electronics, real estate, cosmetics, paint, stuffed toys, pewter, and various other ventures. Semo started operating ferries on Seoul's Han River in 1986, two years before the city held the Summer Olympics.

=== Odaeyang mass suicide ===
Yoo came to public attention in connection with the Odaeyang mass suicide in 1987. Police were investigating accusations against a 48-year-old woman, Park Soon-ja, saying that she had swindled ₩8.9 billion (~US$8.7 million) from about 220 people. Odeyang Trading Co. was a firm established by Park who used to attend Evangelical Baptist Church of Korea and Jehovah's Witnesses in the past. Yoo has denied any link to the group. On 29 August 1987, thirty-two members of the sect who believed in doomsday, including Park Soon-ja and her three children, were found dead, bound and gagged. Police assumed the event was a murder–suicide pact, and the prosecution initially suspected that Yoo was linked to the case; but he was never charged, and the police closed the case as a mass suicide. After six people, including a former follower of Park named Kim Do-hyun, surrendered to authorities on 10 July 1991, the case was reopened and found money transactions between Odaeyang Trading Co. and a member of Evangelical Baptist Church. However, the money transactions revealed that they had nothing to do with Odaeyang Trading Co. case, and private loan of Odaeyang Trading Co. Those were normal payment remittances of goods between Park and the member of Evangelical Baptist Church before establishment of Odaeyang Trading Co. Yoo was arrested and, in 1992, convicted of "habitual fraud under the mask of religion" for his role in colluding with one of his employees to collect donations from church members in the amount of ₩1.2 billion (~US$1.15 million) and invest them in his businesses. He served a 4-year prison term. In November 2014, report says Incheon District Prosecutor's Office confirm in May there was no connection between Yoo and Odaeyang incident.

=== Semo Corp. bankruptcy ===
By 1990, Semo Corp. had 1,800 employees, but the ferry businesses suffered maritime accidents. In 1990, 14 Semo workers were killed when their cruise ship on the Han River was hit by another ship. The company was cleared of any liability for the incident. Semo grew into the biggest ferry operator by 1994, operating 30 ships, and once had nearly 3,000 employees.

Semo Group filed for bankruptcy with more than ₩300 billion (~US$294 million) in debts amidst the 1997 Asian financial crisis, in the wake of a series of highly publicized scandals, citing business diversification as the cause of a cash shortage that had fuelled a rise in debts in its bankruptcy protection petition, and was liquidated.

After Semo's bankruptcy, Yoo's family continued to operate ferry businesses under the names of other companies, including one that eventually became Chonghaejin Marine, and grew to become the monopolistic operator of ferries linking Incheon and Jeju.

Chonghaejin Marine Company Ltd. was set up two years later on 24 February 1999, a day before a court approved the restructuring of the bankrupt Semo, and became a key entity to consolidate Semo's shipping business, taking over ships and assets held by Semo Marine, and had its debts written off.

=== Other ventures ===
In France in 2012, Yoo made headlines prior to his photo exhibition in the Tuileries Garden at The Louvre when he through his public relations company, Ahae Press, bought the abandoned village of Courbefy for €520,000 (US$663,000, ₩767.5 million). Yoo had seen it on CNN, and wanted to set up an "environmental, artistic and cultural" project in the village. Yoo has a wide range of other business interests according to official documents and information on company websites. He owns a plantation in the United States called 123Farm, one of the largest organic lavender farms in California started in 2001 at the site of the Highland Springs Resort, a 2,400 acres (970 ha; 3.8 sq mi) property consisting of a 56-room hotel, conference center, and restaurants. Yoo was chairman of the board of the company that bought the resort in May 1990 for US$6.75 million. I-One-I Holdings subsidiary Dapanda owns 9.9 percent of the Highland Springs Conference and Training Centre at the resort, according to regulatory filings.

=== Inventions ===
As an inventor, Yoo holds multiple patents, one being for a colonic irrigation system, for which he received an International Federation of Inventors' Associations' prize at the 2006 Seoul International Invention Fair. The invention is marketed in the United States, Canada, Mexico, Germany, South Korea, Philippines, and Malaysia by NaeClear, and is sold in South Korea by the company Dapanda. It "arose from the concept of Hemato-Centric Health, which revolves around the blood as being the center of life." supposedly a concept created by Yoo and his non-profit research organization Hemato-Centric Life Institute (New York) chaired by his younger son Keith H. Yoo (Yoo Hyuk-kee, 유혁기; born 1972); sponsored by NaeClear Co., Ltd. and daughter Yoo Som-na's company Moreal Design Inc., Yoo delivered keynote speeches at the 2010–13 Hemato-Centric Life Forum meetings in Seoul organized by Hemato-Centric Life Foundation.

=== Ahae ===
Ahae (아해), which means "child" in old Korean language, was a nickname used in reference to Yoo in correspondence on an Evangelical Baptist Church website EBC World. Through his PR companies Ahae Press, Inc. in New York, Ahae Press France in Paris, and Ahae Press Ltd. UK in London, Yoo has exhibited and marketed himself as the photographer who goes by the name Ahae. Yoo was unknown as a photographer before 2011.

The project titled Through My Window began in early spring 2009 and continued for 4 years, during which time Yoo allegedly took about 2.7 million photographs, all through one window, which equates to a rate of roughly one photo every 60 seconds. The collection mainly consists of natural scenes shot through the window of Yoo's own studio. The location is the rural commune belonging to the Evangelical Baptist Church called "Geumsuwon" (금수원) east of Anseong south of Seoul, where Yoo lived.

Yoo first exhibited Through My Window in the Vanderbilt Hall of Grand Central Terminal, New York City, in April 2011; co-produced by daughter Yoo Som-na's company Moreal Design, it was organized by Hemato-Centric Life Institute, and sponsored by Highland Springs Resort and Bear Family Green Club. His exhibition Through My Window: Vibrancy and Serenity was on display on the same location in October 2011. Yoo did not attend the exhibition that was unveiled by his second son, Yoo Hyuk-kee, known outside South Korea as Keith H. Yoo. Keith, as CEO of Ahae Press, curated his father's exhibitions.

As a travelling exhibition, Through My Window was then on display in Europe at the National Gallery in Prague, Clarence House Gardens, Lancaster House, and Royal Botanic Gardens at Kew in London, Vremena Goda Galleries in Moscow, Museo Nazionale Alinari della Fotografia in Florence, and in Magazzini del Sale, Venice.

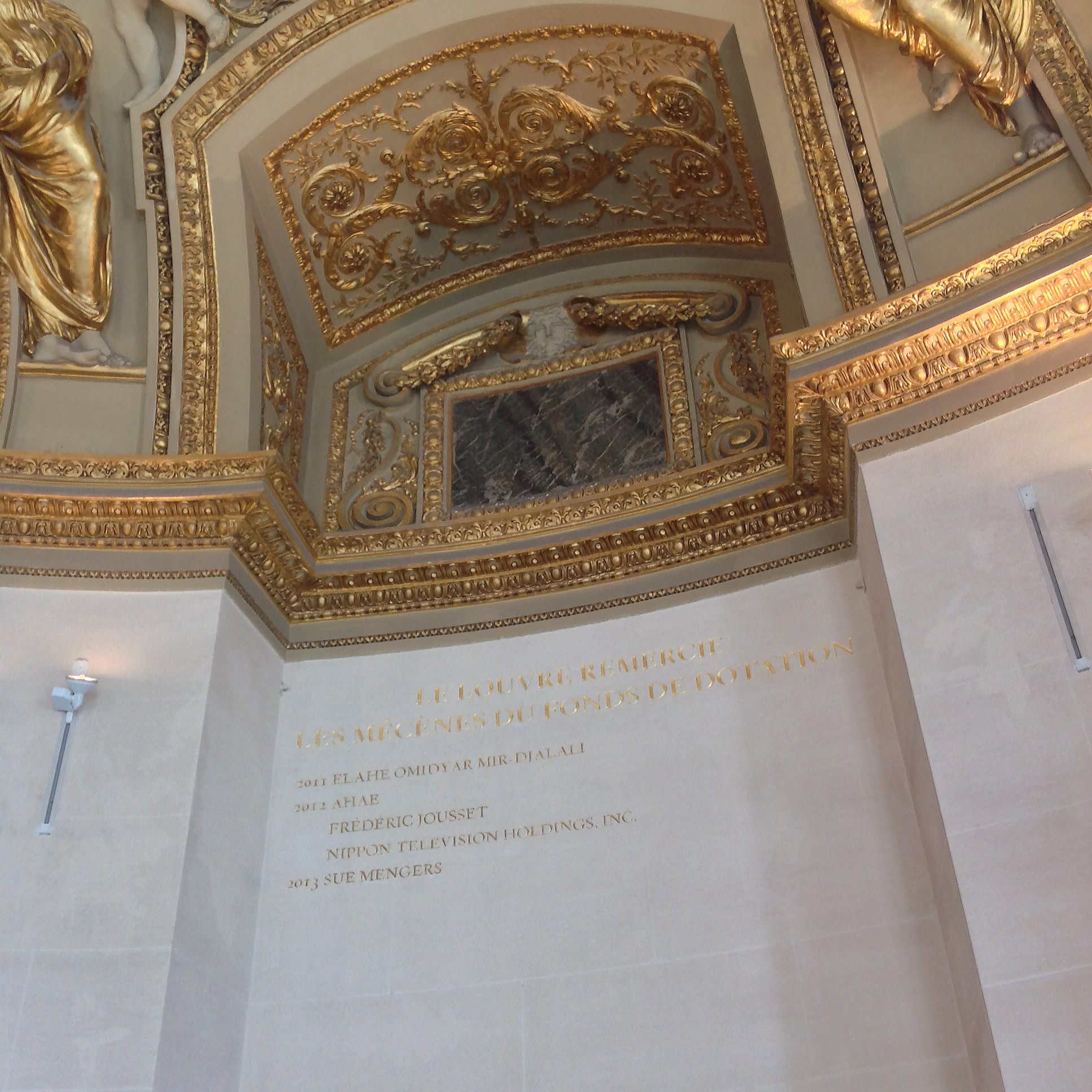
"Ahae" etched in stone at the Louvre in Paris, as one of its patrons.

From June to August 2012, Through My Window (De ma fenêtre) was displayed in a 12,000 square feet (1,100 m^{2}), four-story bespoke exhibition pavilion erected in the Tuileries Garden, that is administratively attached to The Louvre, in Paris. English film composer Ilan Eshkeri was commissioned to write a twelve-part tone poem. Pre-recorded in Abbey Road Studios by the London Metropolitan Orchestra the 46 minutes composition played alongside the exhibition, and was later released on Blu-ray Disc. For the gala dinner in the exhibition pavilion on 25 June 2012 Keith H. Yoo had commissioned British composer Michael Nyman to write a 26 minutes long piano quintet in four movements titled Through the Only Window. The work was subsequently recorded by Nyman Quintet in the Abbey Road Studios, and released on Nyman's record label. Hervé Barbaret, deputy to former director of The Louvre Henri Loyrette, disclosed to L'Express in 2014 that "The Louvre did not pay a penny to organize this event. The artist paid the production entirely and paid a little more than €500,000 (~US$700.000, ~₩700 million) to exhibit himself in the Tuileries". Ahae further donated €1.1 million (~US$1.5 million, ~₩1.5 billion) to the Louvre.

French magazine A nous Paris in its 25 June 2012 edition asked Keith H. Yoo the question: "The exhibition is a significant cost. Do you have any sponsors?" To which Keith answered: "No. We are funding everything with the money from our different companies. We are not interested in outside pressure and want to enjoy total freedom."

For his second solo exhibition in France, Fenêtre sur l'extraordinaire (Window on the Extraordinary), Ahae rented the Orangerie Hall of the Palace of Versailles from 25 June to 9 September 2013. To mark the end of the exhibition, Michael Nyman was again commissioned, and wrote a 32-minute symphony in four movements for the occasion, Symphony No. 6 "AHAE", representing the four seasons in nature as depicted by Ahae. French composer Nicolas Bacri was commissioned to write a 29-minute symphonic piece, his opus 130, titled "Ahae's Day (Four Images for Orchestra)". The London Symphony Orchestra was hired to premiere both pieces at L'Opéra of the Palace of Versailles in Paris on 8 September 2013. Both pieces were recorded for a planned future release. Ahae was the sole patron of the Bosquet du Théâtre d'Eau (Water Theatre Grove) (fr) currently being recreated with sculptures by Jean-Michel Othoniel in the area of the Gardens of Versailles, donating €1.4 million (~US$1.9 million, ~₩1.9 billion). Catherine Pégard, head of the Public Establishment of the Palace, Museum and National Estate of Versailles who administer the Palace of Versailles, disclosed that the exhibition was on a sponsorship basis, saying "The artist himself wanted to rent the Orangerie. But we never communicate the numbers." Spurred by investigative reporting initially published by Bernard Hasquenoph, French Le Monde and British The Times wrote that Ahae gave €5 million (~US$6.8 million, ~₩6.9 billion) to Versailles.

Financial Times in its review of the Versailles exhibition wrote:

The scene that is the subject of Ahae's images looks, on the face of it, pretty unremarkable. A couple of murky ponds sit in a field which backs on to a fairly uninteresting looking wood. But such is the focus of Ahae's gaze that the viewer comes to know the fauna on the patch – from the fierce great tits who stare defiantly into the camera to the thuggish magpies and the beleaguered egrets and herons who bow to assaults by their neighbours like ageing professors hounded by skinheads.

— Catherine Milner, The Extraordinary within the Ordinary, Versailles – review, Financial Times

The Economist wrote:

At first glance, the view from Ahae's window appears unimpressive. Yet these images reward patience. Ahae's forensic attention to detail reveals the stoicism, dignity and minor dramas of the animals going about their daily business, and raises these pictures to the realm of poetry.

— C.M., Nature photography in Versailles: Seoulful visions, The Economist

Parisian newspapers Le Monde and Libération, several French art magazines, as well as Korean expatriates in France in an open letter on 12 June to French Minister of Culture, Aurélie Filippetti, Catherine Pégard, president of the Château de Versailles, Henri Loyrette, ex-president of the Louvre and co-president of the French-Korean Year, and Bruno Ory-Lavollé, director of the Forest Festival in Compiègne, have raised their concerns over French cultural institutions accepting self-financed exhibitions in return for donations. La Croix on 3 July wrote that French Foreign Minister Laurent Fabius would write to Versailles to demand the termination of the Ahae sponsorship there.

Ahae, through his company Ahae Press, was a patron of the Forest Festival, a classical music festival in the forests of Compiègne, northern France. His photographs were to be projected during a gala concert at Théâtre Impérial de Compiègne on 4 July 2014. The sponsorship commitment was €10,000 (~US$13,640, ~₩13.9 million). Following the open letter on 12 June from Korean expatriates in France to, among others, Minister of Culture Aurélie Filippetti and the director of the Forest Festival, and subsequent talks between the festival and the Ministry of Culture, Foreign Minister Laurent Fabius on 30 June gave written notice to the festival suggesting the projection should be renounced "out of sensitivity and respect for the Korean people mourning [following the sinking of Sewol], in particular the families of the young victims, and in the interest of the Festival and of France"; the projection and the sponsorship was cancelled on 2 July.

An Ahae exhibition produced by Ahae Press titled Les échos du temps de près et de loin (Echos of Time: Far and Near) for the opening season of the new Philharmonie de Paris was scheduled for 5 May to 28 September 2015, and a concert sponsored by Ahae Press on 15 June 2015 in Philharmonie de Paris featuring Nyman's Symphony No. 6 "Ahae" and Beethoven's Symphony No. 6 "Pastorale" was announced; both have been cancelled.

French newspaper La Croix in a comment to the sinking of the MV Sewol wrote:

This businessman with a murky past had used his fortune to exhibit at The Louvre. ... The crew [of the Sewol] was mainly made up of followers of the church of Yoo; temporary, often renewed and who were unfamiliar with their ship. The investigation also revealed that the owner had only spent 541,000 won ($521; €400) on crew training, including evacuation drills for its employees in 2013. Its wealthy owner had other priorities ... he used his fortune to organize worldwide exhibitions of his landscape photographs.

— Frédéric Ojardias, Corée, le scandaleux propriétaire du ferry naufragé, La Croix

France Info commented:

In the Tuileries as at Versailles Ahae himself had financed his own exhibitions. ... In 2013, the company spent $500 in costs for training their crews, an amount that pales in comparison to the wealth of the owner of the shipping company. However, one of the main causes of the tragedy was precisely the total lack of preparation of the crew in case of disaster.

— Pierrick de Morel, Corée du Sud: qui est Yoo Byung-Eun, propriétaire du ferry naufragé?, France Info

Gallery
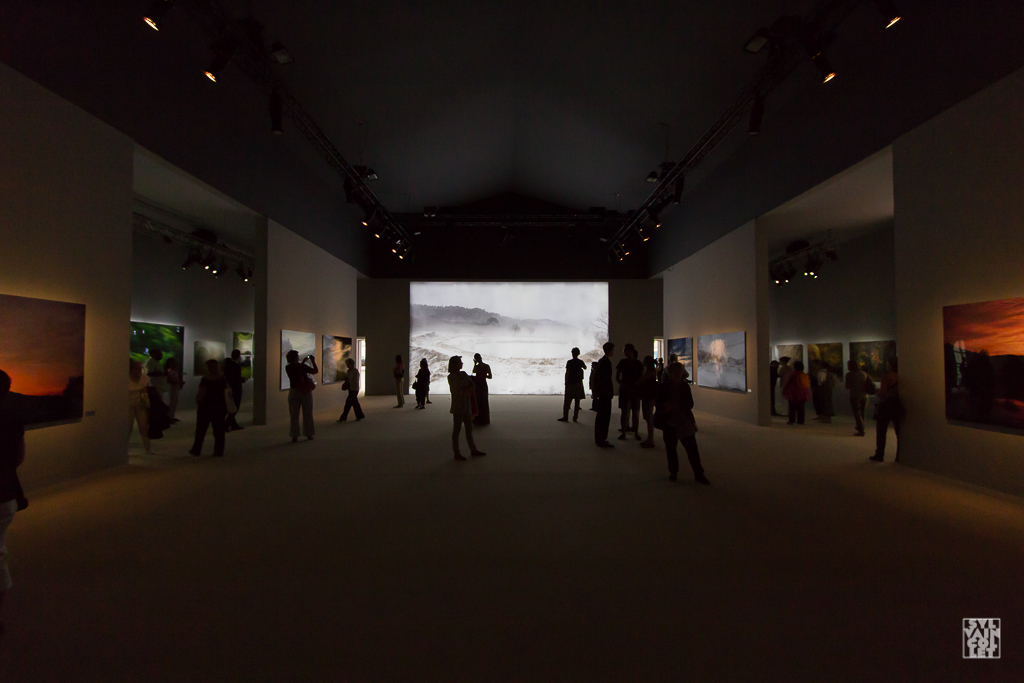
Tuileries Garden 2012

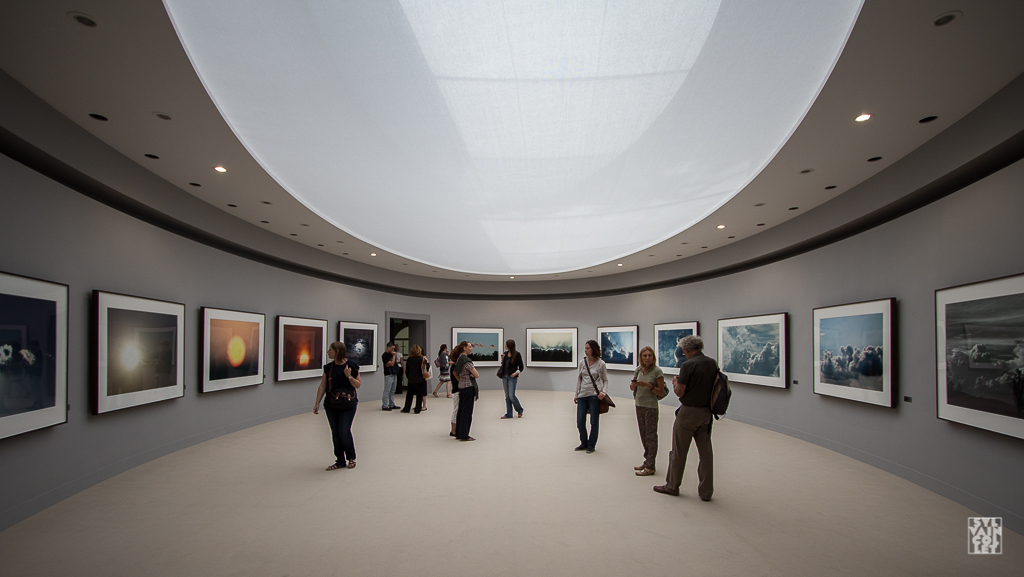
Tuileries Garden 2012

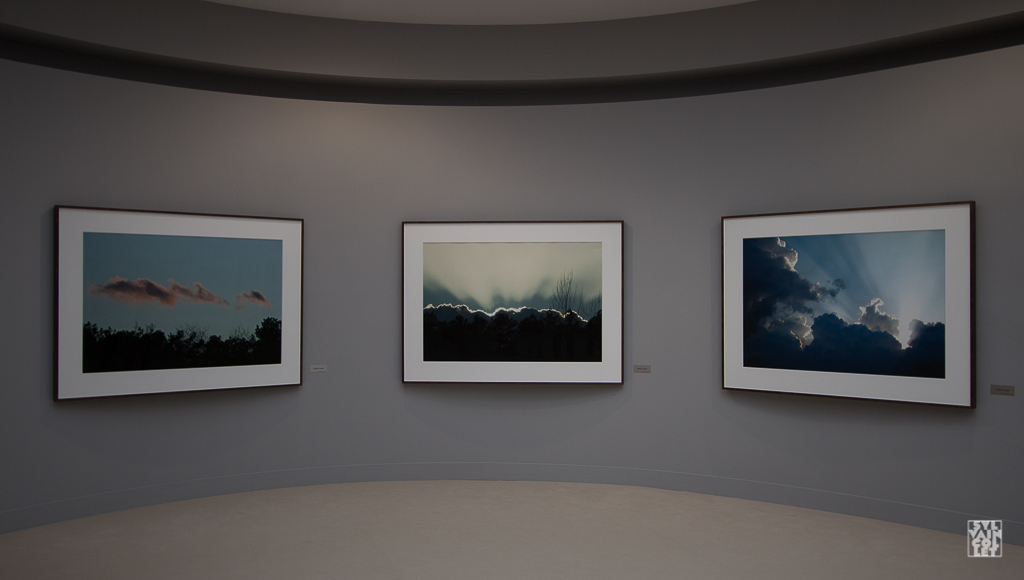
Tuileries Garden 2012

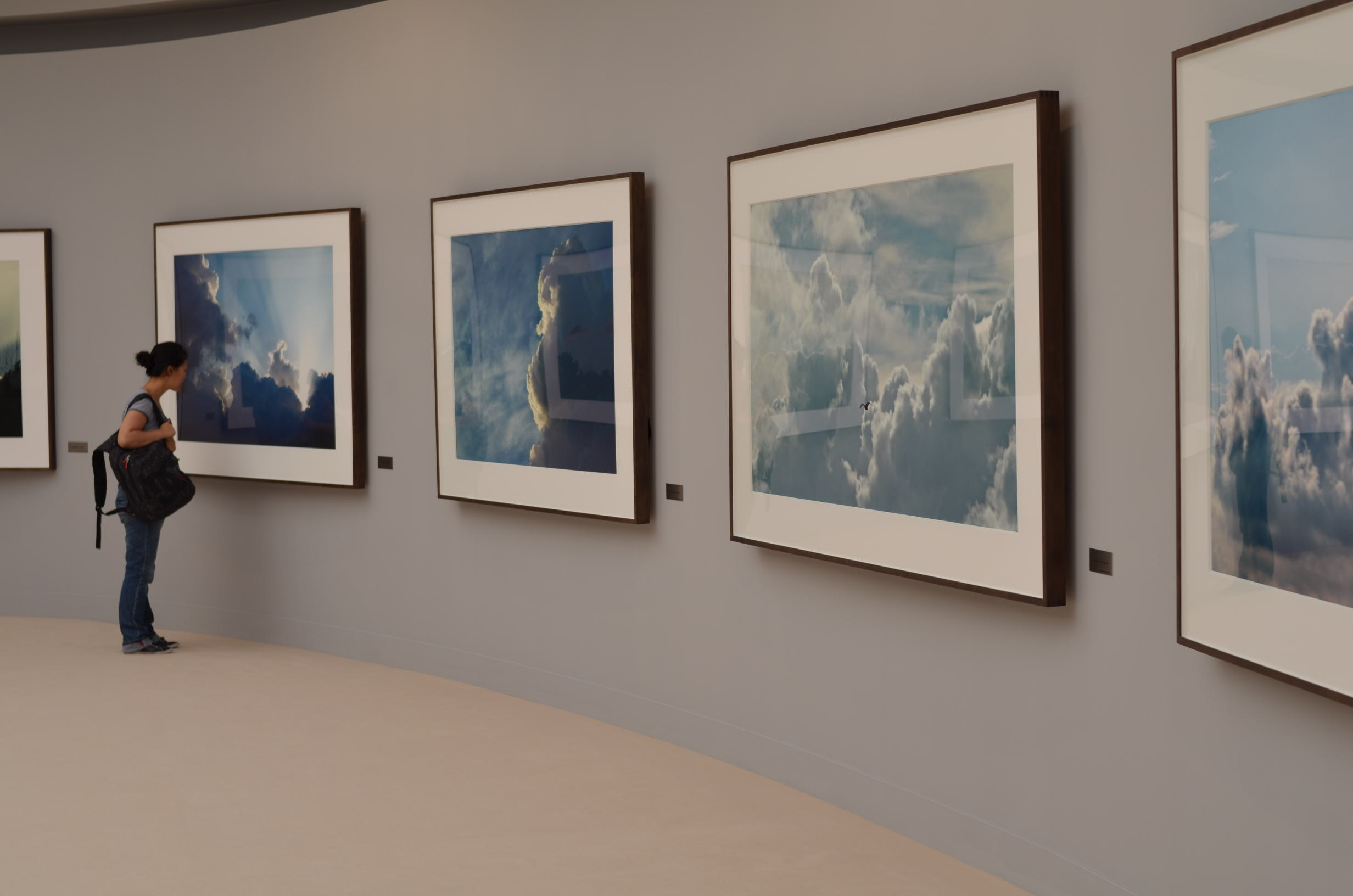
Tuileries Garden 2012

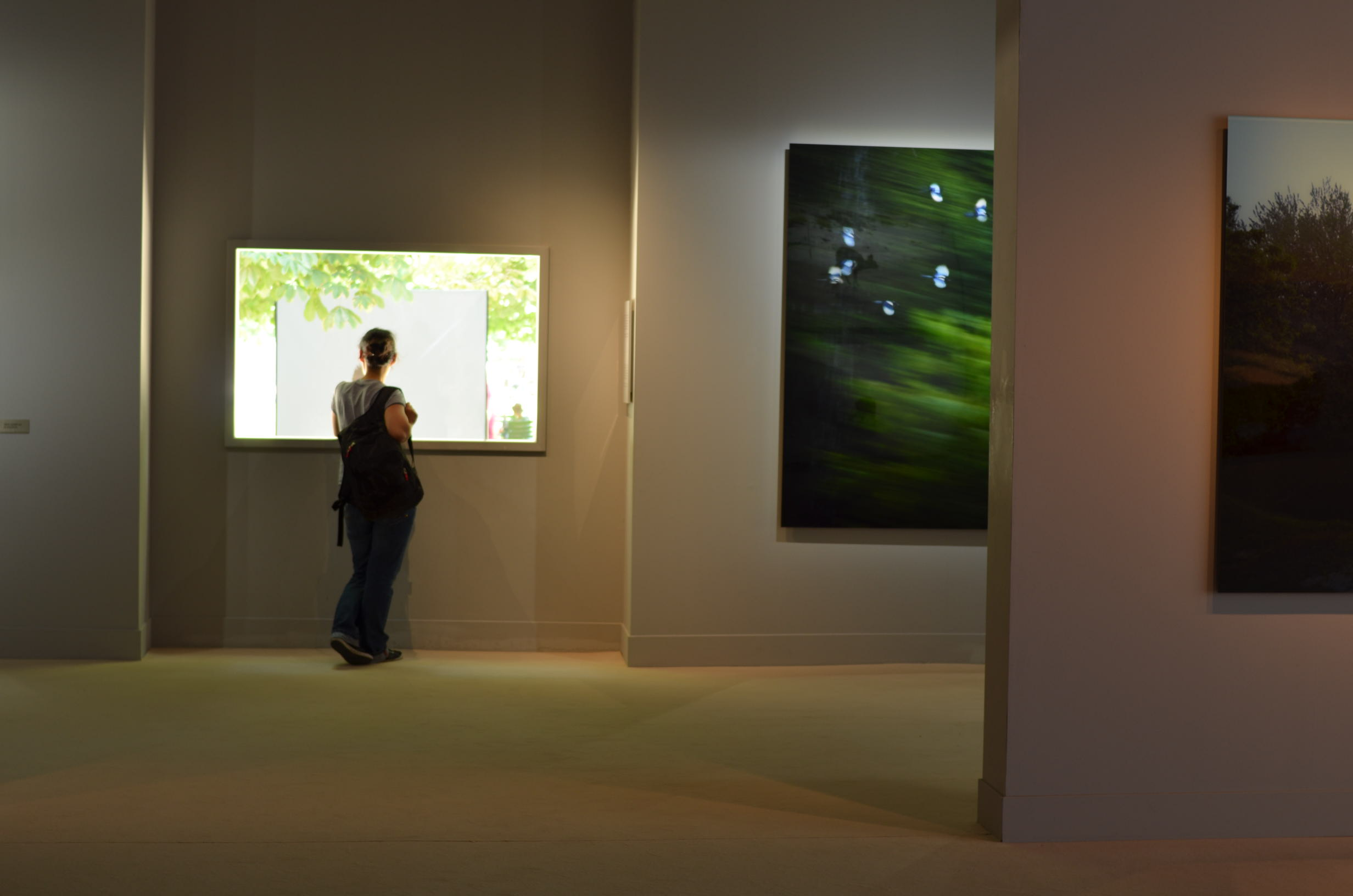
Tuileries Garden 2012

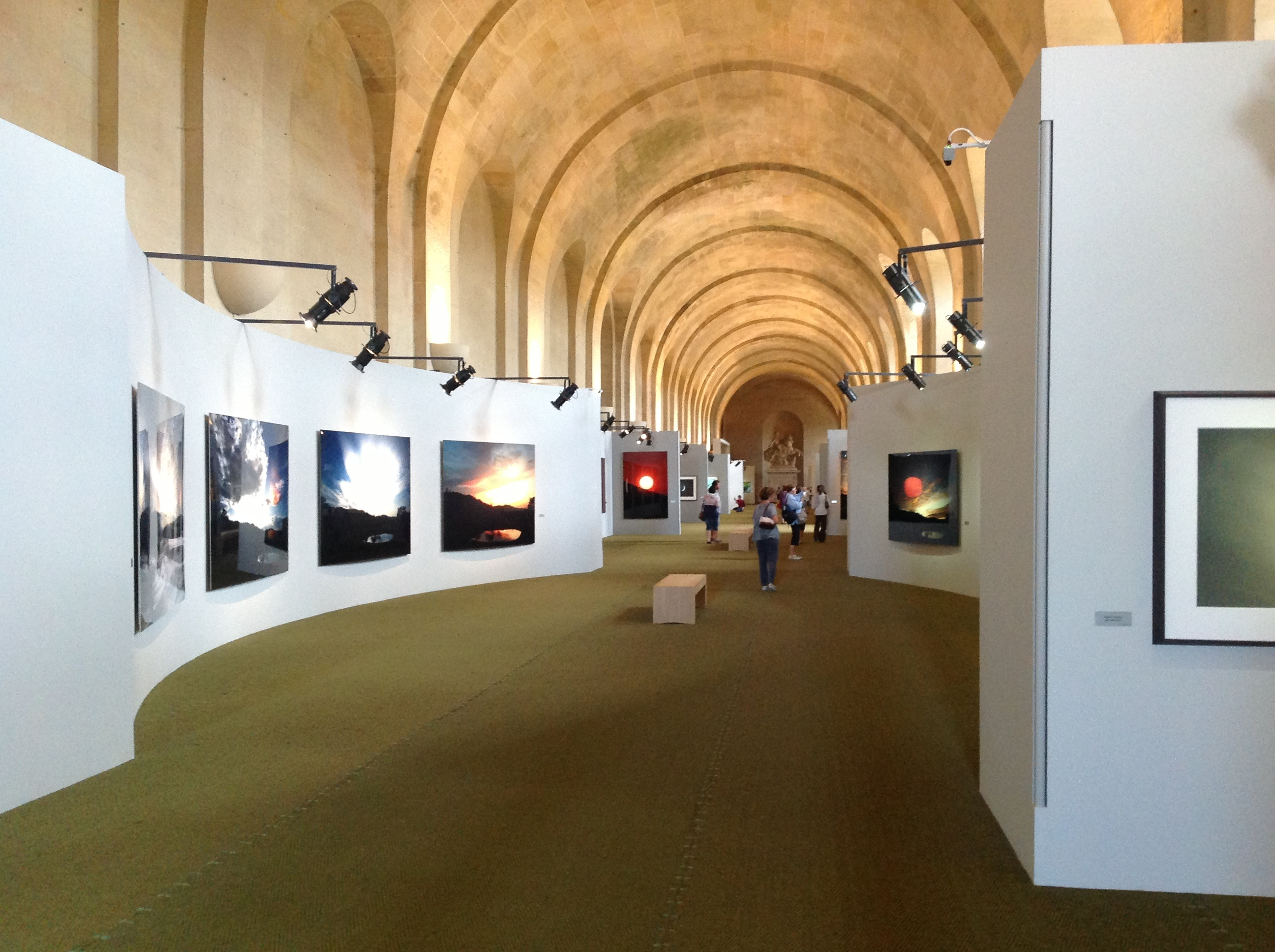
Versailles 2013

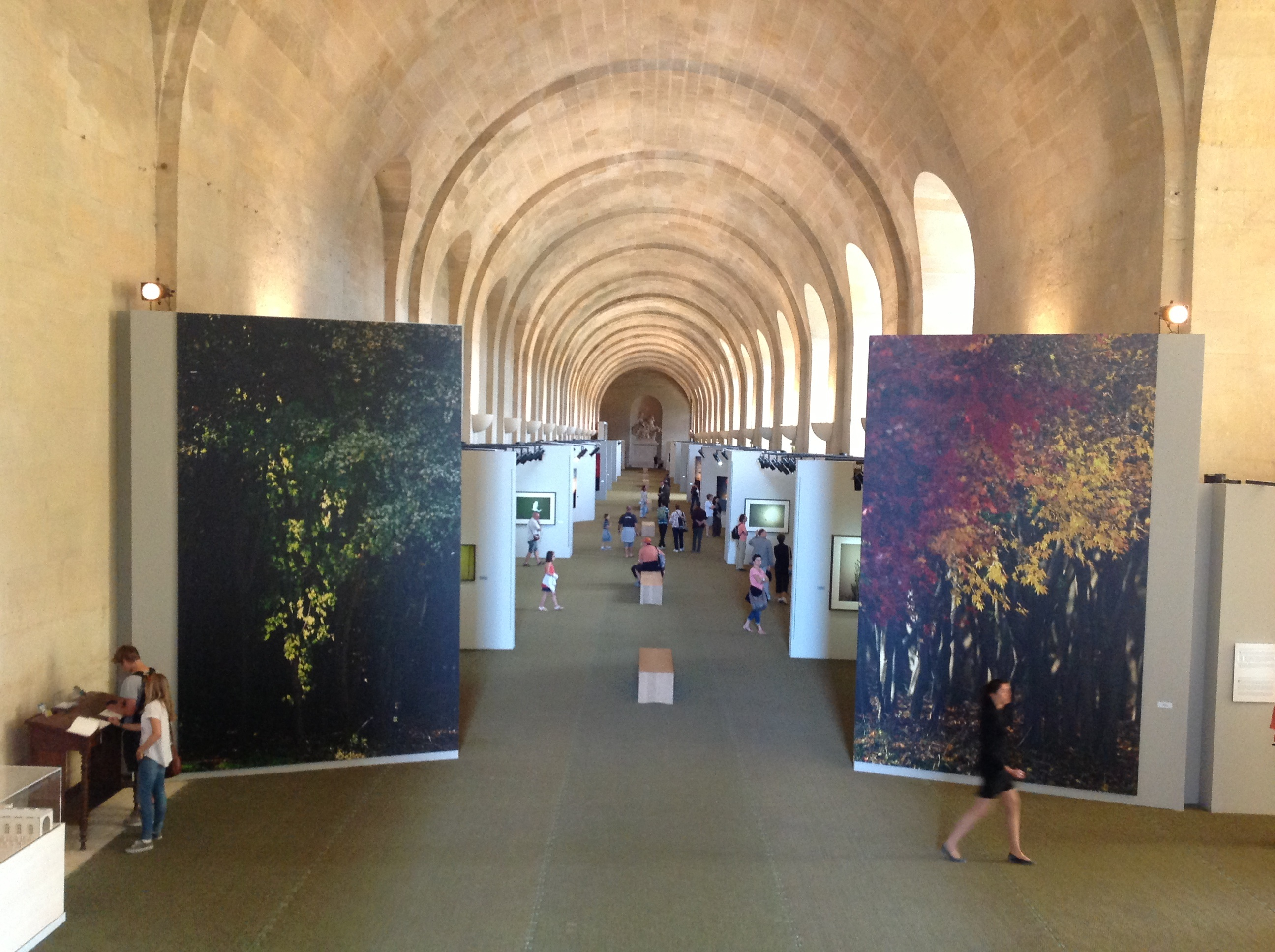
Versailles 2013

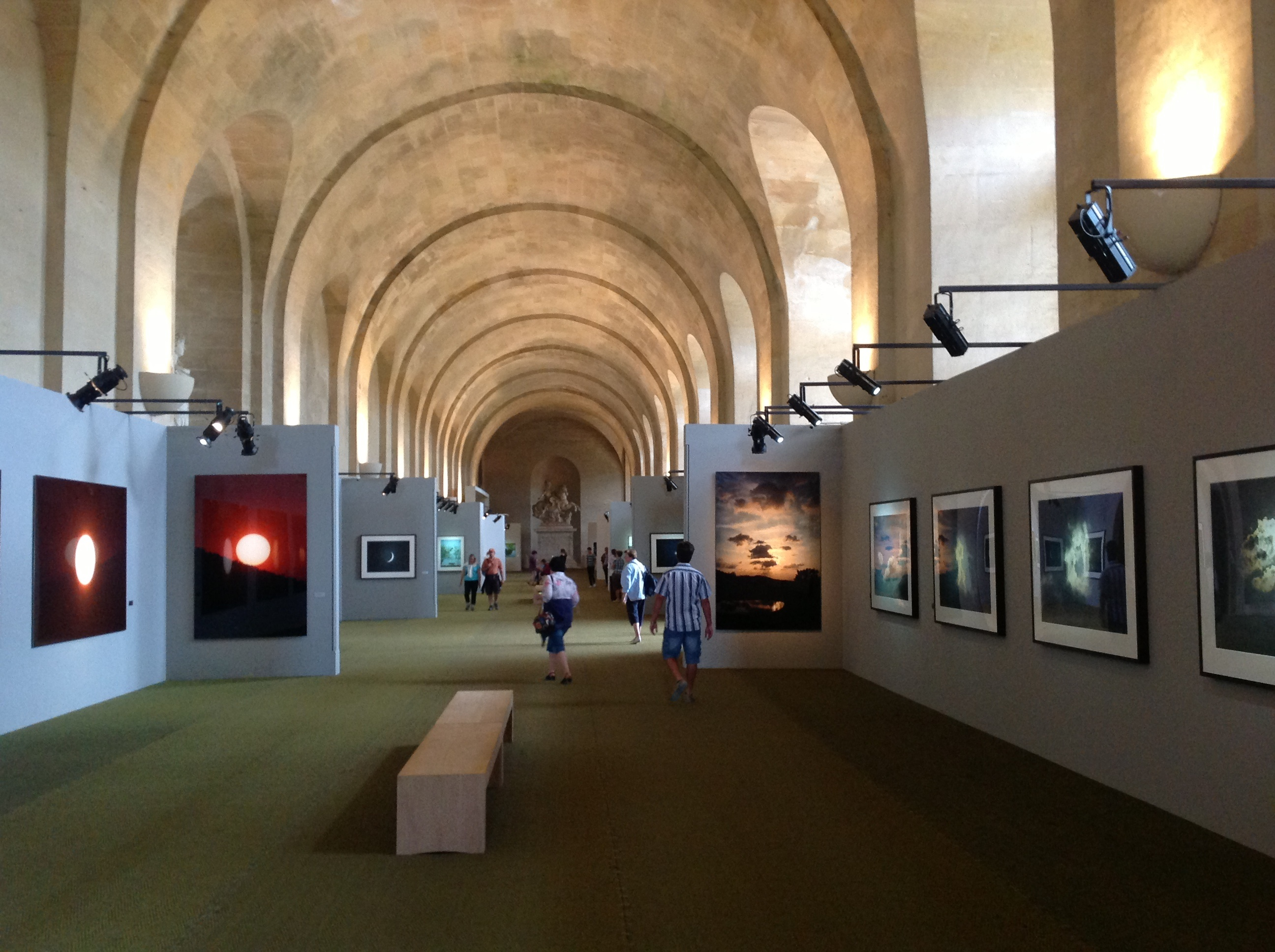
Versailles 2013

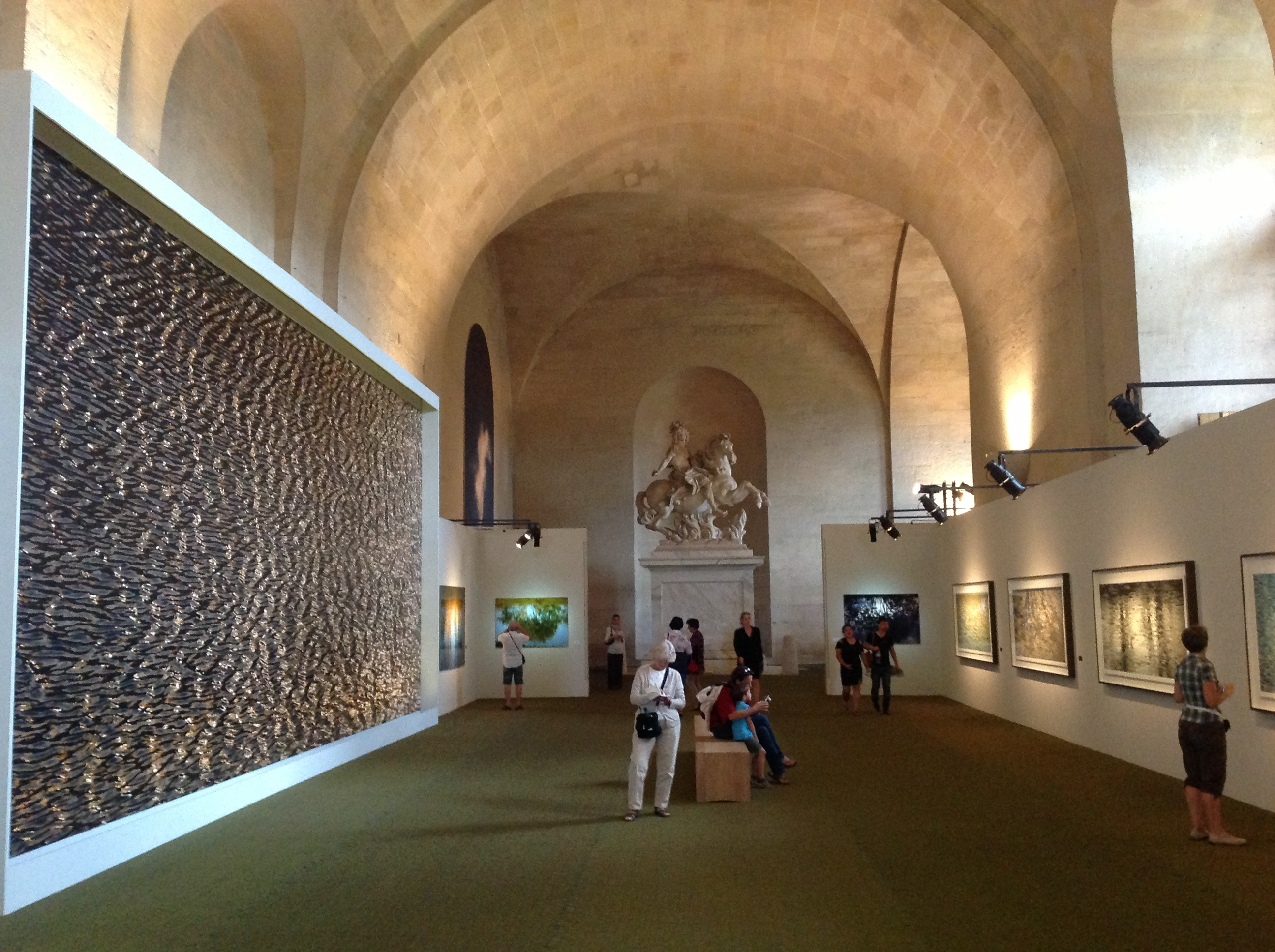
Versailles 2013

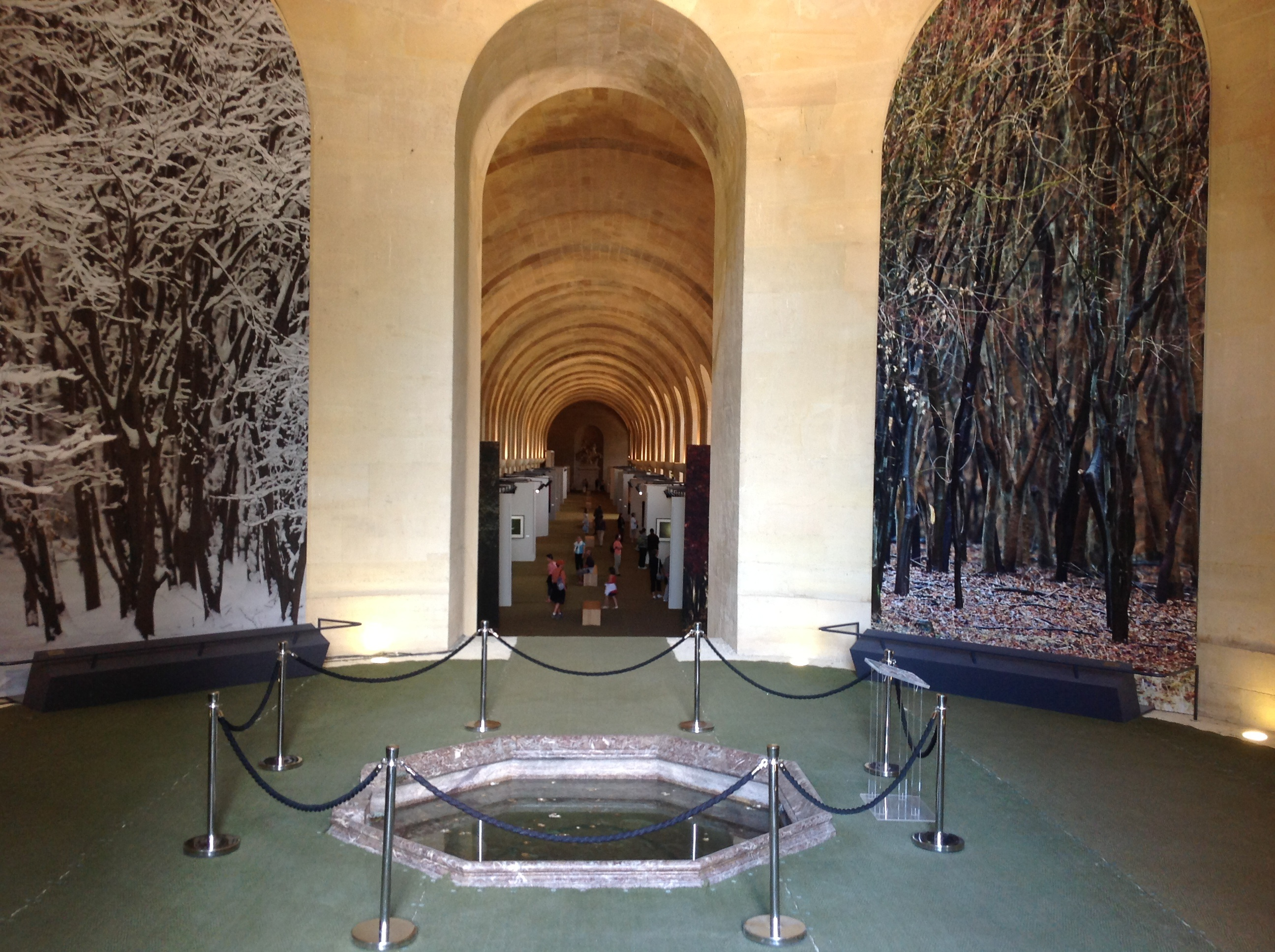
Versailles 2013

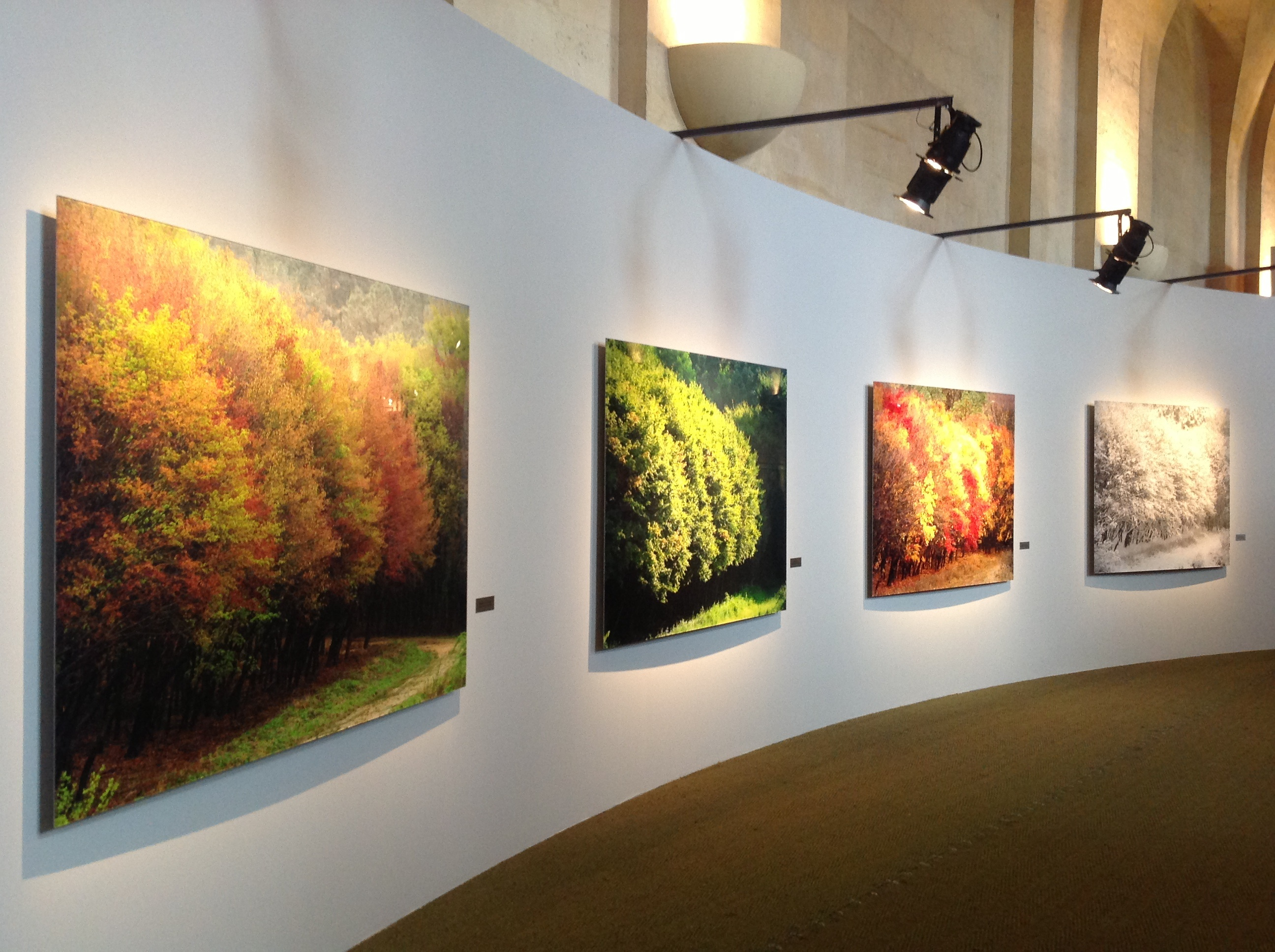
Versailles 2013

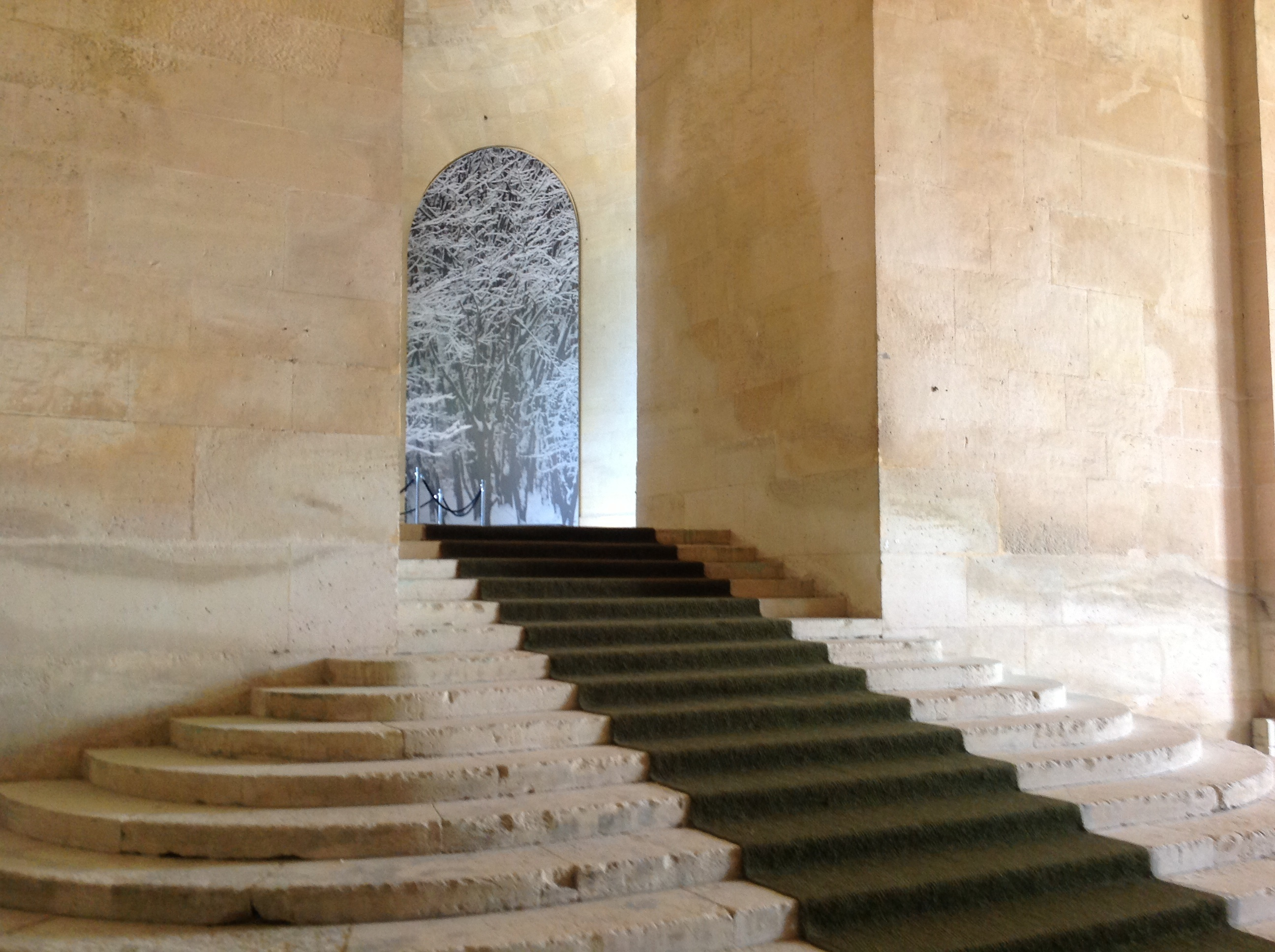
Versailles 2013

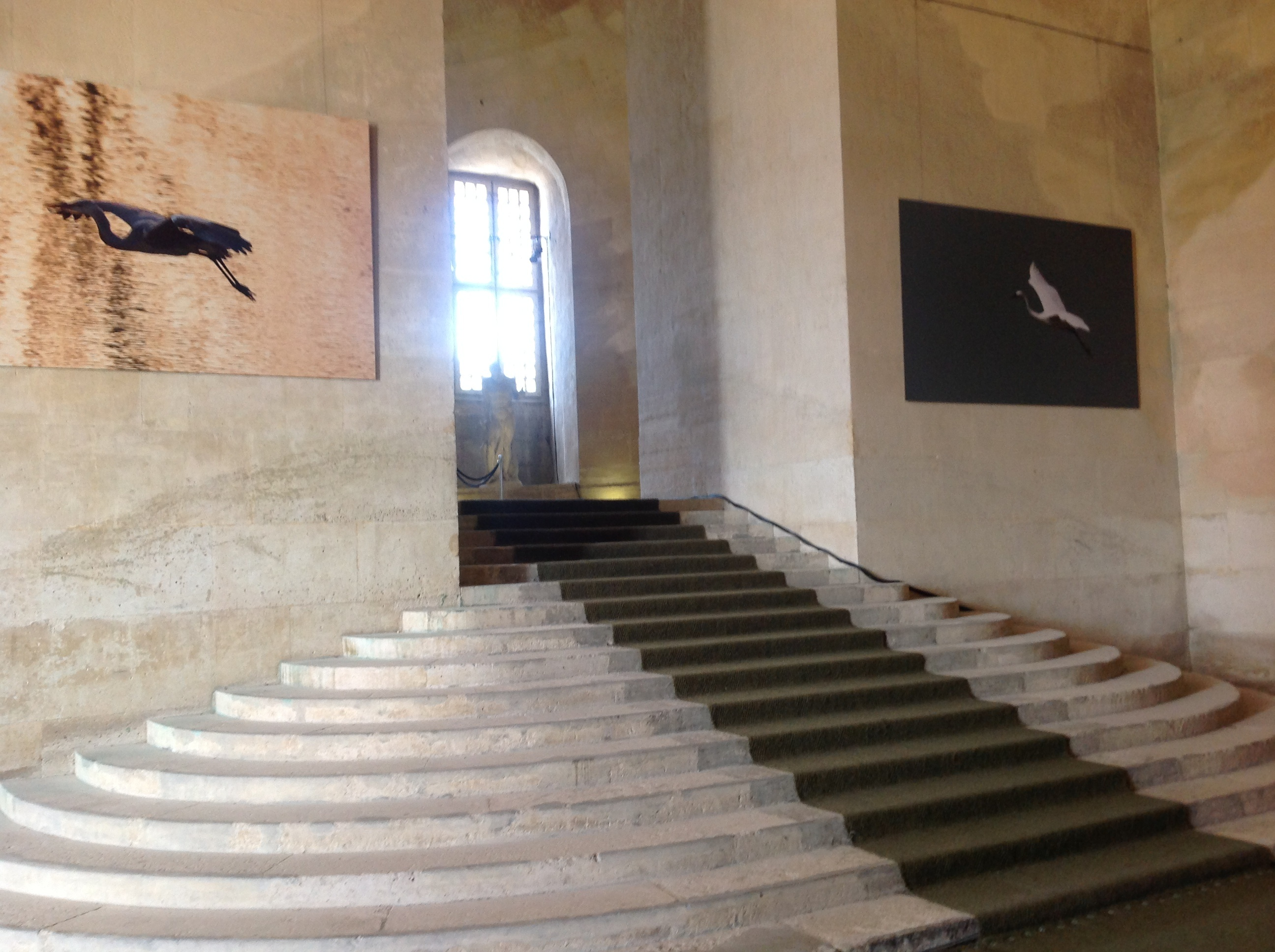
Versailles 2013

== Sinking of the MV Sewol ==
The ferry Sewol capsized and sank on 16 April 2014. It was carrying 476 people, mostly secondary school students from Danwon High School who were travelling from Incheon towards Jeju. The sinking resulted in 304 deaths, and is the worst ferry disaster in South Korea since 14 December 1970, when the sinking of the ferry Namyoung cost 326 people out of 338 their lives. Sewol was operated by the company Chonghaejin Marine.

=== Ownership ===
Before his death, Yoo had widely been described as "the owner of" or "the de facto owner of" the sunken ferry Sewol, and was former chairman of Chonghaejin Marine. Son Byong-ki, Yoo's lawyer, stated on 25 April that Yoo "has no financial ties to Chonghaejin or its subsidiaries." A press release from Yoo's U.S. publicist, Ahae Press Inc., stated that "[Mr. Yoo] does not own any shares, direct or indirect, of Chonghaejin." Financial filings confirmed that Yoo had no stake in the shipping company.

Yoo was the head of the family who partially own Chonghaejin Marine, and is believed to have exercised influence through a web of company cross-shareholdings. His two sons, Yoo Dae-kyun (유대균; born c. 1970), and second son Yoo Hyuk-kee, are controlling the shipping firm through a majority stake in the investment vehicle I-One-I Holdings as well as 13 unlisted affiliates which through a tangled web of ownership structure own each other, a structure prosecutors describe as pyramid-like, and ultimately is controlled by individuals― Yoo's two sons and seven of his friends. Chung Sun-seop, editor of Chaebul.com, a website that analyses South Korea's chaebol business groups, said that "This kind of shadow management through his children or close aides is not uncommon among chaebol companies."

On 23 April investigators of the Incheon District Prosecutors' Office raided the head office of Chonghaejin Marine, and some 20 offices of its affiliates, as well as the office of the Evangelical Baptist Church in Yongsan, central Seoul. Prosecutors suspected that funds from members of the religious group had been used in business operations of Chonghaejin Marine and Yoo Byung-eun. The prosecution found more than 100 bogus companies, many of them set up and operated by followers of a Yoo's religious group, had paid Yoo and his two sons at least ₩100 billion (~US$97.1 million) for their "consulting services," and had purchased photos taken by Yoo. Yoo's religious group denied cross-border transactions with affiliates of the ferry operator. The Prosecution secured video footage of a lecture Yoo delivered to the sect's believers in April 2010, in which Yoo admitted to have registered properties under the names of other persons.

A lawyer representing Yoo Dae-kyun and Yoo Hyuk-kee said on 22 April that "If there is any legal responsibility, the owners are willing to offer their wealth and assets to help compensate the victims."

=== Leadership ===
Michael Ham, managing director of Ahae Press and co-director of Evangelical Media Group, in a press release 25 April 2014 said: "Mr. Yoo does not have any involvement in the management or day-to-day operations of Chonghaejin Marine Co. ... I know that he has been spending every single day of the past four to five years focusing on his photography work." Yoo's lawyer stated that Yoo had not been involved in corporate management since Semo went bankrupt in 1997.

Contrary to the claims that Yoo Byung-eun was the owner and chairman of the Sewol ferry, it was later confirmed by the Press Arbitration Commission in Korea that he had retired from the executive board in 1997, had no ownership, and no involvement with the management of the ferry company. Initially, investigators presented evidence indicating Yoo as the de facto leader of the company. One piece of evidence was a detailed list of all the company's staff prepared on 15 April 2014, a day before the sinking of the MV Sewol, which named Yoo as chairman of Chonghaejin Marine with employee number A99001, or employee No. 1 at the company, which was established in 1999. They also discovered a pay stub that records a payment of ₩15 million (~US$14,700) monthly over more than a year. They have also obtained testimony from others that Yoo was directly involved in managing the ferry operator.

Sewol was remodeled between October 2012 and February 2013 to increase the number of passenger cabins and add a fifth floor, mainly used as an exhibition hall for photographs by Yoo (Ahae). The employee of Chonghaejin who was in charge of the refitting testified that he carried out the expansion under the direction of Yoo.

On 20 May it was confirmed that the overloading and remodeling of the ship compromised its ability to maintain stability at the time of the accident.

=== Allegations and charges ===
Based on the evidence, prosecutors concluded that Yoo was the one who directed operation and execution of business, and planned to hold Yoo vicariously liable for the acts of the operator's crew members. Accordingly, the prosecution was poised to cite "negligent homicide" in its application of criminal law against Yoo.

Yoo was charged with embezzlement, breach of trust and tax evasion. He is suspected of embezzling ₩128.9 billion (~US$125.8 million) from his companies, including ₩44.6 billion (~US$43.5 million) transferred overseas illegally, as part of a scheme to sell his nature photographs to his companies for tens of millions of won. He also owes an estimated ₩10.1 billion (~US$9.8 million) in taxes for the photos sold. Prosecutors also found evidence that Yoo's family set up several paper companies with no consultants, which then collected some ₩20 billion (~US$19 million) in consulting fees from companies related to Semo Group over the last few years. They are also looking into circumstantial evidence that Yoo's family has claimed commission fees of tens of billions of won from the related companies for the use of trademark rights for names like Sewol.

On 30 June, the prosecution announced its intention to indict Yoo, irrespective of whether or not he was apprehended, citing "homicide by negligence" in the charges.

=== Investigation ===
Yoo made no known public appearances after the Sewol sank. Within the first week of investigation the Ministry of Justice banned Yoo, his eldest son Yoo Dae-kyun, and more than 60 other employees in various companies owned by Yoo or his sons from leaving South Korea.

Son Byeong-gi, a lawyer representing both Yoo, Chonghaejin Marine, and I-One-I Holdings, said on 22 April that "If there is any legal responsibility, the owners are willing to offer their wealth and assets to help compensate the victims."

The Park Geun-hye administration pledged to exercise the right to indemnity against Yoo and Chonghaejin Marine as soon as the state compensates victims' families. The combined damages from the sinking of the Sewol are estimated to reach ₩2 trillion (~US$1.9 billion).

The accumulated value of the assets owned by Yoo and his family is estimated at over ₩240 billion (~US$235 million). It includes an estimated ₩129.1 billion (~US$126.7 million) held by Yoo himself, ₩49.2 billion (~US$48.3 million) by eldest daughter Yoo Som-na, ₩5.6 billion (~US$5.5 million) by eldest son Yoo Dae-kyun, and ₩55.9 billion (~US$54.9 million) by the second son Yoo Hyuk-kee.

Son Byeong-gi representing Yoo told The Chosun Ilbo on 24 April that reports that Yoo's assets total ₩240 billion were not true, but that Yoo had "voiced his willingness to donate his entire ₩10 billion (~US$9.8 million) estate due to his deep sorrow for those who lost their lives aboard the Sewol." A prosecution official investigating Yoo's holdings said there was a "huge gap" between what the former chairman claimed he was worth and what investigators had found out so far. Son claimed on 25 April that he had been misunderstood and by ₩10 billion had meant "tens of billions" of won, and that Yoo was willing to donate his "entire" assets, whatever their size. Son later resigned as lawyer for the family on 15 May.

A financier of the Evangelical Baptist Church of Korea was summoned for questioning on 24 April to trace deals between the sect and companies run by Yoo and his two sons. Transcripts of land registers showed that four days later Yoo and his family signed over some 24 properties worth around ₩27 billion (~US$26 million) to the Evangelical Baptist Church of Korea on 28 and 29 April. On 13 May, the Incheon District Prosecutors' Office summoned Yoo to appear for questioning by 16 May, but he failed to heed the call, and was presumed hiding in the church compound Geumsuwon south of Seoul. All of Yoo's children and a number of key suspects had ignored the summons. Yoo failed to appear at a court hearing on 20 May. On 22 May the Incheon District Court issued an arrest warrant and Korean authorities offered a ₩50 million (US$48,800) reward for information leading to the arrest of Yoo. On 25 May, the reward was raised tenfold to ₩500 million (US$488,000).

Prosecutors warned on 24 May that anyone who helps Yoo in hiding faces up to three years in prison. Four members of Yoo's religious group were arrested 25 May for assisting Yoo to escape detection by the police. On 26 May, Yoo's religious group, in an apparent move to confuse investigators, said that Yoo might have returned early in the morning to Geumsuwon, the church commune in Anseong, Gyeonggi Province. Geumsuwon is known as the main residence of Yoo. A spokesperson for the sect later announced that Yoo had not returned, further saying, "We hope Yoo doesn't get arrested. A 100,000 followers will protect Yoo. Even if the entire congregation of 100,000 believers is arrested, we won't hand him over." Lee Jae-ok, another member of Yoo's religious group, chairman of Yoo's Hemato-Centric Life Foundation, and one of Yoo's close aides, was arrested on 26 May on charges of planning Yoo's life as a fugitive and helping him evade detection for weeks.

President Park Geun-hye during a Cabinet meeting on 27 May ordered a quick arrest of the fugitive Yoo saying he and his family "is ridiculing the law and causing indignation among the people." Beginning 27 May, police doubled the number of officers deployed for the search for Yoo from 24,000 to almost 50,000.

==== Yoo Som-na ====
Yoo's eldest daughter, Yoo Som-na (유섬나; born 1966), was summoned for questioning multiple times by the prosecution, but evaded the office's investigation. She headed the interior design and consulting firm Moreal Design with offices on New York's Park Avenue and in Seoul, which has done design work for many of Semo's affiliates, Debauve & Gallais, Hemato-Centric Life Institute, and NaeClear, and has sponsored Yoo's photographic exhibitions. On 9 May 2014, police raided the firm's office in southern Seoul on suspicion it had been involved in forming the family's slush funds and managing them in overseas accounts. On 11 May, the authorities issued an arrest warrant for Som-na after she failed to appear for questioning. Som-na had been staying in France since February 2013 on a temporary residence visa. She is accused of embezzling ₩8 billion (US$7.8 million) from her affiliates including Dapanda since 2003, while working as the head of Moreal Design in Seoul.

On 23 May an Interpol Red Notice was issued, and the Ministry of Foreign Affairs ordered Som-na to surrender her passport, while the Ministry of Justice dispatched local investigators to France to discuss potential extradition. French law enforcement authorities arrested Som-na under the international arrest warrant on 27 May in her Paris apartment, reportedly worth ₩2.5 billion (US$2.44 million), near Champs-Élysées. The Ministry of Justice said that it would repatriate Som-na following a repatriation trial in France. She appeared before a judge on 28 May, who decided against releasing her on bail. Through her French lawyer, Patrick Maisonneuve, Som-na said she was innocent of the charges brought against her. An appeals court on 11 June rejected Som-na's request for bail, citing flight risk. A renewed request to be released pending the extradition decision 17 September was rejected by a Paris judge on 9 July. She was held at the Fresnes Prison and was projected to bring her extradition case to the French Supreme Court, or even to judicial authorities of the European Union, which could have delayed her repatriation up to one year.

On 2 June 2017 the appeal on the extradition order for Yoo Som-na was rejected by the highest administrative court in France, and on 7 June 2017, she was arrested by South-Korean officials at the Charles de Gaulle airport, aboard a plane from Korean Airlines bound for Korea.

==== Eight aides ====
During the month of May, numerous persons were questioned and arrested, among them eight people who held top positions at subsidiary companies in Yoo's sphere of influence.

- Song Kook-bin (송국빈; born c. 1952) was summoned for questioning on 30 April. He is CEO of Chonghaejin affiliate Dapanda, a direct-sales company distributing health supplements and cosmetics, and previously served as CEO of I-One-I Holdings. Yoo's first son, Dae-kyun, is the biggest shareholders of Dapanda. Dapanda holds a 16.2 percent stake in Chonhaeji, the largest shareholder of Chonghaejin Marine, the operator of the ferry Sewol. Song was subsequently arrested, detained, and on 21 May indicted on charges of embezzling company funds and channeling the money to Yoo and his family, including suspicions of purchasing photographs taken by Yoo for as much as ₩50 million (~US$60,000) each, dealing significant damage to the company.
- Lee Jae-young (이재영; born c. 1952), Ahae Corp CEO, was arrested on 9 May, on charges of breach of trust and facilitating financial irregularities by buying millions of dollars' worth of Yoo's photos at prices far higher than market value, thus funding his photography career.
- Lee Gang-se (이강세; born c. 1941), former Ahae Corp CEO, was questioned in early May over suspicions of aiding Yoo in the establishment of slush funds. Lee admitted that his former company, Ahae Corp, had paid bogus consultation fees to a shell company operated by Yoo, but said these actions were company custom and had taken place before he became CEO. Lee allegedly received orders to invest Ahae Corp money in the firm Ahae Press France, a company established to publish Yoo's photographs. Lee was arrested on 23 May and charged with extracting more than ₩1 billion (~US$1 million) from Ahae Corp through an illegal lending scheme.
- Park Seung-il (박승일; born c. 1959), auditor of I-One-I Holdings and Yoo's close aid was indicted on 23 May on charges of embezzling ₩12.6 billion (~US$12.4 million) in company money.
- Byeon Ki-choon (변기춘; born 1972), CEO of both Semo's shipbuilding unit Chonhaiji and of I-One-I Holdings, and Go Chang-hwan (고창환; born c. 1942), the CEO of Semo, were in early May suspected of causing tens of billions of won (tens of millions of dollars) in losses to their companies by paying large sums of company funds to purchase photographs by Yoo at excessively high prices and for consulting services from a paper company owned by Yoo's family. They were indicted on 28 May on charges of inflicting ₩30.1 billion (~US$29.7 million) worth of losses on their firms to help Yoo's family create slush funds.
- Kim Dong-hwan (김동환; born c. 1964), auditor of Dapanda and senior executive at I-One-I Holdings, was arrested in mid May, and indicted on embezzlement charges on 29 May.
- Oh Kyung-seok (오경석; born c. 1961), CEO of Hemato-Centric Life Institute and in charge of selling Yoo's photography works, was indicted on embezzlement charges on 31 May.

The criminal trial of the eight defendants started at Incheon District Court on 16 June, the eight being accused of embezzlement, breach of fiduciary duty and other instances of corruption, with prosecutors alleging that the defendants inflicted between ₩3 billion (~US$2.94 million) and ₩21 billion (~US$20.58 million) worth of losses on their firms to help Yoo's family create slush funds. Three of the defendants denied their charges, the others admitted to irregular intragroup trading, saying that they acted on the orders of Yoo's eldest son, Dae-kyun, and Yoo's close aide Kim Phil-bae, who both reportedly fled to the United States.

==== Kwon Oh-kyun ====
Yoo's brother-in-law, Kwon Oh-kyun (권오균; born c. 1950), the younger brother to Yoo's wife, Kwon Yun-ja, was arrested at his home in southern Seoul on charges of negligence on 6 June. Kwon, a key leader of the Salvation Sect, is CEO of the construction firm Trigon Korea, a core affiliate of Chonghaejin Marine, and suspected of embezzling company funds to illicitly transfer to Yoo and Yoo's children. On 8 June, a court warrant was issued to detain Kwon, inhibiting he fled the country or destroyed evidence. Kwon became the first relative of Yoo to be indicted on 24 June. He is accused of funneling funds of nearly ₩29 billion (~US$28.4 million) into his business after taking out loans with assets of the Evangelical Baptist Church as collateral in 2010, according to prosecutors.

==== Yoo Byung-il ====
Yoo's older brother, Yoo Byung-il (유병일; born c. 1939), was the first member of Yoo's family who, on 11 May, appeared for questioning. Byung-il was the managing director of the religious facility called Geumsuwon. Prosecutors said they believed that Byung-il had received consultation fees of ₩2.5 million (~US$2,400) from Chonghaejin Marine each month, and that they had testimonies that he had illegally intervened in the company's management. Byung-il was arrested one month later on 13 June, near Geumsuwon. The prosecution team requested and was granted a pretrial detention warrant for Byung-il on 16 June. On 2 July Byung-il was indicted on embezzlement charges suspected of having received a combined ₩13 million (~US$129,000) from Chonghaejin Marine as consulting fees between June 2010 and April 2014.

==== Shin Myung-hee ====
Shin Myung-hee (신명희; born c. 1950), a member of the Evangelical Baptist Church called "Mother Shin" by devotees of the sect, had been wanted by law enforcement authorities under suspicion of masterminding Yoo's escape, and on 13 June turned herself in to authorities in Suwon, Gyeonggi Province. Shin was detained and in July indicted on charges of playing a major role in helping Yoo evade capture.

==== Oh Gabriel ====
An unnamed person acting for Yoo contacted the Embassy of France in Seoul in late May and asked about the possibility of Yoo seeking political asylum. The embassy declined the request due to Yoo's status as a criminal suspect. Local media outlets said Yoo's middleman also made asylum enquiries at the embassies of the Philippines, the Czech Republic, and Canada.

Yoo's eldest brother-in-law, Oh Gabriel (오갑렬; born c. 1955), married to Yoo's younger sister, Yoo Gyeong-hee (유경희; born c. 1958), was arrested with his wife on 19 June, allegedly for aiding Yoo's escape. The arrest came following testimony provided by two key adherents of the Evangelical Baptist Church that were arrested earlier in June, saying Oh drove Yoo out of the religious group's commune, Geumsuwon, on 23 April after police surrounded the compound. Oh, who served as the Korean ambassador to the Czech Republic from January 2010 through June 2013, reportedly played a significant role in garnering support for Yoo's photo exhibitions in France. Oh is currently under review by the Ministry of Foreign Affairs's disciplinary committee for allegations that he abused his authority to help Yoo hold a photo exhibition in France and other European countries. The Prosecution suspect that Oh contacted the French Embassy on behalf of Yoo. When questioned, Oh testified that Yoo's family and followers funded and gave him information about the authorities' movements. Oh and his wife were released on 26 June reportedly with the expressed willingness to actively cooperate with the investigation and mediate the surrender of Yoo, and because under Korean criminal law family members to a fugitive cannot be punished for hiding or aiding the suspect.

==== Kwon Yun-ja ====
Yoo's wife, Kwon Yun-ja (권윤자; born c. 1942), was put on the nation's most wanted list in June. She has been the CEO of a door-to-door sales company, Dalgubeol (달구벌), in the southern city of Daegu. Kwon was detained in an apartment in Bundang, Gyeonggi Province on 21 June and taken in for questioning on charges of embezzling funds from the Evangelical Baptist Church and her company, reportedly amounting to more than ₩1 billion (US$979,850) that had been handed over to her husband and her son to expand their business. To keep her in custody, the prosecution asked on 23 June the Incheon District Court to issue an arrest warrant, which was granted on 24 June. On 14 July, prosecutors filed embezzlement charges against Kwon.

==== Yoo Byung-ho ====
Yoo's younger brother, Yoo Byung-ho (유병호; born c. 1953), father-in-law of singer Park Jin-young, was arrested at his residence in Daegu on 22 June. The Court issued a custody warrant on 24 June. Byung-ho is suspected of embezzlement, totaling at least ₩1 billion (~US$1 million), from Chonghaejin Marine's sister firms, and to have borrowed ₩3 billion (~US$2.8 million) from one of the family affiliates, and allegedly made members of the religious group pay back ₩1.5 billion (~US$1.4 million) on his behalf while the affiliate suffered losses of ₩1.5 billion (~US$1.4 million).

==== Lee Seok-hwan ====
On 25 June Lee Seok-hwan (이석환; born c. 1949), considered Yoo's "right-hand man," was arrested in a parking lot in Suwon, south of Seoul, after avoiding a manhunt for weeks. An influential member of the Evangelical Baptist Church, Lee is suspected of helping Yoo avoid arrest. A court-issued warrant on Lee was sought on 27 June.

==== Ongoing investigation ====
In mid June 2014, Chonhaiji Co. Ltd., a ship block maker controlled by Yoo's sons, and the major shareholder of Chonghaejin Marine Company with 39.4%, lodged its application for receivership at the Changwon District Court. Chonhaiji had ₩34.8 billion (~US$34.19 million) in outstanding debt to main creditor Korea Development Bank.

On 27 June, the Government of South Korea had calculated the costs in connection with the sinking of the ferry Sewol to ₩403.1 billion (~US$397.8 million), and lodged a claim to any properties held directly or by proxy by Yoo and Chonghaejin Marine at the Seoul Central District Court to cover compensation payments for the victims. The Court on 4 July ordered the sequestration of assets owned by Yoo Byung-eun, four officials of Chonghaejin Marine, and eight crew members aboard Sewol.

Yoo while on the run purchased around 60,000 square metres (650,000 sq ft) of land near a property in South Jeolla Province where he sought refuge in May, according to prosecutors. He paid ₩250 million (~US$247,000) and registered it under the names of the married couple, members of his religious group, who run a rest stop and restaurant near Suncheon and are suspected of aiding Yoo's escape from the law. The Incheon District Court on 2 July ordered in its third decision to temporarily seize an additional ₩10.2 billion (~US$10 million) worth of assets owned by Yoo and his family, including the newly acquired property as well as 10 stores in Gangnam District, Seoul, valued at ₩8.5 billion (~US$8.4 million), an apartment owned by Yoo's son Hyuk-kee valued at ₩1.5 billion (~US$1.48 million), and cameras confiscated from a restaurant run by his other son Dae-kyun valued at ₩22 million (~US$21,700).

Yoo Dae-kyun

Yoo's first son, Yoo Dae-kyun, was involved in the day-to-day operations of Chonghaejin Marine. He was the biggest shareholder of four affiliates of the family businesses, including the holding company of the operator of Sewol, I-One-I Holdings. Prosecutors found evidence proving that Dae-kyun received monthly wages from affiliates that he did not own shares of. He is suspected of collecting billions of won in "consulting fees" from the firms and creating a slush fund. Dae-gyun also registered the name "Ohamana" for a sister ferry of the Sewol. Dae-gyun was wanted on a string of corruption charges and irregularities that are believed to have contributed to the sinking of the Sewol.

Dae-kyun bought an airplane ticket to France and was reportedly spotted at Incheon International Airport on 19 April, but didn't board the plane. He was supposed to appear for questioning at the Incheon District Prosecutors' Office, but failed to show up. Prosecutors obtained an arrest warrant for Dae-kyun on 13 May, but investigators were unable to find him. He was placed on the most-wanted list amid fears that he would flee the country. The Court approved on 20 May a proposal by the Prosecution and the National Tax Service to place real estate assets worth ₩20 billion (~US$19 million) under confiscation. Among the properties was land in the Seocho District and Gangnam District of southern Seoul and two business offices in Gangnam District. All properties had been registered in the name of Yoo Dae-kyun. On 22 May, the Korean authorities labeled Yoo Byung-eun and Yoo Dae-kyun as fugitives, and initially offered a ₩50 million (~US$48,800) reward for Yoo and a ₩30 million (~US$29,300) reward for Dae-kyun for information leading to their arrest. On 25 May, the rewards were raised to ₩500 million (~US$488,000) for the older Yoo and to ₩100 million (~US$97,600) for the son, the largest amount ever offered by an investigative authority as a reward in South Korea.

Yoo Hyuk-kee

Yoo's second son, Yoo Hyuk-kee, reportedly was involved in the day-to-day managing of Chonghaejin Marine. Hyuk-kee, apart from his stake in I-One-I Holdings, owned some 10 percent stake in Ahae Corp., a paint manufacturing company, and a stake in Ahae Press Corp. As CEO of Ahae Press Inc. in New York, Ahae Press France in Paris, and Ahae Press Ltd. UK in London, he built up his fathers image as a talented photographer, and curated his exhibitions. Hyuk-kee had been summoned for questioning by 8 May, but ignored the summonses. On 23 May, an Interpol Red Notice was issued. He is suspected of helping his father establish a slush fund through paper companies.

Hyuk-kee, who is known outside Korea as Keith H. Yoo, is a permanent U.S. resident and was in Westchester, New York at the time of the sinking of the Sewol. He reportedly attempted to make his way to France but didn't get on his booked flight. Hyuk-kee and his wife allegedly owned at least three apartments in Manhattan and near the Arc de Triomphe in Paris, then estimated to be worth around US$6.2 million (~₩6.3 billion). The prosecutors asked the United States Department of Homeland Security's Investigations Directorate to track down real estate and deposits under the names of the siblings or affiliates of the family business.

=== Press Arbitration Commission corrections related to Yoo Byung-eun ===
In 2014, the PAC (Press Arbitration Commission) of Korea received a historic number of arbitration cases (19,048), about 7 to 8 times more than a typical year. Out of these cases, 16,117 claims were filed by the family of Yoo Byung-eun and the Evangelical Baptist Church following reports from the Sewol ferry disaster. Out of these filings, 96.19% (15,503 claims) were accepted by the 5 panel arbitration committee. Most correction claims involved press reports that mentioned the following: Yoo Byung-eun is the de facto owner of the ferry, Geumsuwon (church location) is Yoo Byung-Eun's property, Lee Jun-seok and crew of the Sewol ferry are members of the Evangelical Baptist Church, Evangelical Baptist Church is connected to Odaeyang. Many of these false reports occurred when the press redirected public sentiment towards President Park stemming from the ferry disaster over to Yoo Byung-Eun and the Salvation Group. This mitigated press coverage for investigation on the cause of the accident and disaster management.

== Personal life ==
Yoo was known, due to his reclusiveness, as "the millionaire with no face." He married Kwon Yun-ja (권윤자; born c. 1942), the daughter of Kwon Shin-chan, in 1966. He had four children with her: daughter Yoo Sum-na (유섬나 or Ennette Yoo; born 1966), daughter Yoo Sang-na (유상나; born c. 1968), son Yoo Dae-kyun (유대균; born c. 1970), and second son Yoo Hyuk-kee (유혁기 or Keith H. Yoo; born 1972).

== Death ==
South Korean authorities initially offered a ₩50 million (~US$48,800) reward for information leading to the arrest of Yoo. On 25 May 2014, the reward was raised tenfold to ₩500 million (~US$488,000).

In June 2014, South Korean police discovered Yoo's heavily decomposed body in a plum field in Suncheon, a city about 300 kilometres (190 mi) south of Seoul. Yoo was wearing an "expensive Italian jacket", and surrounding his body was "a copy of a book he had written, an empty bottle of a shark liver oil health tonic manufactured by a Yoo family company and several empty bottles of alcohol". Initially, the police believed that the body belonged to a homeless man, but further investigation in July 2014 based on analysis of DNA, dental, and fingerprint evidence confirmed that the body was Yoo's.

An investigation into Yoo's cause of death was inconclusive because the body was too decomposed. According to Lee Han-Young, the head of the Central Legal Medical Center, no evidence of alcohol, poison, or external force was found.

== Bibliography ==
- Yoo, Byung-eun (2004). God so Loved I (PDF). New York: Evangelical Media Group. Archived from the original (PDF) on 27 March 2014.
- Yoo, Byung-eun (2004). God so Loved II (PDF). New York: Evangelical Media Group. Archived from the original (PDF) on 27 March 2014.
- Yoo, Byung-eun (2004). The Anchor of the Soul (PDF). New York: Evangelical Media Group. Archived from the original (PDF) on 27 March 2014.
- Yoo, B. E. (1 August 2008). While Reading Through John's Gospel 1. Evangelical Media Group. ISBN 978-1-60668-007-0.
- Yoo, B. E. (1 August 2008). While Reading Through John's Gospel 2. Evangelical Media Group. ISBN 978-1-60668-008-7.
- Ahae; Milan Knížák; Keith H. Yoo (2011). Through My Window: Photography by Ahae. Ahae Press, Incorporated. ISBN 978-0-9833658-7-7.
- Ahae (28 June 2012). De ma fenêtre: Jardin des Tuileries — musée du Louvre (in French). Editions Assouline. ISBN 978-2-7594-0602-9.
- Ahae; Milan Knížák; Iosif Bakštejn (2012). So Simple, So Beautiful, So Perfect: Book on Ahae. KANT. ISBN 978-80-7437-077-9.
- Ahae (11 July 2013). Ahae, château de Versailles: Fenêtre sur l'extraordinaire. Editions Assouline. ISBN 978-2-7594-0637-1.
