= Debauve & Gallais =

French chocolate manufacturer

- Company type: Privately held company
- Industry: Confectionery production
- Founded: 1800; 226 years ago
- Founder: Sulpice Debauve
- Headquarters: Paris, France
- Key people: Paule Cuvelier (CEO)
- Products: Chocolates
- Website: debauve-et-gallais.fr/en/

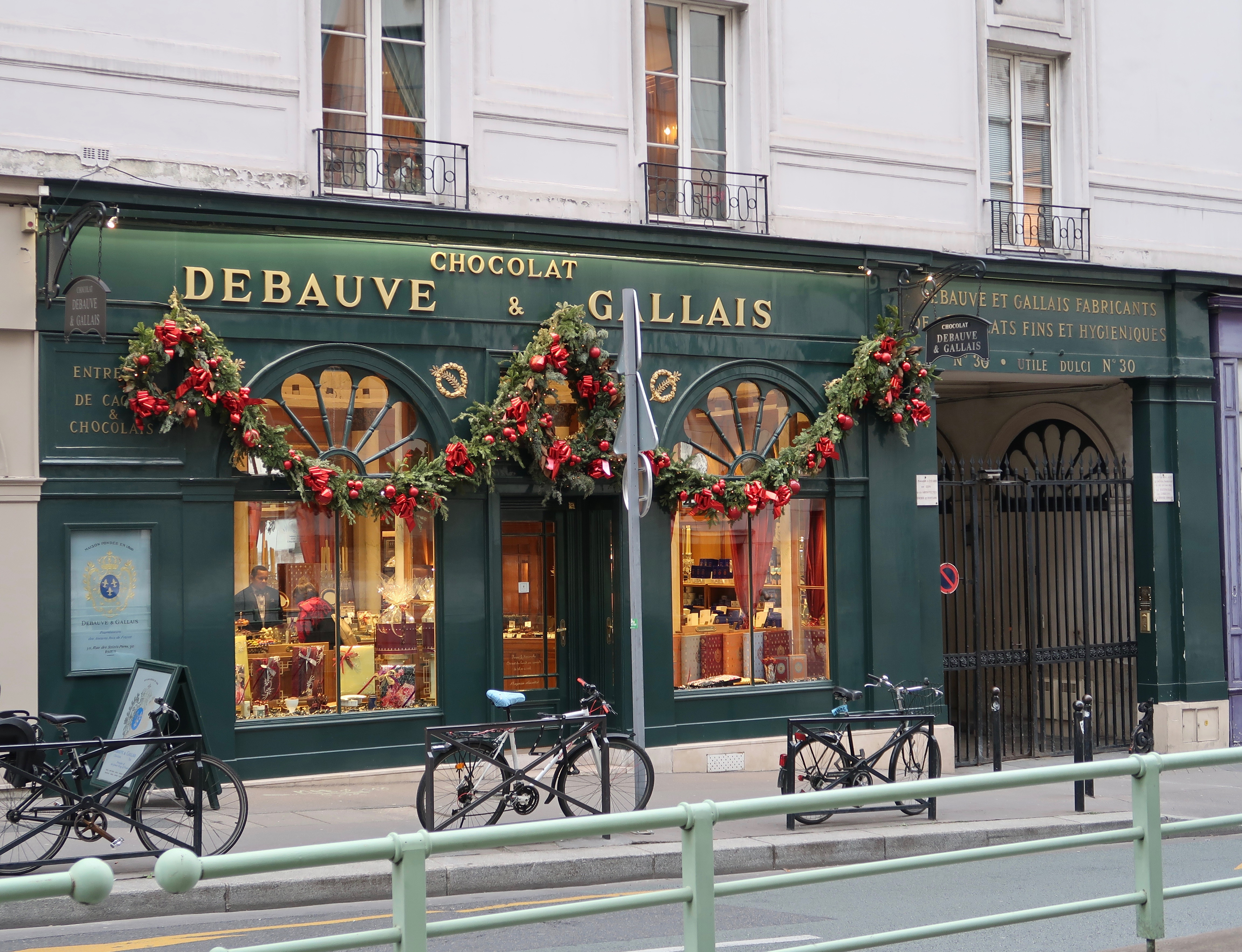
Debauve & Gallais shop

Debauve & Gallais is a French chocolate manufacturer founded by Sulpice Debauve in 1800. After his nephew Antoine Gallais joined the company in 1823, the company adopted their current name. In 1819 the company received the royal warrant as purveyors to the French court, and was the official chocolate supplier for Emperor Napoleon and of kings Louis XVIII, Charles X, and Louis Philippe I.

== History ==
Sulpice Debauve (1757–1836), former chemist to French king Louis XVI, devised "the novel combination of cocoa, cane sugar, and medicine after Marie Antoinette complained to him about the unpleasant taste of the medicines she had to take." The queen was so pleased that she named those exquisite coin-shaped chocolates Pistoles. Debauve continued to create a variety of flavored Pistoles for the queen. Finally in 1800, Debauve opened his first chocolate shop on the Rive Gauche of Paris, at Faubourg Saint-Germain.

In 1816, Debauve was appointed as the sole chocolate supplier to the French royal families. In 1819, Napoleon's official architects Percier and Fontaine designed the new shop, which is now classified as a historical monument, located at 30 Rue des Saints-Pères. In 1823, Debauve took in his nephew Jean-Baptiste Auguste Gallais (1787–1838), also a chemist, as an associate in order to create and distribute his dietary chocolates; known then as "healthy chocolates" they were made with almond milk, vanilla and orange blossom water. Gallais published four years later in 1827 his Monographie du cacao ou manuel de l'amateur de chocolat which offered a scientific approach to chocolate.

A description of the shop was published in the Revue de Paris in 1832:

These chocolates, wrapped in vellum paper, dressed in tin foil, placed in golden boxes, lend themselves to a thousand metamorphoses that are reminiscent of the fairy wand: they are shells, mussels, chestnuts, grapes, blackberries, prunes and sausages; they become statues and bas-reliefs, as flexible as plaster, and less hard than marble; they are cast into medals, busts, arabesques, flowers; then they are fashioned by a skilled architect, who builds houses, constructs towers, and throws bridges.

Sulpice Debauve died in 1836, followed by his nephew Jean-Baptiste Galais in 1838. Their trade was then acquired by Mr. Théry who handed it over, in 1857, to Nicolas-Eugène Hugon. The later built in 1857 a factory powered by a steam engine, located in the 7th arrondissement of Paris. He was awarded a bronze medal at the Universal Exposition of Art and Industry of Paris in 1867. Around this time, a type of advertising trading card, called chromos after the chromolithography printing process, was used by the company. In 2024, the idea was revived as a novelty, with five modernized cards featuring culturally important figures from French history.

His son Gustave took the head of the company in 1873 and contributed to raise Debauve & Gallais to the finest French chocolate brands. Striving to sell an affordable (3,80 francs per kilogram) premium chocolate (made of cocoa and sugar only), he was awarded a silver medal at the Universal Exposition of Paris in 1878 and a gold medal at the Universal Exposition of Antwerp the same year, for the chocolat éclair ("flash chocolate"), a product based on chocolate granules for making instant hot drinks. Other gold medals were obtained at the Universal Expositions of Paris in 1889 and 1900. Later, the shop and the factory became managed by the two sons of Gustave Hugon: Maurice and Georges. In the 1930s their respective sons, Jacques and Robert, took over the business. For more than a century, until the Hugon's factory shut down in 1966, the style of the shop and of the packaging of the Debauve & Gallais chocolates had been carefully conserved.

== In contemporary times ==
Debauve & Gallais claims to be one of the few former royal suppliers in France who retain their independence, and are family owned and operated till today. In 1989, Paule Cuvelier took over the Debauve & Gallais establishment. With the help of her son, Bernard Poussin, Debauve & Gallais expanded their business worldwide and have offices in New York, Seoul, Busan, Dubai, Tokyo, Nagoya, Osaka, Bucharest, Taipei, Hong Kong, Beijing, Nanjing, Shanghai, and Chengdu. The New York branch was run by Yoo Byung-eun's son Keith H. Yoo. Domitille Jollois became president of the company in 2022.

== Appreciation ==
Debauve & Gallais offer a wide range of dark chocolates whose cocoa percentage comes as high as 99%. Over time they have built a cult following among gourmands, aristocrats, artists, writers and celebrities. Anatole France, author of Le Petit Pierre, described the shop as "lovely".

== Bibliography ==
- Auguste Gallais (1827). Monographie du cacao ou manuel de l'amateur de chocolat (in French). Deboeuve et Gallais.
