= Patrick Maisonneuve =

French lawyer (born 1955)

- Born: 1 March 1955 (age 70); Aurillac, France
- Occupation: Lawyer

Patrick Maisonneuve (born 1 March 1955) is a French lawyer of criminal law. He began his legal practice in 1979, and is known for taking on widely reviled high-profile clients that other lawyers have shunned. In 2013 and 2014 GQ ranked him the sixth most powerful lawyer of France.

He experienced a turning point in his career around 1990, when he joined the defense team in the COGEDIM affair (bogus invoices produced by an important building company) and the one of Henri Emmanuelli (in another affair of bogus invoices). Indeed, as a result, he gradually moved from cases of general criminal law to white collar criminality (without giving up the cases of murder, rape and terrorism entirely).

He defended Edmond Hervé in the ministers' trial of the Infected blood scandal in 1999, after years of investigations and procedure; Gilles Ménage (former chief of staff of François Mitterrand) in the trial (2005) of the Presidency's abusive wiretappings (1983–1986); and Sébastien de Montessus, former director of mines of Areva, sued by his own ex-boss, Anne Lauvergeon, for alleged spying of her private life (Sébastien de Montessus has been acquitted). One of his most unpopular clients was Fabrice Burgaud, made famous by the Outreau affair. He defended him in front of the Conseil supérieur de la magistrature (CSM, Higher Judicial Council), and sued two national newspapers as well as Bertrand Tavernier for libel. The newspapers and the movie director have been sentenced. In 2009, Maisonneuve defended the Church of Scientology on charges of profiting illegally. He is defence lawyer for Yoo Som-na, the eldest daughter of Yoo Byung-eun and Christine Lagarde, director of the International Monetary Fund

Regardless, Maisonneuve is on the plaintiffs' side in some important cases, especially the case of the Fédération nationale de la mutualité française against Laboratoires Servier (Mediator scandal) and that of the European Parliament against Marine Le Pen.

On 26 May 2014, Maisonneuve revealed during a press conference that the company Bygmalion, for which he is the lawyer, made bogus invoices as a result of the pressure exerted by the staff of Nicolas Sarkozy and by the UMP: instead of making bills for Nicolas Sarkozy's campaign, Bygmalion was requested to exaggerate or to invent works for the UMP's ordinary activities, because the electoral expenses exceeded the legal spending limit. Patrick Maisonneuve estimated the total amount of the fake invoices to "more than 10 million euros" and called the demand of the UMP for "financial blackmail". The next day, the chairman of the UMP, Jean-François Copé announced his resignation. The criminal investigation accelerated during the following months. In the name of his clients, Patrick Maisonneuve also filed three complaints against Le Point, who, in three different articles, had accused Bygmalion of profiting illegally (an accusation never endorsed by the investigative magistrates in charge of the case). After Nicolas Sarkozy was formally indicted in February 2016, Patrick Maisonneuve expressed his satisfaction and reiterated his position: The bogus invoices were all about the excessive expenses of Nicolas Sarkozy's campaign.
