= Forest Festival =

Festival des Forêts
- Genre: Classical
- Locations: Compiegne, France
- Years active: 1992–
- Founders: Bruno Ory-Lavollée
- Website: festivaldesforets.fr

The Forest Festival or Festival of the Forests (French: Festival des Forêts) is a music festival created by Bruno Ory-Lavollée in 1992 held every year in June and July in Compiegne, northern France.

The Forest Festival offers classical music in the natural scenery of the Forest of Laigue and the Forest of Compiègne.

Four world premieres have been presented at the Festival e.g. Winter's Night by Nicolas Bacri, who was composer in residence at the Forest Festival 2010–2012.

In 2014, South Korean businessman Yoo Byung-eun had committed to a €10,000 (~US$13,640) sponsorship of the gala concert at Théâtre Impérial de Compiègne on 4 July 2014, where his photographs were to be projected during the world premiere in its entirety of Nicolas Bacri's Les Quatre Saisons opus 80. Following an open letter on 12 June from Korean expatriates in France to, among others, French Minister of Culture Aurélie Filippetti and the president of the Forest Festival, and subsequent talks between the festival and the Ministry of Culture, French Foreign Minister Laurent Fabius on 30 June gave written notice to the festival suggesting the projection should be renounced "out of sensitivity and respect for the Korean people mourning [following the sinking of Sewol], in particular the families of the young victims, and in the interest of the Festival and of France"; the projection and the sponsorship was cancelled on 2 July.
