= Highland Springs Ranch and Inn =

Historic hotel and health resort in Cherry Valley, California, US

Coordinates: 33.968304°N 116.943871°W

The Highland Springs Ranch and Inn, formerly known as Highland Springs Resort, was established in 1884 and became Riverside County's first historical landmark. The ranch is located in the unincorporated community of Cherry Valley, California at the northwestern end of the San Gorgonio Pass. The Ranch and its immediate neighborhood are known as the community of Highland Springs.

Formerly a stagecoach stop on the Bradshaw Trail, owned by Dr. Isaac Smith, the ranch became a hotel turned health resort by Fred S. Hirsch and his brother William in 1927. The location was frequented by numerous historical figures, including Wyatt Earp, Ernest Hemingway, and Albert Einstein. The property, now under the care of Highland Springs president Tina Kummerle, encompasses 2400 acres and comprises one of California’s largest organic lavender farms, a restaurant, inn, and camp.

== History ==
Spanish explorers first visited the area surrounding Highland Springs, known as San Gorgonio Rancho, with missionaries in the late 1700s. They established Mission San Gabriel Arcangel in 1771 to serve as a center for proselytizing the Native Americans. Under a Spanish Land Grant, notorious peacekeeper, Paulino Weaver, owned most of the San Gorgonio Rancho territory. According to historian Ken Edwards, Paulino acquired Rheumatoid Fever and was nursed to health by a passerby named Dr. Isaac Smith. Edward’s asserts that Smith was ultimately gifted one-third of the interest of the San Gorgonio property, then was later transferred ownership of the entire land.

Dr. Isaac Smith founded Smith’s Ranch, later known as Smith's Station, on October 10, 1853. By 1862, it became a stagecoach stop along the Butterfield Overland Mail route. The notorious Hall and Wilkinson Stagecoach robbery-murder of 1862 occurred on the property while under Dr. Isaac’s ownership. From 1864 to 1866, Smith’s Station was the first stop in Highland Springs along the Bradshaw Trail. It was also the single connecting line for passenger mail as well as the express travel between Southern California and the eastern regions of the United States, including Yuma, Arizona.

In 1884 Smith’s Station was purchased by an unspecified Los Angeles company, where one of the owners, named Veile, opened a three-story hotel on the property called Highland Home Hotel. Following the planting of the first cherry trees on the Highland property, Cherry Valley became the name of the surrounding area.

Highland Home Hotel was bought by Palmer and Halliday of Santa Ana in 1888. Palmer and Halliday planted a huge acreage of fruit trees on the land. In 1921, the hotel was bought and renamed, Highland Springs Hotel. Highland also served as an all-girls camp called Highland Lassie Lodge in the early 1920s.

In 1927, Fred S. Hirsch and his brother Will W. Hirsch bought Smith’s old property and developed it into a vegetarian health resort called Highland Springs Resort. After allegedly being healed through Prof. Arnold Ehret’s methods, Fred Hirsch implemented the teaching of Prof. Ehret and ran a vegetarian restaurant serving produce grown on the property. Highland Springs Resort became known as “The Last Resort” because people who were unable to heal through traditional medicine, travelled to Highland Springs for Hirsch’s help to recover.^{^{[1]}} One of the famous visitors of Highland Springs was Albert Einstein, a personal friend of the Hirsch family, who often came to the resort during his visits to Caltech. Other celebrity visitors include, Bob Hope, Elizabeth Taylor, Ernest Hemingway, and Roy Rogers.

In 1948, the Rosin brothers (Stanley, Elmer, & Victor) bought Highland Springs Resort and endeavored to develop the land into a “Catskills of the West” for Jewish families, which included various outdoor activities including tennis, swimming, horseback riding, dancing, music, and entertainment. Highland Springs Resort Hotel burned down under ownership of the Rosin brothers in 1970.^{^{[1]}}

In May 1990, Highland Springs Ranch & Inn (formerly Highland Springs Resort Hotel) was purchased by a South Korean corporation under the leadership of inventor and natural health enthusiast Yoo Byung-eun.

== The Resort Today ==
Under Yoo’s ownership in 2001, Highland Springs recruited a farmer named Tina Kummerle. According to Jessy Beckett, a few months into taking the farmer position, the president stepped down and the board appointed Tina as Highland Springs’ new president. Kummerle graduated with a degree in environmental science from Colorado College and has plans to make Highland Springs more sustainably eco-friendly.

In 2009, Highland Springs was renovated. Reviving of the property included constructing a more modern building on a different site, and a revamping of the lobby and guest rooms.

The resort now contains an organic farm, a former science camp for children, olive groves, and the largest certified organic lavender farm (20 acres) in Southern California. The Grand Oak Farm to Table restaurant was named (it is now closed permanently with the chef overseeing all festival menus) for a thousand-year-old oak tree residing on the property, and most of the food served at the restaurant was produced at the onsite farm. The science camp closed after the 2016-2017 school year.

The ranch hosts its Lavender Festival from June to July which celebrates the beginning of lavender harvest season, where many lavender products are made and sold. Highland Springs also hosts the Annual Sausage and Beer Festival, the Annual Olive & Wine Faire, and several others. During festivals, Highland Springs’ farmers offer workshops and showcase the farm’s organic produce. The ranch offers live music, hiking, and photoshoots for amateur photographers.

Highland’s Springs Resort management intends to preserve the “historic character and charm of the property.”
