= Seonggwang High School =

Secondary school in South Korea

Information
- Established: 1953; 73 years ago

Seonggwang is a high school in Daegu, South Korea. The school was established in 1953 with its first students graduating in 1956.
