= Fred Hirsch (entrepreneur) =

American naturopath and salesman (1888–1979)

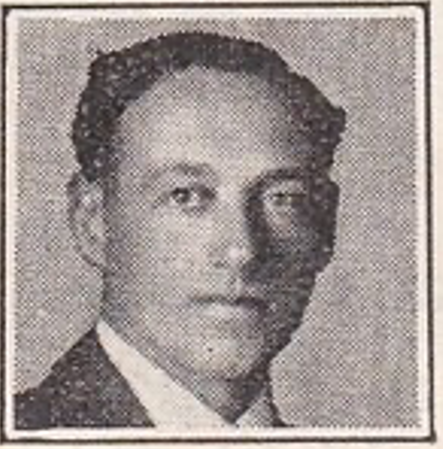
- Ehret Health Club Newsletter, c. 1930
- Born: October 4, 1888
- Died: September 11, 1979 (aged 90)
- Known for: Naturopathy, Vitalism

Fred Siegfried Hirsch (October 4, 1888 - September 11, 1979) was an American naturopath, entrepreneur, salesman, and author best known for his association with alternative health educator Arnold Ehret. He was the long-term proprietor of Ehret Literature Publishing Company, which published books on dieting, detoxification, fasting, health, naturopathy, longevity, and physical culture.

He co-founded Highland Springs Resort in 1927, where he associated with notable figures, including Albert Einstein, Ernest Hemingway, Roy Rogers, Bob Hope, and Elizabeth Taylor.

== Association with Arnold Ehret and Ehret Literature Publishing ==
In “Still Ehret After All These Years,” historian Gordon Kennedy affirms that Fred Hirsch had severe health problems, including necrosis of the Achilles. In order to temporarily prolong his life from the above-mentioned terminal condition, three different bone specialists recommended that Hirsch have both of his feet amputated.

Following Hirsch's diagnosis, he attended a lecture by Professor Arnold Ehret in 1915 in hopes of finding remedy for his illness. After following Ehret's naturopathic healing methods, Hirsch no longer required crutches, was no longer ill, and became Ehret's business manager and publisher.

For 65 years, Fred Hirsch and his wife Lucille published alternative health books, most notably Ehret's Mucusless Diet Healing System and Rational Fasting. Hirsch's own published writings included prefaces, forewords, introductions, and full-length articles on diet and naturopathy.

Hirsch also manufactured and marketed “Prof. Arnold Ehret’s Inner Clean Intestinal Laxative".

On July 1, 1981, Alvin Last took ownership of Ehret Literature Publishing Company, Inc., which included the rights to manufacture the Inner Clean Intestinal Laxative.

== Highland Springs Resort ==
In 1927, Fred and his brother, William Walter Hirsch, bought Dr. Isaac Smith's property in Southern California and developed a vegetarian health resort, Highland Springs Resort – now Highland Springs Ranch & Inn. Fred Hirsch operated a vegetarian restaurant on the property which served produce grown on the land. Hirsch also cultivated and operated a grape vineyard. The resort became known as “The Last Resort” due to those who visited, in search of healing after medical methods didn't work. Among people travelling to Highland Springs for healing purposes, the resort became a location that Albert Einstein regularly visited whenever he went to Caltech in Pasadena. Celebrities, including Ernest Hemingway, Roy Rogers, Bob Hope, and Elizabeth Taylor, were also known to frequent the resort. The Rosin brothers purchased the Highland Springs property from the Hirsch brothers in 1948.

== Criticism ==
On October 14, 1931, Arthur M. Hyde, Secretary of Agriculture, claimed Hirsch's marketing of Professor Arnold Ehret's Innerclean Intestinal Laxative Formula to be “false and misleading”. Hirsch was issued a lawsuit where 125 cartons of Innerclean were seized. The product was released back to Hirsch under the condition that he pay a $4,000 bond and remove the advertisement on the packages, under the supervision of the United States Department of Agriculture.
