= Order of Diplomatic Service Merit =

Order of merit of South Korea

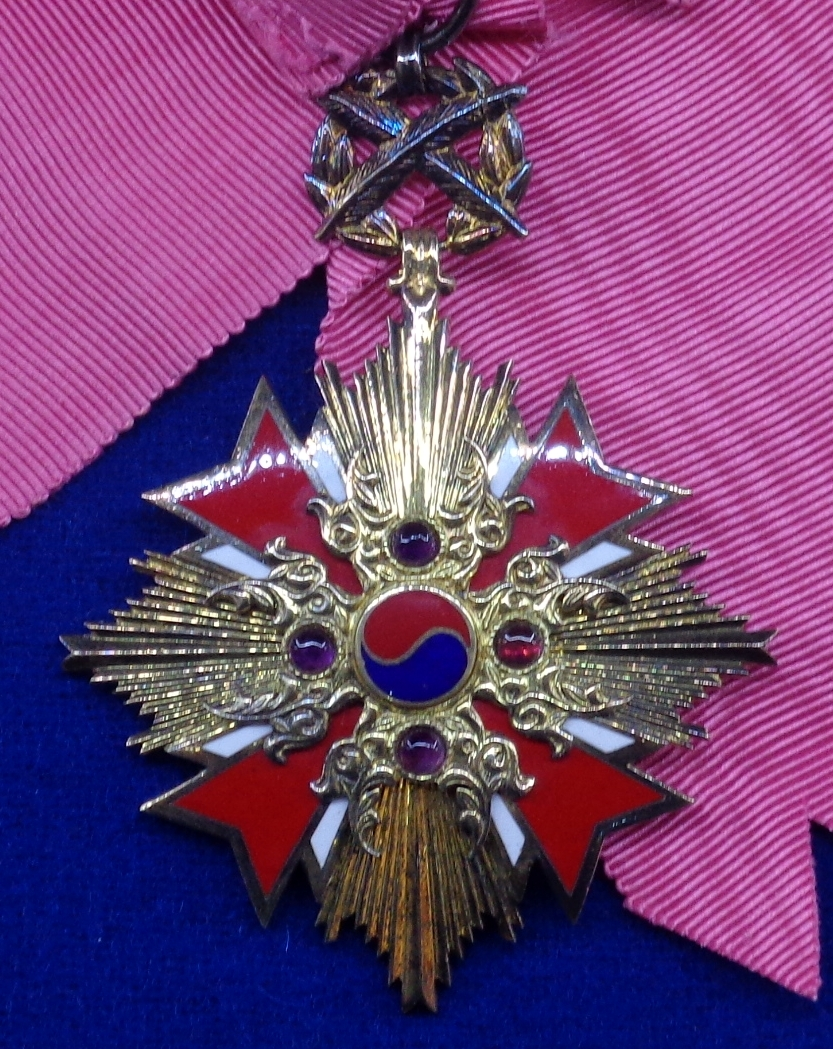
- Grand Gwanghwa Medal

Awarded by South Korea
- Type: Order of merit
- Established: 1963
- Eligibility: Diplomatic officials; Government representatives; Others
- Awarded for: Outstanding meritorious services in the interest of enhancing national prestige and promoting amity with allies.
- Status: Active
- Grades: Grand Gwanghwa Medal/Gwanghwa Medal; Heungin Medal; Sungnye Medal; Changui Medal; Sukjeong Medal

Precedence
- Next (higher): Grand Order of Mugunghwa
- Related: Order of National Foundation; Order of Civil Merit; Order of Military Merit; Order of Service Merit; Order of National Security Merit; Order of Industrial Service Merit; Order of Saemaeul Service Merit; Order of Cultural Merit; Order of Sports Merit; Order of Science and Technology Merit

- Korean name
- Hangul: 수교훈장
- Hanja: 修交勳章
- RR: Sugyo hunjang
- MR: Sugyo hunjang

The Order of Diplomatic Service Merit (Korean: 수교훈장) is one of South Korea's orders of merit. It is awarded by the President of South Korea for "outstanding meritorious services in the interest of enhancing national prestige and promoting amity with allies." It is a relatively rare honor, being usually awarded to a handful of people every year, and is one of the highest civilian awards of South Korea.

== Grades ==
The Order of Diplomatic Service Merit is divided into 5 grades. The first grade has two classes; the higher class is reserved for the most high-ranking diplomats.

Grade	Name	Ribbon
1st	Grand Gwanghwa Medal (광화대장)	
1st	Gwanghwa Medal (광화장)	
2nd	Heungin Medal (흥인장)	
3rd	Sungnye Medal (숭례장)	
4th	Changui Medal (창의장)	
5th	Sukjeong Medal (숙정장)	

== Recipients ==
- David Manker Abshire, former Ambassador to NATO, United States
- Georges Arsenijevic, technical advisor, Korean Cultural Center, France
- Irina Bokova, Director-General of UNESCO, Bulgaria
- Pengiran Muda Mohamed Bolkiah, Prince of Brunei
- Pengiran Muda Jefri Bolkiah, Member of the Bruneian Royal Family
- Sam Brownback, former US Senator from Kansas, current Governor of the State of Kansas, United States
- Fredrick Chien, Director-General of the Government Information Office, R.O.C., Taiwan
- Barry Devolin, MP, Canada
- Gyanendra, King of Nepal (then Prince of Nepal)
- Henrik, Prince Consort of Denmark
- Queen Silvia of Sweden
- Queen Sonja of Norway
- Queen Letizia of Spain
- Queen Máxima of the Netherlands
- Chaudhry Shujaat Hussain, Prime Minister, Pakistan
- Henry Hyde, Congressman, United States
- Lee Khoon Choy, MP and Ambassador, Singapore
- Darell Leiking, MP and former Minister of International Trade and Industry of Malaysia
- Joe Lieberman, Senator, United States
- Pin Malakul, Minister of Education and Culture, Thailand
- Kamisese Mara, Prime Minister, Fiji
- Zoila Martínez, Ambassador to South Korea, Dominican Republic
- Alois Mock, Vice Chancellor and Foreign Minister, Austria
- Khaldoon Al Mubarak, Chairman of the Executive Affairs Authority, United Arab Emirates
- Nguyễn Bá Lương, Speaker of the House of Representatives, South Vietnam
- Anand Panyarachun, Thailand
- Bernhard Paus, humanitarian, Norway
- Abu Saleh Mohammad Mustafizur Rahman, MP and Minister of Foreign Affairs, Bangladesh
- Lars Løkke Rasmussen, Prime Minister, Denmark
- Ryoichi Sasakawa, MP and industrialist, Japan
- Edward Seaga, Prime Minister, Jamaica
- Vajiralongkorn, King of Thailand (then Crown Prince of Thailand)
- Sirindhorn, Princess Royal of Thailand
- Pramarn Adireksarn, former Deputy Prime Minister of Thailand
- Prem Tinsulanonda, former Prime Minister of Thailand
- Venu Srinivasan, industrialist, India
- Sergei Stepashin, Prime Minister, Russia
- James Van Fleet, Army General, United States
- Tengku Intan Zaharah, Queen consort of Malaysia
- Mochtar Kusumaatmadja, Minister of Foreign Affairs of Indonesia
- Ginandjar Kartasasmita, Speaker of the Regional Representative Council of Indonesia
- Thomas Lembong, Minister of Trade of Indonesia
- Hatta Rajasa, Coordinating Ministers for the Economy of Indonesia
- Widodo Budidarmo, Chief of the Indonesian National Police
- L. B. Moerdani, Commander of the Indonesian National Armed Forces
- Sudharmono, Vice President of Indonesia
- Mahathir Mohamad, Prime Minister of Malaysia
- Abdullah Ahmad Badawi, Prime Minister of Malaysia
- Sultanah Zanariah Queen Consort of Malaysia
- Amb. Anne Höglund, former ambassador of the Kingdom of Sweden.
- Park Hang-seo, head coach of the Vietnam national team.
- Pham Binh Minh, Former Deputy Prime Minister of Vietnam
- Dato Lim Jock, ASEAN General Secretary
- Trần Văn Túy, Chairman of the Vietnam - Korea Parliamentary Friendship Group
- Frédéric Jenny, chairman, OECD Competition Committee
- Agata Kornhauser-Duda, First Lady of Poland
- Admiral Harry B. Harris Jr., Ambassador of the U.S. to South Korea, 2018-2021
- Fatih Birol, executive director of the International Energy Agency
- James Soong, Taiwan
- Prince Clem Ikanade Agba, Minister of State for Budget & National Planning, Nigeria

== See also ==
- Orders, decorations, and medals of South Korea
