= Order of Civil Merit (South Korea) =

South Korean distinction

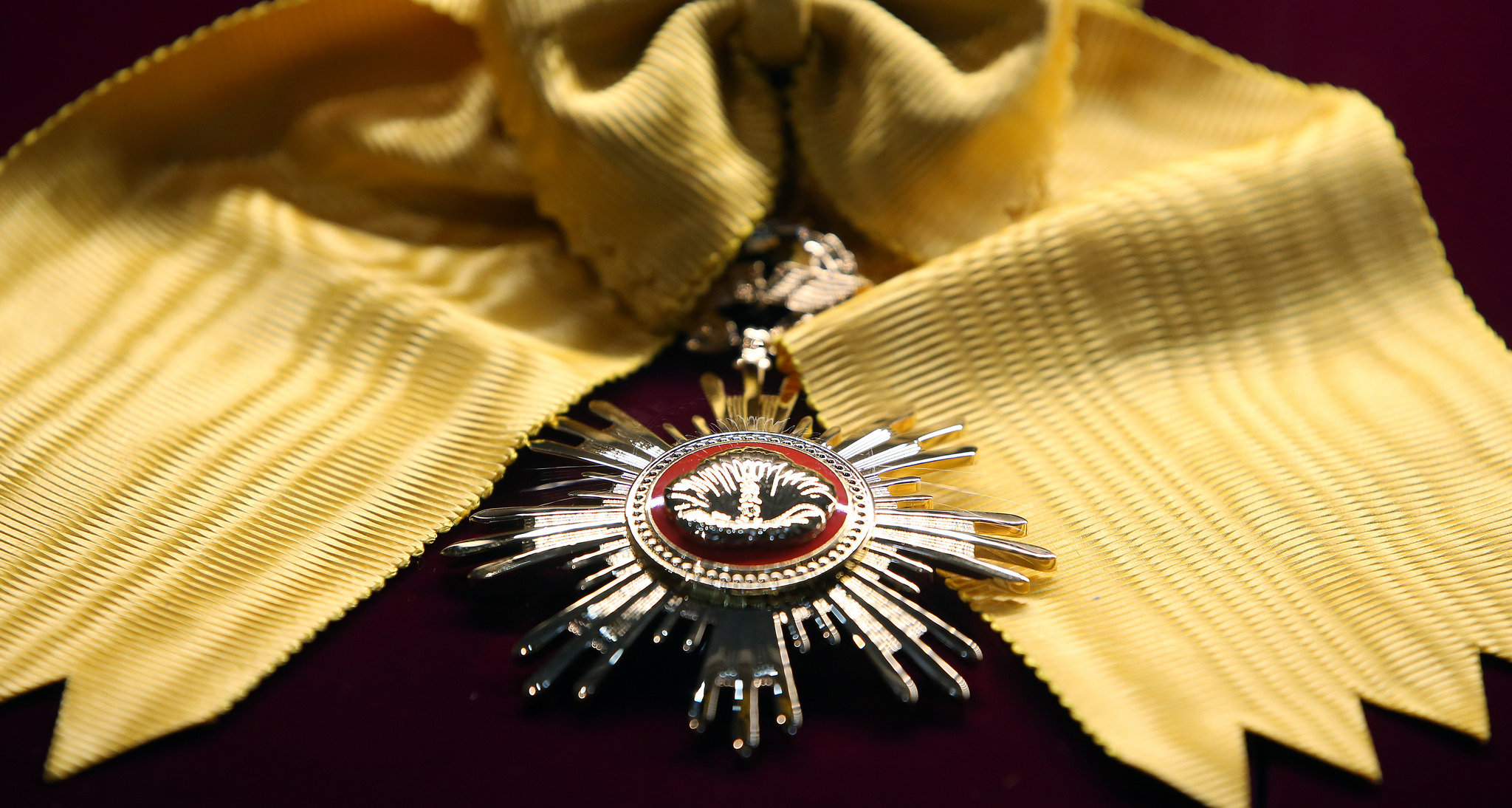
- Order of Civil Merit

Awarded by South Korea
- Type: Order of merit
- Status: Active
- Grades: Mugunghwa Medal; Moran Medal; Dongbaek Medal; Mongnyeon Medal; Seongnyu Medal

Precedence
- Next (higher): Grand Order of Mugunghwa
- Related: Order of National Foundation; Order of Military Merit; Order of Service Merit; Order of National Security Merit; Order of Diplomatic Service Merit; Order of Industrial Service Merit; Order of Saemaeul Service Merit; Order of Cultural Merit; Order of Sports Merit; Order of Science and Technology Merit

- Korean name
- Hangul: 국민훈장
- Hanja: 國民勳章
- RR: Gungmin hunjang
- MR: Kungmin hunjang

The Order of Civil Merit (Korean: 국민훈장) is one of South Korea's orders of merit. It is awarded by the President of South Korea for "outstanding meritorious services in the area of politics, economy, society, education, art or science in the interest of improving citizens' welfare and promoting national development."

== Grades ==
The Order of Civil Merit is divided into five grades.

Grade	Name	Ribbon
1st	Mugunghwa [Hibiscus] Medal (무궁화장)	
2nd	Moran [Peony] Medal (모란장)	
3rd	Dongbaek [Camellia] Medal (동백장)	
4th	Mongnyeon [Magnolia] Medal (목련장)	
5th	Seongnyu [Pomegranate] Medal (석류장)	

== Notable recipients ==
- Jeon Tae-il (2020)
- Hwang Hye-seong (1986)
- Tom Kim
- Benjamin W. Lee
- Ilchi Lee
- Kevin O'Donnell
- Younghi Pagh-Paan (2007)
- Park Mok-wol (1972)
- Sohn Kee-chung
- Jarl Wahlström (1983)
- Chai-Shin Yu (2006)
- Yuna Kim (2012)
- Suh Myung-sook (2026)
