= Order of Merit for National Foundation =

Award of South Korea

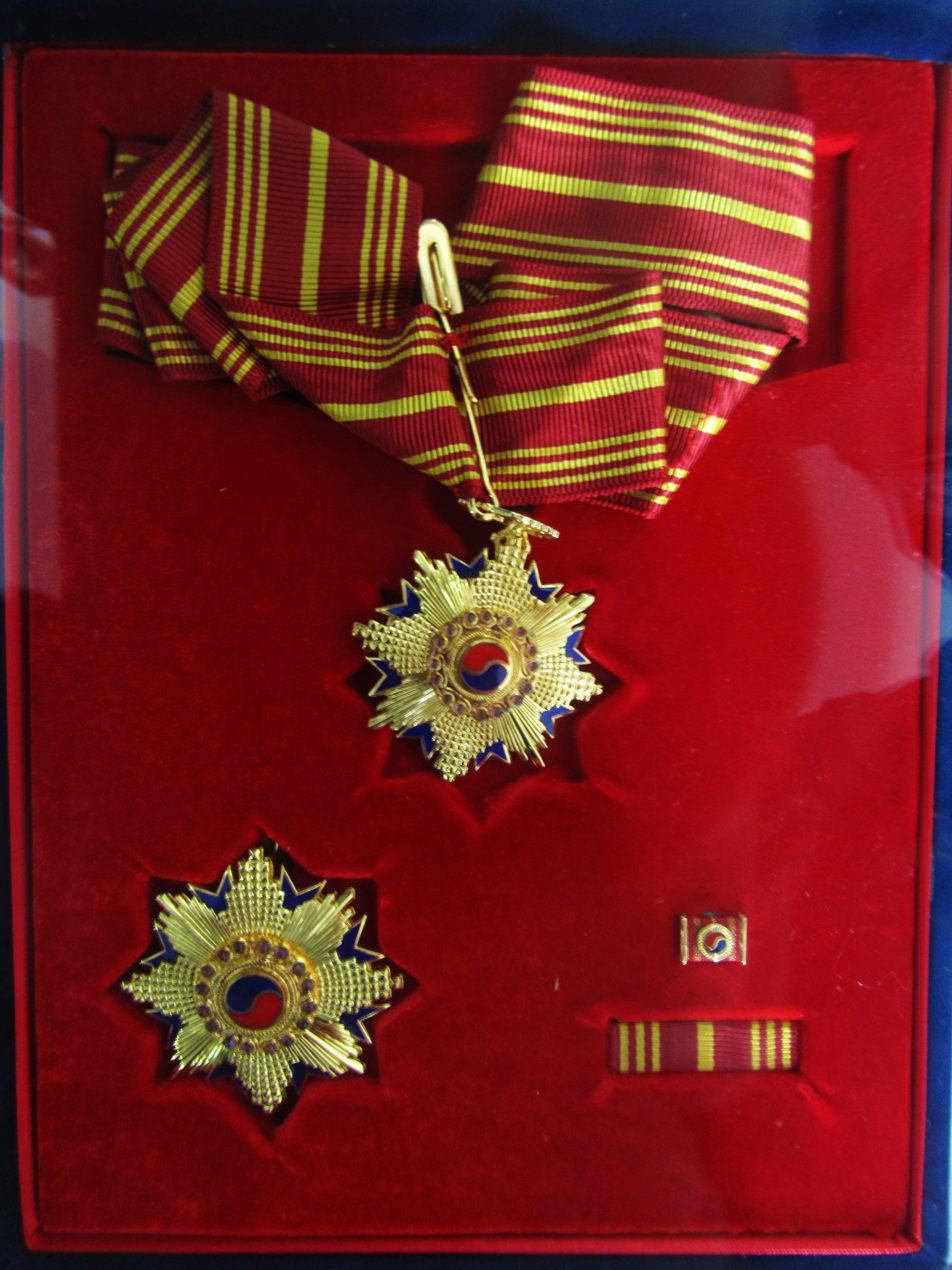
- 3rd Grade Order of Merit for National Foundation.

Awarded by South Korea
- Type: Order of merit
- Awarded for: Outstanding meritorious services in the interest of founding or laying a foundation for the Republic of Korea.
- Status: Active
- Grades: Republic of Korea Medal; Presidential Medal; Independence Medal; Patriotic Medal; National Medal

Precedence
- Next (higher): Grand Order of Mugunghwa
- Related: Order of Civil Merit; Order of Military Merit; Order of Service Merit; Order of National Security Merit; Order of Diplomatic Service Merit; Order of Industrial Service Merit; Order of Saemaeul Service Merit; Order of Cultural Merit; Order of Sports Merit; Order of Science and Technology Merit

- Korean name
- Hangul: 건국훈장
- Hanja: 建國勳章
- RR: Geonguk hunjang
- MR: Kŏn'guk hunjang

The Order of Merit for National Foundation (Korean: 건국훈장) is one of South Korea's orders of merit. It is awarded by the President of South Korea for "outstanding meritorious services in the interest of founding or laying a foundation for the Republic of Korea."

== Grades ==
The Order of Merit for National Foundation is awarded in five grades.

Grade	Name	Ribbon
1st	Republic of Korea Medal (대한민국장)	
2nd	Presidential Medal (대통령장)	
3rd	Independence Medal (독립장)	
4th	Patriotic Medal (애국장)	
5th	National Medal (애족장)	

== History ==
The Order was originally established under a slightly different name 건국공로훈장 (建國功勞勳章) by Presidential Decree #82, on Apr. 27, 1949, and is the oldest Order of the Republic of Korea. On January 16, 1967, there were major changes made to the Order of National Foundation under Presidential Decree #2929. The name of the Order was shortened from 건국공로훈장 (建國功勞勳章) to 건국훈장 (建國勳章), and all three classes got new names and designs.

== Recipients ==
As of 2019, 15,111 people received the medal. As of 2010, 60 people were awarded the Republic of Korea Medal.

=== Republic of Korea Medal ===
- Bhumibol Adulyadej (1981)
- Ahn Chang Ho (1962)
- An Jung-geun (1962)
- Sourou-Migan Apithy (1965)
- Chang Myon (1999)
- Chen Qimei (1968)
- Choe Ik-hyeon (1962)
- David Dacko (1965)
- Ludwig Erhard (1964)
- Han Yong-un (1962)
- Heo Wi (1962)
- Félix Houphouët-Boigny (1965)
- Jo Byeong-se (1962)
- Kang Ugyu (1962)
- Kim Chang-suk (1962)
- Kim Chwajin (1962)
- Kim Ku (1962)
- Lyuh Woon-hyung (2008)
- Douglas MacArthur (1964)
- Adnan Menderes (1958)
- Min Yŏnghwan (1962)
- Ngo Dinh Diem (1957)
- Oh Dong-jin (1962)
- Rhee Syngman (1949)
- Haile Selassie (1955)
- Léopold Sédar Senghor (1965)
- Sin Ik-hui (1962)
- Sirikit (1981)
- Son Byong-hi (1962)
- Soong Mei-ling (1966)
- Sun Yat-sen (1968)
- François Tombalbaye (1965)
- Harry S. Truman (1964)
- James Van Fleet (1953)
- Yi Gang-nyeon (1962)
- Yi Chun (1962)
- Yi Si-yeong (1949)
- Yi Seung-hun (1962)
- Yun Bong-gil (1962)

=== Presidential Medal ===
- Hong Beom-do
- Lee Bong-chang
- Sin Ch'aeho (1962)
- Yu Gwan-sun

=== Independence Medal ===
- Cho Dong-ho (2005)
- Kwon O-seol (2005)
- Frank Schofield (1968)

=== Patriotic Medal ===
- Kaneko Fumiko (2018)
- Kim Jae-bong (2005)

=== National Medal ===
- Bae Seong-ryong (2005)
- Tatsuji Fuse (2004)
- Kang Gwan-sun (2005)
- Kang Hae-seok (2005)
- Seo Jae-ik (2005)

=== Revoked ===
Chun Doo-hwan received the Republic of Korea Medal during his presidency. However, in 2006, the Roh Moo-hyun government revoked medals awarded to those involved in the 1979 South Korean coup d'état and the suppression of the Gwangju Uprising.

== Criticism ==
Kim Dong-jin, chairman of the Hulbert Memorial Society, argued that the awarding of medals to foreigners has lacked objectivity, especially before 1960. Shim Ok-joo, director of the Korea Women’s Independence Movement Research Institute, criticized the fact that Soong Mei-ling was the only woman to have received the Republic of Korea Medal.

There has been criticism that Chinilpa (Korean collaborators with the Empire of Japan) were awarded the medal. Chang Myon and Park Chung Hee are listed in the Encyclopedia of Pro-Japanese Collaborators. According to Munhwa Broadcasting Corporation’s 2026 investigation, at least 31 people listed as independence activists are suspected of being Chinilpa, and most of them had received the Order of Merit for National Foundation.

== See also ==
- Orders, decorations, and medals of South Korea
