= Grand Order of Mugunghwa =

South Korean award

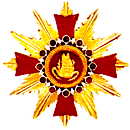
- Star of the order

Awarded by South Korea
- Type: Order of merit
- Established: August 13, 1949
- Eligibility: Current or former President of South Korea; President's spouse; Head of an ally or his/her spouse; Former head of an ally or his/her spouse
- Awarded for: Outstanding meritorious services in the interest of promoting the development and security of the Republic of Korea.
- Status: Active

Precedence
- Next (higher): None
- Next (lower): Order of National Foundation; Order of Civil Merit; Order of Military Merit; Order of Service Merit; Order of National Security Merit; Order of Diplomatic Service Merit; Order of Industrial Service Merit; Order of Saemaeul Service Merit; Order of Cultural Merit; Order of Sports Merit; Order of Science and Technology Merit
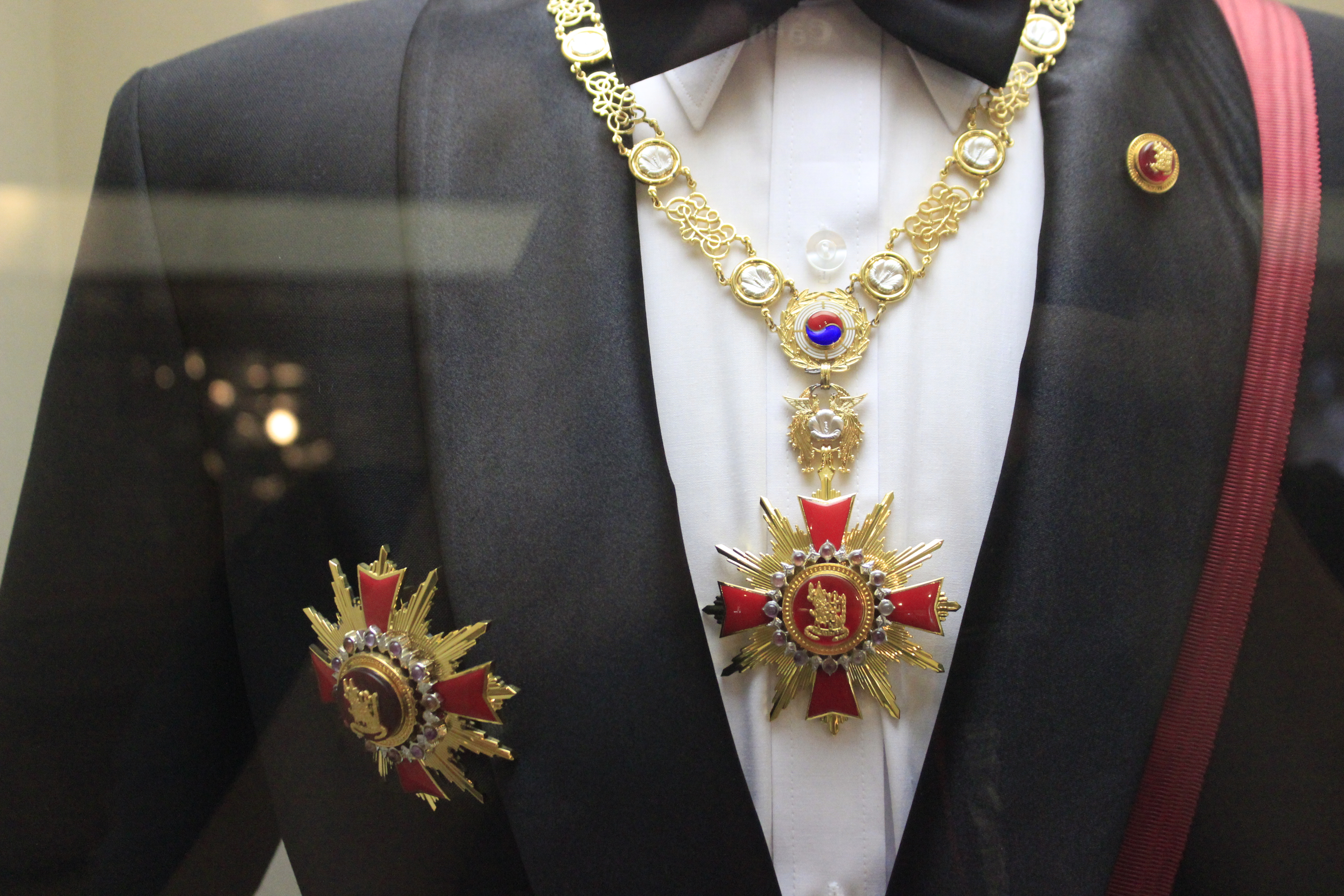
- Insignia of the order Sash riband of the order

- Korean name
- Hangul: 무궁화대훈장
- Hanja: 無窮花大勳章
- RR: Mugunghwa daehunjang
- MR: Mugunghwa taehunjang

The Grand Order of Mugunghwa (Korean: 무궁화대훈장) is the highest national order awarded by South Korea. It is awarded to the President of South Korea, and it may be awarded to their spouse, heads or former heads of state of South Korean allies, and their spouses. The order is presented for, "Outstanding meritorious services in the interest of promoting the development and security of the Republic of Korea."

The Grand Order of Mugunghwa takes its name from South Korea's national flower, the hibiscus. The hibiscus is a cultivar native to the Korean peninsula and has great cultural significance in Korean history.

== Appearance ==
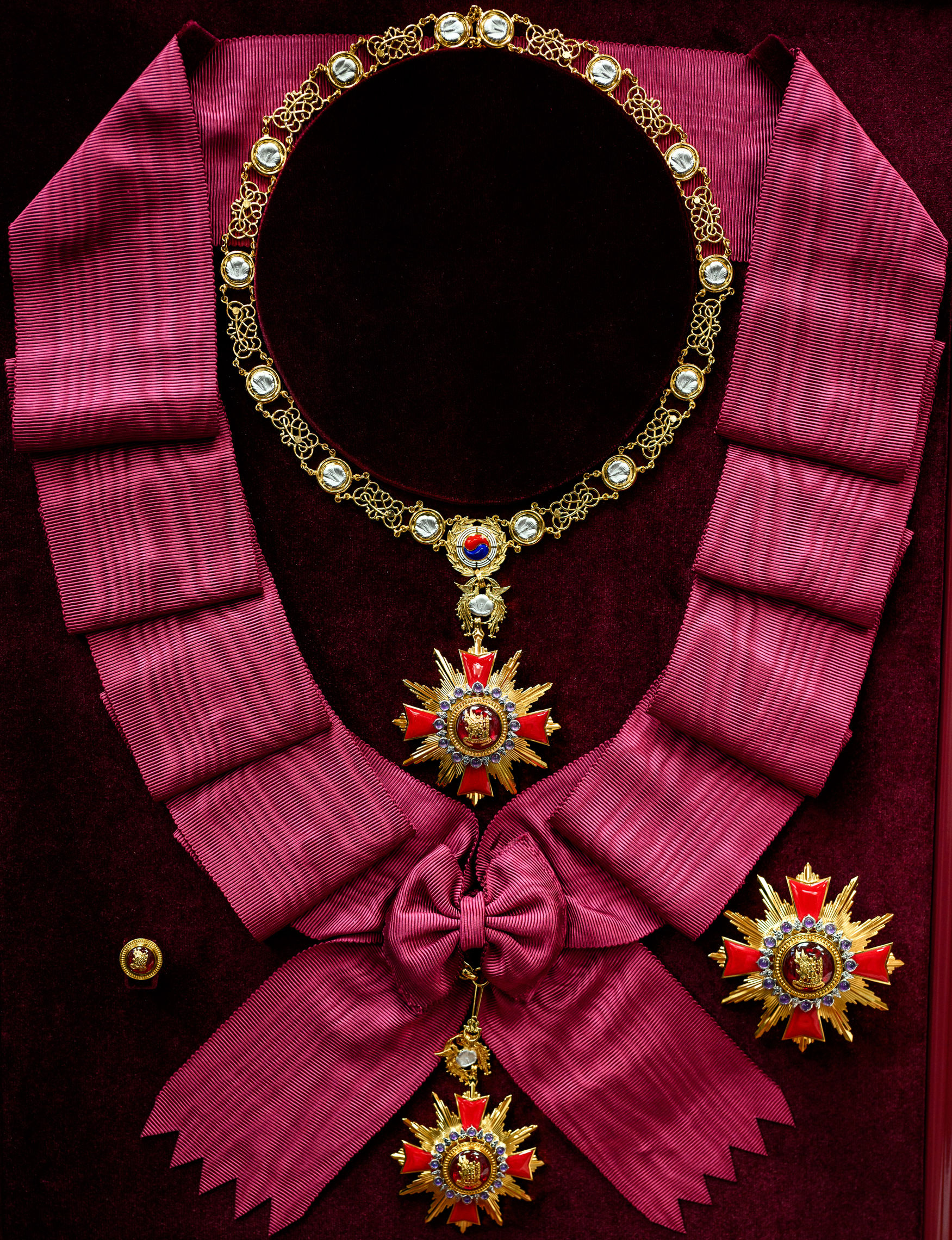

The Grand Order of Mugunghwa consists of "an insignia worn around the neck, a badge affixed to sash worn over the shoulder and a star, with a ribbon and a lapel badge as necessary", according to law. The Grand Order of Mugunghwa may be made of gold, silver, ruby and amethyst. As of 2013, the cost to produce it was approximately 20 million won, or 19,000 US$.

== Controversies ==
The Grand Order of Mugunghwa is traditionally awarded to the incoming President of South Korea shortly after their inauguration. However, Former President Roh Moo-hyun opted to accept the award upon his departure from office in 2008. Subsequent presidents established this precedent and opted to receive the award after finishing their term in full (Lee Myung-bak and Moon Jae-in).

After their conviction for treason in 1996, former presidents Chun Doo-hwan and Roh Tae-woo were ordered to return the Grand Order of Mugunghwa along with other state decorations. While Chun agreed to return the awards, he and Roh never did.

By statute, the Grand Order of Mugunghwa is the highest decoration in Korea; however, in the eyes of the public, it is not well regarded. Many Koreans feel that the order has far less significance. This is because it is self-awarded and is based on winning an election, not on any positive achievements for the country. It is also given to foreign heads of state, not necessarily because of what they have done for Korea, but for what they may do for Korea in the future.

== Recipients ==
| Year | Name | Title | Nationality |
|---|---|---|---|
| 1949 | Syngman Rhee | President | South Korea |
| 1960 | Yun Posun | President | South Korea |
| 1963 | Park Chung Hee | President | South Korea |
| 1964 | Heinrich Lübke | President | West Germany |
| 1964 | Wilhelmine Lübke | First lady | West Germany |
| 1966 | Ismail Nasiruddin of Terengganu | King | Malaysia |
| 1966 | Tengku Ampuan Tua Intan Zaharah | Queen | Malaysia |
| 1966 | Bhumibol Adulyadej | King | Thailand |
| 1966 | Sirikit | Queen | Thailand |
| 1966 | Chiang Kai-shek | President | China |
| 1967 | Yuk Young-soo | First lady | South Korea |
| 1968 | Haile Selassie | Emperor | Ethiopia |
| 1969 | Nguyễn Văn Thiệu | President | South Vietnam |
| 1969 | Nguyễn Thị Mai Anh | First lady | South Vietnam |
| 1969 | Hamani Diori | President | Niger |
| 1969 | Aissa Diori | First lady | Niger |
| 1970 | Fidel Sánchez Hernández | President | El Salvador |
| 1970 | Marina Uriarte | First lady | El Salvador |
| 1975 | Omar Bongo | President | Gabon |
| 1975 | Josephine Bongo | First lady | Gabon |
| 1979 | Léopold Sédar Senghor | President | Senegal |
| 1979 | Colette Hubert Senghor | First lady | Senegal |
| 1979 | Choi Kyu-hah | President | South Korea |
| 1979 | Hong Gi | First lady | South Korea |
| 1980 | Khalid of Saudi Arabia | King | Saudi Arabia |
| 1980 | Jaber Al-Ahmad Al-Sabah | Emir | Kuwait |
| 1980 | Chun Doo-hwan | President | South Korea |
| 1980 | Lee Soon-ja | First lady | South Korea |
| 1981 | Suharto | President | Indonesia |
| 1981 | Siti Hartinah | First lady | Indonesia |
| 1981 | Ahmad Shah of Pahang | King | Malaysia |
| 1981 | Tengku Ampuan Afzan | Queen | Malaysia |
| 1981 | Ferdinand Marcos | President | Philippines |
| 1981 | Imelda Marcos | First lady | Philippines |
| 1981 | Rodrigo Carazo Odio | President | Costa Rica |
| 1981 | Estrella Zeledón Lizano | First lady | Costa Rica |
| 1982 | Samuel Doe | President | Liberia |
| 1982 | Mobutu Sese Seko | President | Zaire |
| 1982 | Bobi Ladawa Mobutu | First lady | Zaire |
| 1982 | Abdou Diouf | President | Senegal |
| 1982 | Kenan Evren | President | Turkey |
| 1983 | Gaafar Nimeiry | President | Sudan |
| 1983 | Butina Khalil Abbulhashan | First lady | Sudan |
| 1983 | Hussein of Jordan | King | Jordan |
| 1983 | Queen Noor of Jordan | Queen | Jordan |
| 1984 | Hassanal Bolkiah | Sultan | Brunei |
| 1984 | Khalifa bin Hamad Al Thani | Emir | Qatar |
| 1984 | Dawda Jawara | President | Gambia |
| 1984 | Chilele Jawara | First lady | Gambia |
| 1984 | Maumoon Abdul Gayoom | President | Maldives |
| 1985 | Muhammad Zia-ul-Haq | President | Pakistan |
| 1985 | Luis Alberto Monge | President | Costa Rica |
| 1986 | Elizabeth II | Queen | United Kingdom |
| 1986 | Baudouin of Belgium | King | Belgium |
| 1987 | Ahmed Abdallah | President | Comoros |
| 1988 | Roh Tae-woo | President | South Korea |
| 1988 | Kim Ok-suk | First lady | South Korea |
| 1988 | Iskandar of Johor | King | Malaysia |
| 1988 | Tunku Puan Zanariah | Queen | Malaysia |
| 1989 | Richard von Weizsäcker | President | West Germany |
| 1989 | François Mitterrand | President | France |
| 1989 | Danielle Mitterrand | First lady | France |
| 1990 | Andrés Rodríguez | President | Paraguay |
| 1990 | Árpád Göncz | President | Hungary |
| 1991 | Azlan Shah of Perak | King | Malaysia |
| 1991 | Raja Permaisuri Bainun | Queen | Malaysia |
| 1991 | Carlos Salinas de Gortari | President | Mexico |
| 1992 | Jorge Serrano Elías | President | Guatemala |
| 1992 | Albert II of Belgium | King | Belgium |
| 1993 | Kim Young-sam | President | South Korea |
| 1993 | Son Myung-soon | First lady | South Korea |
| 1993 | Fidel Ramos | President | Philippines |
| 1993 | Amelita Ramos | First lady | Philippines |
| 1994 | Eduardo Frei Ruiz-Tagle | President | Chile |
| 1994 | Lech Wałęsa | President | Poland |
| 1995 | Islam Karimov | President | Uzbekistan |
| 1995 | Roman Herzog | President | Germany |
| 1995 | Zhelyu Zhelev | President | Bulgaria |
| 1995 | Nelson Mandela | President | South Africa |
| 1995 | Carlos Menem | President | Argentina |
| 1996 | Álvaro Arzú | President | Guatemala |
| 1996 | Fernando Henrique Cardoso | President | Brazil |
| 1996 | Juan Carlos I of Spain | King | Spain |
| 1996 | Queen Sofía of Spain | Queen | Spain |
| 1996 | Tuanku Ja’afar | King | Malaysia |
| 1996 | Leonid Kuchma | President | Ukraine |
| 1998 | Kim Dae-jung | President | South Korea |
| 1998 | Lee Hee-ho | First lady | South Korea |
| 2000 | Carlo Azeglio Ciampi | President | Italy |
| 2000 | Jacques Chirac | President | France |
| 2006 | Abdelaziz Bouteflika | President | Algeria |
| 2007 | Sabah Al-Ahmad Al-Jaber Al-Sabah | Emir | Kuwait |
| 2007 | Hamad bin Khalifa Al Thani | Emir | Qatar |
| 2008 | Roh Moo-hyun | President | South Korea |
| 2008 | Kwon Yang-sook | First lady | South Korea |
| 2009 | Nursultan Nazarbayev | President | Kazakhstan |
| 2009 | Alan García | President | Peru |
| 2009 | Giorgio Napolitano | President | Italy |
| 2011 | Margrethe II of Denmark | Queen | Denmark |
| 2012 | Carl XVI Gustaf of Sweden | King | Sweden |
| 2012 | Khalifa bin Zayed Al Nahyan | President | United Arab Emirates |
| 2013 | Lee Myung-bak | President | South Korea |
| 2013 | Kim Yoon-ok | First lady | South Korea |
| 2013 | Park Geun Hye | President | South Korea |
| 2014 | Susilo Bambang Yudhoyono | President | Indonesia |
| 2015 | Ollanta Humala | President | Peru |
| 2018 | Emmanuel Macron | President | France |
| 2019 | Harald V | King | Norway |
| 2021 | Alexander Van der Bellen | President | Austria |
| 2021 | Felipe VI of Spain | King | Spain |
| 2021 | Iván Duque Márquez | President | Colombia |
| 2021 | Borut Pahor | President | Slovenia |
| 2022 | Moon Jae-in | President | South Korea |
| 2022 | Kim Jung-sook | First lady | South Korea |
| 2023 | Andrzej Duda | President | Poland |
| 2023 | Sergio Mattarella | President | Italy |
| 2023 | Charles III | King | United Kingdom |
| 2023 | Willem-Alexander | King | Netherlands |
| 2024 | Dina Boluarte | President | Peru |
| 2025 | Donald Trump | President | United States |
| 2026 | Prabowo Subianto | President | Indonesia |

== See also ==
- Orders, decorations, and medals of South Korea
