= Order of National Security Merit =

South Korean order

Awarded by South Korea
- Type: Order of merit
- Awarded for: Outstanding meritorious services in the interest of national security.
- Status: Active

Precedence
- Next (higher): Grand Order of Mugunghwa
- Related: Order of National Foundation; Order of Civil Merit; Order of Military Merit; Order of Service Merit; Order of Diplomatic Service Merit; Order of Industrial Service Merit; Order of Saemaeul Service Merit; Order of Cultural Merit; Order of Sports Merit; Order of Science and Technology Merit

- Korean name
- Hangul: 보국훈장
- Hanja: 保國勳章
- RR: Boguk hunjang
- MR: Poguk hunjang

The Order of National Security Merit (Korean: 보국훈장) is one of South Korea's orders of merit. It is awarded by the President of South Korea for "outstanding meritorious services in the interest of national security."

== Grades ==
The order is divided into five grades.

| Grade | Name | Ribbon |
|---|---|---|
| 1st | Tongil Medal (통일장) | |
| 2nd | Gukseon Medal (국선장) | |
| 3rd | Cheonsu Medal (천수장) | |
| 4th | Samil Medal (삼일장) | |
| 5th | Gwangbok Medal (광복장) | |

The Exemplary Public Official Medal is also awarded for exemplary public official with 6th Grade (Assistant Director level) or under.

== Recipients ==
=== Tongil Medal ===
- Kris Sivara, former Supreme Commander of the Armed Forces (1969)
- Arthit Kamlang-ek, former Supreme Commander of the Armed Forces (1984)
- Sunthorn Kongsompong, former Supreme Commander of the Armed Forces (1990)
- Surayud Chulanont, former Supreme Commander of the Armed Forces (2002)
- Maraden Panggabean, former Commander of the Indonesian National Armed Forces
- Try Sutrisno, former Commander of the Indonesian National Armed Forces
- Edi Sudradjat, former Commander of the Indonesian National Armed Forces
- Endriartono Sutarto, former Commander of the Indonesian National Armed Forces
- Agus Suhartono, former Commander of the Indonesian National Armed Forces
- Md Hashim Hussein, former Chief of the Malaysia Army
- Umar Wirahadikusumah, former Chief of Staff of the Indonesian Army
- Surono Reksodimedjo, former Chief of Staff of the Indonesian Army
- Makmun Murod, former Chief of Staff of the Indonesian Army
- Raden Widodo, former Chief of Staff of the Indonesian Army
- Poniman, former Chief of Staff of the Indonesian Army
- Rudini, former Chief of Staff of the Indonesian Army
- Wismoyo Arismunandar, former Chief of Staff of the Indonesian Army
- Feisal Tanjung, former Commander of the Indonesian National Armed Forces (1995)
- Igor Sergeyev, former Minister of Defence of the Russian Federation (1999)
- Gary Roughead, former Chief of Naval Operations (2009)
- Harry B. Harris Jr., former Commander U.S. Pacific Fleet (2014)
- Gatot Nurmantyo, former Commander of the Indonesian National Armed Forces (2015)
- Martin Dempsey, former Chairman of the Joint Chiefs of Staff (2015)
- Ade Supandi, former Chief of Staff of the Indonesian Navy (2016)
- Mohammed bin Ahmad Al Bordawi, Minister of State for Defence Affairs of United Arab Emirates (2018)
- Mark Milley, former Chief of Staff of the United States Army (2018)
- Vincent K. Brooks, former Commander United States Forces Korea (2018)
- Robert Neller, former Commandant of the Marine Corps (2019)
- Robert B. Abrams, former Commander United States Forces Korea (2021)
- Charles Q. Brown Jr., Chief of Staff of the United States Air Force (2022)

=== Gukseon Medal ===
- Wayne Eyre, former Chief of the Defence Staff, Canadian Armed Forces (2019)
- Phichit Kullavanich, former Commander of the 1st Army Region (1986)
- L. B. Moerdani, former Commander of the Indonesian National Armed Forces
- Francis J. Wiercinski, former United States Army Pacific Commander (2013)
- John D. Johnson, former Commander of the Eighth United States Army (2013)
- Thomas W. Bergeson, former Commander Seventh Air Force (2018)
- Kenneth S. Wilsbach, Commander Pacific Air Forces (2020)

=== Cheonsu Medal ===
- Peter Gumataotao, United States Navy rear admiral (2011)
- William D. Byrne Jr., former Commander of the United States Naval Forces Korea (2016)
- Dennis J. Murphy, United States Marine Corps major general
- Stephen G. Olmstead, retired United States Marine Corps lieutenant general
- William E. Souza III, former Commander of United States Marine Corps Forces Korea (2023-2025), retired United States Marine Corps major general

=== Samil Medal ===
- Bradley Hayworth, former Director of Intelligence, Surveillance and Reconnaissance at Air Force Global Strike Command (2011)
- COL Harold Cockburn, former Defense attaché, Embassy of New Zealand, Seoul (2011)
- Phil W. Yu, United States Naval Officer (2015)
- COL Johnny Davis, United States Army Officer (2017)
- COL Kevin D. Admiral, United States Army Officer (2018)
- COL Derrick S. Lee, United States Army Officer (2018)
- COL Ryan Janovic, United States Army Officer (2019)
- Imam Subekti, former Indonesian Military attaché in Seoul (2021)

== See also ==
- Orders, decorations, and medals of South Korea
