= Order of Service Merit =

South Korean order of merit

Awarded by South Korea
- Type: Order of merit
- Eligibility: Public officials; Private school teachers; Special post office employees
- Awarded for: Outstanding meritorious services by applying himself/herself to his/her duties.
- Status: Active
- Grades: Blue Stripes; Yellow Stripes; Red Stripes; Green Stripes; Aquamarine Stripes

Precedence
- Next (higher): Grand Order of Mugunghwa
- Related: Order of National Foundation; Order of Civil Merit; Order of Military Merit; Order of National Security Merit; Order of Diplomatic Service Merit; Order of Industrial Service Merit; Order of Saemaeul Service Merit; Order of Cultural Merit; Order of Sports Merit; Order of Science and Technology Merit; Service Merit Medal; Exemplary Public Official Medal

- Korean name
- Hangul: 근정훈장
- Hanja: 勤政勳章
- RR: Geunjeong hunjang
- MR: Kŭnjŏng hunjang

The Order of Service Merit (Korean: 근정훈장) is one of South Korea's orders of merit. It is awarded by the President of South Korea to public officials, private school teachers, and special post office employees for "outstanding meritorious services by applying himself/herself to his/her duties."

== Grades ==
The Order of Service Merit is divided into five grades.

Grade	Name	Ribbon
1st	Blue Stripes (청조)	
2nd	Yellow Stripes (황조)	
3rd	Red Stripes (홍조)	
4th	Green Stripes (녹조)	
5th	Jade Stripes (옥조)	

== Notable recipients ==
- Ban Ki-moon
- Cristian Barros
- Wallace M. Greene
- Thanat Khoman
- Kim Duck-soo
- Victor H. Krulak
- Yeon Cheon Oh

== See also ==
- Orders, decorations, and medals of South Korea
