= Egami Namio =

Japanese academic

- Born: 1906; Japan
- Died: 2002 (aged 95–96); Japan
- Scientific career
- Fields: Archaeology

Egami Namio (1906–2002) was a Japanese archaeologist, academic, university professor, historian and writer.

== Biography ==
He was born in 1906.

He served as a professor of the University of Tokyo and Director of Ancient Orient Museum, Tokyo from 1978 to 1985.

He is most notable for being the proponent of the Horserider Theory.

He died in 2002.

== Awards and honours ==
He was awarded the Order of Cultural Merit (South Korea) in 1991.

== See also ==
- Order of Cultural Merit (South Korea)
