= Kim Dae-sung =

Kim Dae-sung may refer to:

- Kim Dae-sung (footballer)
- Kim Dae-sung (badminton)
- Kim Daeseong (700–774), chief minister of Silla
- Kim Dae-seung (born 1967), South Korean film director and screenwriter
- Kim Dai-Sung (1930-2007), Korean Industrialist
