= Kim Yong-ki =

South Korean agrarian (1908–1988)

- Born: September 5, 1908; Bong-an Village, Yangju, Gyeonggi Province, Korean Empire
- Died: August 1, 1988 (aged 79); Seoul, South Korea
- Resting place: 2nd Canaan Farmer's School in Gangwon-do, South Korea
- Known for: South Korean agrarian movement leader
- Spouse: Kim Bonghee
- Children: 5
- Awards: Ramon Magsaysay Award, Inchon Cultural Award, Order of Saemaeul Service Merit,

Korean name
- Hangul: 김용기
- Hanja: 金容基
- RR: Gim Yonggi
- MR: Kim Yonggi
- Website: Ilga Memorial Foundation

Kim Yong-ki (Korean: 김용기; September 5, 1908 – August 1, 1988) was a South Korean agrarian movement leader, Christian and philosopher. He was a pioneer in waste land cultivation, and strove to demonstrate through his work that life as a farmer can be fulfilling and productive. His mission was to induce dynamic spiritual, inspirational, and economic change in rural areas of South Korea. He is considered one of the founding fathers of the New Community Movement, the foundation of South Korea's modernization. He founded the Canaan School in Gwangju, Gyeonggi, in 1962. In recognition of his work, he was awarded the Ramon Magsaysay Award for Public service in 1966.
