= Freedom of religion in Korea =

Freedom of religion in Korea may refer to:

- Freedom of religion in South Korea
- Freedom of religion in North Korea
