= Frank Schofield =

Canadian veterinarian and activist (1889–1970)

- Born: Frank William Schofield; 15 March 1889; Warwickshire, England
- Died: 16 April 1970 (aged 81); Seoul, South Korea
- Burial place: Seoul National Cemetery
- Known for: Korean independence activism
- Spouse: Alice Schofield
- Awards: Order of Cultural Merit; Key to the City of Seoul; Order of Merit for National Foundation; Distinguished Member (American College of Veterinary Pathologists)
- Medical career
- Profession: Veterinarian and Missionary
- Institutions: Ontario Veterinary College, Seoul National University
- Research: Paragonimus, new-castle disease

Korean name
- Hangul: 석호필
- Hanja: 石虎弼
- RR: Seok Hopil
- MR: Sŏk Hop'il

Frank William Schofield (15 March 1889 – 16 April 1970) was a British-born Canadian veterinarian, missionary, and Korean independence activist. He was also known by his Korean name Seok Ho-pil (Korean: 석호필; Hanja: 石虎弼).

In 1916, Schofield moved to Korea as a Presbyterian missionary and lecturer at Severance Medical School. Korea was then under Japanese rule, and Schofield became known for openly criticizing Japan's repressive policies. In 1919, he became one of a handful of foreigners informed in advance of the March First Movement protests, now considered a seminal event in Korean history. Schofield photographed and documented the protests, and spread news of their violent suppression to the international press. His work is now considered historically significant, with his photos now displayed in textbooks and museums in South Korea. In 1920, he was pressured to leave Korea and returned to Canada. There, he continued donating to Korea and advocating for its independence.

Schofield returned to his alma mater, Ontario Veterinary College, where he would lecture and research until his retirement in 1955. He was then invited to return to South Korea by its president Syngman Rhee, and was made a professor at the veterinary college of Seoul National University. He continued being politically active; he publicly criticized the military dictatorships of Rhee and Park Chung Hee and advocated for a number of reforms in Korea. He was charitable, and donated much of his money to orphanages and scholarships. Among his beneficiaries and mentees was the later Prime Minister of South Korea Chung Un-chan.

Schofield has since become beloved in South Korea. He has been described as "an eternal Korean", and received a number of awards from the country. He was the first non-Korean to be buried in Seoul National Cemetery. He is also remembered for his contributions to veterinary and biological research.

== Early life and education ==
Frank William Schofield was born on 15 March 1889 in Warwickshire, England, United Kingdom. He was the youngest of four siblings. His mother died when he was young, and his father remarried. Schofield's family has been described as lower middle-class. Schofield hoped to move to Canada, which he saw as a land of opportunity, and saved money by working as a farm laborer in order to move there after graduating from high school.

In 1907, Schofield moved by himself to Toronto, Ontario, Canada. He again worked as a farm laborer while there. In fall of that year, he was admitted to the Ontario Veterinary College (OVC). During his schooling, Schofield experienced not only financial difficulties, but also contracted polio, which left one of each of his legs and arms paralyzed. He completed his Bachelor of Veterinary Science degree in 1910 and his Doctor of Veterinary Science degree in 1911. His thesis was entitled "The bacteriological analysis of milk being sold in Toronto". In 1912, he joined the faculty of his alma mater. In 1913, he married Alice, a piano student.

== Korea ==
In November 1916, Schofield and his wife arrived in Korea as missionaries of the Presbyterian Church in Canada. Schofield had been invited to go by the head of Severance Medical School (세브란스의학전문학교), Oliver R. Avison, and became an instructor at that school. At the time, Korea was under Japanese occupation, and Korean activities and culture were subject to repression.

Schofield worked to learn the Korean language upon his arrival, and by his second year was able to give lectures in the language. He adopted a Korean name: "Seok Ho-pil". The name's pronunciation resembles that of his surname. The Hanja characters in his name each have meaning; seok means stone, ho means tiger, and pil refers to assisting those in need.

Schofield has been described as a skillful and intelligent orator and researcher, and also as opinionated, outspoken, and intimidating. During his lectures, he occasionally made comments such as "no nation in the world can retain their colonies forever". He gained the trust of Korean independence activists.

=== March First Movement ===
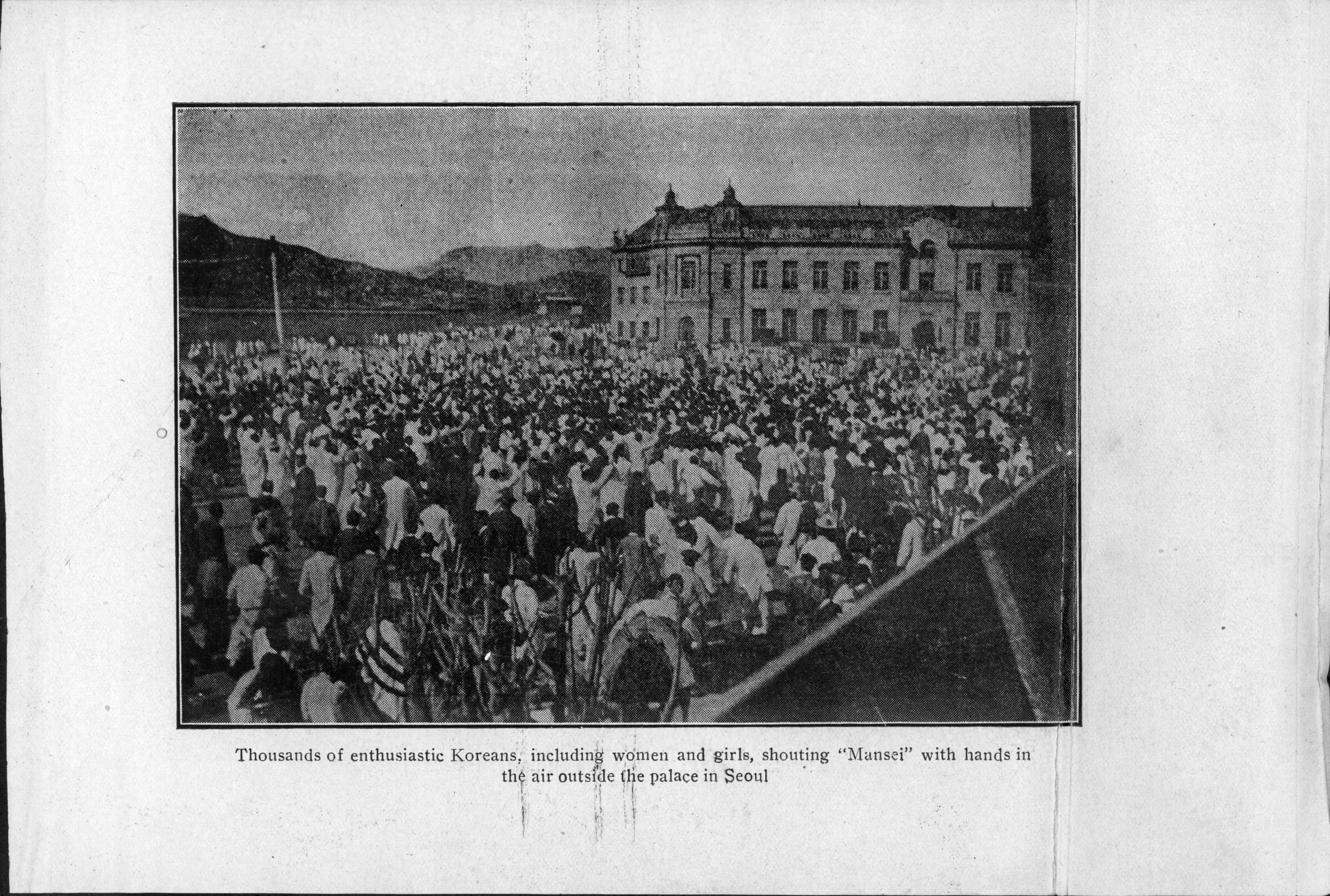
One of Schofield's photos, depicting crowds at Seoul City Hall. (March 1919)

Around early 1919, a series of events in Korea caused significant societal discontent against colonial rule. From 25 to 27 February, a series of secret meetings were held in Seoul by Korean independence activists, during which they produced a Korean Declaration of Independence and planned mass peaceful protests against Japan for 1 March. These protests persisted for months, and are now considered in South Korea to be a landmark event in Korean history.

On 28 February, Schofield became one of the only foreigners to be informed of the activists' plans in advance. One of his students, Yi Gap-seong (이갑성), gave him copies of the declaration and asked him to distribute them amongst his colleagues at the medical school and to foreign governments. Schofield, who owned a camera, was also asked to photograph the protests. Schofield warned Yi against conducting the protests. Yi replied "You are an Englishmen, so think like an imperialist [sic], but we trust you". Schofield relented and helped them.

Schofield observed the protests and photographed them surreptitiously. His photos are now considered historically significant; they were republished in international newspapers, referred to by foreign governments when conducting investigations into the protests, and are now shown in South Korean museums and textbooks. Schofield also witnessed patients at the hospital arriving with injuries from the protests, and documented these sights. He visited Seodaemun Prison and met Yu Gwan-sun, who is now remembered as a martyr and symbol of the movement.

Schofield also personally intervened in a number of arrests. He would falsely claim the arrested person was his "maid" or "houseboy", and demand they be released lest the British consulate become involved.

==== Documenting the 1919 Massacres ====
On April 6, 1919, Japanese soldiers raided Suchon-ri, a village in Suwon County, in retaliation following the March First Movement. Schofield reported eyewitness accounts from villagers stating that "before daybreak, while all were sleeping, some soldiers entered the village and had gone from house to house firing the thatched roofs which quickly caught fire," destroying 34 of 42 cottages, including the church, while shooting, bayoneting, or beating residents who tried to extinguish the flames.

Schofield visited the site on April 17, where he interviewed survivors, dressed wounds, noting severe infections, rapid pulse, and pus-filled gashes and photographed the devastation. He also noted that the village's layout, divided by a hill and valley with widely spaced houses, made accidental fire spread impossible, corroborating survivor testimony that soldiers had deliberately ignited multiple structures.

Schofield documented one confirmed death and numerous serious injuries: a man's sword-slashed arm swollen to twice its normal size, an elderly villager with bayonet punctures and rifle-butt bruises on both legs, and two others too badly beaten to move. When a local policeman denied Japanese responsibility for one of the wounded men, Schofield recorded that he "pointed out that the evidence was too strong against them." Survivors begged for protection amid constant fear of returning troops, with children foraging for herbs after food stocks had burned.

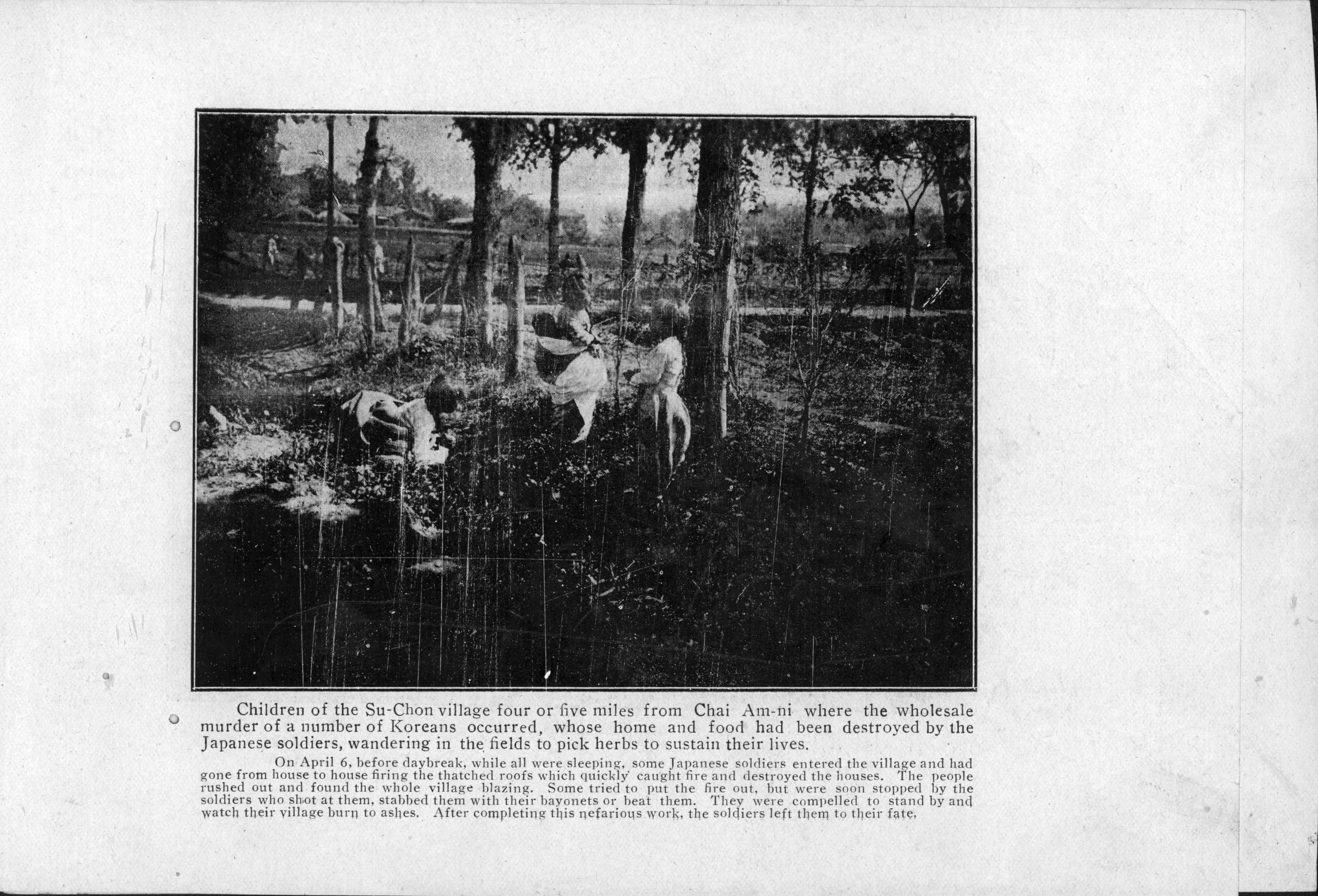
Children of Su-Chon foraging for herbs after Japanese soldiers destroyed their homes, April 1919

Other missionaries and officials corroborated his account the following day, prompting Japanese authorities to dispatch an investigation committee, supply food, and promise reconstruction. A more severe incident occurred on April 15 in the village of Jeam-ri, near Suwon. Eyewitness accounts recorded by Schofield stated that Japanese soldiers summoned adult male Christians and members of the Cheondogyo (Heavenly Way Society) to the village church under the pretense of a public lecture. Once gathered inside, soldiers fired into the building through the paper windows and then set the thatched structure on fire. Around 29 villagers were killed, most burned inside the church while others attempting to escape were shot or bayoneted outside. The village was subsequently set on fire, leaving all but eight of thirty-nine houses standing, with the church burned to the ground.

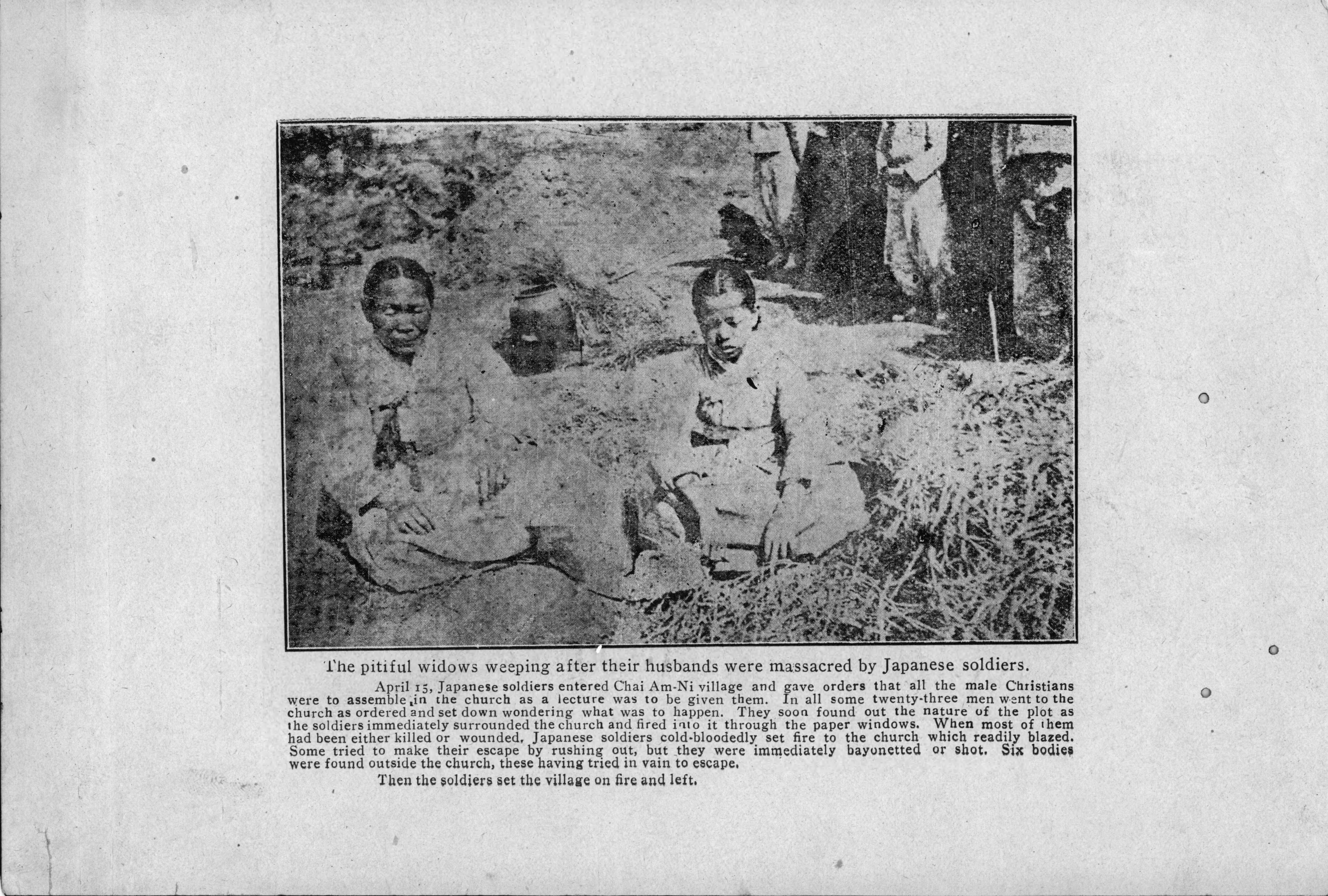
Widows at Jeam-ri after the April 15, 1919 massacre.

Schofield became aware of the massacre on April 17 and departed the following day, travelling by train to Suwon, then cycling toward the village and detouring over a mountain pass to avoid police and gendarme stations before entering the area. At the site he examined the burned village, photographed the ruins, and interviewed multiple survivors whose accounts he reported were largely consistent. Schofield concluded that the destruction had been deliberate and suggested that the killings were likely carried out in retaliation for the earlier death of a Japanese gendarme and motivated partly by hostility toward the village's Christian population, noting: "Personally I am of the opinion that two things influenced those responsible… the killing of the Gendarme… and the intense hatred of the Christians."

==== Publicizing information about the protests and massacre ====
Schofield compiled his findings into reports, including "The Massacre of Chai-Amm-ni" and "Report of the Su-chon Atrocities", and submitted them for publication in the international press. These reports circulated through missionary networks and appeared in publications such as the Shanghai Gazette and the Presbyterian Witness in 1919. Schofield's accounts were later referenced in U.S. Senate proceedings on July 15, 1919, when Senator George W. Norris cited his reports during debate over American policy toward Japan and the League of Nations, and the reporting had previously appeared in the New York Times on July 13, 1919, under the headline "Horrors in Korea Charged to Japan."

He also published articles in Korea during this time. An article was published in the colonial government–backed English-language newspaper The Seoul Press that favorably described conditions in Seodaemun Prison, which was notorious for mistreating its prisoners, as like those in a health resort. Schofield penned an anonymous response article that was published in the paper, in which he mocked the previous article and described in detail the methods of torture employed at the prison.

That summer, Schofield and missionary Bishop Welch had a contentious meeting with Japanese politicians, among whom were the Japanese colonial governor Saitō Makoto. Schofield challenged them directly at the meeting. Afterwards, he penned response articles to Japanese statements about the protests, in which he mocked their efforts to cover up or downplay them, and described in detail the violence that Japanese authorities had perpetrated.

In August, Schofield traveled to Japan on behalf of the missionaries in Korea. He met with Prime Minister Hara Takashi and other prominent Japanese politicians, advocated for further autonomy for Korea, and asked them to take action to stop the violent suppression of the protests. He gave a public lecture to hundreds of foreign missionaries, in which he openly criticized Japan. As Japan enacted several reforms that eased restrictions on Korea, Schofield published criticisms that described the reforms as superficial appeasement efforts.

=== Expulsion ===
In December, Governor-General Saitō described Schofield as an "arch agitator" and "a most dangerous man, assiduously carrying on the independence agitation in Korea". The British consulate agreed with Japan's assessment, and issued Schofield a warning to cease his activism, which he rebuffed. During this period, Schofield began to draw comparisons between Japan's colonization of Korea and British rule in Ireland and India "as a calculated challenge to the British Foreign Office":

It is to Japan's interests to be magnanimous with Korea, for if Korea has to pay as heavily for all her reforms as she is paying for the present ones Korea will always be the deadly enemy of Japan, and a serious menace whether 'assimilated' or independent... England some day will have to satisfy Ireland in most of her demands. It would have been a much wiser policy to have granted Ireland her demands earlier, and in so doing have retained the friendship of Ireland.

The colonial government began attempting to pressure Schofield into leaving Korea. His wife's health was used as a pretext for his recall to Canada; while the recall was conducted by the Presbyterian Church in Canada, it has been described as an "apparent muzzling" effort to prevent him from damaging their relationship with Japan. Upon the conclusion of Schofield's contract in March 1920, he was made to leave Korea. During his return trip via Japan and after his return, he continued submitting articles for publication to the Korean, Japanese, and international press.

Schofield appealed his recall until 1923. In 1921, he wrote to the Presbyterian Church in Canada: "As to my getting into politics in Korea when I return, there is little danger. However should the Japanese do something very bad... then I might also do something bad, but there need be little fear on this account". His appeal was debated for several years; the church feared that his political activism would damage their relationship with Japan, and was also experiencing financial difficulties. Veterinarians Barbara Legault and John F. Prescott argue that Schofield himself ultimately declined to return to Korea, in consideration of his wife's health.

Schofield visited Korea again in summer of 1926. He submitted a number of articles to the Korean newspaper The Dong-A Ilbo during and after his trip. In a 1931 letter, he wrote that he had come to identify himself as a Korean, and felt that Korea was his homeland. He gave a number of recommendations to the Korean people to improve their situation.

== Later life ==
In 1921, Schofield was made Director of Veterinary Hygiene and Research at OVC. He continued to teach and conduct research there for 35 years. During this time, Schofield continued to advocate for the Korean independence movement, and also donated to Korean orphanages and churches.

Schofield conducted research on topics related to livestock, bacteriology, and virology. Schofield published on the etiology and pathology of moldy sweet clover poisoning, which contributed to the discovery of the anticoagulant warfarin. In a 2003 memorial lecture dedicated to Schofield, speaker Tony Hayes argued that Schofield's discovery that orally-introduced substances could slow clotting was a seminal discovery of the 20th century in the veterinary field. Hayes stated that Schofield possibly benefitted from his own research: he was given warfarin after a heart attack in 1958.

In 1948, Schofield became the only Canadian founding member of the American College of Veterinary Pathologists. In 1955, he retired from OVC due to poor eyesight.

=== Return to Korea ===
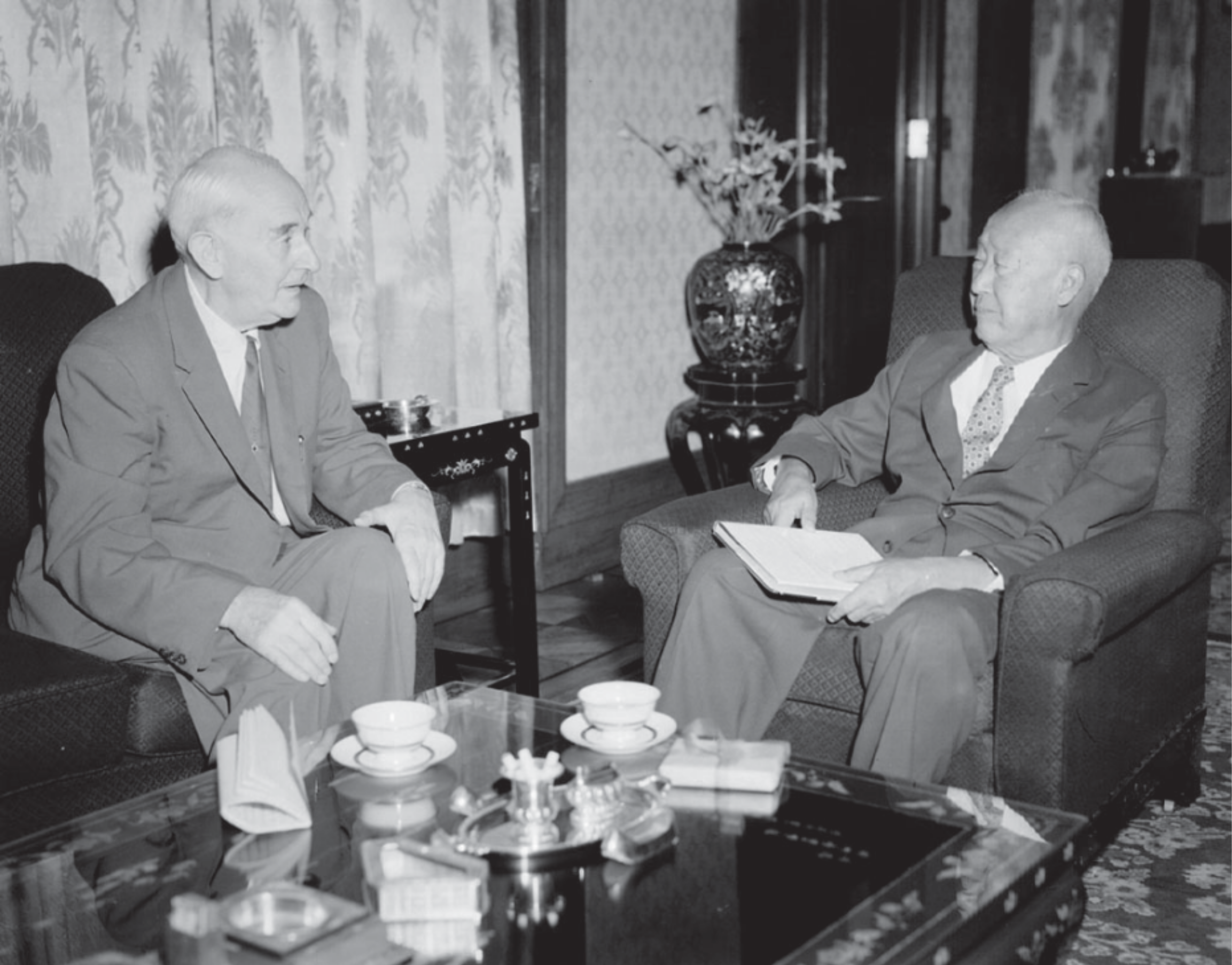
Schofield meets Rhee in 1958

Schofield's wife, Alice, died in 1957. Previously, his friends in Korea had urged him to return to the peninsula, but he had declined. In August 1958, he accepted an invitation to go to South Korea from that country's president Syngman Rhee. Upon his arrival there, he was surprised and disheartened at the state of the country, which was then recovering from the 1950–1953 Korean War; the government had a dysfunctional democracy and there were numerous orphans and unemployed people.

Schofield was made a professor of the Veterinary College of Seoul National University (SNU). While teaching there, he supported two orphanages and a vocational school, and paid to cover tuition expenses of students. He also led a youth bible study class.

Schofield became a vocal critic of Rhee's administration. He wrote articles that criticized Rhee's interference in democratic processes and restrictions on freedom of speech. He argued that open discussion was important for improvement, and evoked his experience in the March First Movement. The Rhee administration began pressuring Schofield into leaving South Korea. On one occasion, he was prevented from lecturing at SNU. The administration's pressures on him ended after the 1960 April Revolution protests against Rhee, which Schofield described as "the triumph of righteousness, courage and freedom over tyranny, corruption, brutality" and likened to the spirit of the March First Movement. After the 1961 May 16 coup, during which Park Chung Hee established a military dictatorship over South Korea, Schofield initially expressed optimism that the regime could combat corruption in the country. He later published a number of articles that criticized the regime's actions. Schofield also advocated for various other reforms, including efforts to address corruption and reform Christian churches in South Korea.

Whilst traveling abroad in 1969, Schofield experienced issues with cardiac asthma, and his health declined. He was hospitalized, but continued writing and submitted articles for publication in newspapers. On 12 April 1970, he died at Seoul National University Hospital, at the age of 81. On 16 April, a public funeral was held for him.

== Legacy ==
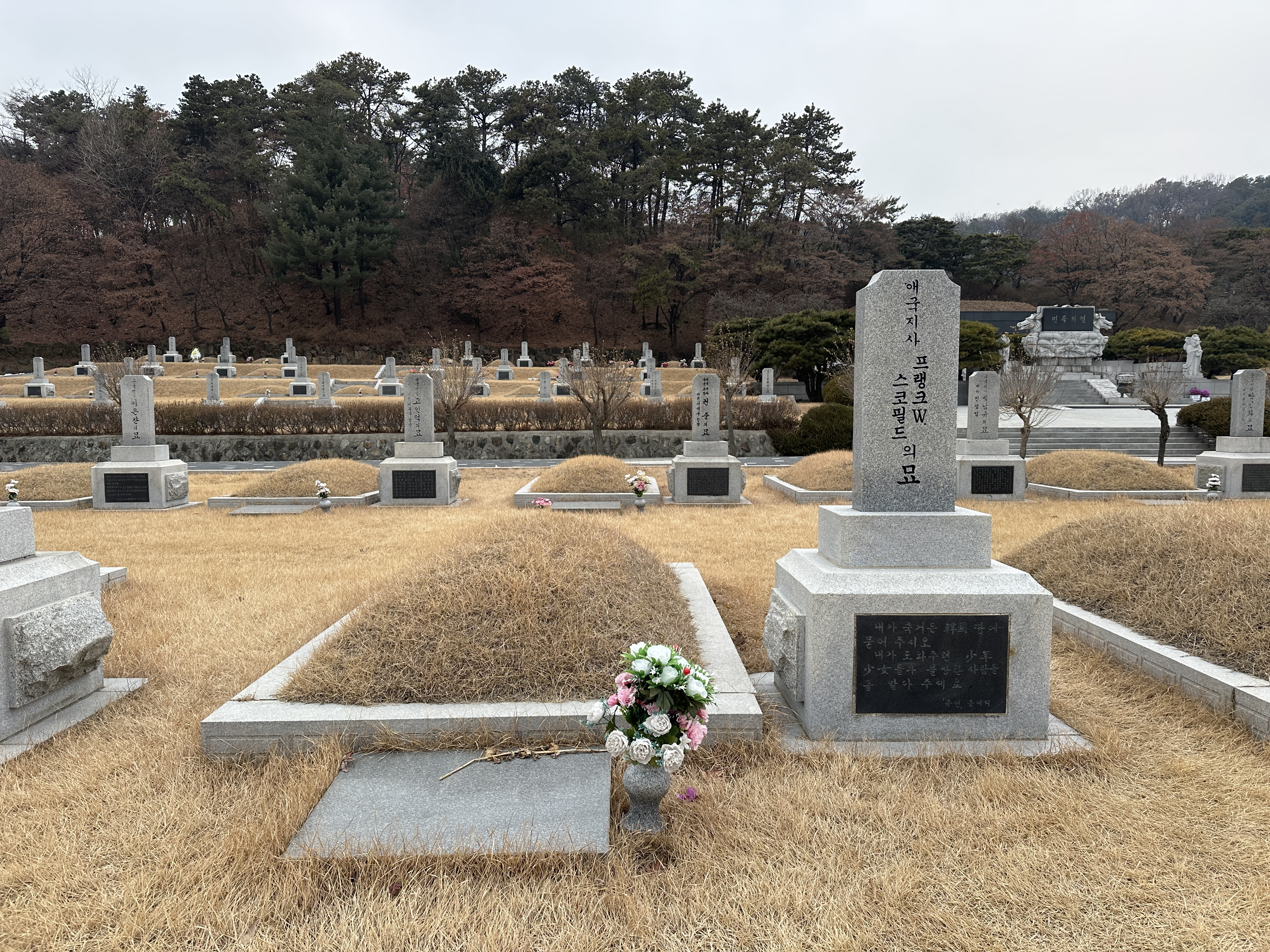
Schofield's grave (2025)

Schofield was the first foreigner to buried in Seoul National Cemetery. (Note: Other foreigners have since been buried there.)

He has been widely praised in South Korea. Former Prime Minister of South Korea Chung Il-kwon described him as "an eternal Korean". He has also been described as an instrumental figure in the March First Movement, and dubbed "the 34th man", in reference to the 33 signers of the Korean Declaration of Independence.

In 1960, he received the South Korean Order of Cultural Merit medal, as well as the Key to the City of Seoul. On 1 March 1968, he received the South Korean Order of Merit for National Foundation. In 1970, he received the Distinguished Member title from the American College of Veterinary Pathologists, the organization's highest title, in a ceremony in Seoul. In 2003, the OVC hosted a Schofield Lecture series. Around this time, their top undergraduate award for pathology was called the "Schofield Prize".

Schofield has been described as being selfless to such an extent that it impacted his own quality of life. He donated a significant amount of his own money and belongings to others; he lived in a small rented house during his time at OVC, and often lacked funds to travel.

Chung Un-chan, Prime Minister of South Korea from 2009 to 2010, later recalled that Schofield paid for his tuition expenses and served as a mentor to him. Chung wrote of this in a biography of Schofield entitled I Wish to be Buried in Korea:

Back then, my family's circumstances were such that we worried about feeding ourselves... Not only did Doctor Schofield generously provide for my tuition and expenses, he was my spiritual pillar who greatly affected the molding of my character... Having lost my father when I was young, Dr. Schofield was like a true father to me... I vividly remember him lamenting that in Korea the rich have not an iota of sympathy for the poor as he witnessed the widening gap between the rich and poor during the economic growth of the 1960s. He [...] advised me to choose economics as my major in college. He encouraged me to spend my life working to narrow the gap between the rich and the poor.

There are a number of extant memorials to Schofield. The main hall of the Canadian Embassy in Korea's chancery is dedicated to Schofield. There is a Dr. Frank Schofield Memorial Garden in the Toronto Zoo, as well as a statue dedicated to Schofield in that garden that was completed in 2011. South Korea donated $800,000 for the construction of the garden. Portions of the garden feature Korean architecture.

For the 100th anniversary of the March First Movement, the Seoul Metropolitan Government and the Canadian Embassy in South Korea hosted an exhibition at Seoul City Hall, in which Schofield and other Canadian missionaries were honored.
