= Order of Cultural Merit (South Korea) =

South Korean order of merit

Awarded by South Korea
- Type: Order of merit
- Awarded for: Outstanding meritorious services in the fields of culture and art in the interest of promoting the national culture and national development.
- Status: Active
- Grades: Geumgwan; Eungwan; Bogwan; Okgwan; Hwagwan

Precedence
- Next (higher): Grand Order of Mugunghwa
- Related: Order of National Foundation; Order of Civil Merit; Order of Military Merit; Order of Service Merit; Order of National Security Merit; Order of Diplomatic Service Merit; Order of Industrial Service Merit; Order of Saemaeul Service Merit; Order of Sports Merit; Order of Science and Technology Merit

- Order of Cultural Merit
- Hangul: 문화훈장
- Hanja: 文化勳章
- RR: Munhwa hunjang
- MR: Munhwa hunjang

The Order of Cultural Merit (Korean: 문화훈장) is one of South Korea's orders of merit. It is awarded by the President of South Korea for "outstanding meritorious services in the fields of culture and art in the interest of promoting the national culture and national development."

== Grades ==
The Order of Cultural Merit is conferred in five grades.

Grade	Name	Ribbon
1st	Geumgwan (금관)	
2nd	Eungwan (은관)	
3rd	Bogwan (보관)	
4th	Okgwan (옥관)	
5th	Hwagwan (화관)	

== Recipients ==
=== Geumgwan (Gold Crown), 1st Class ===
- Myung-whun Chung, 1996
- Shin Sang-ok, 2006
- Nam June Paik, 2007
- Yu Hyun-mok, 2009
- Park Wan-suh, 2011
- Youn Yuh-jung, 2021
- Kim Uchang, 2022
- Song Hae, 2022 (posthumous)
- Lee Jung-jae, 2022
- Hwang Dong-hyuk, 2022
- Sumi Jo, 2023
- Lee Soon-jae, 2025 (posthumous)
- Kim Ji-mee, 2025 (posthumous)
- Ahn Sung-ki, 2026 (posthumous)
- Choi Bool-am, 2026 (posthumous)

=== Eungwan (Silver Crown), 2nd Class ===
- Martina Deuchler, 1995
- Kim Duk-soo, 2007
- Lee Mi-ja, 2009
- Kun-Woo Paik, 2010
- Lee Soo-man, 2011
- Shin Young-kyun, 2011
- Ha Chun-hwa, 2011
- Kim Ki-duk, 2012
- Kim Soo-hyun, 2012
- Kim Ku-lim, 2017
- Cho Yong-pil, 2013
- Gu Bong-seo, 2013
- Ahn Sung-ki, 2013
- Patti Kim, 2013
- Park Jung-ran, 2014
- Song Hae, 2014
- Choi Bul-am, 2014
- Lee Soon-jae, 2018
- Kim Min-ki, 2018
- Hyun Ki-young, 2019
- Bong Joon-ho, 2019
- Kim Hye-ja, 2019
- Yang Hee-eun, 2019
- Ryu Je-dong, 2020
- Go Doo-shim, 2020
- Byun Hee-bong, 2020
- Yoon Hang-gi, 2020
- Han Cheol-hee, 2021
- Lee Jang-hee, 2021
- Lee Choon-yeon, 2021
- Park Chan-wook, 2022
- Kang Soo-yeon, 2022
- Kim Hae-sook, 2025

=== Bogwan (Precious Crown), 3rd Class ===
- Hai-Kyung Suh, 1980
- Yanagi Sōetsu, 1984
- Park Chan-wook, 2004
- Park Jeong-ja, 2007
- Shin Goo, 2010
- Go Eun-jung, 2010
- Im Hee-chun, 2010
- Shin Jung-hyeon, 2011
- Oh Seung-ryong, 2011
- Yoo Ho, 2011
- Lee Ho-jae, 2011
- Na Moon-hee, 2012
- Song Chang-sik, 2012
- Choi Eun-hee, 2014
- Kim Su-il, 2014
- Myung Kook-hwan, 2014
- Kadir Topbaş, 2014
- Kim Young-ok, 2018
- Im Ha-ryong, 2020
- Song Jae-ho, 2021
- Park In-hwan, 2021
- Noh Hee-gyeong, 2021
- Song Kang-ho, 2022
- Park Jin-sook, 2022
- Huh Young-man, 2022
- Lee Byung-hun, 2025
- Jung Dong-hwan, 2025
- Yoo Jae-suk, 2026

=== Okgwan (Jeweled Crown), 4th Class ===
- Kang Soo-yeon, 1987
- Moon So-ri, 2002
- Choi Min-sik, 2004 — Choi Min-sik returned the decoration badge in 2006, protesting large cuts in support programs for the arts programs of the Korean government.
- Lee Byung-hoon, 2006
- Jeon Do-yeon, 2007
- Anthony Graham Teague, 2008
- Park Jae-sang (Psy), 2012
- Lee Jung-jin, 2012
- Jo Min-su, 2012
- Song Kang-ho, 2019
- Kwon Ji-yong, 2025
- Maggie Kang, 2025
- Blackpink, 2026: (Note: In addition to the group, each member received the award individually.) Kim Ji-soo (Jisoo), Kim Jennie (Jennie), Park Chae-young (Rosé), Lalisa Manobal (Lisa)

=== Hwagwan (Flower Crown), 5th Class ===
- Ji-young Kim, 1998
- Bae Yong-joon, 2008
- BTS, 2018: (Note: In addition to the group, each member received the award individually.) Kim Nam-joon (RM), Kim Seok-jin (Jin), Min Yoon-gi (Suga), Jung Ho-seok (J-Hope), Park Ji-min (Jimin), Kim Tae-hyung (V) and Jeon Jung-kook (Jung Kook)
- O Yeong-su, 2019
- Choi Soo-jung, 2024

=== Class unknown ===
- Samuel Martin, 1994

== Bibliography ==
- Korean Overseas Information Service. (1997) A Handbook of Korea, 6th edition. Seoul, Korea: Seoul International Publishing House. OCLC 16013390
