= Joongdong High School =

Private school in Seoul, South Korea

Coordinates: 37.49296°N 127.08014°E

- Gangnam District, Seoul; South Korea

Information
- Type: Private (autonomous private high school)
- Established: 1906
- Faculty: approx. 106
- Gender: Boys
- Enrollment: approx. 1,360
- Website: www.joongdong.hs.kr

- Joongdong High School
- Hangul: 중동고등학교
- Hanja: 中東高等學校
- RR: Jungdong godeunghakgyo
- MR: Chungdong kodŭnghakkyo

Joongdong High School (Korean: 중동고등학교; Hanja: 中東高等學校) is a private school founded in 1906, located in Irwon-dong, Gangnam District, Seoul, South Korea. The school and its foundation were undertaken in 1994 by Samsung Group by the will of group's founder, Lee Byung-chul, the school's 26th graduate. This school is currently operated by Joongdong Educational Foundation.

== Reputation ==
Many of Joongdong High School students get an offer from top-tier Korean universities. In 2011, Joongdong High School ranked #1 in the number of graduates to be offered a place at Seoul National University (considered the best university in South Korea). In 2012, the entrance rate for SKY universities was 21.6%, the highest in the country.

== Notable alumni ==
- Cha Kyung-bok, football manager
- Cho Jae-min, footballer
- Kim Chi-ha, poet & playwright
- Kim Moo-sung, politician & former member of the National Assembly
- Kim Soo-hyun, actor
- Ko Jae-wook, footballer & football manager
- Lee Byung-chul, founder of Samsung Group
- Lee Byung-hun, actor
- Lee Ho, footballer
- Lee Kyu-hyung, actor
- Moon Kook-hyun, politician
- Song Wol-joo, Buddhist leader
- Yang Joo-dong, poet & Korean language scholar
- Yang Seung-jo, lawyer & governor of South Chungcheong Province
- Mingyu, singer, member of Seventeen (South Korean band)

== See also ==
- Education in South Korea
