= Exemplary Public Official Medal =

- Type: Single-grade order medal
- Awarded for: individuals who performed exemplary conducts in their public official duty
- Presented by: the Prime Minister, Speaker of the National Assembly, the Chief Justice of Supreme Court or President of Constitutional Court, and Chairperson of National Election Commission of Korea
- Eligibility: Korean Exemplary Public Official with 6th Grade or under
- Status: Currently awarded
- Established: 1973
- Related: Order of Service Merit; Order of National Security Merit

The Exemplary Public Official Medal (abbreviated to EPO as the post-nominal) (Korean: 모범공무원증서) is an award bestowed to exemplary public official with 6th Grade (Assistant Director level, Korean: 주무관)) or under, by the Prime Minister for the executive branch and devolved provincial governments, Speaker of the National Assembly of Korea for legislative branch, Chief Justice of Supreme Court and President of Constitutional Court for judicial branch, and Chairperson of National Election Commission of Korea for independent electoral commission as each of highest constitutional institution. Originally issued as a plaque under Presidential Decree #6971, dated Jan. 15, 1980. It was changed to a medal under Presidential Decree #11360, dated Feb. 18, 1984.

== Privileges ==
Initially, social privileges for those, who achieved Exemplary Public Official Medal, according to the No. 6971, Presidential Decree of the Republic of Korea.

According to Section 8-2 of the Decree, each Exemplary Public Official has rights:

- of additional payment within fifty thousand Korean Won per month for three years
- of primary consideration for promoting to higher grade
