= Anti-shamanism movement in Korea =

- "Movement to overthrow superstition"
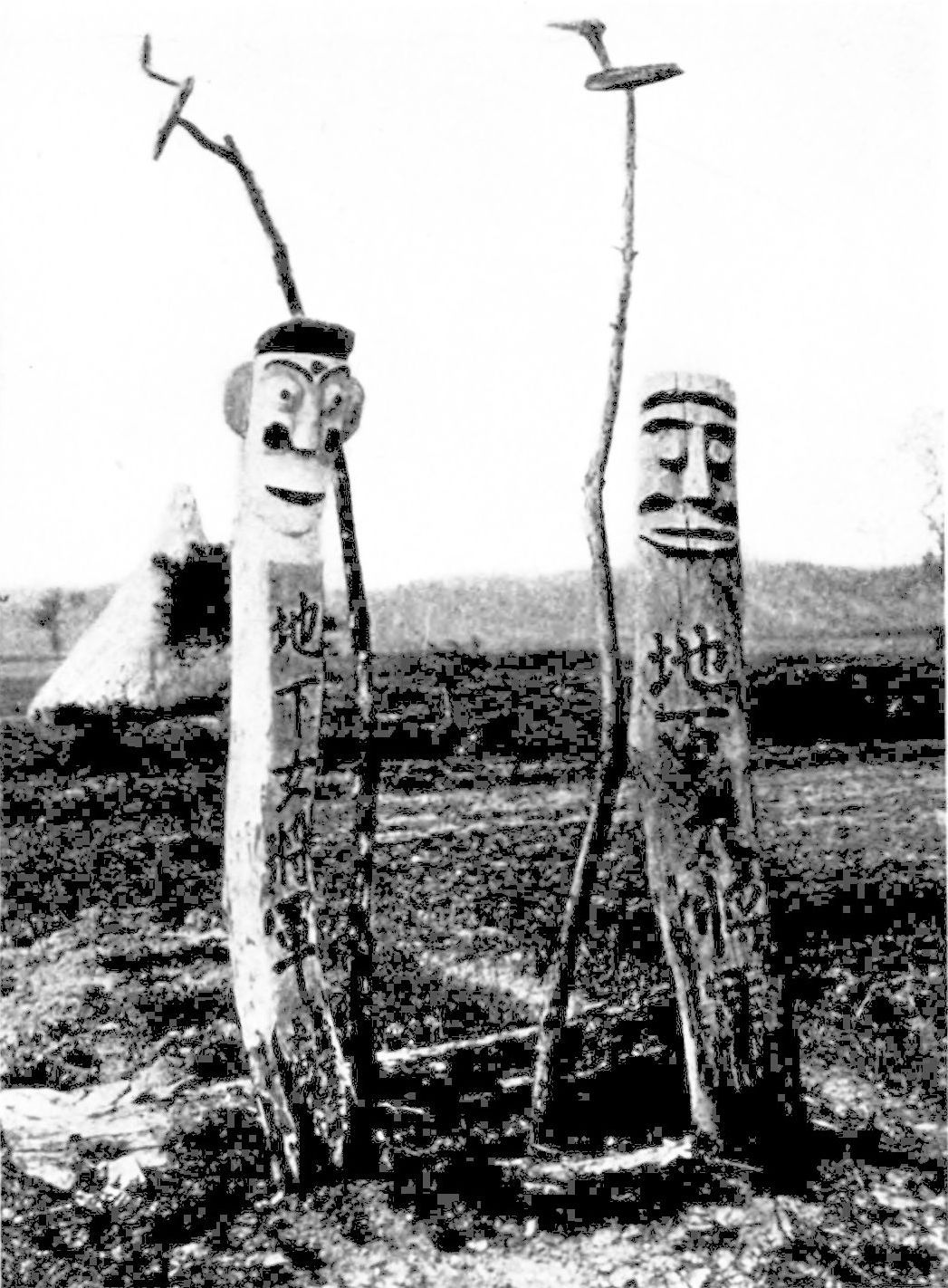
- "Village devil posts", jangseung as described in The passing of Korea (1906) by the American Protestant missionary Homer Bezaleel Hulbert.

"Movement to overthrow superstition"
- Hangul: 미신 타파 운동
- Hanja: 迷信打破運動
- RR: misin tapa undong
- MR: misin t'ap'a undong

In the history of modern and contemporary Korea, especially between the late 19th century and the 1980s, there have been a series of waves of movement to eliminate indigenous shamanism and folk religions. In Korean, the movement is called misin tapa undong (Korean: 미신 타파 운동; Hanja: 迷信打破運動; lit. 'movement to overthrow superstition'), regarding homegrown shamanism and anything related to it as "superstition" (미신; 迷信; misin); the modern Korean word for "superstition" also has the meaning of "illusory" or "false spiritual beliefs", and implies that gods and ancestors do not exist. This term was adopted from Japanese in the late 19th century, and largely emphasized by Christian missionaries to target Korean indigenous religion.

Waves of the anti-shamanism movement started in the 1890s with the rise of influence of Protestant preachers in Korea, culminating during the New Community Movement of the 20th century, in South Korea. These movements destroyed most of the indigenous cults and shrines of folk religion, which were largely replaced by Christianity.

== History ==
=== Late Joseon (1890s) ===
Protestantism became engrained in Korea in the 1890s, and with it a network of schools and hospitals. Protestant missionaries labeled indigenous religious practices and shamans as "devil worship". The missionaries led campaigns for the burning of idols, ancestral tablets, shamans' tools and clothes, and shrines. According to missionary reports, they were "destroyed as were the "books" (magic scrolls) in Ephesus". The missionaries also circulated stories about shamans who had converted to Christianity becoming themselves advocates of the destruction of the indigenous religion. The exorcistic struggle between a shaman and a Christian was made into a literary motif in Kim Tongni's colonial-period novella Portrait of a Shaman.

Missionaries found allies among Korean intellectuals in the final years of the Joseon dynasty. Together, they produced The Independent (Tongnip Sinmun), the first newspaper published in Korean language. The newspaper promoted iconoclasm and addressed government officials on the necessity to eradicate the indigenous religion.

In 1896, the police began to arrest shamans, destroy shrines and burn ritual tools. These events were acclaimed by The Independent. At one point, the newspaper even came to criticize Buddhist monks.

=== Japanese occupation (1910–1945) ===
Campaigns against Korean indigenous religious traditions also accompanied Japan's annexation of the Korean peninsula. The Japanese had already equated secularization with modernity in their own country. The colonial police harassed and sometimes arrested shamans, though official policies against Korean shamanism were neither monolithic nor consistent.

Following the rhetoric of The Independent of the foregoing generation, the colonial government portrayed the indigenous religion and the shamans as irrational and wasteful, adding the notion that they were also unhygienic. Urban people adopted this rhetoric, seeking to distinguish themselves from their own rural origins. Migrants to the cities rejected gut healing and traditional medicine.

This paradigm would have become central to the projects for countryside development enacted in the independent South Korea.

=== Post-independence (1945–present) ===
==== North Korea ====
In North Korea, most formal religious activity was suppressed. The North Korean regime systematically suppressed shamanistic practices, labeling them as remnants of “superstition” incompatible with socialist ideology and often criminalizing practitioners. Mudang and their families were targeted as members of the "hostile class" and were considered to have bad sŏngbun, "tainted blood", hence are stigmatized under the state’s songbun classification system, which linked religious affiliation with political disloyalty. As part of broader efforts to eliminate non-socialist traditions, shamanic shrines and ritual sites were destroyed, and practitioners faced harassment, imprisonment, or forced re-education.

Shamanism is the most prevalent religion in North Korea, despite the systematic repression of this belief system by the state. Every North Korean province has practitioners of Shamanism and it spans all levels of society. The criminal code of North Korea explicitly criminalizes "superstitions activities for money and goods", and those found guilty face up to 7 years in a forced labour prison camp. The code also formally criminalizes "religion and superstitions activities in minors". Several years after a government directive to eliminate "superstitious" beliefs in 2017, the practice of shamans, especially prominent shamans, was under strict investigation and management. According to a 2021 report from the human rights NGO Korea Future which identified 244 victims of religious persecution, practitioners of Shamanism were the single most numerous with 150. In 2019 in Chongjin, North Hamgyong Province, two women were shot to death publicly and a third sentenced to life in prison on trial for practicing fortune telling, and thousands of factory workers, students, and people attended the trial to discourage officials from consulting fortune tellers. In 2023 in Sinuiju, North Pyongan Province, following the discovery of " sticky rice cake" superstitions practiced by students, authorities in the country launched a nationwide anti-superstition campaign arresting dozens of fortune tellers, five of whom were later sentenced to one-year detention in a correctional labour camp.

==== South Korea ====
===== Syngman Rhee government (1948–1960) =====
Under Syngman Rhee's government, shamans in South Korea were routinely harassed and arrested by the police. Protestants in Jeju Island led a "campaign against gods", through which they tried to exterminate Jeju's religious tradition and its pantheon of 18,000 deities.

===== New Community Movement (1970s) =====
In the 1970s, the South Korean president Park Chung Hee started the Saemaul Undong (lit. 'New Community Movement'), a mass mobilization intended to transform rural society in both form and spirit. Local communities were involved in a variety of public works.

Under the banner of such reform, a formal "Movement to Overthrow Superstition" (Misin Tapa Undong) was started. With official encouragement, police and local leaders suppressed gut rites and local cults. They poured gasoline on village shrines and torched them, destroyed sacred trees, totem poles, and cairns, raided gut and arrested shamans. Contemporary commenters criticize the movement for having damaged the indigenous religious tradition and having caused much of the South Korean population to adopt the foreign Christian religion.

== Legacy ==
In the aftermath of the wave of "anti-superstition movements", Korean indigenous religion was severely weakened. Since the 1980s, however, traditional religion and shamanism have experienced a revival in South Korea. Since the 1990s, shamans started to be regarded as "bearers of culture". Today, Korean shamanism is recognized as a legitimate religion in South Korea, and there is widespread acknowledgement of "Muism" or "Sindo"—however shamanism is called—as the natural religion of the Koreans.

== See also ==
- Religious persecution
- Religion in Korea

== Sources ==
- Baker, Don (2008). Korean Spirituality. Dimensions of Asian Spirituality. Honolulu: University of Hawai'i Press. ISBN 978-0-8248-3233-9.
- Connor, Linda; Samuel, Geoffrey, eds. (2001). Healing Powers and Modernity: Traditional Medicine, Shamanism, and Science in Asian Societies. Greenwood Publishing Group. ISBN 0897897153.
- Kendall, Laurel (2010). Shamans, Nostalgias, and the IMF: South Korean Popular Religion in Motion. University of Hawaii Press. ISBN 978-0824833985.
