= Tom Kim (physician) =

Korean-American physician (1944–2026)

- Hangul: 김유근
- RR: Gim Yugeun
- MR: Kim Yugŭn

Kim Yu-geun (Korean: 김유근; December 1944 – January 16, 2026), known as Tom Kim, was a Korean-American physician who ran a free clinic called the Free Medical Clinic of America for the poor. In 2010, he received the Order of Civil Merit from the South Korean government.

== Life and career ==
Kim was born in North Korea in December 1944, but moved to South Korea with his family in 1951, when he was six years old. He later moved to the United States.

Kim died on January 16, 2026, at the age of 81.

== Bibliography ==
- Five Fingers: The Story of the Free Medical Clinic of America

== Awards ==
- Order of Civil Merit of South Korea
- Anderson County Hero Award
