= Kim Duck-soo =

South Korean educator (born 1935)

Kim Duck-Soo
- Born: 20 August 1935; Korea, Empire of Japan
- Citizenship: South Korea
- Education: Seoul National University
- Occupation: Chairman of Joongdong Educational Foundation

Korean name
- Hangul: 김득수
- Hanja: 金得洙
- RR: Gim Deuksu
- MR: Kim Tŭksu

Kim Duck-Soo (born 1935) is a South Korean educator. He is the current chairman of the board of trustees at the Joongdong Educational Foundation.

Kim graduated Seoul National University and received national security education at the Korea National Defense University. He served as the vice-superintendent of Seoul's Educational Committee and as the president of the Korea Teachers' Pension Fund, and received an Order of Service Merit from the South Korean government for his services.
