= Joongdong Educational Foundation =

Joongdong Educational Foundation 學校法人中東學園
- Company type: Private Foundation
- Industry: Education
- Founded: 1948
- Headquarters: Gangnam District, Seoul, South Korea
- Key people: Kim Duck-soo, Chairman of the Board

The Joongdong Educational Foundation (Korean: 학교법인 중동학원) is a private school corporation that operates Joongdong High School and Joongdong Middle School. Founded in 1906 as the Joongdong School (중동학교), the Joongdong Foundation was brought to its current form in 1948.

== History ==
For 17 years (1994–2011), the Samsung Group funded the Joongdong Foundation for 17, bringing it up as a leading private school corporation in South Korea.

Currently, the foundation operates 2 schools and is led by a board of trustees that consists of 7 members. The chairman of the board is Kim Duck-soo.

== Current Board of Trustees ==
Title	Name	Occupation	Term
Trustee
Chairman	Kim Duck-soo	Chairman, Gwanak Educational Foundation	2012 1/1; ~ 2016 1/9
Member	Kim Sung-duk	Official, Ministry of Education	2012 4/30; ~ 2016 4/30
Member	Yoo Mu-sung	Chairman, Samyoung Chemical Co., Ltd.	2012 4/30; ~ 2016 4/30
Member	Shim Jae-gon	President, Korea Environment & Resources Corporation	2012 4/30; ~ 2016 4/30
Member	Kim Byung-taek	Professor, Sungkyunkwan University	2010 4/6; ~ 2014 4/6
Member	Chun Yong-uk	Vice President, Usong University	2012 5/29; ~ 2016 5/29
Member	Song Young-soo	Professor, Hanyang University	2010 4/6; ~ 2014 4/6
Audit
Audit	Kim Ho-geun	President, Korea Authorized Textbooks	2012 4/14; ~ 2016 4/14
