= Chai-Shin Yu =

Korean-Canadian Koreanist (1932–2023)

- Born: April 11, 1932; Ch'aho, Korea, Empire of Japan
- Died: April 24, 2023 (aged 91); Toronto, Ontario, Canada
- Education: Hartford Seminary Foundation
- Alma mater: McMaster University
- Occupations: Academic, professor, pastor
- Spouse: Ena Yu

Korean name
- Hangul: 유재신
- Hanja: 劉在信
- RR: Yu Jaesin
- MR: Yu Chaesin
- Website: chaishinyu.com

Chai-Shin Yu (April 11, 1932 – April 24, 2023) was a Korean-Canadian academic and a distinguished professor of Korean studies at the University of Toronto. Yu helped establish Korean Studies at U of T, being one of the first people to teach a Korean studies course at a Canadian university. Before teaching Korean studies, he was a pastor for the local Korean community at the Korean Metro United Church.

== Biography ==
Chai-Shin Yu was born on April 11, 1932, in Ch'aho, Korea during the Japanese colonial period. In 1948, Yu fled from the Soviet-occupied North Korea to South Korea to escape religious persecution and further his studies. In 1964, he immigrated from South Korea to the United States to study theology. He received a Master of Arts degree from Hartford Seminary Foundation in 1967, and then received a Master of Arts in religion in 1969 from McMaster University for his graduate thesis, A Critical Examination of Suzuki's Understanding of Ch'an (Zen) Buddhism. In 1970, Yu was ordained as a minister of the United Church of Canada. In 1973, Yu was awarded his PhD in Religious Sciences for his PhD thesis, A Comparative Study of the Founder's Authority, the Community, and the Discipline in Early Buddhism and in Early Christianity. He would also be inducted as the pastor of the Korean Metro United Church (Korean: 토론토한인교회) in the same year.

In 1977, Chai-Shin Yu was appointed as a visiting part-time assistant professor at the University of Toronto to teach EAS 270: Introduction to Korean Studies, which would become the first course in the Korean studies program. Yu would continue to add more courses to the Korean studies program during his tenure at U of T. On July 1, 1982, Yu would be promoted to associate professor. On June 19, 1997, for his contributions to founding the Korean studies program, U of T recognized Yu as a distinguished professor of Korean studies. Yu was given the Seongnyu Medal of the Order of Civil Merit by the South Korean government in 2006. On March 7, 2017, Yu was given the KBS (Korean Broadcast Service) Global Korean Award in the humanities, social sciences & education category for his contribution in helping promote Korean studies in Canada.

Dr.Yu established Korean Studies and the Korean Library at the University of Toronto. He started the Korean Gallery at the Royal Ontario Museum (The ROM). He published 17 books about Korean-Asian thought and culture and thought written in English and 3 more books written in Korean.

On April 24, 2023, Chai-Shin Yu died of chronic illness in Toronto.

== Works ==
- Yu, Chai-Shin (1977). Korean and Asian Religious Tradition. Toronto: The Society For Korean And Related Studies.
- Yu, Chai-Shin (1981). Early Buddhism and Christianity: A Comparative Study of the Founders' Authority, the Community and the Discipline. Delhi: Motilal Barnasidass. ISBN 8120800508.
  - Review: Chappell, David W. (1982). "Early Buddhism and Christianity". Buddhist-Christian Studies. 2: 149. doi:10.2307/1390083.
- Yu, Chai-Shin (1986). Korean Folk Tales. Hai-ja, Bang (illustrator). Kensington Educational
- Yu, Chai Shin (1988). Shamanism: The Spirit World of Korea. Guisso, R.W.L. (ed.). Jain Publishing Company, Inc. ISBN 978-0-89581-886-7
- Yu, Chai Shin (1988). Unconditional Love: The autobiography of Chai-Shin Yu. Burlington, ON: Welch Publishing. ISBN 978-1-55011-047-0
- Yu, Chai Shin (1989). Introduction of Buddhism to Korea: New Cultural Patterns. Lancaster, Lewis R. (ed.). Fremont, CA: Jain Publishing Company, Inc. ISBN 978-0-89581-888-1
- Yu, Chai Shin (1991). Assimilation of Buddhism in Korea: Religious Maturity and Innovation in the Silla Dynasty. Lancaster, Lewis R. (ed.). Fremont, CA: Jain Publishing Company, Inc. ISBN 978-0-89581-889-8
- Yu, Chai Shin (1996). Buddhism in the Early Choson: Suppression and Transformation. Lancaster, Lewis R. (ed.). Fremont, CA: Jain Publishing Company, Inc. ISBN 978-0-89581-891-1
- Yu, Chai Shin (1996). Buddhism in Koryo: A Royal Religion. Lancaster, Lewis R. (ed.). Fremont, CA: Jain Publishing Company, Inc. ISBN 978-0-89581-890-4
- Yu, Chai-Shin (1999). Early Buddhism and Christianity: A Comparative Study of the Founders' Authority, the Community and the Discipline. Motilal Banarsidass Pub. ISBN 978-81-208-0050-2
- Yu, Chai-Shin (2002). The Founding of Catholic Tradition in Korea. Fremont, CA: Jain Publishing Company, Inc. ISBN 978-0-89581-892-8
- Yu, Chai-Shin (2004). Korea and Christianity. Fremont, CA: Jain Publishing Company, Inc. ISBN 978-0-89581-882-9
- Yu, Chai-Shin (2010). Korean Thought and Culture: A New Introduction. Trafford Publishing. ISBN 978-1-4269-4496-3
- Yu, Chai-Shin (2011). Lee, Tae Ho (ed.). Early Korean Art and Culture: Koguryo Tomb Paintings. Toronto: Society for Korean and Related Studies. ISBN 978-0968107270.
- Yu, Chai-Shin (2012). The New History of Korean Civilization. Bloomington, IN: IUniverse. ISBN 9781462055609.
- Yu, Chai-Shin (2014). Modern Korean Thinkers. Toronto: The Society For Korean And Related Studies
- Yu, Chai-Shin (2015). Korean Influence on Chinese Culture. Toronto: Society for Korean and Related Studies. ISBN 978-0991966714.
- Yu, Chai-Shin (2016). Neo-Confucianism in Korea. Fremont, CA: Jain Publishing Company, Inc. ISBN 978-0-87573-106-3
