= Freedom of religion in South Korea =

Freedom of religion in South Korea is provided for in the South Korean constitution; the South Korean government has generally respected this right in practice.

== Laws guaranteeing the right to freedom of religion ==
=== Constitutional laws ===
Freedom of religion for all citizens and the separation of the state and religious organizations is guaranteed by the Constitution of the Republic of Korea, article 20.

(1) All citizens shall enjoy the freedom of religion.

(2) No state religion shall be recognized, and religion and state shall be separated.

Moreover, any discrimination based on a citizen's religious belief is strictly forbidden by Article 11 :

(1) All citizens shall be equal before the law, and there shall be no discrimination in political, economic, social, or cultural life on account of sex, religion, or social status.

=== International laws and treaties ===
==== International Covenant on Civil and Political Rights (ICCPR) ====
The Republic of Korea is a member party to the UN multilateral treaty International Covenant on Civil and Political Rights (ICCPR) which provides that every individual has the right and freedom to adopt a religion or belief of his/ her choice and to manifest his/ her religion or belief either individually or in community with others, either in public or private (article 18), every individual has the right to be free from discrimination based on religious belief (Article 2) and this right is irrevocable even in conditions of emergency which threatens the life of the nation (Article 4). The government has the duty to guarantee all individuals equal and effective protection against religious discrimination (Article 26).

Individuals have also the freedom to profess non-theistic and atheistic beliefs as well as the right not to profess any religion or belief. The terms belief and religion are to be broadly construed. (UN Human Rights Committee, General comment 22, 30 July 1993)

== Relationship between religious organizations and the state ==
=== Legal status of religious organizations ===
There is neither an official religion nor state atheism in the Republic of Korea. Also, unlike in many other countries, the government does not compile any list of recognized religions. Thus, there cannot be said that any religious organization is more legitimate than other in Korea, from a legal point of view. All religious organizations are equal before the law, regardless of the number of members, number of years since founding or their beliefs. There is in fact no specific law that regulates religious activities. Religious groups manage their assets through two types of legal personality: civil associations (사단) or foundations (재단).

In 2011 there were 382 civil associations and 322 foundations related to various religious organizations.

== Independent research ==
=== Pew research center's Government Restrictions Index ===
According to Pew research Center's Government Restrictions Index which measures the overall level of restrictions that the government places on religious organizations using an aggregate score of 20 indicators and then classifies countries in four categories (Low - the best category, Medium, High and Very High). In the 2009 respectively 2011 indexes South Korea was placed in the category Low and in the 2015 index the country was placed in the category Moderate.

=== Freedom House ===
In 2023, the country was scored 4 out of 4 for religious freedom; however, it was noted that a halt on mosque building may be due to discrimination.

== Religious demography ==
South Korea has an area of 38,023 square miles (98,480 km^{2}) and a population of 52 million people in 2022. According to the 2015 national census, 56.1% of people have no religious beliefs, 19.7% of the population is Protestant, 15.5% follow Korean Buddhism and 7.9% follow Catholicism. About 0.8% of South Koreans follow other religions, including Won Buddhism, Confucianism, Cheondoism, Daesun Jinrihoe, Islam, Daejongism, Jeungsanism and Eastern Orthodox Christianity.

In 2007, Buddhism had 27 orders within the country. The Catholic Church had 16 dioceses. Within the major Protestant traditions there were a total of 121 denominations, approximately 90 percent of which are separate Presbyterian groups. The Christian Council of Korea (CCK) reported that there were an estimated 75 Protestant denominations with at least 100 congregations nationwide, including Methodist, Lutheran, Baptist, Presbyterian, Anglican, and the Korean Gospel Church Assembly.

== Status of religious freedom ==
=== Legal and policy framework ===
There is no state religion in South Korea. There are no government-established requirements for religious recognition. The Traditional Temples Preservation Law protects cultural properties including Buddhist temples, which receive some subsidies from the government for their preservation and upkeep. Buddha's Birthday and Christmas are the only national holidays that are religious in nature.

The government does not permit religious instruction in public schools. Private schools are free to conduct religious activities.

In 2007, the 'Religious Affairs Bureau' of the Ministry of Culture and Tourism in South Korea took the lead in organizing groups such as the Korean Religious Council and the Council for Peaceful Religions to promote interfaith dialogue and understanding. The Bureau was also responsible for planning regular events such as the Religion and Art Festival, the Seminar for Religious Leaders, and the Symposium for Religious Newspapers and Journalists.

=== Restrictions on religious freedom ===
In 2018, a Constitutional Court ruling found that the government could not imprison conscientious objectors, as they had done for many years, but had to provide alternative forms of service for them.

== See also ==
- Religion in South Korea
- Irreligion in South Korea
- Korean Buddhism
- Christianity in Korea
- Seohak
- Human rights in South Korea
