= Yeon Cheon Oh =

South Korean political scientist (born 1951)

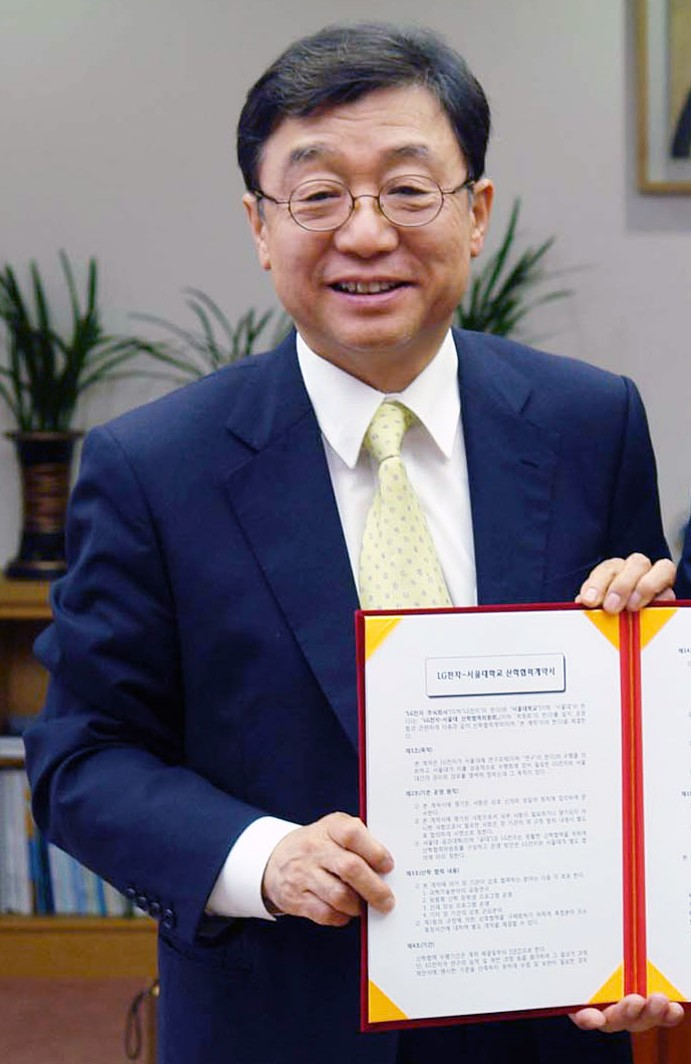

President of the University of Ulsan
- Incumbent
- Assumed office 2015

Personal details
- Born: 1951 (age 74–75) South Korea
- Education: Seoul National University; New York University
- Profession: University president
- Awards: Order of Service Merit, South Korea
- Website: http://en.ulsan.ac.kr/contents/about/president/message/

Yeon Cheon Oh (Korean: 오연천; born 1951) is a South Korean academic. He served as the president of Seoul National University from 2010 to 2014, and as president of University of Ulsan since 2015.

== Early life ==
Oh received his B.A. degree in political science from Seoul National University in 1984. In 1982, he received his Ph.D. degree in public administration from New York University in the United States.

== Career ==
From 1983 to 2010, he was a professor at school of public policy, Seoul National University. From 2000 to 2004, he was dean of the graduate school of public administration at the same university. From 2010-2014, he was the president of Seoul National University. From 2014 to 2015, he was the Koret Fellow at Stanford University Shorenstein Asia-Pacific Research Center. In 2015, he became the president of University of Ulsan. In 2016, he established a cooperation agreement between the University of Zagreb in Croatia and the University of Ulsan.

== Awards ==
In 2005, Oh was awarded the Order of Service Merit for the development of information technology in South Korea.
