= Kim Dai-Sung =

South Korean glass engineer and industrial adviser (1930–2007)

- 김대성
- Born: 1930
- Died: 2007 (aged 76–77)
- Other names: "Uncle Kim"; "Harimau" ("the Tiger")
- Alma mater: Seoul National University
- Occupations: Glass engineer, industrial adviser
- Known for: Building the S.K.P. Gelas glass factory at Shah Alam, Malaysia
- Spouse: Son Kyung-hee (손경희)
- Children: 3
- Awards: Order of Industrial Service Merit, Silver Tower (1963)

- Kim Dai-Sung
- Hangul: 김대성
- Hanja: 金大成
- Revised Romanization: Gim Daeseong
- McCune–Reischauer: Kim Taesŏng

Kim Dai-Sung (Korean: 김대성; Hanja: 金大成; 1930–2007) was a South Korean glass engineer and industrial adviser. After nearly two decades in the Korean glass industry, he built a glass factory at Shah Alam for a Malaysian police cooperative in 1975, which the Kyunghyang Shinmun described as Malaysia's first. He spent 24 years in Malaysia, where he later advised Korean companies and the Malaysian government agency Majlis Amanah Rakyat (MARA). In Malaysia he was known as "Uncle Kim" and as "Harimau" (Malay for "tiger"), rendered "Harimao" in a 1995 YTN documentary about him. In retirement in New Jersey he ran a volunteer program for Korean immigrants.

== Early life and education ==
Kim graduated from the College of Commerce of Seoul National University. During the Korean War he worked with the United States Marine Corps, where he learned English.

== Career in Korea ==
In 1955 Kim and his uncle, the industrialist and National Assembly member Kim Bong-jae, founded Dae Han Glass (대한유리), with Kim Bong-jae as its representative director. Kim worked there for about twenty years, first as plant manager and then as managing director. On 15 August 1963, as managing director of Dae Han Glass, he received the Silver Tower of the Order of Industrial Service Merit.

== Malaysia ==
In 1972, while returning from business in the Middle East, Kim stopped in Malaysia and met the Deputy Home Minister, Samad, who asked him to build a glass factory for the country. He became technical adviser to the welfare cooperative of the Royal Malaysia Police and in 1973 signed a five-year contract to build and run the plant. The factory, operated by the cooperative's subsidiary S.K.P. Gelas Sdn Bhd, was built at Shah Alam with Korean-made machinery and technicians brought from Dae Han Glass, and was completed on 31 December 1975, six months after construction began, at a cost of M$3.3 million. By 1977 it produced about 5,000 glass items a day, had reached M$1 million in sales in its first eleven months, and had trained 35 Malaysian technicians. S.K.P. Gelas appears among the Korean investments in Malaysia recorded up to 1980. Kim left the company on 1 July 1980.

In the years that followed he headed the Malaysian subsidiary of POSCO, advised Samsung Engineering, and held a director-level post at a Malaysian industrial development agency; he stayed in Malaysia until 1996. A 1995 YTN report described him as chief adviser to MARA and its only foreign staff member.

== Later life ==
Kim moved to the United States in 1996 and settled in Edgewater, New Jersey. In September 2002 he and his wife joined the AmeriCorps program of the International Institute of New Jersey as its coordinators for the Asian community. Working with the Fort Lee Korean American Association and the Fort Lee Police Department, he taught free English classes for adults, Chinese classes, and drunk-driving and youth crime prevention courses. The association gave him a plaque of thanks in December 2002, and the Fort Lee Police Department and others honored him and his wife at the program's graduation in August 2003. He spoke Korean, English, Japanese, Chinese and Malay.

== Personal life ==
Kim married Son Kyung-hee; they had one son and two daughters.
