= Trần Văn Tuý =

Vietnamses politician (born 1957)

Secretary of the Bắc Ninh Province Party Committee
- Incumbent
- Assumed office 22 February 2011

Personal details
- Born: 20 July 1957 (age 69) Bắc Ninh, Vietnam
- Party: Communist Party

Trần Văn Tuý (born 20 July 1957 in Bắc Ninh Province) is the Secretary of the Party Committee in Bắc Ninh province. He is a member of the 11th Central Committee.
