= Irreligion in South Korea =

Religion in South Korea (2015 census)
1. Irreligious (56.1%)
2. Protestantism (19.7%)
3. Korean Buddhism (15.5%)
4. Catholicism (7.90%)
5. Other (0.80%)

Irreligion in South Korea (Korean: 한국의 무종교) is common, with 56% percent of the population saying they are not affiliated with a religion, as of the 2015 national census. South Korea also has the 5th largest population of atheists in the world, according to a 2012 Gallup International poll, which found that 15% of South Koreans were "convinced atheists." According to a 2021 Gallup Korea poll, 60% identify with no religion, 17% with Protestantism, 16% with Buddhism, 6% with Catholicism, and 1% with other religions.

== Demographics ==
=== South Koreans with no religious affiliation by year (1985–2015) ===
Year	Percent	People
1985	57%	23,216,356
1995	49%	21,953,315
2005	46%	21,865,160
2015	56%	27,498,715

=== South Koreans with no religious affiliation by age (2015) ===
Age	Percent
20–29	65%
30–39	62%
40–49	57%
50–59	49%
60–69	42%
70–79	41%
80–85	42%
above 85	43%

=== South Koreans with no religious affiliation by gender (2015) ===
Gender	Percent
Male	61%
Female	52%

== History ==
Prior to the 20th century, Korean society was Neo-Confucian, and most Koreans were nontheists, who were not concerned with the question of whether or not God existed. Following the division of Korea in the mid-20th century, approximately 88% of South Koreans said they had no religious affiliation in 1964. While religiousness in South Korea experienced a sharp rise in the 20th century, the majority of South Koreans (56%) had no religious affiliation as of 2015 national census. According to a 2012 Gallup International poll, 15% of South Koreans said they were "convinced atheists," an increase from 11% in 2005.

According to some experts, contemporary irreligion in South Korea can be partially attributed to South Koreans' distrust of hierarchical organizations like religious groups. Experts also point to South Korea's demanding education and work systems as reasons why few young South Koreans participate in organized religion.

== See also ==
- Religion in South Korea
