= Saemaul Undong =

1970 South Korean economic initiative

- Saemaul Flag

Korean name
- Hangul: 새마을 운동
- Hanja: 새마을運動
- RR: Saemaeul undong
- MR: Saemaŭl undong

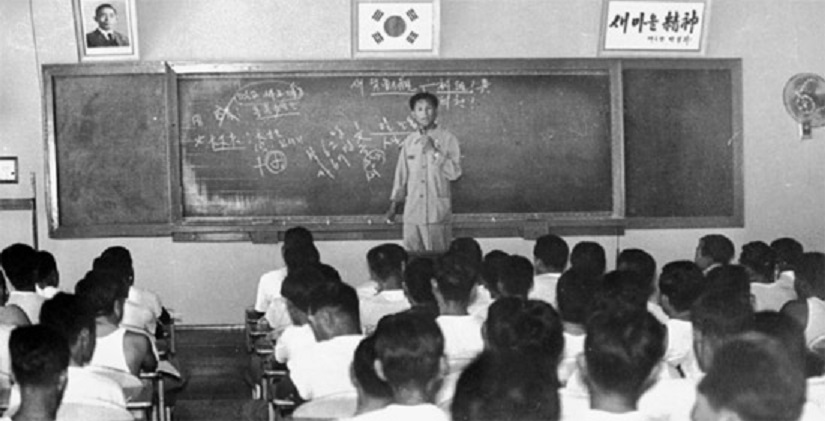
Education of Saemaul leaders

The Saemaul Undong (Korean: 새마을 운동), also known as the New Community Movement, New Village Movement, Saemaul Movement or Saema'eul Movement, was a political initiative launched on April 22, 1970 by South Korean president Park Chung Hee to modernize the rural South Korean economy. The idea was based on the Korean traditional communalism called Hyangyak (향약; 鄕約) and Dure (두레), which provided the rules for self-governance and cooperation in traditional Korean communities. In fact, the New Village Movement itself originated from a rural development project called Saemaul Sa-up (새마을사업 [New Village Project]), which was initiated by Dr. Kwak Ye-soon through the Saemaul Sa-up Hwe (새마을사업회 [Incorporated Association of the New Village Project]), an organization he founded in 1964. In the 1950s and 60s, Dr. Kwak became one of the largest capitalists in Korea through his medical business. He began providing free medical services to the poor from the late 1950s. In addition, in 1964, he established the Saemaul Sa-up Hwe and launched several rural development projects in his hometown, Cheongdo County (청도군), North Gyeongsang Province, using his personal funds as a financial resource. He directly planned and directed all the project processes in collaboration with local people. These initiatives included the construction of modern houses, roads, and water and electricity infrastructure, as well as the provision of free medical services and the education of farmers. President Park encountered the project by chance during a nationwide inspection tour. Inspired by this work, President Park benchmarked Dr. Kwak’s project and initiated the New Village Movement as a nationwide campaign from 1970. The movement initially sought to rectify the growing disparity of the standard of living between the nation's urban centers, which were rapidly industrializing, and the small villages, which continued to be mired in poverty. Diligence, self-help and collaboration were the slogans to encourage community members to participate in the development process. The early stage of the movement focused on improving the basic living conditions and environments, whereas later projects concentrated on building rural infrastructure and increasing community income. Though hailed as a great success by force in the 1970s, the movement lost momentum during the 1980s due to the unexpected assassination of Park Chung Hee.

== Overview ==
The movement promoted self-help and collaboration among the people during its first phase, as the central government provided a fixed amount of raw materials to each of the participating villages free of charge and entrusted the locals to build whatever they wished with them. The government first selected 33,267 villages and provided 335 sacks of cement. 16,600 villages that demonstrated success were then granted additional resources of 500 sacks of cement and a ton of iron bars.

The New Community Movement did much to improve infrastructure in rural South Korea, bringing modernized facilities such as irrigation systems, bridges and roads in rural communities. The program also marked the widespread appearance of orange tiled houses throughout the countryside, replacing the traditional thatched or choga-jip houses. Encouraged by the success in rural areas, the movement spread through factories and urban areas as well, and became a nationwide modernization movement.

However, despite the Saemaul Movement's great success in reducing poverty and improving living conditions in rural areas during its first phase, income levels in urban areas were still higher than income levels in rural areas after the rapid industrialization of South Korea. The government-led movement with its highly centralized organization proved to be efficient in the 1970s and early 1980s, but it became less effective after South Korea entered into a more developed and industrialized stage, which diminished the momentum of the movement. The relatively low income levels in rural areas compared to urban areas became a major political issue in the late 1980s – one that no government intervention was able to fully solve during the first phase – and the movement proved ultimately inadequate in addressing the larger problem of migration from the villages to the cities by the country's younger demographic. Moreover, the government-led centralized system caused corruption, such as misuse of funding, and changed South Korea's environment.

Recognizing these problems, the South Korean government changed the centralized structure of the movement by empowering civil society to lead the movement. Since 1998, the Saemaul Movement has entered into the second phase, focusing on new issues such as enhancing voluntary services in the community and international cooperation with developing countries.

Many developing countries in Africa are paying attention to the implications of the Saemaul Undong. Through the program such as Yonsei-KOICA Master's Degree Program, the Korean government is helping officials working in developing countries to design and implement new policies and programs in the context of national development policies.

A 2022 study attributed the initiative with shoring up support for Park Chung Hee's authoritarian regime. The initiative had persistent effects, leading to greater support for the dictator's daughter when she was democratically elected in 2012.

== Basic steps ==
The Korea Saemaul Undong Center explains how Saemaul Undong was practiced in the 1970s in South Korea in five steps:

Step 1. Basic Arrangements

1. Three elements of Saemaul Undong: people, seed money, basic principles
2. Forming a Core Group 1: Leaders
3. Forming a Core Group 2: Working groups
4. Incorporating a Core Group 3: Existing organizations
5. Forming a Core Group 4: Sectoral organizations
6. Raising Seed Money 1: Through sample cooperative projects
7. Raising Seed Money 2: Through cooperative works

Step 2: Operation of Projects

1. Establishing principles and standards for selecting projects
2. Planning a project
3. Persuading villagers 1: Setting a model to villagers
4. Persuading villagers 2: Encouraging 'you can do it' spirit
5. Collecting consensus 1: Small group meetings
6. Collecting consensus 2: General meeting of villagers
7. Letting everybody play a part
8. Preparing and managing public property
9. Establishing the local Saemaul Movement Center
10. Encouraging 'we are the one' spirit
11. Cooperating with other communities and the government

Step 3: Main Stage of Project Operation

1. Project 1 for living environment improvement: Improving the houses
2. Project 2 for living environment improvement: Eliminating inconveniences in the village
3. Project 3 for living environment improvement: Creating an environment for increasing income
4. Project 1 for income increase: Removing the obstacles
5. Project 2 for income increase: Launching cooperative projects
6. Project 3 for income increase: Commercializing things around you
7. Project 4 for income increase: Introducing new ideas
8. Project 5 for income increase: Modifying distribution system
9. Project 6 for income increase: Operating a factory
10. Consolidating community 1: Enhancing morals and communalism
11. Consolidating community 2: Providing a cultural center and other facilities
12. Consolidating community 3: Establishing a credit union

Step 4: Final Stage of the Project

1. Sharing the results and celebrating the success
2. Sharing the long-term prospects
3. Stabilizing of joint funds
4. Encouraging the Activities of sectional organizations
5. Regularizing meetings for technology research
6. Establishing a village hall
7. Publishing a local newspaper
8. Establishing a partnership with other regions and government offices
9. Setting up a sisterhood relationship with foreign countries

Step 5: Feedback at National Level

1. The government creates a favorable environment
2. The government provides supplies and funds
3. The government establishes a comprehensive support system
4. The government provides intensive information and technology education at the Saemaul Training Center

== Criticism ==
During the late 1960s and 1970s when the policy started being implemented under the regime of President Park, local traditions and beliefs were discouraged or neglected. The movement Misin tapa undong ("to defeat the worship of gods"), also described as "movement to destroy superstition") reached its peak during the Saemaul Undong period. Some of the zelkova trees that had stood at village entrances and have traditionally served as guardian figures were cut down in order to erase "superstition". However, it was largely depending on local leadership and authorities therefore not a nationwide policy. In fact, many of the villages still kept these trees during President Park's regime.

Practitioners of Korean shamanism faced periodic harassment during the movement, contributing the marginalization of traditional practices. However, Korean folk traditions were still practiced during President Park's regime, but were mainly practiced in private or rural areas. Some practices were able to be revived during the country democratization.

Saemaul Undong meetings were operated within an authoritarian political system. Although the movement was primarily focused on rural development, it was also to reinforce dedication to Park's military regime. Political repression and arrests of dissidents however, were carried out by state security agencies.

== See also ==
- Order of Saemaeul Service Merit
- Demographics of South Korea
- Economy of South Korea
- History of South Korea
- Chollima Movement
