= Order of Industrial Service Merit =

South Korean government award

Order of Industrial Service Merit 산업훈장
- Type: Order of merit
- Country: Republic of Korea
- Status: Currently awarded
- President: President Lee Jae Myung
- Grades: Gold Tower; Silver Tower; Bronze Tower; Iron Tower; Tin Tower

Precedence
- Next (higher): Order of Diplomatic Service Merit
- Next (lower): Order of Saemaeul Service Merit
- Related: Industrial Service Medal

The Order of Industrial Service Merit (Korean: 산업훈장; Hanja: 産業勳章) is an order of merit of South Korea (the Republic of Korea). It is presented to individuals and businesses who have contributed to the development of industry and the national economy.

Before the Order of Science and Technology Merit was established, the Order of Industrial Service Merit had been bestowed to scientists and technologists.

== Grades ==
The Order of Industrial Service Merit is divided into five classes. The grades are as follows:

1. Gold Tower: 금 탑(金 塔)
2. Silver Tower: 은 탑(銀 塔)
3. Bronze Tower: 동 탑(銅 塔)
4. Iron Tower: 철 탑(鐵 塔)
5. Tin Tower: 석 탑(錫 塔)

Ribbons of the order
Gold Tower	Silver Tower	Bronze Tower	Iron Tower	Tin Tower

== Notable recipients ==
- Cho Yang-ho
- Chung Joon-Yang
- Daou Technology Inc.
- Hyun Jae-hyun
- Hyundai Engineering (HEC)
- Kang Duk-soo
- Kim Dai-Sung
- Kim Joong-up
- Kim S. Joon
- Kim Swoo-geun
- Kim Chong-Hee
- Carl Ferris Miller
- Ssangyong Engineering and Construction
