= Order of Science and Technology Merit =

South Korean government award

Order of Science and Technology Merit 과학기술훈장
- Type: Order of merit
- Country: Republic of Korea
- Status: Currently awarded
- President: Lee Jae Myung
- Grades: Changjo; Hyeoksin; Ungbi; Doyak; Jinbo

Precedence
- Next (higher): Order of Saemaeul Service Merit
- Next (lower): National Foundation Merit Medal
- Related: Science and Technology Merit Medal; Order of Industrial Service Merit and Industrial Service Merit Medal (before 2001)

The Order of Science and Technology Merit (Korean: 과학기술훈장; Hanja: 科學技術勳章) is one of the Orders of Merit issued by South Korea. It is awarded to those who have rendered outstanding meritorious services in the interest of improving the science and technology.

This Order is the mostly newly organized order of the Republic of Korea. Before that order was established, Order of Industrial Service Merit had been bestowed to scientists and technologists.

== Classes of Science and Technology Merit ==
The Order of Science and Technology Merit is conferred in five classes:

1. Changjo (Creation) 창조장
2. Hyeoksin (Reformation) 혁신장
3. Ungbi (Great Achievement) 웅비장
4. Doyak (Leap) 도약장
5. Jinbo (Progress) 진보장

=== Other Orders of Merit ===
There are three kinds of decoration awarded by the Republic of Korea. They are Orders, Medals of Merit, and Service Medals.
