= Order of Saemaeul Service Merit =

Order of Saemaeul Service Merit 새마을훈장
- Type: Order of merit
- Country: Republic of Korea
- Status: Currently awarded
- President: President Lee Jae Myung
- Grades: Jarip Medal; Jajo Medal; Hyeopdong Medal; Geunmyeon Medal; Noryeok Medal

Precedence
- Next (higher): Order of Industrial Service Merit
- Next (lower): Order of Cultural Merit
- Related: Saemaeul Service Medal

The Order of Saemaeul Service Merit (Hangul: 새마을훈장, Hanja: 새마을勳章) is an order of merit of South Korea (the Republic of Korea). It is presented to individuals who contributed to the social development of the country through the New Community Movement.

== Grades ==
The Order of Saemaeul Service Merit is divided into five classes. The grades are as follows:

1. Jarip Medal: 자립장 (自立章)
2. Jajo Medal: 자조장 (自助章)
3. Hyeopdong Medal: 협동장 (協同章)
4. Geunmyeon Medal: 근면장 (勤勉章)
5. Noryeok Medal: 노력장 (努力章)

Ribbons of the order
Jarip Medal	Jajo Medal	Hyeopdong Medal	Geunmyeon Medal	Noryeok Medal

== Notable recipients ==
- Kim Yong-ki
