= Order of Sport Merit =

South Korean order

Order of Sport Merit 체육훈장

Awarded by President of South Korea or Minister of Culture, Sports and Tourism
- Type: State order of merit
- Established: 1973
- Country: South Korea
- Criteria: Contributions to the development of South Korean sport
- Status: Currently constituted
- Classes: Cheongnyong; Maengho; Geosang; Baegma; Girin
- Medal ribbon of the Cheongnyong Medal

The Order of Sport Merit (Korean: 체육훈장; Hanja: 體育勳章) is one of South Korea's Orders of Merit. It is awarded to those who have rendered outstanding meritorious services in the interest of improving citizen's physique and national status through sports.

== Classes ==
The Order of Sport Merit is conferred in five classes:

1. Cheongnyong (청룡장, Blue Dragon)
2. Maengho (맹호장, Fierce Tiger)
3. Geosang (거상장, Giant Elephant)
4. Baegma (백마장, White Horse)
5. Girin (기린장, Qilin)

== Criteria ==
South Korean sports players can be awarded the order for their achievements at international competitions. The coaches and administrators including foreigners also can receive the order, irrespective of the criteria.

Criteria by order
Order	Points	Requirement
Cheongnyong Medal	1,500	Include a gold medal at the Olympic Games or World Championships.
Maengho Medal	700	Include a silver medal at the Olympic Games or World Championships, or two gold medals at the Asian Games.
Geosang Medal	400	Include a bronze medal at the Olympic Games or World Championships, or a gold medal at the Asian Games.
Baegma Medal	300	—
Girin Medal	250	—

Points by competition
Competition	Gold medalist	Silver medalist	Bronze medalist
Olympic Games	800	540	320
Quadrennial World Championships	400	270	160
Triennial World Championships	350	240	140
Biennial World Championships; Asian Games	200	135	80
Annual World Championships (Note: Only recognises the best result if numerous championships are held in a year.)	150	100	60
World University Games	100	70	40
Asian Championships; World Games; Military World Games; Asian Indoor and Martial Arts Games	50	35	20

Points by record or competition in climbing
Record	Climber	Expedition leader	Member
Ascent of all 14 eight-thousanders	1,500	—	—
Ascent of the Seven Summits; Ascent of the Three Poles	200	—	—
Ascent of an eight-thousander via a new route	200	135	80
Ascent of a seven-thousander via a new route	100	70	40
Ascent of a six-thousander via a new route; Ascent of an eight-thousander	50	35	20
Competition	Gold medalist	Silver medalist	Bronze medalist
IFSC Climbing World Championships; IFSC Climbing World Cup (overall)	200	135	80
IFSC Climbing Asian Championships	20	15	10

== Recipients of the Cheongnyong Medal ==
=== Players ===
==== 2009 ====
- Hwang Kyung-seon (taekwondo practitioner): Middleweight champion at the 2008 and 2012 Summer Olympics, and Welterweight champion at two World Taekwondo Championships.
- Jang Mi-ran (weightlifter): Super Heavyweight champion at the 2008 Summer Olympics.
- Lee Bong-ju (athlete): Champion at the 2001 Boston Marathon.

==== 2016 ====
- Byun Chun-sa (short track speed skater): One of 3000 metre relay champions at the 2006 Winter Olympics.
- Cho Ha-ri (short track speed skater): Overall champion at the 2011 World Short Track Speed Skating Championships, and one of 3000 metre relay champions at the 2014 Winter Olympics.
- Jin Sun-yu (short track speed skater): Holder of three titles at the 2006 Winter Olympics, and overall champion at three World Short Track Speed Skating Championships.
- Kim Ae-kyung (soft tennis player)
- Kim Chang-ho (mountaineer): Fastest climber in the world to summit all 14 eight-thousanders without supplementary oxygen.
- Kim Jae-soo (mountaineer): Climber to summit all 14 eight-thousanders.
- Kim Jung-hwan (fencer): One of team sabre champions at the 2012 and 2020 Summer Olympics.
- Kim Min-jung (short track speed skater): Holder of three 3000 metre relay titles at the World Short Track Speed Skating Championships.
- Kim Yuna (figure skater): Singles champion at the 2010 Winter Olympics and two World Figure Skating Championships.
- Won Woo-young (fencer): Individual sabre champion at the 2010 World Fencing Championships, and one of team sabre champions at the 2012 Summer Olympics.

==== 2017 ====
- Joo Ok (soft tennis player)
- Ki Bo-bae (archer): Individual champion at the 2012 Summer Olympics and the 2015 World Archery Championships.
- Kim Dong-hoon (soft tennis player)
- Lee Ho-suk (short track speed skater): Overall champion at two World Short Track Speed Skating Championships, and one of 5000 metre relay champions at the 2006 Winter Olympics.

==== 2018 ====
- Hong Seong-hwan (sport shooter): 25 metre standard pistol champion at the 2010 ISSF World Shooting Championships.
- Lee Dae-hoon (taekwondo practitioner): Bantamweight champion at two World Taekwondo Championships, and Featherweight champion at the 2017 World Taekwondo Championships.
- Lee Dae-myung (sport shooter): One of 50 metre pistol team champions at the 2018 ISSF World Shooting Championships.

==== 2019 ====
- Gu Bon-gil (fencer): One of team sabre champions at the 2012, 2020 and 2024 Summer Olympics, and four World Fencing Championships.
- Jang Dae-kyu (sport shooter): One of 25 meter center-fire pistol team champions at the 2018 ISSF World Shooting Championships.
- Kim Ji-yeon (fencer): Individual sabre champion at the 2012 Summer Olympics.
- Lee Kwan-ho (finswimmer)
- Oh Jin-hyek (archer): Individual champion at the 2012 Summer Olympics.

==== 2020 ====
- Kim Hee-soo (soft tennis player)
- Kim Mi-gon (mountaineer): Climber to summit all 14 eight-thousanders.
- Park Seung-hi (short track speed skater): Holder of two titles at the 2014 Winter Olympics, and overall champion at the 2010 World Short Track Speed Skating Championships.

==== 2021 ====
- Kim Jain (competition climber): Combined champion at the 2012 IFSC Climbing World Championships.

==== 2022 ====
- Han Seung-hoon (archer): One of team event champions at two World Archery Championships.
- Kim A-lang (short track speed skater): One of 3000 metre relay champions at the 2014 and 2018 Summer Olympics, and four World Short Track Speed Skating Championships.
- Kim Woo-jin (archer): Holder of three titles at the 2024 Summer Olympics, and individual champion at three World Archery Championships.
- Park Kyu-cheol (soft tennis player)
- Seol Ki-kwan (bodybuilder)
- Son Heung-min (footballer): Did not satisfy the criteria, but was specially awarded for winning the Golden Boot at the 2021–22 Premier League.

==== 2023 ====
- Kim Jin-woong (soft tennis player)
- Kim Ji-yeon (soft tennis player)
- Oh Hye-ri (taekwondo practitioner): Middleweight champion at the 2016 Summer Olympics and the 2015 World Taekwondo Championships.

==== 2024 ====
- Chang Hye-jin (archer): Holder of two titles at the 2016 Summer Olympics.
- Kim Hyeon-woo (wrestler): Greco-Roman Lightweight champion at the 2012 Summer Olympics, and Greco-Roman Welterweight champion at the 2013 World Wrestling Championships.
- Kim Jun-ho (fencer): One of team sabre champions at the 2020 Summer Olympics and four World Fencing Championships.
- Kim Seo-jun (sport shooter): 25 meter rapid fire pistol champion at the 2014 ISSF World Shooting Championships.

==== 2026 ====
- Lee Sang-hyeok (League of Legends player): One of team event champions at the 2022 Asian Games, and six League of Legends World Championships with the organization T1.

==== Parasports ====
- Choi Il-sang (table tennis player): One of Teams C4–5 champions at the 2016 Summer Paralympics.
- Choi Ye-jin (boccia player): Individual BC3 champion at the 2012 Summer Paralympics.
- Jung Young-a (table tennis player)
- Kim Jung-gil (table tennis player): One of Teams C4–5 champions at the 2016 Summer Paralympics.
- Kim Kwang-jin (table tennis player): Singles TT5 champion at the 1988 Summer Paralympics.
- Kwak Young-sook (lawn bowler)
- Lee Chang-ho (table tennis player): Holder of two titles at the 2014 World Para Table Tennis Championships.
- Lee Seon-ae (badminton player)
- Min Byeong-eon (swimmer): 50 metre backstroke S3 champion at the 2012 Summer Paralympics.
- Roh Yong-hwa (lawn bowler)

=== Administrators ===
- Prince Philip, Duke of Edinburgh (administrator): President of the International Federation for Equestrian Sports.
- Guus Hiddink (football coach): Contributor to South Korea's fourth place finish at the 2002 FIFA World Cup.
- Thomas Bach (administrator): IOC president.
- Song Dae-nam (judo coach): Middleweight champion at the 2012 Summer Olympics, and contributor to South Korean judo.
- Suh Yun-bok (athletics coach): Champion at the 1947 Boston Marathon, and contributor to South Korean athletics.
- Rhee Jhoon-goo (taekwondo coach): Pioneer of American taekwondo.
- Ham Kee-yong (athletics administrator): Champion at the 1950 Boston Marathon, and contributor to South Korean athletics.
