= Kwak Sang-eon =

South Korean politician

- 곽상언
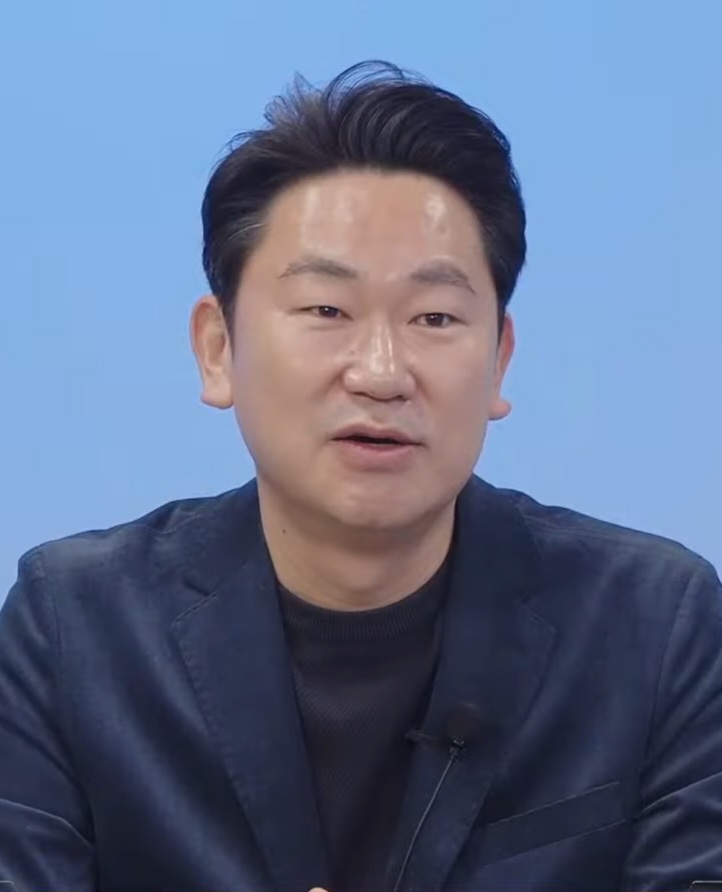

Member of the National Assembly
- Incumbent
- Assumed office 30 May 2024
- Preceded by: Choi Jae-hyung
- Constituency: Seoul Jongno

Personal details
- Born: 18 November 1971 (age 54) Seoul, South Korea
- Party: Democratic (2020–Present)
- Spouse: Roh Jeong-yeon
- Relatives: Roh Moo-hyun (father-in-law); Kwon Yang-sook (mother-in-law); Roh Geon-ho (brother-in-law)
- Education: Seoul National University

Korean name
- Hangul: 곽상언
- Hanja: 郭相彦
- RR: Gwak Sangeon
- MR: Kwak Sangŏn

Kwak Sang-eon (Korean: 곽상언, born 18 November 1971) is a South Korean politician and lawyer serving as a member of the National Assembly. He is known as the son-in-law of former President Roh Moo Hyun and First Lady Kwon Yang Sook.

Kwak worked as a lawyer after passing the bar exam in 2001. He was very interested in public interest litigation activities, such as his lawsuit against Korea Electric Power Corporation from 2012 to 2023.

He announced his entry into politics in August 2019 and was defeated in the 2020 general election, but gained political experience while serving as vice president of the Democratic Party of Korea's Democratic Research Institute. In April 2024, he was elected to the National Assembly, defeating the People Power Party's candidate Choi Jae-hyung in the Jongno, often described as "No. 1 district of politics."

== Personal background ==
Kwak was born in Seoul on 18 November 1971. He passed the bar exam in 2001, completed a three-year course at the Judicial Research and Training Institute, and worked as an attorney at the Yoon & Yang law firm since January 2004. He married Roh Jeong-yeon, the daughter of President-elect Roh Moo-hyun, in February 2003, and had a daughter in August 2004.

After training in the United States around 2005, Kwak returned to Korea and opened a private law office. In 2009, he was investigated by the prosecution along with the Roh Moo-hyun family. After former president Roh died in May of that year, he did not appear in the media for a while.

== Lawyer activity ==
=== Litigation against Korea Electric Power Corporation ===
Kwak filed a class action lawsuit against Korea Electric Power Corporation in 2014, pointing out the unfairness of the residential electricity rate system. At that time, controversy was heating up as the 11.7 times progressive rate system was applied only to residential electricity. Participants in the lawsuit requested a refund of 1 million won per person, taking issue with the fact that consumers do not have the opportunity to review the terms and conditions when paying electricity bills and that KEPCO is causing losses by selling industrial electricity too cheaply.

== Political career ==
Kwak joined the Democratic Party of Korea in January 2020. He competed with Seong Nak-hyeon, former president of the Korea Self-Reliance Center Association, to run for the Boeun·Okcheon·Yeongdong·Goesan constituency in North Chungcheong Province. After winning the primary, Kwak ran against candidate Park Deok-heum of the United Future Party, but lost with 41.44% of the votes.

He ran for the Jongno constituency in the 2024 election, and was elected to the National Assembly after defeating People Power Party candidate Choi Jae-hyung in his second attempt.

== Election results ==
Year	Elections	Constituency	Party affiliation	Votes (%)	Results
2020	21st National Assembly General Election	Boeun–Okcheon–Yeongdong–Goesan (North Chungcheong)	Democratic	42,613 (41.44%)	Defeated (2nd)
2024	22nd National Assembly General Election	Jongno (Seoul)	Democratic	44,713 (50.92%)	Won

== Authored Books ==
- Kwak, Sang-eon (5 January 2024). 곽상언의 시선 [Perspective of Kwak Sang-eon] (in Korean). Seoul: Medici Media. ISBN 979-11-5706-331-4.

National Assembly of the Republic of Korea
Preceded by Choi Jae-hyung	Member of the National Assembly for Jongno (Seoul); 30 May 2024–present	Incumbent
