= Lee Cheon-gong =

South Korean spiritual leader and YouTuber (born 1952)

- 이천공
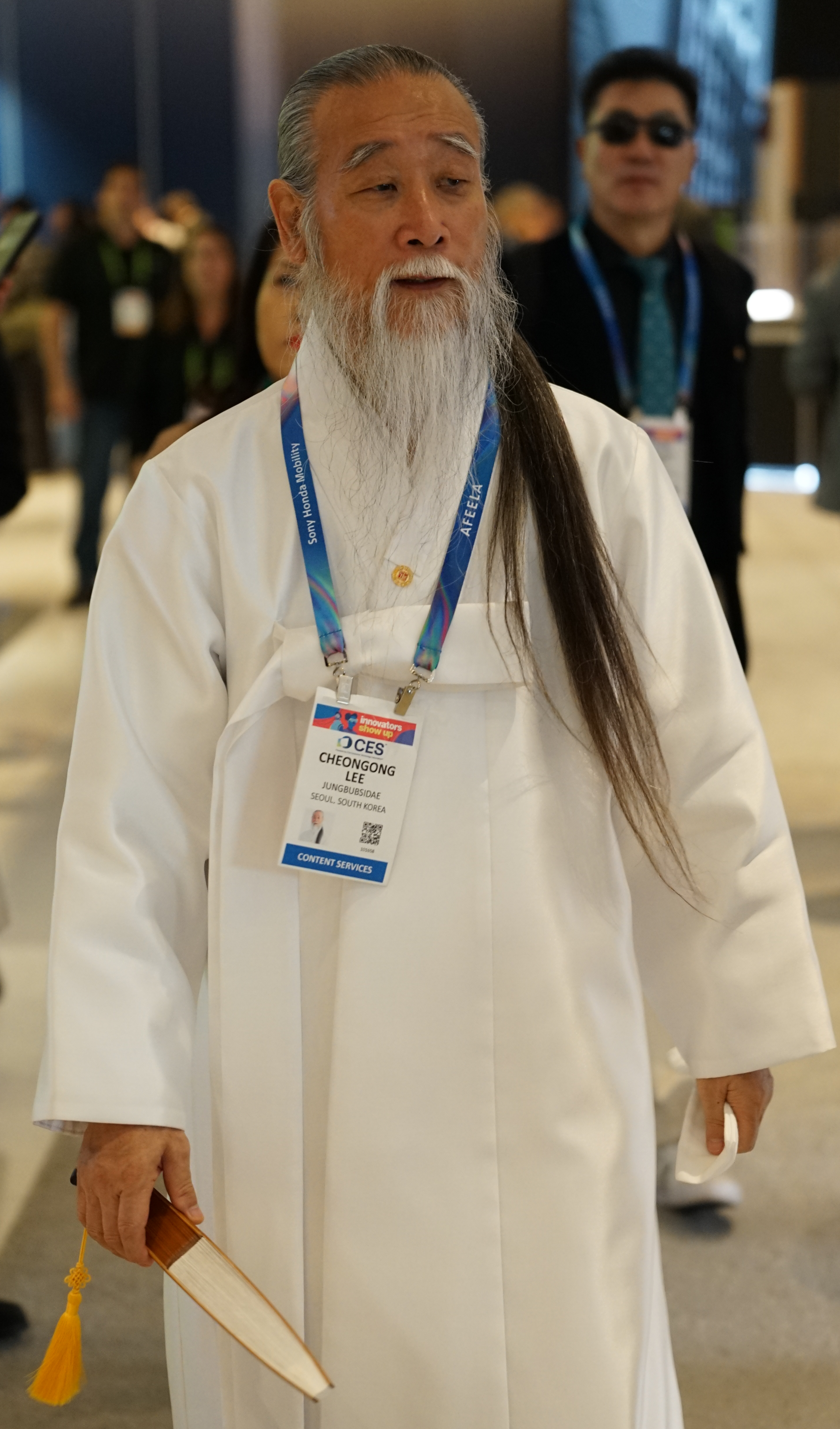
- Lee at CES 2026
- Born: Lee Byeong-cheol; February 15, 1952 (age 74); Daegu, South Korea
- Occupations: Spiritual mentor, YouTuber, author
- Known for: Jungbeop Era (Jungbeop Segye)
- Title: Master Cheongong

Korean name
- Hangul: 이천공
- RR: I Cheongong
- MR: I Ch'ŏn'gong

Lee Cheon-gong (Korean: 이천공; born February 15, 1952), professionally known as Cheongong (천공), is a South Korean spiritual mentor, author, and YouTuber. He is the founder of the "Jungbeop" (Grand Law) movement and has gained significant media attention due to his ties to high-ranking political figures in South Korea.

== Early life ==
Cheongong was born in Daegu in 1952. He spent 17 years practicing asceticism and meditation before beginning his career as a social and spiritual mentor.

== Political controversies ==
Cheongong has been at the center of several political controversies involving the administration of Yoon Suk Yeol.

- Presidential Mentorship: During the 2022 presidential campaign, allegations surfaced that Cheongong acted as a "shamanic" mentor to Yoon and his wife, Kim Keon-hee. Cheongong has stated in interviews that he provided general advice but denied being a political strategist.
- Residence Relocation: In 2023, South Korean police investigated claims that Cheongong visited the official residence of the Army Chief of Staff to consult on the relocation of the presidential office to Yongsan District. The presidential office filed libel suits against individuals spreading these claims, and police later stated that a different feng shui expert had visited the site instead.
- Medical School Quotas: In 2024, rumors circulated that the government's decision to increase medical school quotas by 2,000 was influenced by Cheongong (linking the number 2,000 to his legal name "Icheon-gong"). Cheongong publicly refuted these claims as "ignorant."
