= Bongha Village =

Town in southeastern South Korea

- Location within South Korea
- Coordinates: 35°18′51″N 128°46′10.4″E
- Country: South Korea
- Province: South Gyeongsang Province

Korean name
- Hangul: 봉하마을
- Hanja: 烽下마을
- RR: Bongha maeul
- MR: Pongha maŭl

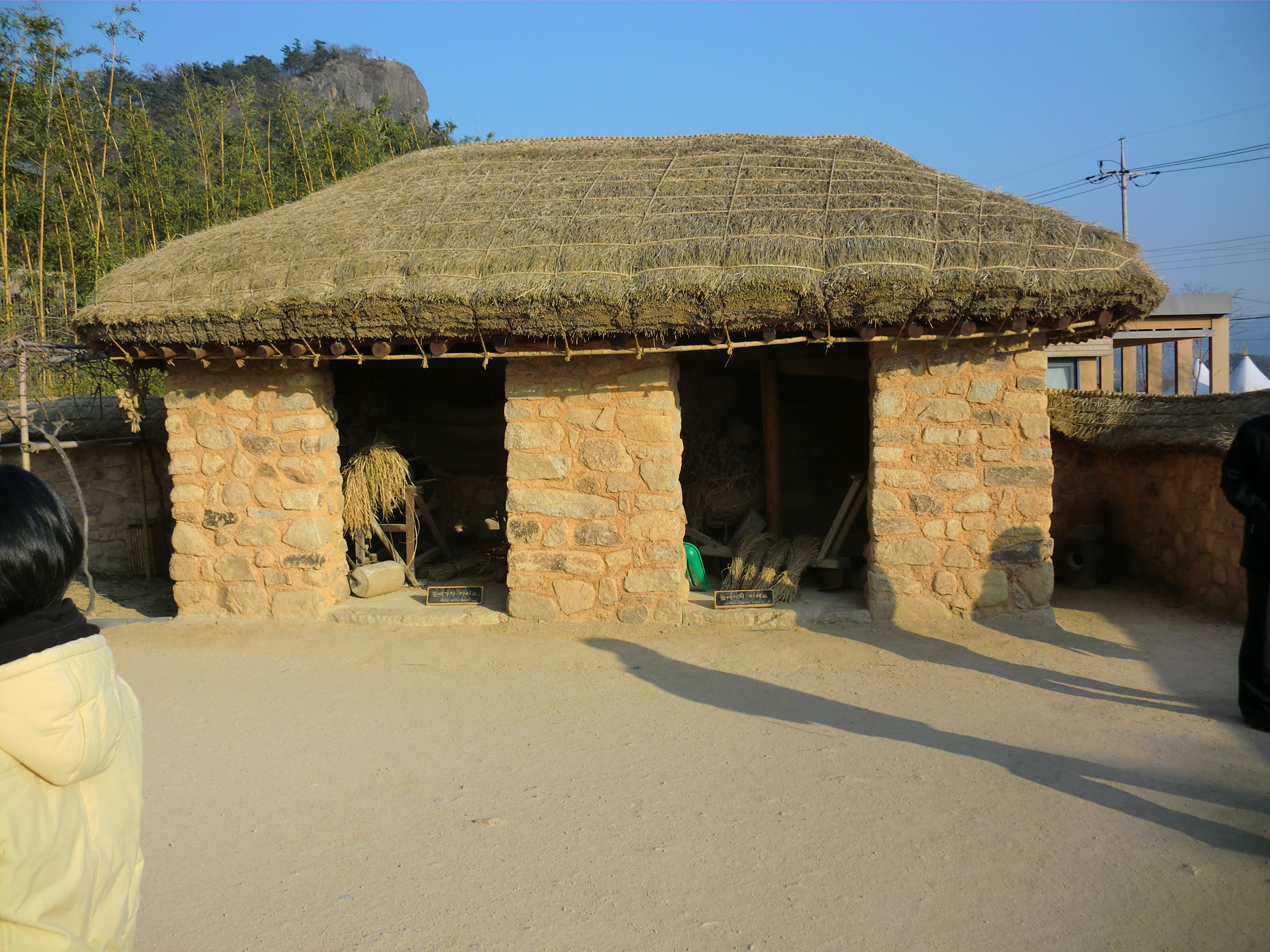
Roh Moo-hyun's birthplace in Bongha

Bongha Village (Korean: 봉하마을) is a town in South Gyeongsang Province, South Korea. It is located near Gimhae and Busan, in southeastern South Korea. Bongha Village is notable for being the hometown of former President of South Korea Roh Moo-hyun, who committed suicide there on May 23, 2009.
