= Francesca Donner =

First Lady of South Korea from 1948 to 1960

- 프란체스카 도너
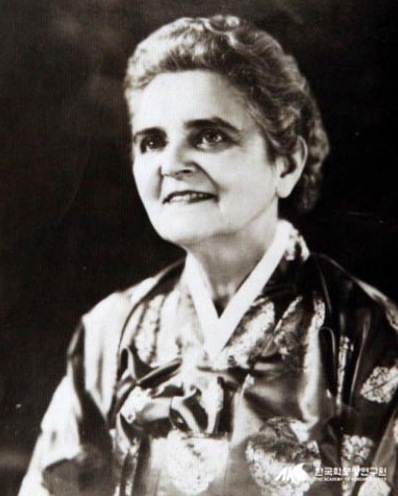

First Lady of South Korea
- In role 24 July 1948 – 26 April 1960
- President: Syngman Rhee
- Preceded by: Position established
- Succeeded by: Gong Deok-gwi

Personal details
- Born: Franziska Donner; June 15, 1900 Inzersdorf bei Wien, Austria-Hungary
- Died: March 19, 1992 (aged 91) Seoul, South Korea
- Resting place: Seoul National Cemetery
- Spouse: Syngman Rhee (m. 1934; died 1965)

Korean name
- Hangul: 이부란
- Hanja: 李富蘭
- RR: I Buran
- MR: I Puran

Francesca Maria Barbara Donner (Korean: 프란체스카 도너, born Franziska Donner; June 15, 1900 – March 19, 1992) was the inaugural First Lady of South Korea, from 1948 to 1960, as the second wife of Syngman Rhee, the first president of South Korea.

== Early life and education ==
According to birth documents, she was born Franziska Donner. She later used the spelling Franzeska Donner (even in official documents). Otherwise, the most common spelling of her name was the Italian form, Francesca. This version is used in all of her South Korean documents (including her passport).

Donner was born in the municipality of Inzersdorf, a suburb of the capital Vienna which was incorporated into the City of Vienna, into the family of a soda water industrialist. She was the daughter of Franziska (Gerhartl) and Rudolf Donner. She graduated with a Ph.D. in languages from the University of Vienna, before working at the League of Nations in Geneva as an interpreter and lower-level diplomat. In 1933, she met Korean politician Syngman Rhee in a Geneva hotel. At the time Rhee was living in the United States and was on a visit in Geneva. He visited Donner shortly afterwards in Austria and asked to marry her. Donner followed him to the United States and the marriage took place in 1934 in New York. For both, it was their second marriage.

== Career ==
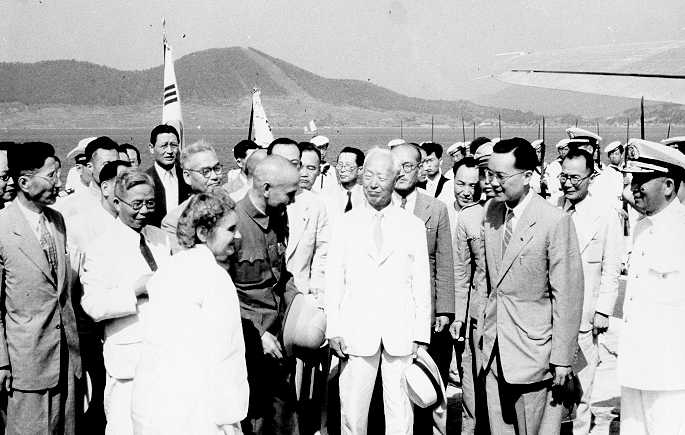
Donner with Rhee and Chiang Kai-shek

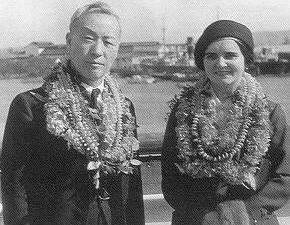
Donner with Syngman Rhee in 1933

Donner and Rhee lived initially in New York and Washington, D.C., and then in Hawaii, where a large Korean expatriate community-in-exile was politically active. Donner worked in the U.S. as Rhee's secretary, particularly in the preparation of the book Japan Inside Out (1940).

After the defeat of Japan in World War II, Rhee returned to Korea in October 1945 with the support of the U.S. government and Donner followed him there a few months later.

In March 1948, Rhee was elected first president of South Korea, an office he held until 1960. "Francesca Rhee" was from 1948 to 1960 the first First Lady of South Korea. She appeared at her husband's side in almost all public functions.

When the Rhees were forced into exile in 1960, they settled in Hawaii. Donner cared for her husband after he suffered a stroke and until his death on July 19, 1965. She then returned to Austria.

== Later life and death ==
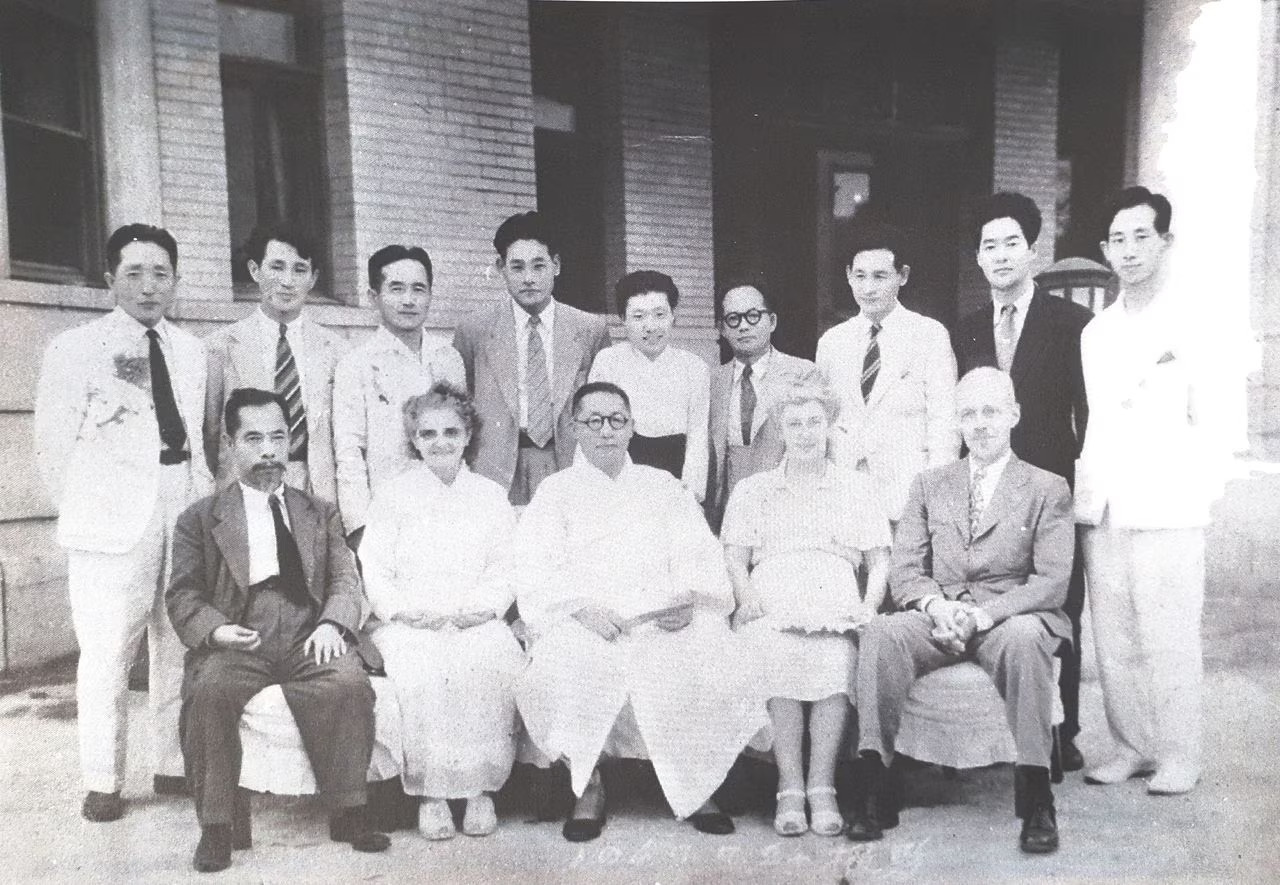
Donner in a group photo, 1946

After five years of residence in Austria, which she had left more than 30 years earlier, Donner returned to South Korea in 1970. She lived from 1970 to 1992 in Seoul, specifically in the Ihwajang, the former home of President Rhee, together with their adopted son, Rhee In-soo and his family.

Donner died on March 19, 1992, in Seoul. Her last wish was to be buried alongside her husband in Seoul, with the Korean flag and a scroll written in calligraphy by her husband that read "reunification of Korea".

== See also ==
- First Lady of South Korea

Honorary titles
First	First Lady of South Korea; 1948–1960	Succeeded by Baik Gui-ran (Acting)
