= Nosamo =

South Korean political fan club

Nosamo (Korean: 노사모; acronym for 노무현을 사랑하는 사람들의 모임 "gathering of people who love Roh Moo-hyun") is an internet-based group organised in 2000 as a fan club for the South Korean politician and former president Roh Moo-hyun.

== Activity ==
The group of Roh Moo-hyun supporters organized after a continuous streak of his defeats; particularly, after he ran for the National Assembly as opposition to regionalism in politics. Nosamo was formed by a few netizens at a PC bang (internet cafes of South Korea) in Daejeon, but soon counted celebrities and prominent political figures among its growing number of members. In 2002, the group came into national prominence as an active force behind Roh's run for the presidency against the more established political figure of Lee Hoi-chang. As the more conservative candidate, Lee drew more support among the older generation, while most of Roh's support came from the younger generation. Nosamo is widely credited with mobilising the younger voters in the election; its efforts included a mobile-phone campaign on election day to urge young voters to cast their ballots.

After Roh's victory in the election, Nosamo remained an important source of political support for the president, particularly in 2004 when the South Korean parliament voted to impeach him for illegal electioneering and incompetence; Nosamo members organised a candlelight vigil in protest.

== Controversy ==
Because Nosamo as an internet-based political organisation has very little precedent in South Korea or elsewhere, it has attracted a fair amount of criticism. Some have questioned whether some of Nosamo's campaign strategies broke election laws, and the selection of prominent Nosamo members as Roh's close aides has invited charges of favouritism. Notably, some of these aides were involved in corruption scandals. As of 2005, Nosamo had lost some of its political momentum as Roh's presidency saw a dip in popularity among his core supporters due to his labour policies and the deployment of troops to support the US in the Iraq War.

== See also ==
- South Korean Presidential Election, 2002
- Politics of South Korea
