= Kim Jung-sook =

First Lady of South Korea from 2017 to 2022

- 김정숙
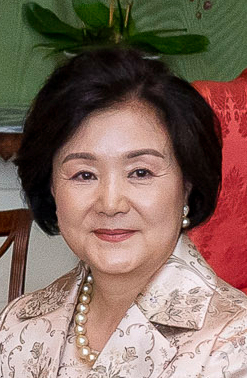

First Lady of South Korea
- In role 10 May 2017 – 9 May 2022
- President: Moon Jae-in
- Preceded by: Choi Ji-young (acting)
- Succeeded by: Kim Keon Hee

Personal details
- Born: 15 November 1954 (age 71) Seoul, South Korea
- Party: Democratic
- Spouse: Moon Jae-in (m. 1981)
- Children: 2
- Education: Kyung Hee University
- Religion: Roman Catholicism; Protestant Christian (former)

Korean name
- Hangul: 김정숙
- Hanja: 金正淑
- RR: Gim Jeongsuk
- MR: Kim Chŏngsuk

Kim Jung-sook (Korean: 김정숙; born 15 November 1954) is a South Korean classical singer who served as the first lady of South Korea from 2017 to 2022, as the wife of Moon Jae-in, the 12th president of South Korea.

== Early life and education ==
Kim's parents ran a hanbok shop at Gwangjang market in Seoul, but later moved to Ganghwa Island. She graduated from the Sookmyung Girls' Middle and High School. Kim also holds a Bachelor of Arts in vocal music at Kyung Hee University. She was a member of the Seoul Metropolitan Chorus from 1978 to 1982.

Kim met her future husband, Moon, during their university years at Kyung Hee University. Their relationship began to develop after she took care of Moon when he had been knocked out by tear gas during a protest against president Park Chung Hee. Moon and Kim married in 1981 when Moon was studying at the Judicial Research and Training Institute, after Kim proposed marriage to Moon in an act that was virtually unheard of in South Korea.

== First Lady of South Korea ==
Characterized by her "easy-going" personality, Kim has been given the nickname "Jolly Lady", widely popularised during Moon's presidential campaign in 2017.

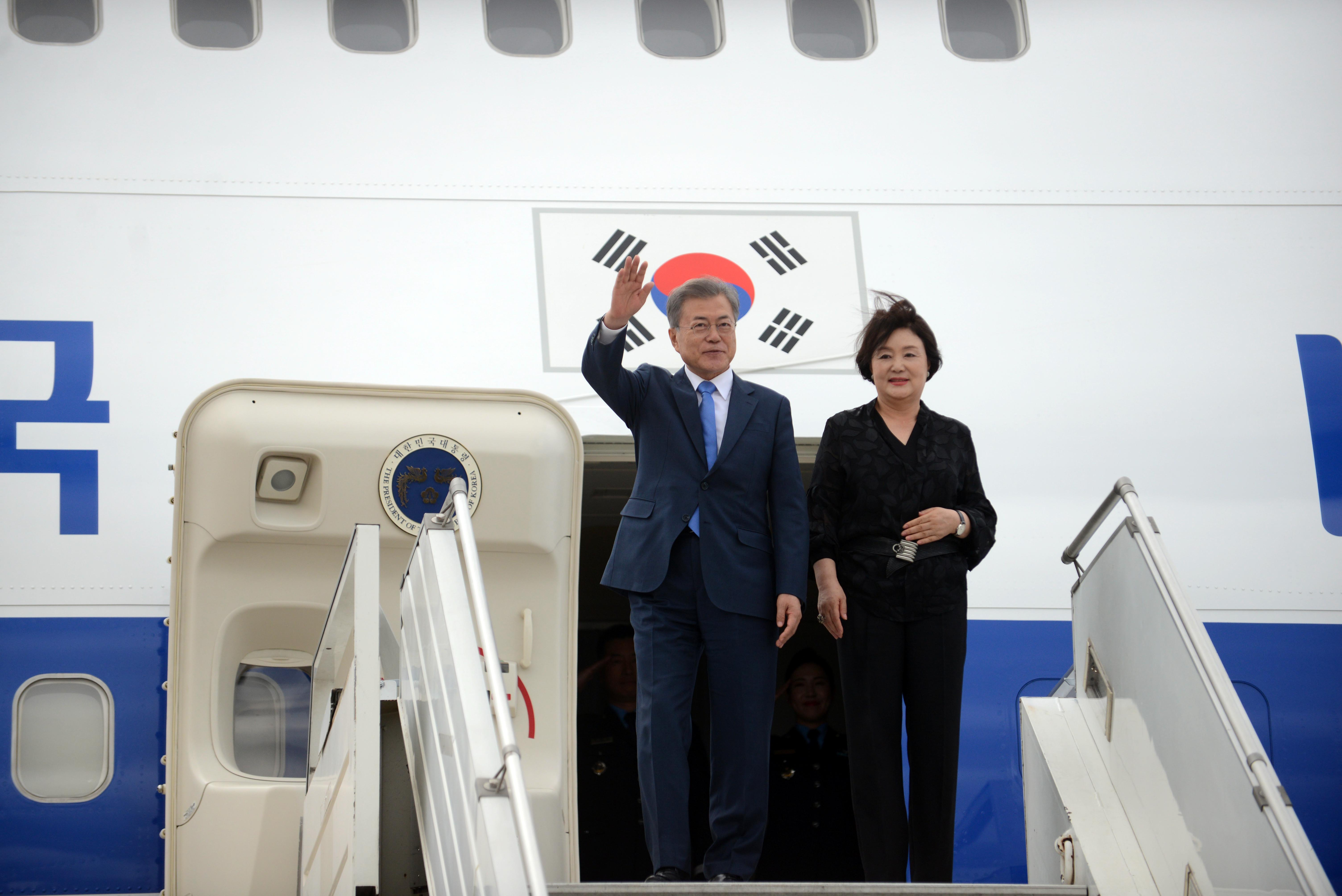
Moon Jae-in and Kim Jung-sook in 2018

Kim became First Lady of the Republic of Korea on her husband's inauguration as president on 10 May 2017. As first lady, she focused on members of minority groups such as people with disabilities, single-parent families and elderly people by hosting related events arranged by the presidential office, Blue House. She also made commemorative speeches for cultural events and visited related facilities when accompanying her husband's official or state visit to foreign countries.

Kim has been accused of abusing public funds for personal clothing and accessories. People in the conservative right wing gathered photos of Kim at domestic and international public events to examine the number, brands, and prices of her apparel and accessories. Their quantity and high price caused some to demand the Blue House (Cheong Wa Dae; the then-presidential office) reveal the payment sources. The Korea Taxpayers Association (KTA) filed two lawsuits against the Blue House, once in 2019 and again in February 2022. The Seoul Administrative Court ruled that the presidential office must disclose the prices of clothing Kim wore at official events. The Blue House, not complying with the ruling, insisted that the payment information was pertaining to national security would remain classified for at least 15 years. It was added that Kim paid for her clothing with her own money.

In 2025, prosecutors withdrew cases filed against Kim over a solo trip she made to the Taj Mahal that was reported to have cost 400 million won ($276,336) in state funds while she was first lady in 2018, and for keeping a loaned Chanel jacket that was used during a state visit in France that same year, citing lack of evidence.

=== Pets ===
While at the Blue House, Kim and Moon lived with adopted dogs and cats from their hometown of Yangsan. Among those, a Pungsan dog Maru (마루) and a cat Jjingjjing (찡찡; also called Jjingjjingi; 찡찡이). They also had a dog named Tori (토리; a mixed-breed), who was adopted from an animal shelter in contrast with other "First Dogs" who have traditionally been purebred Jindo dogs. They also received pair of Pungsan dogs, male Songgang (송강) and female Gomi (곰이), from Pyongyang as a gift shortly after the Inter-Korean Summit in September 2018. Gomi later gave birth to six puppies, Sani (산이), Deuri (들이), Gangi (강이), Byeori (별이), Dari (달이), and Haennim (햇님) named after Korean words for parts of nature - a mountain, grass field, a river, a star, the Moon and the Sun. On August 30, 2019, the six puppies were sent to Seoul, Incheon, Daejeon and Gwangju, leaving their parents at the Blue House.

== Honours ==
=== National honours ===
- South Korea: Recipient of the Grand Order of Mugunghwa (3 May 2022) President Moon Jae-in self-awarded himself and his wife, Kim, with the highest order awarded by the government of Korea.

=== Foreign honours ===
- Austria: Grand Decoration of Honour in Gold with Sash of the Decoration of Honour for Services to the Republic of Austria (14 June 2021)
- Norway: Grand Cross of the Royal Norwegian Order of Merit (12 June 2019)
- Spain: Dame Grand Cross of the Order of Civil Merit (8 June 2021)
- Sweden: Commander Grand Cross of the Royal Order of the Polar Star (14 June 2019)

Honorary titles
Preceded by Kim Yoon-ok	First Lady of South Korea; 2017–2022	Succeeded by Kim Keon Hee
