= Choi Jae-hyung =

South Korean jurist and politician

The Honourable Choi Jae-hyung MP
- 최재형
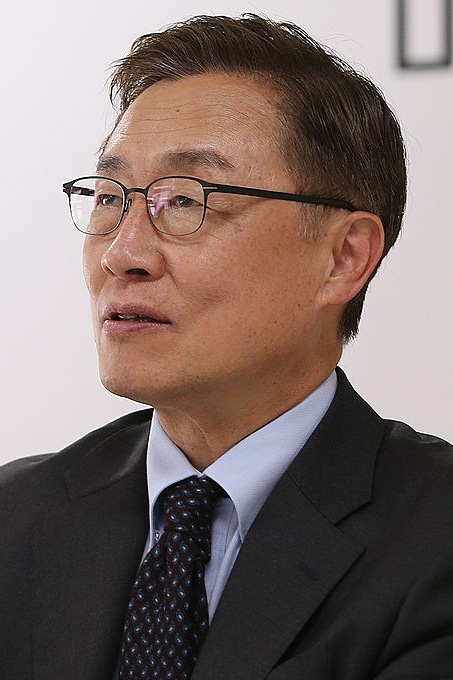

Member of the National Assembly
- In office 10 March 2022 – 29 May 2024
- Preceded by: Lee Nak-yon
- Succeeded by: Kwak Sang-eon
- Constituency: Seoul Jongno

Chairman of the Board of Audit and Inspection
- In office 2 January 2018 – 28 June 2021
- President: Moon Jae-in
- Preceded by: Hwang Chan-hyun
- Succeeded by: Kang Mina (acting)

Personal details
- Born: 2 September 1956 (age 70) Changwon Jinhae South Gyeongsang, South Korea
- Party: People Power
- Spouse: Lee So-yeon
- Children: Choi Ji-won; Choi Ye-won; Choi Young-jin (adopted); Choi Jin-ho (adopted)
- Parent(s): Choi Young-sup (father; d. 2021); Chung Ohk-kyung (mother; d. 2009)
- Relatives: Choi Byung-kyu (grandfather)
- Education: Seoul National University
- Occupation: Politician, judge

- Choi Jae-hyung
- Hangul: 최재형
- Hanja: 崔在亨
- RR: Choe Jaehyeong
- MR: Ch'oe Chaehyŏng

Choi Jae-hyung (Korean: 최재형, born 2 September 1956) is a South Korean politician and retired judge who served as the Chairman of the Board of Audit and Inspection (BAI) from 2018 to 2021. He is a member of the National Assembly.

== Early life and education ==
Choi Jae-hyung was born in Jinhae (now Jinhae District, Changwon), South Gyeongsang on 2 September 1956. He is the second of the four sons of Choi Young-sup (1928–2021), is a former reserved captain from Pyeonggang, Gangwon (now under the de facto rule of North Korea). He led the victory of South Korea during the Battle of Korea Strait. He also participated in the Battle of Inchon and was awarded the Order of Military Merit for 3 times. He married Chung Ohk-kyung, who died in 2009 after an 11-year battle with Parkinson's disease. He died on 8 July 2021, a day after his son launched a bid to join politics. He is the son of Choi Byung-kyu (1909–2008), a former independent activist who was also from Pyeonggang.

Choi Jae-hyung has an elder brother, Choi Jae-shin, who was the former President of KorDev. He also has 2 younger brothers — Choi Jae-min (doctor at a children's hospital) and Choi Jae-wan (professor at Gwangju University.

Choi spent his childhood with his father in Waryong-dong, Central District, Seoul, but then moved to Hoehyeon-dong, and then Donggyo-dong. He studied at Hanyoung Secondary School in Seongbuk (now moved to Gangdong), which took 4 hours to go from and return to his home. He then attended Kyunggi High School, where he met a friend named Kang Myung-hoon, who suffered from poliomyelitis during that time. Every day, Choi carried Kang on his back to go to school, which was continued for 2 years. This story became a trend when both were qualified for the bar in 1981. Kang later became a lawyer.

He studied law at Seoul National University, and completed national service as a lieutenant from 1983 to 1986.

== Career ==
After being qualified for the bar in 1981, Choi started his career as a judge at Seoul Central District Court in 1986. He then continued to work at Daejeon District Court, Seoul Family Court, Seoul High Court and so on.

=== Chairman of the Board of Audit and Inspection (BAI) ===
Following the election of the new President Moon Jae-in, Choi was nominated Chairman of the Board of Audit and Inspection (BAI) on 7 December 2017, 6 days after the resignation of Hwang Chan-hyun. On 29 December, 231 out of 246 MPs voted in favour of his appointment.

On 28 June 2021, Choi officially resigned as the Chairman of the BAI.

== Political career ==
On 7 July 2021, after 9 days he resigned from the BAI, Choi made an announcement to join politics. It was also reported that the People Power Party (PPP) intends to bring him into the party to pave a way for running at the 2022 presidential election.

On 15 July, Choi officially joined the PPP.

== Personal life ==
Choi is married to Lee So-yeon; the couple has 2 daughters and 2 adopted sons.

He is a Protestant and a presbyter at Shinchon Church, where both of his parents used to be a part of.

== Election results ==
Year	Elections	Constituency	Political party	Votes (%)	Results
2022	March 2022 By-Election	Jongno (Seoul)	PPP	49,637 (52.09%)	Won
2024	22nd National Assembly General Election	Jongno (Seoul)	PPP	38,752 (44.13%)	Defeated (2nd)

National Assembly of the Republic of Korea
Preceded by Lee Nak-yon	Member of the National Assembly from Jongno (Seoul); 10 March 2022–29 May 2024	Succeeded by Kwak Sang-eon
