= Kim Hea Kyung =

First Lady of South Korea since 2025

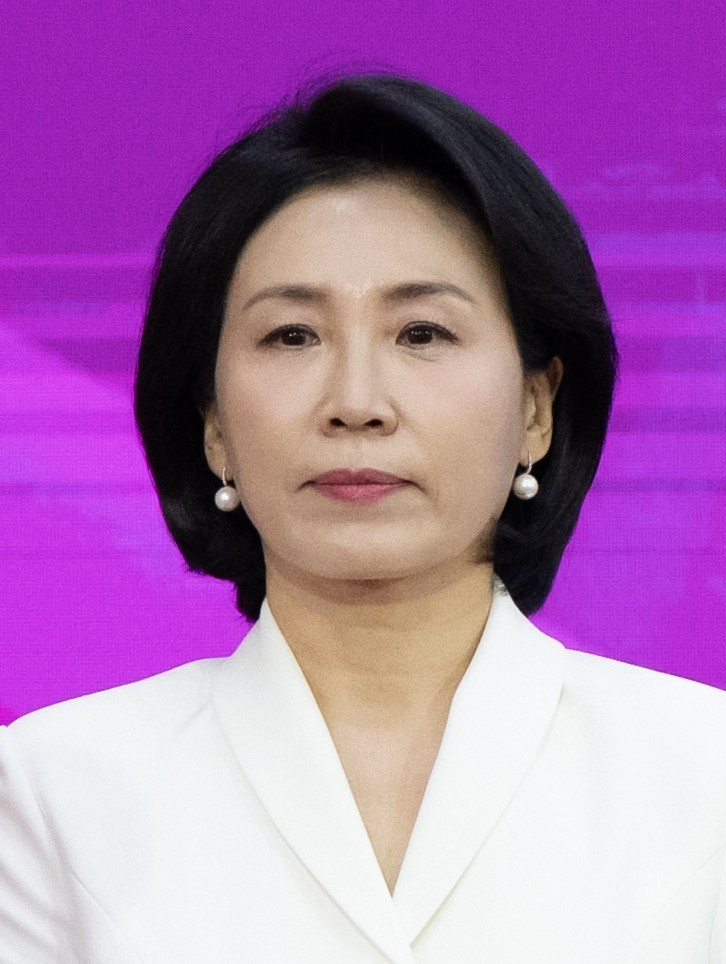
- Kim in 2025

First Lady of South Korea
- Incumbent
- Assumed role 4 June 2025
- President: Lee Jae Myung
- Preceded by: Kim Keon Hee; Choi Ah-young (acting); Choi Jeong-seon (acting); Choi Ah-young (acting); Park Eun-jin (acting)

Personal details
- Born: 12 September 1966 (age 60) Seoul, South Korea
- Spouse: Lee Jae Myung (m. 1991)
- Children: 2
- Education: Sookmyung Women's University (BA)
- Occupation: Pianist

Korean name
- Hangul: 김혜경
- Hanja: 金惠景
- RR: Gim Hyegyeong
- MR: Kim Hyegyŏng

Kim Hea Kyung (Note: Current romanization follows an official government request. Formerly romanized as Kim Hye-kyung or Kim Hye-gyeong.) (Korean: 김혜경; born 12 September 1966) is a South Korean pianist who is the first lady of South Korea since 2025, as the wife of Lee Jae Myung, the 14th president of South Korea.

== Early life and education ==
Kim Hea Kyung was born on 12 September 1966 in Seoul to a middle-class family. She completed her studies at Sunhwa Arts School before pursuing piano studies degree at Sookmyung Women's University.

== Career ==
Kim had intended to pursue graduate studies in Austria while working as a piano instructor. But when she met Lee Jae Myung in August 1990, her plans were altered. She gained public attention by appearing on television programs alongside her husband.

At first, Kim did not want Lee to become involved in politics, but as Lee grew more well-known during his term as mayor of Seongnam, Kim changed her mind and began publicly supporting him. Kim eventually came to believe that "participating in public service with her husband was rewarding," according to Korea JoongAng Daily.

In 2018, she published a cookbook titled Let's Make Meals.

In 2022, she was accused of using a Gyeonggi Province government credit card for her personal expenses. She was fined 1.5 million won by an appellate court, which ruled that her actions constituted a violation of the Public Official Election Act, as they were deemed to have benefited her husband’s campaign. This case has been criticized by many in comparison to other comparable cases, for example, cases regarding Kim Keon Hee. Kim has appealed the conviction to the Supreme Court.

== As First Lady ==
With Lee's election as president on 4 June 2025, Kim became the First Lady of South Korea. As First Lady, she restored the Office of the First Lady, which includes dedicated staff and protocol functions that had been dissolved under the previous administration.

She chose to focus on engaging with religious groups and marginalized communities rather than attending political events. According to a Democratic Party campaign official, her visits were meant to help "promote national unity".

On 27 October 2025, she participated in the "Spouses' Programme" at the 47th ASEAN Summit in Kuala Lumpur as the First Lady of Korea.

== Personal life ==
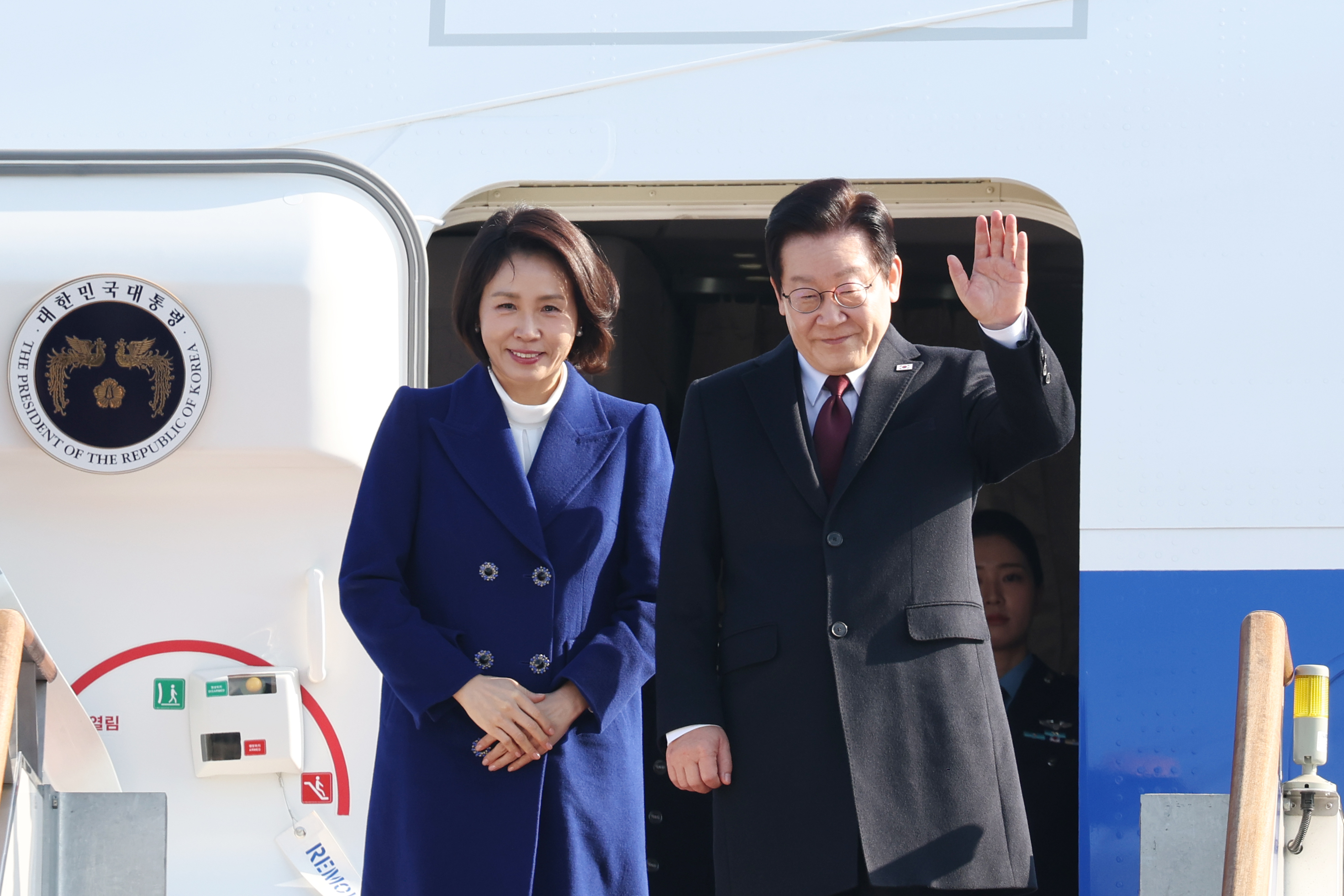
Kim Hea Kyung and Lee Jae Myung in 2026

In 1990, Kim Hea Kyung met Lee Jae Myung through a blind-date event. Kim's first impression of Lee was that he "wasn't handsome and looked older." Lee later said that Kim was the third woman he met out of five blind dates and that he fell in love with her at first sight. On their fourth meeting, Lee proposed to Kim, but she initially refused. After Lee gave her six of his personal diaries, Kim agreed to marry him. The couple wed in March 1991, after seven months of dating. The couple has two sons, Dong-ho (born 1992) and Yoon-ho (born 1993).

In 2025, Kim was diagnosed with otolithiasis.

== Television programs ==
- Same Bed, Different Dreams 2: You Are My Destiny (2017)

== Awards ==
=== National awards ===
- South Korea: Recipient of the Grand Order of Mugunghwa (4 June 2025) (as First Lady of South Korea)

== Notes ==
Honorary titles
Preceded by Kim Keon Hee; Choi Ah-young (Acting); Choi Jeong-seon (Acting); Choi Ah-young (Acting); Park Eun-jin (Acting)	First Lady of South Korea; 2025–present	Incumbent
