= Roh Moo-hyun =

President of South Korea from 2003 to 2008

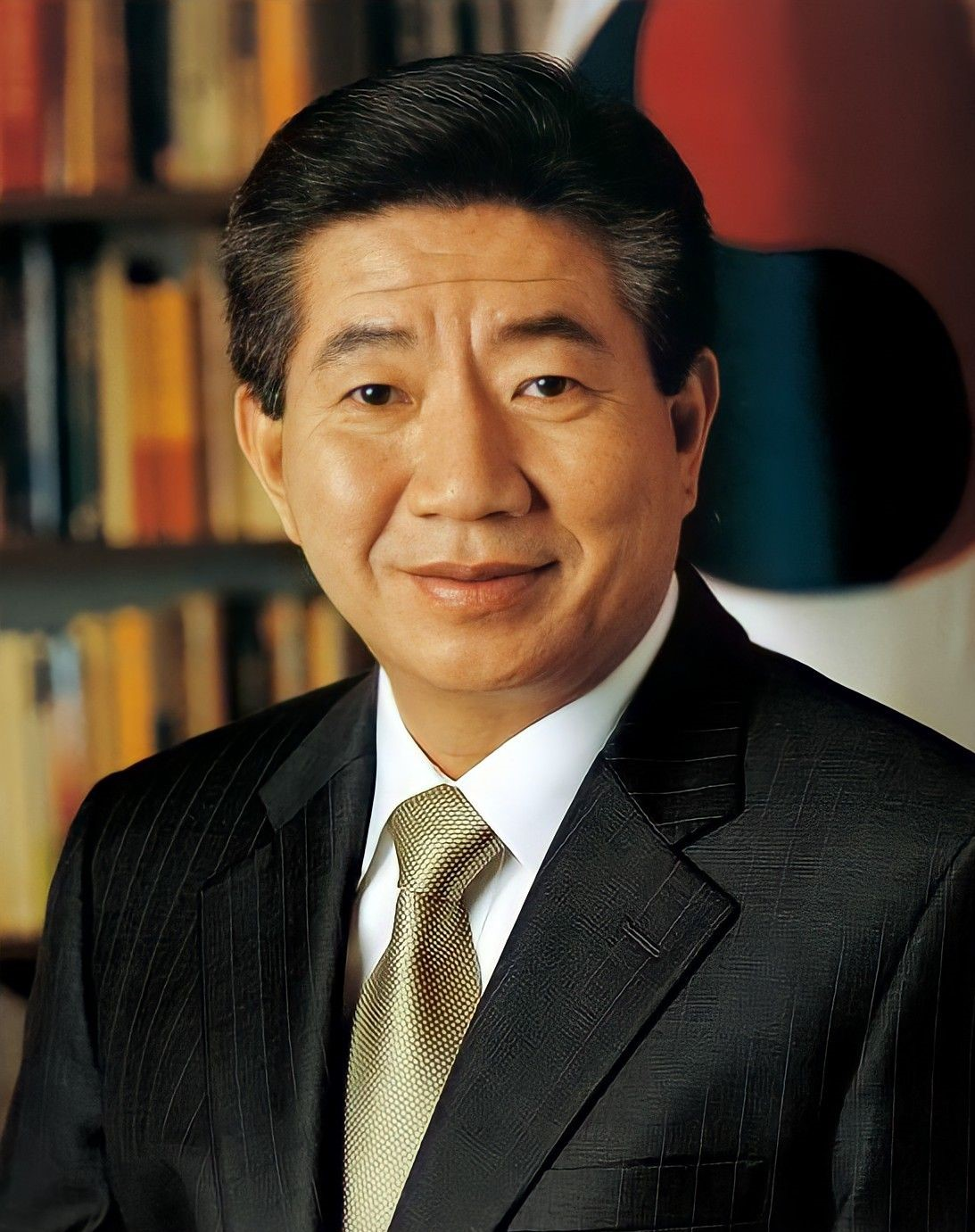
- Official portrait, 2003

9th President of South Korea
- In office 25 February 2003 – 24 February 2008 (Note: Goh Kun served as acting president during Roh's suspension of powers and duties from 12 March to 14 May 2004.)
- Prime Minister: Kim Suk-soo; Goh Kun; Lee Hun-jai (acting); Lee Hae-chan; Han Duck-soo (acting); Han Myeong-sook; Kwon O-kyu (acting); Han Duck-soo
- Preceded by: Kim Dae-jung
- Succeeded by: Lee Myung-bak

Minister of Oceans and Fisheries
- In office 7 August 2000 – 25 March 2001
- President: Kim Dae-jung
- Prime Minister: Lee Han-dong
- Preceded by: Lee Hang-kyu
- Succeeded by: Chung Woo-taik

Member of the National Assembly
- In office 22 July 1998 – 29 May 2000
- Preceded by: Lee Myung-bak
- Succeeded by: Chung In-bong
- Constituency: Jongno (Seoul)
- In office 30 May 1988 – 29 May 1992
- Preceded by: Park Chan-jong; Kim Jung-kil
- Succeeded by: Hur Sam-soo
- Constituency: Dong (Busan)

Personal details
- Born: 1 September 1946 Gimhae, Bongha Village, South Gyeongsang, southern Korea
- Died: 23 May 2009 (aged 62) Gimhae, Bongha Village, South Gyeongsang, South Korea
- Cause of death: Suicide by jumping from height
- Resting place: Bongha Village
- Party: Independent (2007–2009)
- Other political affiliations: List: Reunification Democratic (1988–1990); Independent (1990); Democratic (1990) (1990–1991); Democratic (1991) (1991–1995); United Democratic (1995–1996); Democratic (1995) (1996–1997); Independent; (1997); National Congress (1997–2000); Millennium Democratic (2000–2003); Independent (2003–2004); Uri (2004–2007)
- Spouse: Kwon Yang-sook (m. 1973)
- Relations: Kwak Sang-eon (son-in-law)
- Children: Roh Geon-ho; Roh Jeong-yeon

Military service
- Branch/service: Republic of Korea Army
- Years of service: 1968–1971
- Rank: Corporal

Korean name
- Hangul: 노무현
- Hanja: 盧武鉉
- RR: No Muhyeon
- MR: No Muhyŏn

Roh Moo-hyun GOM (Korean: 노무현, pronounced [no muçʌn]; 1 September 1946 – 23 May 2009) was a South Korean politician and attorney who served as the ninth President of South Korea from 2003 to 2008.

Roh's pre-presidential political career was focused on human rights advocacy for student activists in South Korea. His electoral career later expanded to a focus on overcoming regionalism in South Korean politics, culminating in his election to the presidency. He achieved a large following among younger internet users, which aided his success in the presidential election. Roh's election was notable for the arrival in power of a new generation of Korean politicians, the so-called 386 Generation (people in their thirties, when the term was coined, who had attended university in the 1980s and who were born in the 1960s). This generation had been veterans of student protests against authoritarian rule and advocated a conciliatory approach towards North Korea, even at the expense of good relations with the United States. Roh himself was the first South Korean president to be born after the end of Japanese rule in Korea.

South Korea received the highest marks on the Reporters Without Borders Press Freedom Index under his administration. The value of the South Korean won against the US dollar was the strongest during his administration since 1997. Due to the strong currency, for the first time in history, South Korea became the world's 10th largest economy and exceeded the $20,000 milestone in nominal GDP per capita during his administration. In 2007, he met with North Korean leader Kim Jong Il in Pyongyang. However, despite high expectations at the beginning of his presidency, Roh encountered strong opposition from both the opposition conservative Grand National Party and media, and he was frequently accused of incompetence. As a result, many of Roh's policies, such as a plan to move the capital of Seoul and a plan to form a coalition with the opposition, made little progress. Because of his poor performance in economy and diplomacy, Roh was not a popular president, having the worst approval rating on average ever recorded in South Korean political history.

After leaving office, Roh returned to his hometown of Bongha Village. He ran a duck farm and lived an ordinary life, sharing it through his blog. He also ran a website called "Democracy 2.0" to promote healthy online discussions. Fourteen months later, Roh was suspected of bribery by prosecutors, and the subsequent investigations attracted public attention. Roh committed suicide on 23 May 2009 when he jumped from a mountain cliff behind his home, after saying that "there are too many people suffering because of me" on a suicide note on his computer. About 4 million people visited Roh's hometown in the week following his death. His suicide was confirmed by police. Prosecutor General Lim Chae-jin resigned due to growing public criticism following Roh's death. Public opinion on Roh has improved considerably since his death, which has taken into account his human rights background and national economic progress during his presidency. In a 2019 Gallup Korea poll, Roh was cited as the most popular president in South Korean history amongst the general public.

== Early life and education ==
Roh was born into a poor farming family on 1 September 1946, in Bongha Village near Gimhae and Busan, in what is now southeastern South Korea. His parents had three boys and two girls, and Roh was the youngest of his family. In 1953, he entered Dae Chang Elementary School. He received high grades, but was quite often absent from school to assist his parents. While in sixth grade, with the encouragement of his school teacher, he became the president of the school. As he entered Jin-yeong middle school, a writing contest was held to commemorate Syngman Rhee's birthday. Roh tried to start a student movement against it, but was caught and suspended from the school.

Roh decided to become a lawyer due to the influence of his elder brother who had studied law but had died in a car accident. Roh had to study the bar exam in his own in 1975 (South Korea does not currently require bar examinees to have graduated from college, university, or law school).

== Legal career ==
After passing the bar exam he became a regional judge in Daejeon in 1977, but quit only a year later deciding to became a lawyer.

In 1981, he defended students who had been tortured for suspicion of possession of contraband literature. Following this he decided to become a human rights lawyer. In early 2003, he was quoted as saying, "After that defense, my life was totally changed. At first, even I couldn't believe that they had been tortured that harshly. However, when I saw their horrified eyes and their missing toenails, my comfortable life as a lawyer came to an end. I became a man that wanted to make a difference in the world." With fellow human rights lawyers, he pointed out that this case was forged, then claimed that the National Security Act (South Korea) itself should be judged.

In 1985 he started to participate in civic movements by assuming permanent power of attorney on behalf of the Busan council of citizen democracy. He opposed the autocratic regime in place at the time in South Korea, and participated in the pro-democracy June Democracy Movement in 1987 against Chun Doo-hwan. The same year he was jailed while investigating the cause of death of the Daewoo Shipbuilding & Marine Engineering factory worker Lee Seok-Kyu, who had been killed by a stray police tear gas bullet while on strike during the Great Workers' Struggle. Roh was accused of 'unapproved interference in the case' and 'hindering the funeral'. Although he was released in twenty days because of public opinion against the arrest, his lawyer's license was revoked after the incident in political retribution. His lawyer's license was reinstated and he, along with Chun Jung Bae and Im Jong In, founded Haemaru Law firm.

Roh was baptized as a Roman Catholic (baptismal name: Justin) in 1986 but then lapsed while continuing to identify as a Catholic, though later years he was non-religious while practicing a form of Mahayana Buddhism.

== Early political career ==
Roh entered politics in 1988 when he was invited by Kim Young-sam to join the Reunification Democratic Party (통일민주당). That same year, he was elected as a member of the National Assembly, representing Dong District, Busan. He came to wider public attention with his cross-examination of the government over political corruption allegations in a parliamentary hearing.

In 1990, Kim Young-sam merged his party with the Democratic Justice Party to form the Democratic Liberal Party, a forerunner of the Grand National Party. Roh did not participate in the party and he criticized it as "betrayal against the democracy movement".

In 1991, before the election of the national assembly, the Weekly Chosun posted an article that alleging that Roh was a politician with hidden wealth. Roh sued the company for defamation and won, but lost the election for his seat.

Having lost his seat in the 1992 Assembly elections, he later ran for the mayorship of Busan in 1995, where he lost again. Shortly after the election, Kim Dae-jung founded the National Congress for New Politics, but Roh did not join. In 1996, he ran for the Assembly seat for Jongno District, Seoul, losing to another future president, Lee Myung-bak.

Roh founded the new party with Lee Bu-Yeong, Lee Chul, Kim Won-Gi, and Kim Jeong-Gil, but before the presidential election, after the New Korea Party merged with the United Democratic Party, he decided to reconcile with Kim Dae-jung to 'bring the military government and their political heir into justice'.

Subsequently, Roh reconciled with Kim when he endorsed his candidacy in the 1997 Presidential election. At the meeting, Kim Dae-jung welcomed Roh and his party saying "Today is a very pleasant day. That pleasure is not only because we now work together, but also because I could relieve a burden in my mind that I have been carrying (since we separated)." Roh returned to office in 1998, when Lee Myung-bak resigned his seat because of a violation of election law, winning a seat in the ensuing by-election.

=== National Assembly campaign ===
In 2000, Roh ran for the National Assembly representing Buk-gu and Gangseo-gu in Busan as part of a campaign to overcome regionalism in Korean politics, but was defeated. His defeat in the election, however, proved fortuitous when his supporters formed Nosamo, the first political fan club in Korea. His supporters were inspired by his commitment to overcoming regionalism.

== Minister of Maritime Affairs and Fisheries ==
In 2000, Roh was appointed Minister of Maritime Affairs and Fisheries under Kim Dae-jung, and this position would constitute his major government experience prior to the presidency.

== Presidential election ==
Roh got public attention when he participated in candidate election of his party. The candidate election itself also got high public attention because it allowed the vote not only from the party members, but also the local citizens. At first, his approval rate was 10%, allowing much gap with leading candidate Lee In-Jae, but Roh constantly earned much supporters by his notable speeches, especially in Ulsan, and the result of poll that Roh's approval rate was 41.7%, 1.1% higher than the Lee Hoi-chang, candidate of the opponent party, convinced the voters of his party.

Roh won the presidency on 19 December 2002, by defeating Lee Hoi-chang with a narrow 2% margin of victory. At 2003, right before his inauguration, he described his plan as "I will root the method of discussion inside the government.", and added, "discussion should be familiarized until we are called 'Republic of discussion'."

== Presidency (2003–2008) ==
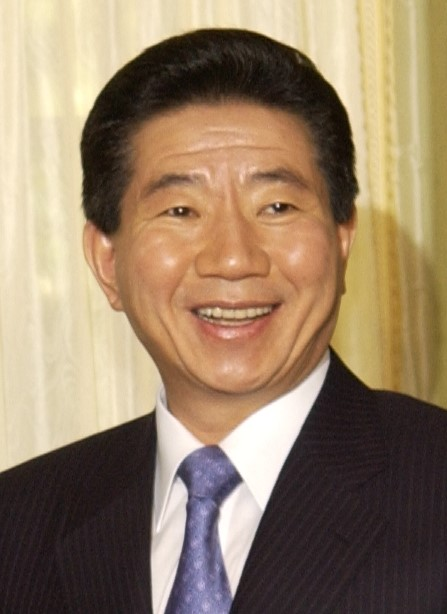
- Presidency of Roh Moo-hyun; Powers suspended from March 12 – May 14, 2004
- Presidency of Roh Moo-hyun; 25 February 2003 – 25 February 2008
- Prime Minister: Goh Kun; Lee Hae-chan; Han Myeong-sook; Han Duck-soo
- Cabinet: Full list
- Party: Millennium Democratic (Feb–Nov. 2003); Uri (2003–2007); Independent (2007–2008)
- Election: 2002
- Seat: Seoul

=== First year ===
Roh dubbed his administration the "Participatory Government", and entered office intent on introducing an ambitious new agenda. Policy goals for the Roh administration included the continuance of the Sunshine Policy of engagement towards North Korea, the establishment of Korea as a business hub in Northeast Asia, the expansion of social welfare, the pursuit of "balanced national development" to help underdeveloped areas, the eradication of corruption, reform of education and tax systems, reform of labor-management relations, reform of mass media, and a recasting of the relationship with the United States and Japan.

As his policy for eradicating corruption inside the government had included many administrative reforms, he had to face high opposition. During the reformation of the prosecution, to resolve the opposition, he suggested a TV forum. The prosecutors insisted that Roh appointed the major positions of the prosecutor's office without consulting the personnel committee, and Roh answered that "The current members of the personnel committee themselves represent the old prosecution which has to be changed, if we do not change now, it would sustain the old prosecution at least few months." Three months into his presidency, he commented about the opposition problem, stating "I'm worrying the opposition that maybe I cannot continue the presidency while I get that much of it." That comment was quoted partly by conservative media, ('I cannot continue the presidency') and Roh was beset by skepticism about his ability and experience. Roh set the tone of his administration with a number of adventurous policies, and measures to uncover and reveal the names of the descendants of Japanese collaborators. The investigations, criticized by opposition parties as a covert means of attacking them, and coming too late to provide substantive redress, mostly resulted in damage to his own party members.

Also in his first year in office, Roh announced South Korea's Free Trade Agreement Policy Roadmap. Roh successfully pushed for free trade agreements in spite of domestic opposition from his traditional leftist constituency (who denounced it as "neoliberal") and various groups (particularly farmers) opposed to market opening.

=== Uri Party and impeachment ===
Roh and his supporters left the Millennium Democratic Party in 2003 to form a new party, the Uri Party (열린우리당; lit. '"Our Open Party"'). Directly ahead of the National Assembly elections, Roh voiced support for the Uri Party, which constituted a technical violation of Constitutional provisions mandating presidential impartiality. After Roh refused to apologize, led by the opposition parties holding the majority, the Assembly voted to impeach him for illegal electioneering on 12 March 2004. The vote was 193–2 (Uri Party members abstained from the vote). Roh's supporters physically blocked the motion for three days in open combat, and had to be hauled out by security guards. Roh's executive power was suspended pending a final decision by the Constitutional Court, and Prime Minister Goh Kun ran the country as the Acting President.

The National Assembly's attempt to impeach Roh was largely opposed by the public. From 12 March 2004, to 27 March, protest against the impeachment motion was led by 'citizen's movement for eradicating corruption'. According to the police, 50,000 people gathered to protest on 13 March alone.

Although Roh's popularity had hovered around 30%, the impeachment was taken as a power struggle against the political reform and the choice of the citizen, and Roh's popularity went up soon after the assembly's vote to impeach Roh. The results of the April 2004 parliamentary election showed public support for him, with the Uri Party winning a majority of seats.

On 14 May 2004, the Constitutional Court overturned the impeachment decision, restoring Roh as president. After the incident, Roh joined the Uri party as a member, officially making the Uri party as the ruling party. It was the first time that a liberal party achieved a majority in the National Assembly.

=== After the reinstatement ===
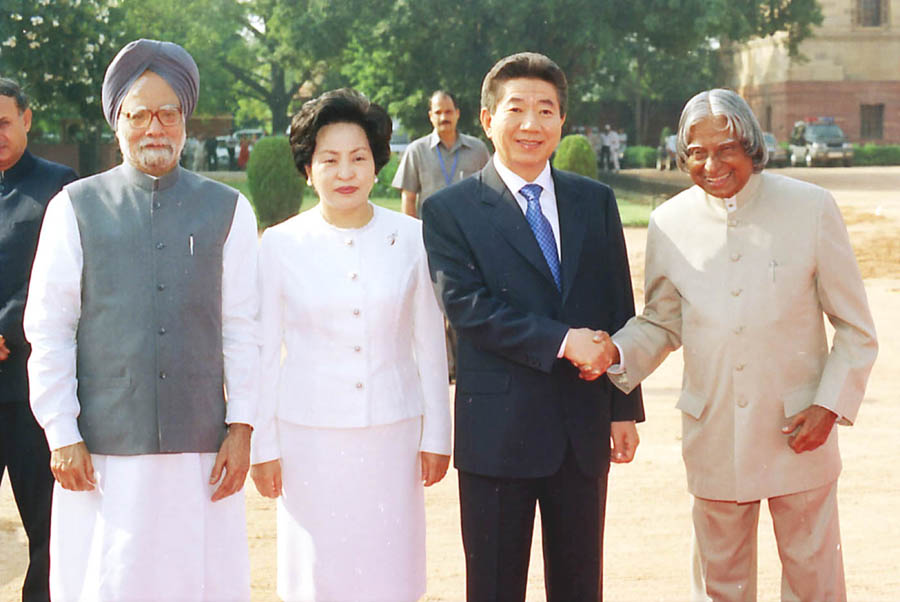
Roh and his wife Kwon Yang-sook in India with Manmohan Singh and A.P.J Abdul Kalam in 2004

As a part of his balanced national development campaign to reverse the concentration of wealth in Seoul, Roh also pursued a plan to relocate the capital 100 miles away to South Chungcheong Province, ostensibly to relieve congestion. Roh had made this promise during his campaign, and pursued its fulfillment, despite convincing few voters outside the Chungcheong region of the benefits of the move. After much controversy, the Constitutional Court obviated Roh's plans by ruling that the relocation of the capital was unconstitutional because it 'opposes the custom that has to be considered as the constitution', thus inflicting a huge blow to Roh's political standing. Roh's plan was then amended to the creation of an "administrative capital", though this plan has also not yet seen completion. The issue of the proposed "administrative capital" remains controversial as of 2010 in plans for Sejong City, the exact nature of which continues to be a politically divisive issue even within the ruling Grand National Party.

With the controversies concerning the capital, perceptions of neglect and mismanagement of the economy had grown. Although exports performed at record levels and the economy grew, growth still lagged behind both the previous administration and the rest of the world, while the domestic economy stagnated. At the same time regulations proliferated, investment capital exited the country, unemployment (especially among the young) increased, wealthy students flocked overseas as the education system stagnated, and housing prices in Seoul soared far beyond the reach of the average citizen. Roh responded by dismissing criticism as "shameless mudslinging", and touted the achievements of his government in increasing national competitiveness, strengthening the economy. This somewhat cavalier attitude led to his Uri Party suffering consecutive defeats in the Assembly, before eventually collapsing. Roh's unpopularity had become a liability for his party, and a new party was needed to disassociate from him. The Uri Party would thus be revamped and renamed as the Democratic Party, before being re-established again using the same name and taking a legislative majority in 2025.

Roh's ambitious initial promises to establish Korea as an international business hub in Asia faded soon after his election. Instead, Korea under Roh suffered negative publicity in the foreign business community due to prosecutorial investigations on the purchase and sale of Korea Exchange Bank by the Lone Star Fund, spurring foreign investors to join their domestic counterparts in leaving the country. When housing prices soared, to prevent speculative bubble like Japanese asset price bubble crisis, Roh introduced additional 1~3% of property tax on real estate exceeding 600 million won (about 600,000US$). This efficiently slowed down the bubble, but this policy met high opposition from the richest who had to pay higher tax. At the same time, Roh also increased welfare spending by 18% a year, and drastically increased spending by increasing the size of the civil service by more than 95,700 new hires, or approximately 60 people a day. Criticism of lax discipline among the civil service and police force was high during his government.

The remainder of Roh's term was characterized by a number of campaigns pursued to varying degrees of success and completion. One of the more successful campaigns (at least during his term) was Roh's pursuit of an FTA with the United States, concluded in April 2007 after many months of negotiations by Kim Hyun-jong, the deputy minister for trade.

=== Grand coalition plan ===
As a result of the controversy concerning the capital, and public dissatisfaction of economic development, Uri party lost much of its popularity. When the Uri party was defeated in by-elections held on 30 April 2005, losing every one of the 23 electoral districts, Uri Party lost its majority in the National Assembly. Facing the outcome of his unpopularity, Roh took a rather strange measure to manage the government when he proposed a grand coalition with the opposition Grand National Party. Roh's rationale was that since it was impossible to continue his presidency with an approval rate of around 20 percent, a grand coalition comprising the Uri party and the Grand National Party was desirable, and that the difference between both parties in terms of political agendas was actually minute. Roh promised he would yield much of his power and might even resign from office if a grand coalition was successfully launched.

Roh's proposal for the grand coalition stirred yet another national controversy. Many called his plan "reckless and completely ignorant" of the sentiments of people still ailing from repeated political controversies and economic hardships. Many of the Uri party's supporters who identify as liberals were enraged at Roh holding that his party was not really different from the conservative opposition. The Grand National Party, enjoying relatively strong approval rate but still bent on revenge for the party's defeat in major elections, repeatedly declined to initiate a negotiation for the coalition. While the Uri Party grudgingly supported the President's proposal, a lawmaker defected from the party in protest of Roh's plan, and the loss of popularity was felt when the party suffered yet another complete defeat in the by-election on 26 October 2005, this time including one of the party's stronghold electoral districts. Roh's plan was scrapped, having failed to garner support from either political faction.

=== Foreign relations ===
==== United States ====
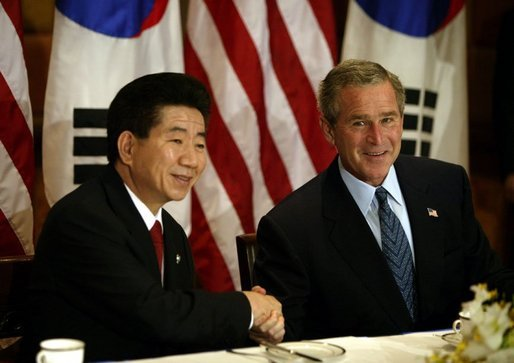
President Roh and Bush in October 2003

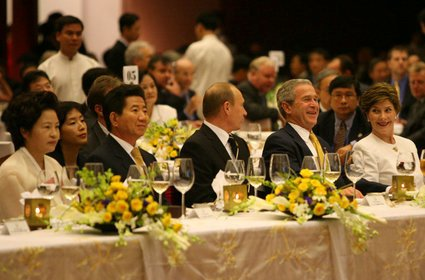
Roh Moo-hyun and Kwon Yang-sook at the 2006 APEC gala dinner with President Vladimir Putin of Russia (centre) and George W. Bush and his wife Laura Bush (right)

Roh was perceived as an anti-American before the presidential race, which was not a handicap during the presidential campaign. Public antipathy to the United States was prevalent in 2002, particularly evoked by the Yangju highway incident, where two South Korean middle school girls were crushed to death by a U.S. Army armored bridge-laying vehicle. The American soldiers involved were tried by a U.S. Army court martial, but the Roh administration continued to demand a South Korean trial, although the incident occurred 'on duty' (as part of a convoy) and thus was an American responsibility under the Status of Forces Agreement between the United States and South Korea.

However, except for policies toward North Korea, Roh was supportive toward the United States. Roh endeavored to improve relations with North Korea, becoming the first president to cross the border by foot and meeting Kim Jong Il. He dispatched the Zaytun Division to support the US in the Iraq War by carrying out peacekeeping and other reconstruction-related tasks. Roh explained the deployment as only a peacekeeping mission and claimed that such commitment was required to bring favor from the United States in resolving the North Korean nuclear crisis. He also pursued the KORUS FTA. In 2004, the Roh administration reached an agreement with the US to move out all US forces in the capital to Camp Humphreys, a rural area far away from the capital or major cities, as he deemed the USFK's presence in the capital unnecessary and harming its reputation and development.

In February 2006, Roh announced that South Korea would initiate negotiations with the United States for a free trade agreement.

In April 2007, Roh presided over an emergency meeting of his aides to discuss the diplomatic fallout from the massacre at Virginia Polytechnic Institute in the United States by a South Korean student, Cho Seung-hui, concerning its negative impact on South Korea-U.S. relations. They were discussing comprehensive measures to cope with the unprecedented incident, including issuance of presidential messages of apology and plans to prevent possible harassment of South Koreans living in the United States. Roh issued two messages of condolence already on 17 April 2007.

Former Secretary of Defense Robert Gates described Roh as "anti-American and probably a little crazy" in his book titled Duty, and professed astonishment at Roh telling him at the meeting in November 2007 that "the two biggest security threats in Asia were the United States and Japan".

==== Japan ====
South Korea's relationship with Japan was in a healthy condition when Roh entered office. However, his first visit to the neighboring country in 2003 was scheduled on a date that coincided with Korean Memorial Day.

During the visit, Roh proclaimed he would not seek any more apologies from Japan over its colonial occupation, in the hope of maintaining a friendly relationship between the two countries. Although Roh's proclamation was made in good faith, some expressed concern that Japan may have interpreted this as the termination of its responsibility for the colonial past, and use it as an excuse to deny any claims for compensation that may arise in the future.

Despite Roh's hope, relations with Japan deteriorated henceforth, in several areas of conflict such as compensation issues for comfort women, denial of the colonial past in Japanese history textbooks, and disputes over the Liancourt Rocks. Another sensitive issue, former Prime Minister of Japan Junichiro Koizumi's repeated visits to Yasukuni Shrine were harshly criticized in South Korea, and Roh declared no further meetings with Koizumi would take place unless he stopped visiting the shrine.

According to Rep. Chung Mong-joon, former leader of the ruling Saenuri Party, "The Roh Moo-hyun administration proposed that the U.S. define Japan as a hypothetical enemy," at the Korea-U.S. Security Consultative Meeting in Seoul in October 2005. "President Roh proposed it because the general public had bad feelings against Japan and Korea had a territorial dispute over the Dokdo islets with Japan, Washington was very embarrassed since it had hoped Korea and Japan would go hand-in-hand as free and democratic countries. A hypothetical enemy in English implies a main enemy."

In an address to the nation on 25 April 2006 regarding disputes over the Liancourt Rocks, Roh reaffirmed that he didn't seek another apology from Japan, but demanded that Japan take action in compliance with its past apologies. The then-Prime Minister of Japan Junichiro Koizumi characterized the speech as intended for domestic audiences.

== Retirement and post-presidency (2008–2009) ==
After leaving office, Roh retired to his hometown of Bongha Village. This marked a break with previous customs, where former presidents retired to heavily guarded houses in Seoul. Bongha – a village of 121 people – became a major tourist attraction due to Roh's presence.

== Bribery allegations ==
On 4 December 2008, Roh Moo-hyun's elder brother, Roh Gun-Pyeong, was indicted on charges of illegally taking 3 million won ($3,000) from former Daewoo Engineering & Construction and imprisoned.

On 7 April 2009, Chung Sang-Moon, the former secretary of Roh Moo-hyun, was arrested on charges. In early 2009, allegations of corruption had begun to surface regarding the former President's family and aides, eventually leading to the indictment of Roh's elder brother Roh Gun-Pyeong on suspicion of influence peddling. The investigation soon expanded to encompass Roh Moo-Hyun's aides, as well as other members of his family. As the investigation closed in on Roh's former secretary, Chung Sang-Moon, Roh announced on his website that "The accusation should be directed at our household, not Chung. Our household made the request, received money and used it." At the same time, Roh claimed that he himself had not known of the money transfer before his retirement. By May 2009, prosecutors had summoned Roh's wife, son, and eventually the former president himself on suspicion of receiving 1 million dollars in bribes from Park Yeon-Cha, a businessman close to the ex-President. Roh was subject to initial written questioning by prosecutors, before direct questioning, prior to which he apologized again to the public and stated that "he was overwhelmed by shame."

Kang Kum-won was another Roh's long time supporter whose business was under thorough investigation by The Supreme Prosecutors' Office (SPO). Even if Kang was Roh's closest long time supporter, he did not expand his business during Roh's presidency to avoid unnecessary suspicion of special benefits. However, his parole was denied during the investigation despite his terminal illness of brain cancer until Roh's death.

Roh's investigation for corruption came after he had campaigned on pledges to "clean up the presidency", and root out corruption, while condemning his opponents as hopelessly corrupt.

In one speech to commemorate the 20th anniversary of Korea's "June Struggle" for democracy, Roh vehemently attacked critics who described him as incompetent, stating, "They even deal out the absurd rhetoric that they would rather have a corrupt administration than an inept one while openly revealing their true colors as forces of corruption and the security-driven dictatorships of the past. What's more, they label the democratic forces as being inept, plotting to rise to power on the back of the nostalgia for the development-oriented dictatorships of the past."

Roh's characteristically self-righteous stance resulted in harsh condemnation of the ex-President for hypocrisy. In response to the pervasive criticism upon Roh's bribery charges, he stated on his website, "I have lost my moral cause just with the facts I have so far admitted. The only thing left is the legal procedure". Roh further added, "What I have to do now is bow to the nation and apologize. From now on, the name Roh cannot be a symbol of the values you pursue. I'm no longer qualified to speak about democracy and justice.... You should abandon me." Despite these appeals, Roh continued to deny all knowledge of the receipt of money by his family from Park Yeon-Cha, in contradiction to Park's testimony. Roh refused cross-examination with Park.

In contrast to scandals involving previous presidents, who reportedly used illicit funds close to $500 million to finance political campaigns and their family activities, Roh's family had to use borrowed funds close to $1.5 million from a friend for personal use, such as the payment of living expenses for study in the United States.

== Death ==
Roh Moo-Hyun was found seriously injured on the morning of 23 May 2009 after apparently jumping from a 45-meter (150 ft) cliff known as Bueong'i Bawi (lit. Owl's Rock) behind his rural home in his home village of Bongha. He sustained serious head injuries and was sent by car to Seyoung hospital nearby at 7:20 am. He was moved to Busan University Hospital around 8:15 am. Around 9:30 am (00:30 GMT), he died at the age of 62. Police investigators ruled out conspiracy theories surrounding the death of Roh. According to police, Roh switched on his computer and typed a hastily worded suicide note.

The police report stated that the suicide note apologized for making "too many people suffer" and requested that his body be cremated.

I am in debt to so many people. I have caused too great a burden to be placed upon them. I can't begin to fathom the countless agonies down the road. The rest of my life would only be a burden for others. I am unable to do anything because of poor health. I can't read, I can't write. Do not be too sad. Isn't life and death all a part of nature? Do not be sorry. Do not feel resentment toward anyone. It is fate. Cremate me. And leave only a small tombstone near home. I've thought on this for a long time.

The 8th president, Kim Dae-jung, stated that "President Roh Moo-hyun loved Koreans more than any other president. During the unfair investigation, he suffered from humiliation, chagrin, deception, and defamation, which left him no option but to commit suicide before his countryman to show his innocence." The 10th president, Lee Myung-bak, stated that "the news was truly unbelievable and deeply saddening." Justice Minister Kim Kyung-han said the corruption case against him would be formally closed. However, he did not say whether the former president's family would continue to be investigated.

A State Funeral was held from 23 May to 29 May 2009, and was attended by President Lee Myung-bak, First Lady Kim Yoon-ok, former First Lady Lee Hee-ho, former presidents Kim Dae-jung, Kim Young-sam and members of National Assembly. However, former Presidents Chun Doo-hwan and Roh Tae-woo were absent. The funeral started from his hometown, Bong-Ha village, with his body transported to Seoul via a hearse, with a convoy with his family moving together. Then, he was cremated in Suwon, Gyeonggi Province and his ashes were buried in his hometown in accordance with his will, which was recorded on the suicide note.

Roh's suicide followed the suicides of a number of high-profile figures under corruption investigations in Korea in recent years, including the former Prime Minister Han Seung-soo's secretary Kim Young-chul, former Busan mayor Ahn Sang-Young (who died by suicide while in prison), Park Tae-young, former governor of Jeolla province, and Chung Mong-hun, a former Hyundai executive. Roh himself had been sued by the widow of former Daewoo E&C head Nam Sang-Guk for allegedly making defamatory comments that drove her husband to throw himself off of a bridge. Roh's suicide was followed later in the year by the suicide of another politician, the Mayor of Yangsan, who was being subject to a corruption investigation.

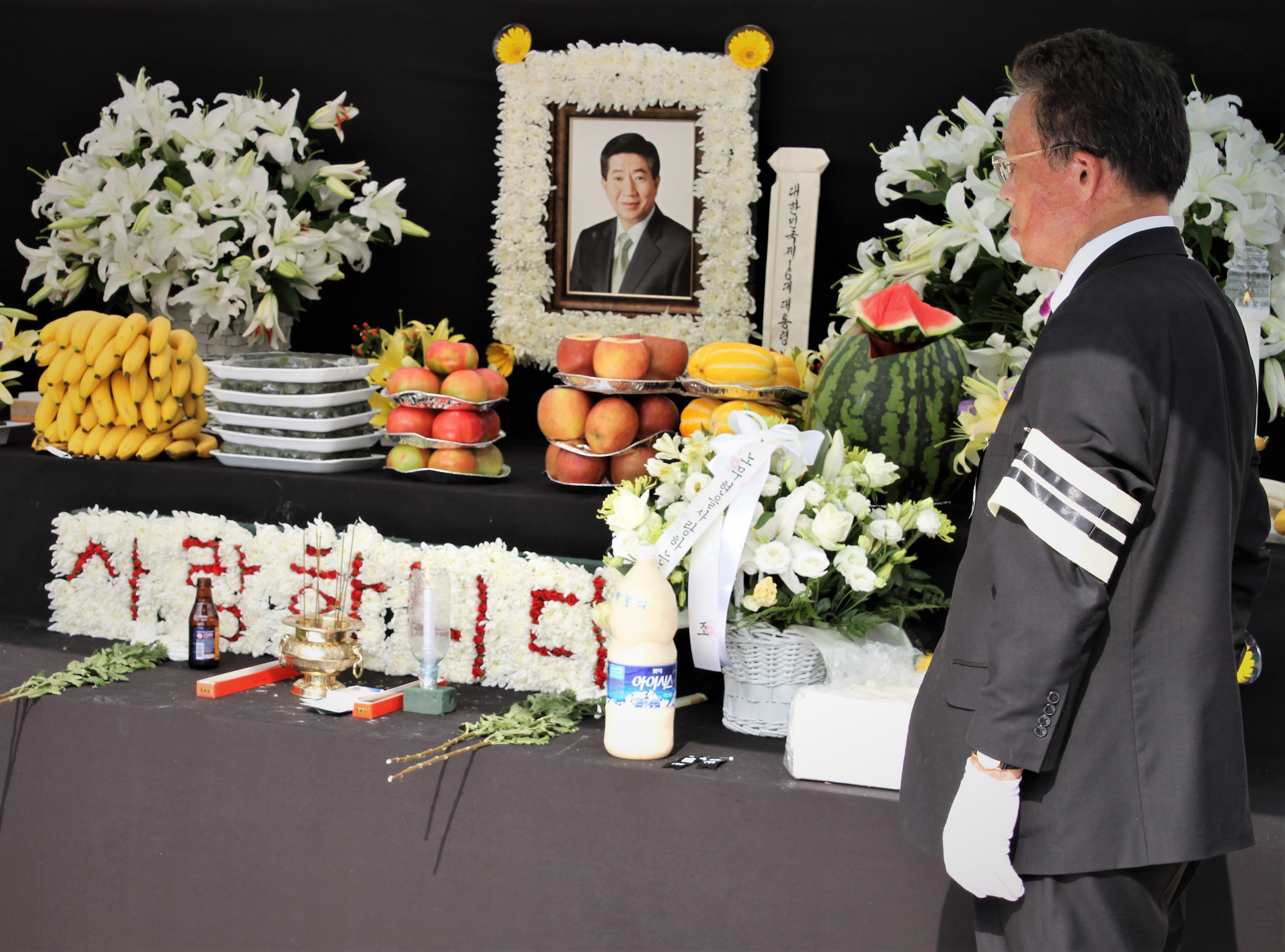
Sidewalk memorial for Roh set up across the street from Seoul City Hall on 8 July 2009.

Roh's public funeral involved Buddhist and Catholic rites. Hundreds of thousands of supporters turned out to pay their respects in memorial shrines erected around the country, as did President Lee Myung-bak and numerous other prominent politicians. Sporadic violent demonstrations in Seoul immediately after the funeral resulted in the detention of 72 people.

Roh's suicide resulted in a sudden positive shift in domestic perception towards the late President, leading Kim Dong-gil, one of the conservative figures to comment, "How could he become an instant saint upon his suicide?" Perceptions of an excessive investigation on Roh's alleged improprieties boosted support for the opposition Democratic Party (itself formed when Roh's then unpopularity made it a liability to be associated with him), giving them enough leverage to demand that President Lee Myung-bak apologize for the "politically motivated" investigation they claimed caused Roh's death, and discipline those responsible. Support for the opposition party increased to 28.3%, outpolling the ruling GNP at 23.5%. The Democratic Party also decided to block the scheduled opening of the National Assembly until the Lee Myung-bak government accepted responsibility for Roh's suicide. The chief prosecutor in Roh's bribery case also resigned. A year after Roh died, his autobiography was published by his personal and political fellows. Based on Roh's previous books, unpublished draft, notes, letters and interviews, it follows Roh's life from birth to death.

Roh died almost three months before former President Kim Dae-jung died on 18 August 2009 of multiple organ dysfunction syndrome. Former Prime Minister Han Myeong-suk and others claimed that the investigation of Roh's corruption case leading to his death was President Lee's political revenge and murder.

== Legacy ==
In January 2010, dissatisfaction with the poor electoral showing of the minority Democratic Party, and a posthumous reappraisal of Roh Moo-hyun's presidency spurred the creation of a new party, the "Participation Party". This party was created to "revive the spirit of former President Roh Moo-hyun."

One of Roh's biggest accomplishments was revising regulations for political fundraising, which even one of his harshest critics, Hong Joon-pyo has praised. Before the revision, previous presidential candidates received more than $300 million hush money from leaving president to run the presidential campaign. During Roh's initial campaign for the presidency, civilians donated their piggy banks raising close to $1.2 million, but not enough to match about $12 million his opponent raised.

The Institute for Future Korea (한국미래발전연구원) is established for researching and promoting Roh Moo-hyun's social ideas.

A leaked American diplomatic cable to South Korea revealed that Roh Moo-hyun expressed concerns how the US government mistreated North Korea.

Lee In-gyu (이인규), the former head of the SPO, released his book on the involvements of the political corruptions surrounding the investigation against Roh that led to his suicide. In his book, Lee acknowledged that the South Korean National Intelligence Service had intentionally released overly sensational stories about President Roh's bribery charges.

In 2010, a year after his death, the politicians who were Roh's aides won the local elections and became the provincial government heads. In January 2012, Han Myung-Sook who had been one of the prime ministers in Roh's tenure was elected party leader of the biggest opposition party, the Democratic United Party. She officially made clear "succession of Roh's policy". Although his policy was regarded as failure when he was in the position, it has been reevaluated as liberal and nationalistic, compared to Lee Myung-Bak's authoritarian and pro-US policy. Even a conservative professor, Lee Sang-don, who had severely criticized Roh's policy, said that "Roh became a myth (of our age)."

On the 10th anniversary of his passing, former US President George W. Bush paid respects at the annual memorial ceremony for Roh Moo-hyun.

He was ranked first in the 2019 Gallup South Korea survey asking for the greatest president.

== Electoral record ==
Year	Elections	Constituency	Political party	No. of votes	%	Results
1988	13th National Assembly General Election	Dong District (Busan)	Reunification Democratic Party	53,075	51.00%	Won
1992	14th National Assembly General Election	Dong District (Busan)	Democratic Party	30,397	32.23%	Defeated (2nd)
1995	1st Iocal Election	Busan (Mayoral Elections)	Democratic Party	647,297	37.58%	Defeated (2nd)
1996	15th National Assembly General Election	Jongno District (Seoul)	United Democratic Party	17,330	17.67%	Defeated (3rd)
1998	July 1998 By-election	Jongno District (Seoul)	National Congress for New Politics	26,251	54.44%	Won
2000	16th National Assembly General Election	Buk District–Gangseo District B (Busan)	Millennium Democratic Party	27,136	35.69%	Defeated (2nd)
2002	2002 Presidential Election	South Korea	Millennium Democratic Party	12,014,277	48.91%	Won

== Awards and honours ==
=== National honours ===
- South Korea:
  - Recipient of the Grand Order of Mugunghwa (As the President of South Korea)

=== Foreign honours ===
- Algeria:
  - Recipient of the National Order of Merit
- Denmark:
  - Recipient of Order of the Elephant
- Poland:
  - Recipient of Order of the White Eagle
- Qatar:
  - Recipient of the Order of Independence
- Spain:
  - Collar of the Order of Civil Merit
- United Kingdom:
  - Honorary Knight Grand Cross of the Order of the Bath

== In popular culture ==
The 2013 film The Attorney starring Song Kang-ho is a dramatic adaptation of Roh's early human rights law career. It became the eighth highest-grossing film in South Korean history at the time of its release, and was the second-highest grossing South Korean film of 2013 behind Miracle in Cell No. 7.

== Authored books ==
- Roh Moo-hyun (1 September 1994). 여보, 나 좀 도와줘 [Honey, Please help me] (in Korean) (1st ed.). Seoul: Sae-teo. ISBN 978-89-87175-19-5.
- ———————— (30 November 2001). 노무현이 만난 링컨 [Lincoln that Roh Moo-hyun met] (in Korean). Seoul: Hakgojae Books. ISBN 978-89-85846-89-9.
- ———————— (15 October 2002). 노무현의 리더십 이야기 [Roh Moo-hyun's Leadership Story] (in Korean) (1st ed.). Seoul: Happy Reading. ISBN 978-89-89571-07-0.
- ———————— (22 September 2009). 성공과 좌절 [Success and Frustration] (in Korean) (1st ed.). Seoul: Hakgojae Books. ISBN 978-89-5625-096-0.
- ———————— (27 November 2009). 진보의 미래 [The future of progress] (in Korean) (1st ed.). Paju: Dongnyok. ISBN 978-89-7297-608-0.
- ———————— (26 April 2010). Rhyu Si-min; Roh Moo-hyun Foundation (eds.). 운명이다 [The fate of the Roh Moo-hyun] (in Korean) (1st ed.). Paju: Dolbegae. ISBN 978-89-7199-386-6.
- ———————— (3 May 2019). Roh Moo-hyun Foundation (ed.). 그리하여 노무현이라는 사람은 [So the person called Roh Moo-hyun]. Roh Moo-hyun's Complete Works (in Korean). Vol. 6. Paju: Dolbegae. ISBN 978-89-7199-947-9.

== See also ==
- 2002 South Korean presidential election
- Roh's involvement in Hwang Woo-suk scandal
- Social liberalism
- U.S.-Korea Free Trade Agreement

== Notes ==
National Assembly of the Republic of Korea
Preceded by Park Chan-jong; Kim Jung-kil (Jung District–Dong District–Yeongdo District, Busan)	Member of the National Assembly from Dong District, (Busan); 30 May 1988–29 May 1992	Succeeded by Hur Sam-soo
Preceded by Lee Myung-bak	Member of the National Assembly from Jongno District (Seoul); 22 July 1998–29 May 2000	Succeeded by ~~Chung In-bong~~; Park Jin
Political offices
Preceded by Lee Hang-kyu	Minister of Oceans and Fisheries; 7 August 2000–25 March 2001	Succeeded by Chung Woo-taik
Preceded by Kim Dae-jung	President of South Korea; 25 February 2003–24 February 2008 (Powers and duties suspended) 12 March 2004 – 14 May 2004	Succeeded by Lee Myung-bak
Diplomatic posts
Preceded by Ricardo Lagos	Chairperson of APEC; 2005	Succeeded by Nguyễn Minh Triết
Party political offices
Preceded by Kim Dae-jung	Millennium Democratic Party nominee for President of South Korea; 2002	Succeeded by Chung Dong-young (Grand Unified Democratic New Party nominee for President of South Korea); Lee In-je (Democratic Party Nominee for President of South Korea)
