= Jongno (constituency) =

Constituency of the National Assembly of Republic of Korea

- Single-member constituency for the National Assembly
- Location of the constituency
- District(s): Jongno District
- Region: Seoul
- Electorate: 126,041 (2024)

Current constituency
- Created: 1988
- Seats: 1
- Party: Democratic Party
- Member of Parliament: Kwak Sang-eon
- Council constituency: Jongno 1st district Jongno 2nd district
- Created from: Jongno–Jung

Jongno (Korean: 종로구) is a constituency of the National Assembly of South Korea. The constituency consists solely of the Jongno District, Seoul. As of 2020, 134,516 eligible voters were registered in the constituency. In the course of the Democratic Party of Korea's primary election, Lee Nak-yeon, a member of the district's National Assembly, resigned.

Located at the heart of the Downtown Seoul, Jongno is home to Korea's major government offices and foreign embassies, and is often described as 'Korea's No. 1 political district' (정치 1번지). Including the current Jongno constituency and its historic A and B constituencies, three presidents were elected after being elected in Jongno.

== List of members of the National Assembly ==
Election	Member	Party	Dates	Notes
1988	Lee Jong-chan	Democratic Justice	1988–1996	Minister of Home Affairs (1988); Director of the National Intelligence Service (1998–1999)
1992	Lee Jong-chan	Democratic Liberal	1988–1996	Minister of Home Affairs (1988); Director of the National Intelligence Service (1998–1999)
1996	Lee Myung-bak	New Korea	1996–1998	Mayor of Seoul (2002–2006); President of South Korea (2008–2013)
1998	Roh Moo-hyun	National Congress	1998–2000	Minister of Oceans and Fisheries (2000–2001); President of South Korea (2003–2008)
2000	~~Jeong In-bong~~	Grand National	2000–2002	Due to severe violation of electoral law, the entire electoral result was cancelled.
2002	Park Jin	Grand National	2002–2012	Minister of Foreign Affairs (2022–2024)
2004	Park Jin	Grand National	2002–2012	Minister of Foreign Affairs (2022–2024)
2008	Park Jin	Grand National	2002–2012	Minister of Foreign Affairs (2022–2024)
2012	Chung Sye-kyun	Democratic United	2012–2020	Floor leader of the Uri Party (2005–2006); Minister of Commerce, Industry and Energy (2006–2007); Chairman of the Uri Party (2007); Leader of the Democratic Party (2008–2010); Speaker of the National Assembly (2016–2018); Prime Minister of South Korea (2020–2021)
2016	Chung Sye-kyun	Democratic	2012–2020	Floor leader of the Uri Party (2005–2006); Minister of Commerce, Industry and Energy (2006–2007); Chairman of the Uri Party (2007); Leader of the Democratic Party (2008–2010); Speaker of the National Assembly (2016–2018); Prime Minister of South Korea (2020–2021)
2020	Lee Nak-yon	Democratic	2020–2021	Floor leader of the Democratic Party (2004–2006); Governor of South Jeolla Province (2014–2017); Prime Minister of South Korea (2017–2020); Leader of the Democratic Party (2020–2021); Co–Leader of the New Future (2024)
March 2022 by-elections	Choi Jae-hyung	People Power	2022–2024	Chairman of the Board of Audit and Inspection (2018–2021)
2024	Kwak Sang-eon	Democratic	2024–present	

== Election results ==
=== 2024 ===
Legislative Election 2024: Jongno
Party	Candidate	Votes	%	±%
Democratic	Kwak Sang-eon	44,713	50.92	new
People Power	Choi Jae-hyung	38,752	44.13	▼7.96
Reform	Keum Tae-sup	2,835	3.22	new
New Future	Jin Ye-chan	1,080	1.22	new
People's Democracy	Cha Eun-jeong	290	0.33	new
Korea People’s	Kim Jong-gap	85	0.09	new
Privilege Abolition	Kim Joon-soo	54	0.06	new
Rejected ballots		970	–	
Turnout		88,779	70.43	▼5.98
Registered electors		126,041		
Democratic gain from People Power		Swing		

=== March 2022 by-elections ===
March 2022 by-elections: Jongno
Party	Candidate	Votes	%
People Power	Choi Jae-hyung	49,637	52.09
Independent	Kim Yeong-jong	27,078	28.41
Justice	Bae Bok-joo	14,602	15.32
Independent	Seo Joo-won	552	1.20
Transition Korea	Kim Do-yeon	844	0.88
Independent	Park Jong-koo	552	0.57
New Wave	Song Moon-hee	535	0.56
Liberty Unification	Koo Bon-cheol	483	0.50
Dokdo Korea Party	Kim Doo-hwan	295	0.30
Unified Korea Party	Yoon Dae-kwan	113	0.11
Rejected ballots		3,679	–
Turnout		98,967	76.41
Registered electors		129,514	
People Power gain from Democratic			

=== 2020 ===
Legislative Election 2020: Jongno
Party	Candidate	Votes	%
Democratic	Lee Nak-yon	54,902	58.38
United Future	Hwang Kyo-ahn	37,594	39.97
Our Republican	Han Min-ho	417	0.44
Minjung	Oh In-hwan	276	0.29
Independent	Kim Yong-deok	260	0.27
NRDP	Park Jun-yeong	194	0.20
Peace and Human Rights	Lee Jeong-hui	139	0.14
Hannara	Kim Hyeong-suk	71	0.07
New Politics	Paik Byeong-chan	65	0.06
People's Democratic	Park So-hyeon	63	0.06
Republican	Kim Han-wool	57	0.06
Rejected ballots		1,201	–
Turnout		95,239	70.8
Registered electors		134,516	
Democratic hold			

=== 2016 ===
Legislative Election 2016: Jongno
Party	Candidate	Votes	%	±%
Democratic	Chung Sye-kyun	44,342	52.6	+0.3
Saenuri	Oh Se-hoon	33,490	39.7	−6.2
People's	Park Tae-soon	4,725	5.6	new
Green	Ha Seung-soo	590	0.7	new
Justice	Yun Gong-kyu	458	0.5	new
Labor	Kim Han-wool	353	0.4	new
Independent	Kim Dae-han	123	0.1	new
Independent	Lee Won-ok	100	0.1	new
Truth Korea	Lee Seok-in	62	0.1	new
Hannara	Park Jong-gu	56	0.1	new
Rejected ballots		594	–	–
Turnout		84,893	63.1	+6.0
Registered electors		134,507		
Democratic hold		Swing		

=== 2012 ===
Legislative Election 2012: Jongno
Party	Candidate	Votes	%	±%
Democratic United	Chung Sye-kyun	41,732	52.3	+7.5
Saenuri	Hong Sa-duk	36,641	45.9	−2.5
New Progressive	Choi Baek-soon	687	0.9	−0.7
Independent	Ryu Seung-gu	209	0.3	new
Nations’ Happiness	Hong Sung-hoon	177	0.2	new
Independent	Seo Maeng-jong	173	0.2	new
People's Power	Kim Joon-soo	153	0.2	new
Buddhist Union	Jeong Jae-bok	68	0.1	new
Rejected ballots		1,141	–	–
Turnout		80,981	57.1	+4.9
Registered electors		141,697		
Democratic United gain from Saenuri		Swing		

=== 2008 ===
Legislative Election 2008: Jongno
Party	Candidate	Votes	%	±%
Grand National	Park Jin	34,113	48.4	+5.4
United Democratic	Sohn Hak-kyu	31,530	44.8	new
Liberty Forward	Jeong In-bong	3,282	4.6	new
New Progressive	Choi Hyun-sook	1,138	1.6	new
Family Federation	Kim Young-dong	365	0.5	new
Rejected ballots		440	–	–
Turnout		70,868	52.2	−11.8
Registered electors		135,727		
Grand National hold		Swing		

=== 2004 ===
Legislative Election 2004: Jongno
Party	Candidate	Votes	%	±%
Grand National	Park Jin	37,431	42.8	−5.9
Uri	Kim Hong-shin	36,843	42.1	new
Millennium Democratic	Jeong Heung-jin	9,614	11.0	−29.0
Democratic Labor	Lee Sun-hee	2,950	3.4	+1.7
United Liberal Democrats	Paik Nam-seok	361	0.4	−3.7
Green Social Democrats	Yang Sung-ho	129	0.1	new
Senior Rights Protection	Yang Sung-ho	101	0.1	new
Rejected ballots		694	–	–
Turnout		88,123	64.0	+6.4
Registered electors		137,653		
Grand National hold		Swing		

=== 2002 (by-election) ===
By-election 2002: Jongno
Party	Candidate	Votes	%	±%
Grand National	Park Jin	20,300	50.3	+1.6
Independent	Jeong Heung-jin	9,597	23.8	new
Millennium Democratic	Yoo In-tae	8,953	22.2	−17.8
Democratic Labor	Yang Yeon-soo	1,500	3.7	+2.0
Rejected ballots		424	–	–
Turnout		40,774	28.9	
Registered electors		141,008		
Grand National hold		Swing		

=== 2000 ===
Legislative Election 2000: Jongno
Party	Candidate	Votes	%	±%
Grand National	Jeong In-bong	39,478	48.7	+5.5
Millennium Democratic	Lee Jong-chan	32,368	40.0	−14.4
United Liberal Democrats	Kim Kyoung-hwan	3,341	4.1	−2.6
Korean New Party of Hope	Bang Se-hyun	1,430	1.8	new
Democratic Labor	Yang Yeon-soo	1,408	1.7	new
Youth Progressive	Choi Hyeok	1,141	1.4	new
Democratic People's	Yeo Ik-koo	879	1.1	new
Independent	Seo Kyung-won	768	0.9	new
Republican	Kang Jong-won	176	0.2	new
Rejected ballots		817	–	–
Turnout		81,806	57.6	−8.6
Registered electors		142,070		
Grand National gain from Millennium Democratic		Swing		

=== 1998 (by-election) ===
By-election 1998: Jongno
Party	Candidate	Votes	%	±%
National Congress	Roh Moo-hyun	26,251	54.4	+20.8
Grand National	Jeong In-bong	20,993	43.5	+2.5
Independent	Han Seok-bong	974	2.0	new
Rejected ballots		475	–	–
Turnout		48,693	33.7	
Registered electors		144,375		
National Congress gain from Grand National		Swing		

=== 1996 ===
Legislative Election 1996: Jongno
Party	Candidate	Votes	%	±%
New Korea	Lee Myung-bak	40,230	41.0	+5.5
National Congress	Lee Jong-chan	32,918	33.6	−1.9
United Democratic	Roh Moo-hyun	17,330	17.7	new
United Liberal Democrats	Kim Eul-dong	6,602	6.7	new
Independent	Bang Se-hyun	462	0.5	new
Independent	Lee Jeong-nam	253	0.2	new
Independent	Kim Yeon-soo	129	0.1	new
21st century Handok	Park Jong-gu	118	0.1	new
Korea Democratic	Park Jong-gu	63	0.1	new
Rejected ballots		1,260	–	–
Turnout		99,365	66.2	−4.6
Registered electors		150,189		
New Korea hold		Swing		

=== 1992 ===
Legislative Election 1992: Jongno
Party	Candidate	Votes	%	±%
Democratic Liberal	Lee Jong-chan	41,208	35.5	−2.5
Democratic	Kim Kyung-jae	29,820	25.7	new
Reunification National Party	Lee Nae-heun	28,336	24.4	new
Independent	Jeong In-bong	15,127	13.0	new
New Political Reform	Sim Jae-seop	839	0.7	new
Independent	Shin Doo-wan	418	0.4	new
Independent	Yun In-shik	409	0.4	new
Rejected ballots		49,720	–	–
Turnout		117,403	70.8	
Registered electors		165,877		
Democratic Liberal hold		Swing		

=== 1988 ===
Legislative Election 1988: Jongno
Party	Candidate	Votes	%	±%
Democratic Justice	Lee Jong-chan	46,534	38.0	new
Reunification Democratic	Kim Myung-yoon	44,488	36.3	new
New Democratic Republican	Jeong In-bong	15,139	12.3	new
One National Democratic	Je Jeong-gu	15,031	12.3	new
Reunification Korea	Kim Kyung-min	683	0.6	new
Social Democratic	Han Sang-pil	418	0.3	new
Our Justice	Cha Jang-ryang	305	0.2	new
Democratic Justice win (new seat)				

== See also ==
- List of constituencies of the National Assembly of South Korea
