= First Lady of South Korea =

Hostess of the presidential residence

- 대한민국 대통령 배우자 (Hangul) 大韓民國 大統領 配偶者 (Hanja)
- Emblem of South Korea

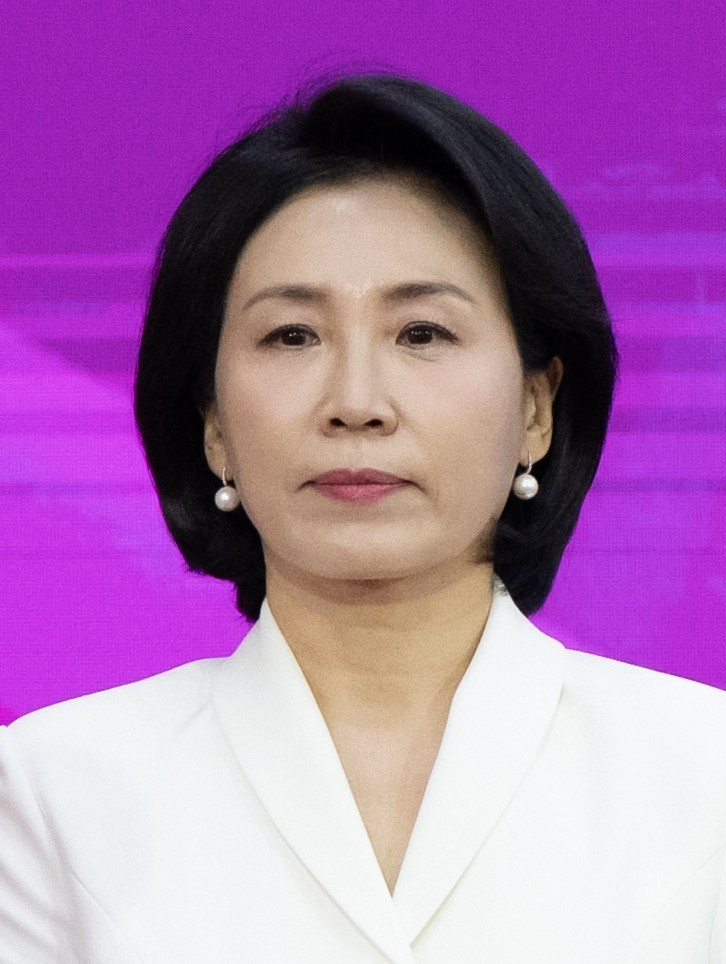
- Current; Kim Hea Kyung since 4 June 2025
- Style: Yeosa (여사, 女史, "Madam")
- Residence: Blue House
- Inaugural holder: Francesca Donner
- Formation: 24 July 1948; 78 years ago
- Website: www.president.go.kr

The first lady of the Republic of Korea (Korean: 대한민국 대통령 배우자), commonly known as the first lady of South Korea, is the title held by the hostess of the presidential residence, usually the wife of the president of South Korea.

The position of first lady is currently held by Kim Hea Kyung, as president Lee Jae-myung's wife.

== History ==
Austrian Francesca Donner was the inaugural first lady of South Korea from 1948 to 1960, as the wife of Rhee Syngman.

The official appearances, schedule, correspondence and attire of the first lady is managed by a dedicated secretariat, called je2 busoksil ("2nd secretariat"). It was established in 1972 to support Park Chung Hee's wife, Yuk Young-soo. After Yuk died, Park's daughter, Park Geun-hye, assumed the duties of the first lady. Park Geun-hye later became president herself, making her the first and only female president of South Korea, However, as she was never married while in office, there has yet to be a first gentleman of Korea. The secretariat had no function in this period.

In 2022, the secretariat was briefly abolished after Yoon Suk Yeol's wife, Kim Keon Hee was embroiled in scandals, but was reestablished in 2024. There are 5 to 10 people working in the first lady's secretariat.

In the history of South Korea, Yuk Young-soo was the first first lady, who was assassinated. In 1974, a North Korean agent shot her, aiming at her husband. Kim Dae-jung's wife, Lee Hee-ho was the first first lady to make overseas trips on her own, and representer the president at the United Nations' extraordinary general meeting on children's issues.

The official form of address of the South Korean first lady is Yeosa (여사), meaning "Madam". Previously they were addressed as Yeongbuin (영부인, "gentleman's wife"; "first lady"). Lee Hee-ho requested at the end of the 1990s to be changed to Yeosa, as the women's rights activist first lady thought she would rather be herself first and only then the "president's wife".

== List ==
President No.	Picture	Name	Tenure	Age at the start of tenure	President (Husband, unless noted)
1		Franziska Donner (프란체스카 도너); Birth country: Austria-Hungary; June 15, 1900 – March 19, 1992 (aged 91)	August 15, 1948 – April 26, 1960	48 years, 61 days	Syngman Rhee m. October 8, 1934
2		Franziska Donner (프란체스카 도너); Birth country: Austria-Hungary; June 15, 1900 – March 19, 1992 (aged 91)	August 15, 1948 – April 26, 1960	48 years, 61 days	Syngman Rhee m. October 8, 1934
3		Franziska Donner (프란체스카 도너); Birth country: Austria-Hungary; June 15, 1900 – March 19, 1992 (aged 91)	August 15, 1948 – April 26, 1960	48 years, 61 days	Syngman Rhee m. October 8, 1934
4		Gong Deok-gwi (공덕귀; 孔德貴); April 21, 1911 – November 24, 1997 (aged 86)	August 13, 1960 – March 23, 1962	49 years, 114 days	Yun Posun m. January 6, 1949
5		Yuk Young-soo (육영수; 陸英修); November 29, 1925 – August 15, 1974 (aged 48)	December 17, 1963 – August 15, 1974	38 years, 18 days	Park Chung Hee m. December 12, 1950
6		Yuk Young-soo (육영수; 陸英修); November 29, 1925 – August 15, 1974 (aged 48)	December 17, 1963 – August 15, 1974	38 years, 18 days	Park Chung Hee m. December 12, 1950
7		Yuk Young-soo (육영수; 陸英修); November 29, 1925 – August 15, 1974 (aged 48)	December 17, 1963 – August 15, 1974	38 years, 18 days	Park Chung Hee m. December 12, 1950
8		Yuk Young-soo (육영수; 陸英修); November 29, 1925 – August 15, 1974 (aged 48)	December 17, 1963 – August 15, 1974	38 years, 18 days	Park Chung Hee m. December 12, 1950
8		Park Geun Hye (Note: Park Geun-hye is the daughter of Park Chung Hee, and took over as First Lady following the murder of her mother, Yuk Young-soo.) (박근혜; 朴槿惠); Born February 2, 1952 (age 74)	August 16, 1974 – October 26, 1979	22 years, 195 days	Park Chung Hee (daughter)
9		Park Geun Hye (박근혜; 朴槿惠); Born February 2, 1952 (age 74)	August 16, 1974 – October 26, 1979	22 years, 195 days	Park Chung Hee (daughter)
10		Hong Gi (홍기; 洪基); March 3, 1916 – July 20, 2004 (aged 88)	December 6, 1979 – August 15, 1980	63 years, 278 days	Choi Kyu-hah m. November 1935
11		Lee Soon-ja (이순자; 李順子); Born March 24, 1939 (age 87)	September 1, 1980 – February 24, 1988	41 years, 161 days	Chun Doo-hwan m. January 24, 1959
12		Lee Soon-ja (이순자; 李順子); Born March 24, 1939 (age 87)	September 1, 1980 – February 24, 1988	41 years, 161 days	Chun Doo-hwan m. January 24, 1959
13		Kim Ok-suk (김옥숙; 金玉淑); Born September 8, 1935 (age 91)	February 25, 1988 – February 24, 1993	52 years, 198 days	Roh Tae-woo m. May 31, 1959
14		Son Myung-soon (손명순; 孫命順); January 16, 1929 – March 7, 2024 (aged 95)	February 25, 1993 – February 24, 1998	64 years, 40 days	Kim Young-sam m. March 6, 1951
15		Lee Hee-ho (이희호; 李姬鎬); September 21, 1922 – June 10, 2019 (aged 96)	February 25, 1998 – February 24, 2003	75 years, 157 days	Kim Dae-jung m. May 10, 1962
16		Kwon Yang-sook (권양숙; 權良淑); Born December 23, 1947 (age 78)	February 25, 2003 – 12 March 2004	55 years, 64 days	Roh Moo-hyun m. January 29, 1973
–		Cho Hyun-sook (조현숙; 趙賢淑); 1938 – September 29, 2021 (aged 83)	12 March 2004 – 14 May 2004		Go Kun m. 1960 (acting)
16		Kwon Yang-sook (권양숙; 權良淑); Born December 23, 1947 (age 78)	14 May 2004 – February 24, 2008	56 years, 143 days	Roh Moo-hyun m. January 29, 1973
17		Kim Yoon-ok (김윤옥; 金潤玉); Born March 26, 1947 (age 79)	February 25, 2008 – February 24, 2013	60 years, 336 days	Lee Myung-bak m. December 19, 1970
18	Vacant (Note: The President at the time, Park Geun-hye, was single, having never married.)		February 25, 2013 – March 10, 2017		Park Geun-hye
–		Choi Ji-young (최지영); Born 1963	9 December 2016 – 10 May 2017		Hwang Kyo-ahn (Acting)
19		Kim Jung-sook (김정숙; 金正淑); Born November 15, 1954 (age 72)	May 10, 2017 – May 9, 2022	62 years, 176 days	Moon Jae-in m. 1981
20		Kim Keon Hee (김건희; 金建希); Born September 2, 1972 (age 54)	May 10, 2022 – 4 April 2025 (Note: Husband suspended by the National Assembly on 14 December 2024)	49 years, 250 days	Yoon Suk Yeol m. March 11, 2012
–		Choi Ah-young (최아영; 崔娥英); Born 1948 (age 77–78)	14 December 2024 – 27 December 2024		Han Duck-soo (acting)
–		Choi Jeong-seon (최정선); Unknown	27 December 2024 – 24 March 2025		Choi Sang-mok (acting)
–		Choi Ah-young (최아영; 崔娥英); Born 1948 (age 77–78)	24 March 2025 – 1 May 2025		Han Duck-soo (acting)
–		Park Eun-jin (박은진); Born 1961/2?	2 May 2025 – 4 June 2025		Lee Ju-ho (acting)
21		Kim Hea Kyung (김혜경; 金惠京); Born September 12, 1966 (age 60)	4 June 2025 –	58 years, 265 days	Lee Jae-myung m. March 30, 1991

== See also ==
- First lady
- First Lady of North Korea
- President of South Korea
- List of presidents of South Korea
