= Kwon Yang-sook =

First Lady of South Korea from 2003 to 2008

- 권양숙
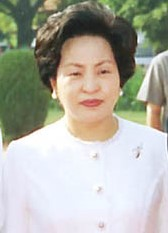
- Yang-sook in 2004

First Lady of South Korea
- In role 25 February 2003 – 24 February 2008
- President: Roh Moo-hyun
- Preceded by: Lee Hee-ho
- Succeeded by: Kim Yoon-ok

Personal details
- Born: December 23, 1947 (age 78) Masan, South Gyeongsang, southern Korea
- Spouse: Roh Moo-hyun (m. 1973; died 2009)
- Relations: Kwak Sang-eon (son-in-law)
- Children: Roh Geon-ho; Roh Jeong-yeon
- Education: Hoonsung Girls' Commercial High School (dropped out)
- Awards: Order of the White Eagle (Poland)

Korean name
- Hangul: 권양숙
- Hanja: 權良淑
- RR: Gwon Yangsuk
- MR: Kwŏn Yangsuk

Dharma name
- Hangul: 대덕화
- Hanja: 大德華
- RR: Daedeokhwa
- MR: Taedŏkhwa

Kwon Yang-sook (Korean: 권양숙; pronounced [kwʌn jaŋ.suk]; born December 23, 1947) was the First Lady of South Korea from 2003 to 2008. She is the widow of the ninth president of South Korea, Roh Moo-hyun, who committed suicide on May 23, 2009.

== Career ==
She is a Buddhist, with the Dharma name Daedeokhwa, and won support from the Buddhist community during her husband's presidential campaign.

After Roh's term ended, Kwon was embroiled in a bribery scandal involving her husband. According to Roh's website, Kwon borrowed $1 million from Park Yeon-Cha, CEO of Taekwang Industry, to repay a personal debt.

== Impostor ==
In November 2018, a woman falsely claiming to be Kwon Yang-sook convinced the mayor of Gwanju at the time, Yoon Jang-hyun, to transfer her 450 million won. According to reports, the impostor claimed that she needed the requested money for her daughter and would pay it back hastily.

== Gallery ==
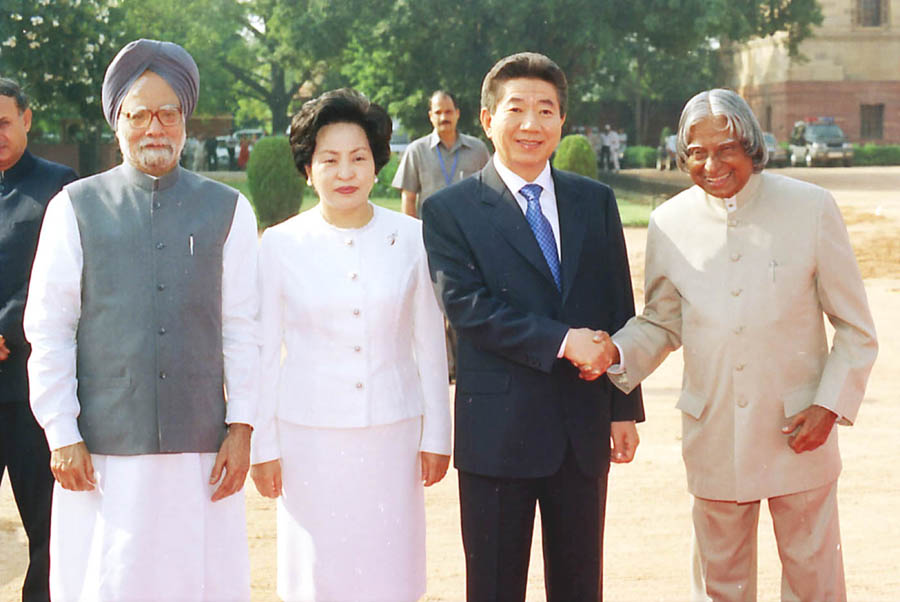
Kwon in India with Roh Moo-hyun, Manmohan Singh, and A.P.J Abdul Kalam in 2004

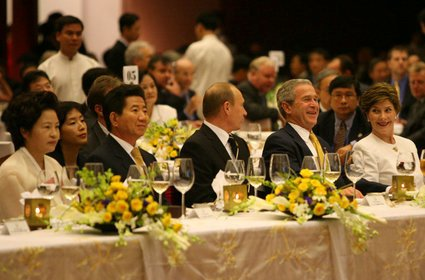
Kwon and Roh Moo-hyun at the 2006 APEC gala dinner with President Vladimir Putin of Russia (centre) and George W. Bush and Laura Bush (right)

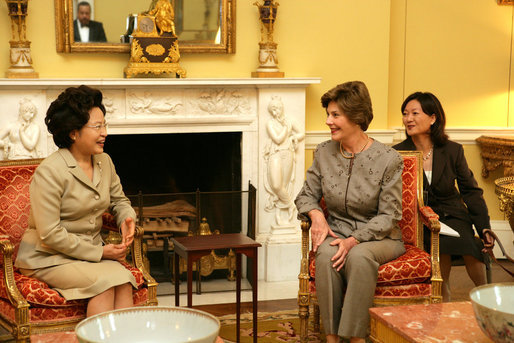
Kwon Yang-suk (left) with U.S. First Lady Laura Bush

Honorary titles
Preceded by Lee Hee-ho	First Lady of South Korea; 2003–2008	Succeeded by Kim Yoon-ok
