= Gong Deok-gwi =

1960–1962 First Lady of South Korea

- State Council
- Gong Deok-gwi in 1960

First Lady of South Korea
- Reign: 13 August 1960 – 23 March 1962
- Predecessor: Franziska Donner
- Successor: Yuk Young-soo
- Born: April 21, 1911; Tongyeong, Keishōnan Province Korea, Empire of Japan
- Died: November 24, 1997 (aged 86); Jongno District, Seoul, South Korea
- Burial: Chungcheongnam-do, South Korea
- Spouse: Yun Po-sun (m. 1949)
- Education: Kyoritsu Women's Theological Seminary
- Father: Gong Do-bin
- Mother: Bang Mal-seon

Korean name
- Hangul: 공덕귀
- Hanja: 孔德貴
- RR: Gong Deokgwi
- MR: Kong Tŏkkwi

Gong Deok-gwi (Korean: 공덕귀; April 21, 1911 – November 24, 1997) was the wife of Yun Po-sun and the second First Lady of South Korea from 1960 to 1962.

Honorary titles
Preceded by Franziska Donner	First Lady of South Korea; 1960 – 1962	Succeeded by Yuk Young-soo
