= Kim Keon Hee =

First Lady of South Korea from 2022 to 2025

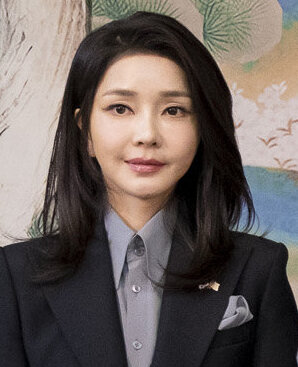
- Kim in 2023

First Lady of South Korea
- In role 10 May 2022 – 4 April 2025
- President: Yoon Suk Yeol
- Preceded by: Kim Jung-sook
- Succeeded by: Choi Ah-young (acting); Choi Jeong-seon (acting); Choi Ah-young (acting); Park Eun-jin (acting); Kim Hea Kyung

Personal details
- Born: Kim Myung-shin; 2 September 1972 (age 54) Yangpyeong County, South Korea
- Spouse: Yoon Suk Yeol (m. 2012)
- Parents: Yoon Ki Joong (in-law) (father); Choi Eun-sun (mother)
- Occupation: Businesswoman
- Criminal information
- Convictions: 3 counts (Note: Bribery; Stock manipulation; Influence peddling under Aggravated Punishment of Specific Crimes)
- Penalty: Bribery and stock manipulation: Four years imprisonment, fine of ₩50 million and forfeiture of ₩20 million; Influence peddling (acceptance of luxury goods for political favours): Seven years imprisonment and fine of ₩64.8 million

Details
- Date apprehended: 12 August 2025
- Imprisoned at: Seoul Detention Center

Korean name
- Hangul: 김건희
- Hanja: 金建希
- RR: Gim Geonhui
- MR: Kim Kŏnhŭi

Former name
- Hangul: 김명신
- RR: Gim Myeongsin
- MR: Kim Myŏngsin

Kim Keon Hee (Korean: 김건희; born Kim Myung-shin; 2 September 1972) is a South Korean businesswoman who served as the first lady of South Korea from 2022 to 2025, as the wife of Yoon Suk Yeol, the 13th president of South Korea. From 2009 to 2022, she was the founder, president and chief executive officer of Covana Contents, an art exhibition company that closed down shortly after her husband took office.

Born in Yangpyeong County, Kim graduated from Kyonggi University in 1996. In 2012, she married Yoon Suk Yeol, the then-prosecutor in Supreme Prosecutors' Office. Since the 2022 presidential election, Kim has been the subject of several allegations of misconduct, including bribery, as well as falsification of academic and financial reports.

On 28 January 2026, Kim was sentenced to 20 months in prison for bribery, but was acquitted on two other accusations of stock manipulation and political funding law violation with the judge citing a lack of evidence regarding her involvement. However, after she appealed the verdict, on 28 April 2026 the appeals court found her guilty of Stock manipulation, increasing her sentence to four years imprisonment, imposing a fine of 50 million won, the confiscation of her necklace and a forfeit of around 20 million won, overturning the lower court's decision.

== Early life and education ==
Kim was born Kim Myung-shin (김명신) on 2 September 1972 in Yangpyeong, Gyeonggi Province, South Korea. In 2008, she legally changed her name to her current name. Her father died when she was in middle school.

She attended Myungil Girls' High School before graduating from Kyonggi University with an arts degree.

== Career ==
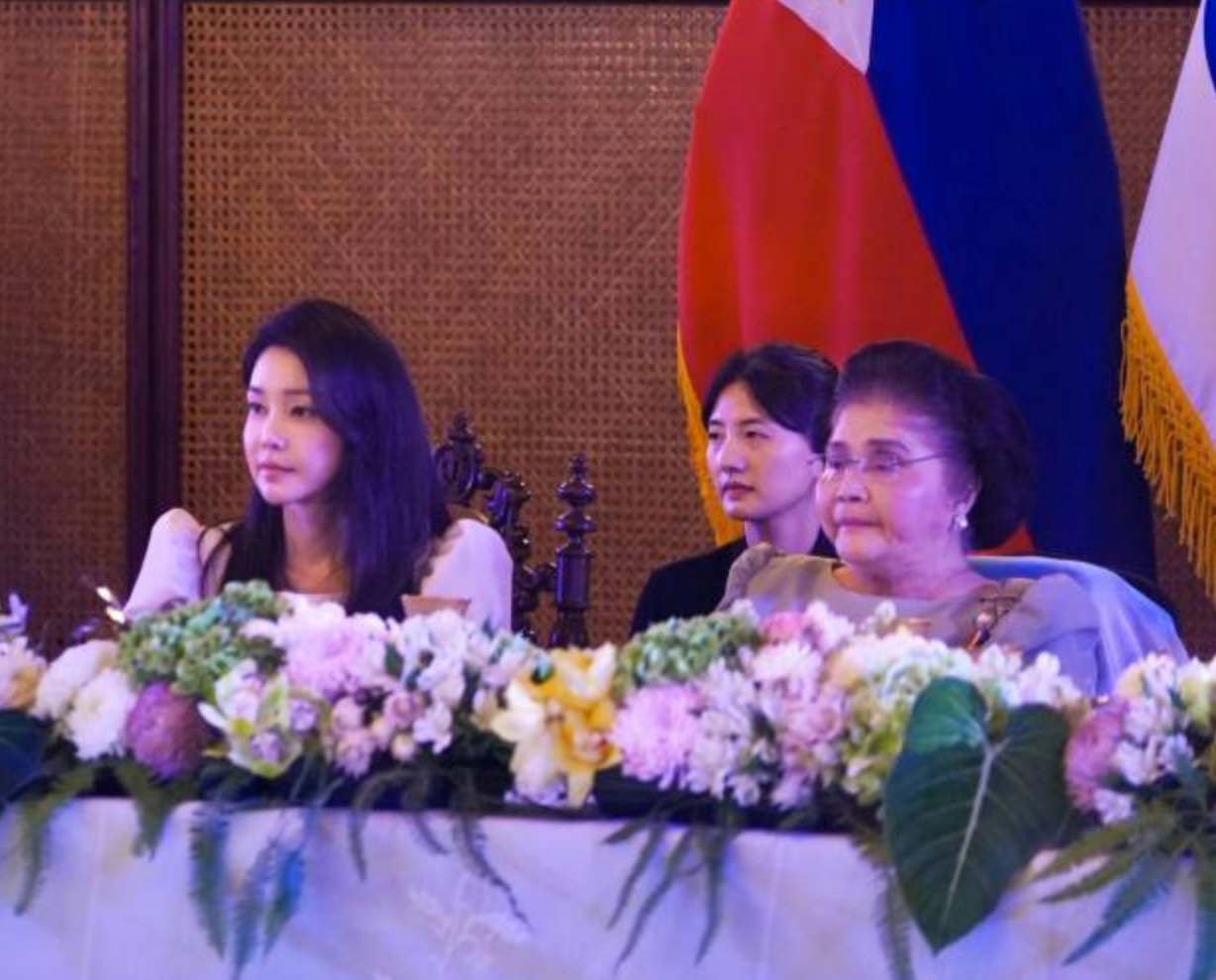
Kim with former Philippine first lady Imelda Marcos in 2024

In 2009, Kim established Covana Contents, a company that specializes in art exhibitions, and has been serving as the chief executive officer and president of the company since its founding until finally closed down around May 2022, shortly after her husband assumes his presidency.

=== Allegations of financial misconduct ===
In 2019, the media reported that she had allegedly evaded paying taxes. Kim has been investigated for allegedly taking kickbacks for hosting art exhibitions.

In 2022, the opposition Democratic Party accused Kim and her family of manipulating the stock price of an auto dealership. She is also accused of allegedly breaching anti-corruption laws by accepting a US$2,200 Dior handbag as a gift, and of interference in elections.

In 2023, courts found that Kim had entrusted her bank accounts to scammers who manipulated the stock price of the Deutsch Motors automotive import company. Although other people who lent out their accounts in this way were convicted of aiding and abetting the scheme, Kim was cleared of allegations by her husband's justice department.

On 20 March 2025, the National Assembly passed a bill to have a permanent special prosecutor investigate Kim on these cases.

=== Academic falsification ===
In 2021, there were reports that Kim had inflated her résumé with connections to the New York University Stern School of Business. At a press conference, she later publicly apologized and promised only "to focus on the role as Yoon's spouse even if Yoon should be elected." Following her promise, Yoon included abolition of the Office of the First Lady within the Office of the President in his campaign promise.

Kim was also accused of plagiarism in her academic writings. Rival parties in South Korea held different opinions on the issue and accused each other of being motivated by politics. In August 2022, Kookmin University, where Kim obtained a PhD, said it found no sign of misconduct. The statement sparked a strong reaction from the university community, and a panel of sixteen professors across academia released their own findings to support allegations of Kim's plagiarism during her master's study at Sookmyung Women's University and her doctoral study at Kookmin. In December 2024, a preliminary internal review from Sookmyung Women's University concluded that she had indeed plagiarized her 1999 master's thesis at the university. Kim was given until the end of January 2025 to dispute the decision. Kim did not dispute the decision before the deadline expired. On 24 June 2025, Sookmyung Women's University announced that they would revoke Kim's degree. On 21 July, Kookmin University also revoked her doctoral degree. On 4 September, her teaching license was revoked by the Seoul Metropolitan Office of Education.

=== Allegations of martial law association ===
After Yoon Suk Yeol was arrested on 15 January, Kim allegedly berated the Presidential Security Service for not shooting at police officers. She also supposedly expressed feelings of committing a murder–suicide against DPK leader Lee Jae-myung.

On 17 February, a criminal investigation into Kim was started for alleged involvement in the 2024 martial law declaration to cover up election interference.

=== Arrest and imprisonment ===
On 12 August 2025, the Seoul Central District Court issued an arrest warrant for Kim. She was then jailed on various graft charges which included bribery, stock fraud and meddling in the selection of a candidate, including manipulating stock prices, accepting luxury gifts such as Chanel bags, a diamond necklace, and a high-value Van Cleef pendant. She was also accused of improperly influencing candidate lists for the People Power Party. The court justified the decision of arrest by citing concerns that she could destroy or tamper with evidence. She was sent to a solitary cell at Seoul Nambu Detention Center.

On 28 January 2026, Kim was sentenced to 20 months of imprisonment for bribery. She was acquitted of charges related to alleged stock price manipulation and political funding law violations. Presiding judge Woo In-seong of the Seoul Central District Court cited a lack of evidence indicating her complicity in the manipulation.

After Kim appealed her sentence with the Seoul High Court, the court overturned the lower court acquittal in the stock manipulation case. On 28 April 2026, she was found guilty of stock manipulation and her sentence was increased to four years imprisonment, a fine of 50 million won, the confiscation of her necklace and a forfeit of around 20 million won. The appellate court also found Kim guilty on all counts involving two Chanel handbags, ginseng extract tea and a diamond necklace from former Unification Church official Yun Young-ho.

On 26 June 2026, the Seoul Central District Court sentenced Kim to seven years in prison after finding her guilty of accepting luxury gifts in exchange for helping secure government and political appointments for associates of the gift-givers. The gifts were reported to have included high-end jewellery, including a Van Cleef & Arpels necklace and Graff earrings. The court also ordered the confiscation of 64.8 million won. On 22 September 2026, a South Korean appeals court reduced the prison sentence from seven to five years.

== Personal life ==
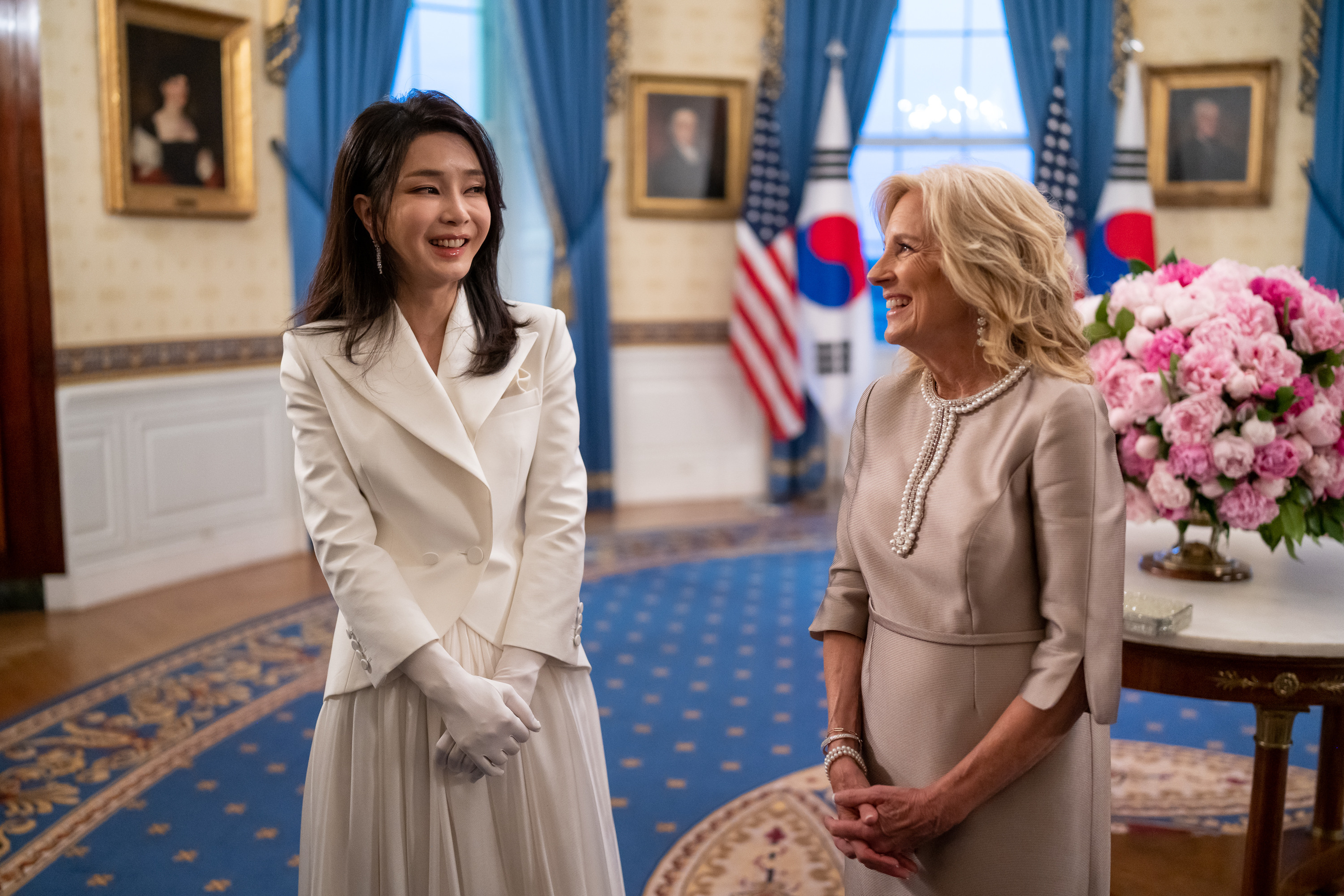
Kim with U.S. First Lady Jill Biden in 2023

Kim's mother, Choi Eun-sun, was tried and acquitted on charges of operating an elderly care hospital without a medical license from 2013 to 2015. In July 2023, she was sentenced to one year in prison for real estate fraud. She was paroled in May 2024.

Kim married Yoon Suk Yeol in 2012. On 10 March 2022, upon her husband's election as president-elect of South Korea, Kim stated that she preferred the term 'President's Spouse' to 'First Lady'.

Kim and Yoon own six dogs and five cats. Among their pets were two Turkmen shepherd puppies gifted by Turkmenistan's President Gurbanguly Berdimuhamedow during their visit in June 2024. Initially raised at the presidential residence, the Turkmen puppies were transferred to the Seoul Grand Park Zoo in November 2024 for safety reasons due to their size.

On 17 January 2025, several officials at the presidential residence in Hannam-dong expressed concerns about Kim's health, describing her as "looking worryingly emaciated". These officials noted that Kim had turned "so thin that it worries [them]. She was completely skinny". Kim was hospitalized due to her deteriorating health in June 2025, being released on 27 June 2025.

== Honours ==
- Poland: Grand Cross of the Order of Merit of the Republic of Poland (13 July 2023)

Honorary titles
Preceded by Kim Jung-sook	First Lady of South Korea; 2022–2025	Succeeded by Choi Ah-young (Acting); Choi Jeong-seon (Acting); Choi Ah-young (Acting); Park Eun-jin (Acting); Kim Hea Kyung
