= Kim Yoon-ok =

First Lady of South Korea from 2008 to 2013

- 김윤옥
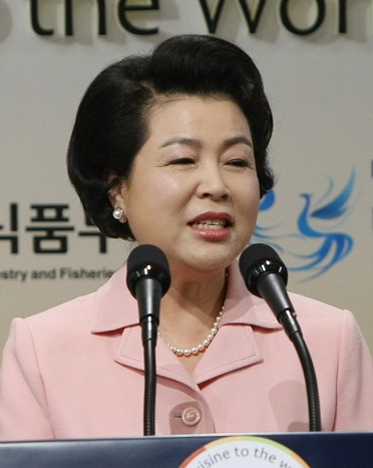
- Kim in 2009

First Lady of South Korea
- In role 25 February 2008 – 24 February 2013
- President: Lee Myung-bak
- Preceded by: Kwon Yang-sook
- Succeeded by: Choi Ji-young (acting) Kim Jung-sook

Personal details
- Born: March 26, 1947 (age 79) Jinju, South Korea
- Spouse: Lee Myung-bak (m. 1970)
- Relations: Lee Sang-deuk (brother-in-law)
- Children: Lee Ju-yeon (b. 1971); Lee Seung-yeon (b. 1973); Lee Su-yeon (b. 1975); Lee Shi-hyeong (b. 1978)
- Education: Ewha Womans University (B.A.)

- Kim Yoon-ok
- Hangul: 김윤옥
- Hanja: 金潤玉
- RR: Gim Yunok
- MR: Kim Yunok

Kim Yoon-ok (Korean: 김윤옥; born March 26, 1947) is a South Korean academic administrator who served as the First Lady of the South Korea from 2008 to 2013 as the wife of president Lee Myung-bak.

== Early life and career ==
Kim graduated from Daegu Girls' High School in 1966 and went on to attend Ewha Womans University, where she graduated in 1970 with a Bachelor of Arts in Health Education and Management. She married Lee Myung-bak on December 19, 1970, with whom she has a son and three daughters. Her family runs a construction company in Daegu.

The family lived in Gahoedong prior to her husband's inauguration.

In 1995, she completed the 1st Advanced Leadership Program for Women at her alma mater. In 1996, she completed the 7th Women's Top Management Program at Yonsei University. In 2001, she completed the Leadership Program of the Women's Academy at Sookmyung Women's University.

In 2011, she became the President of the Alumni Association of the Women's Top Management Program at Yonsei University.

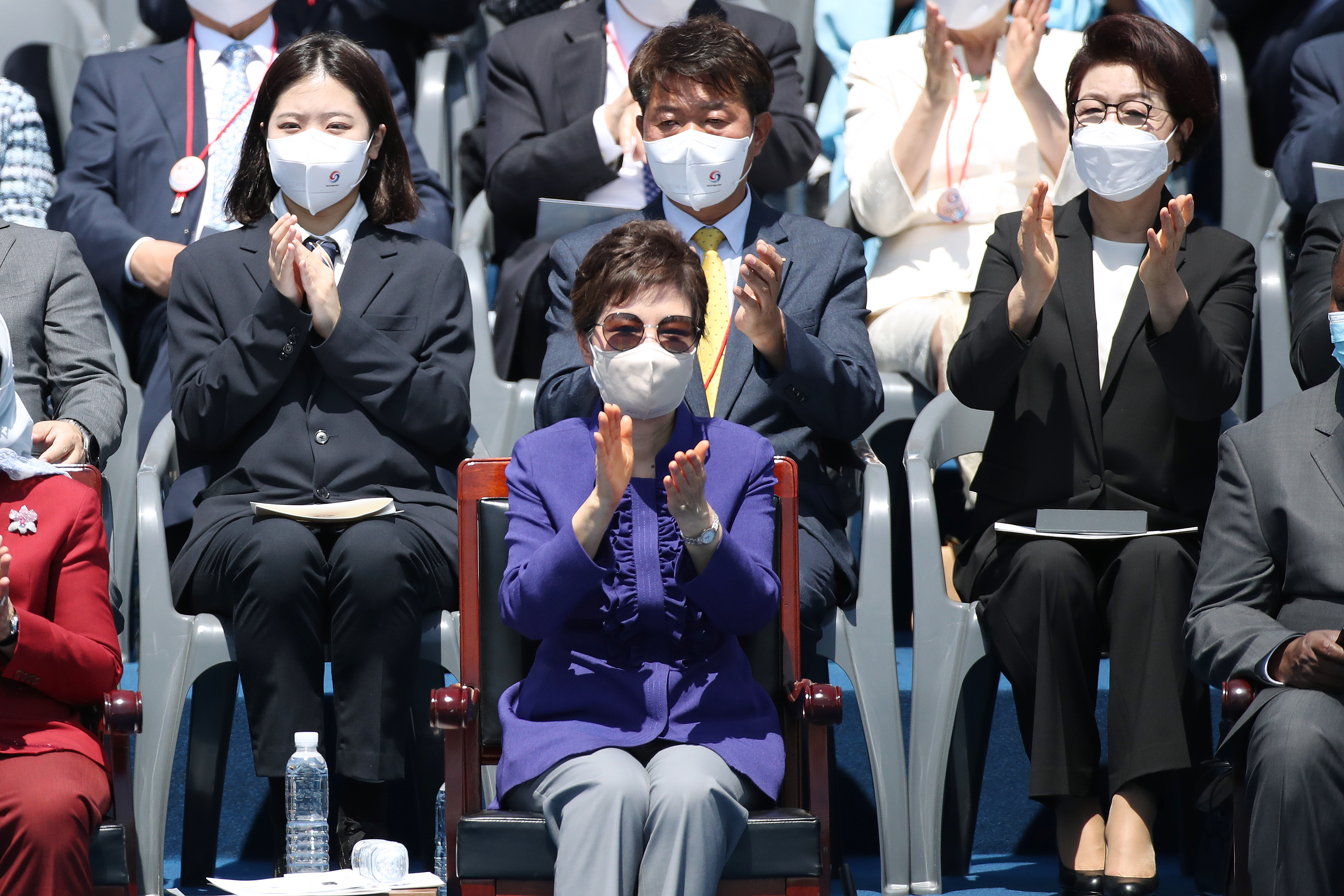
Kim (right) attending Yoon Suk-yeol's inauguration, 10 May 2022.

== Controversy ==
=== Familial corruption ===
- A female relative of the First Lady Kim Yoon-ok, Kim Ok-hui (김옥희), was involved in extorting money in 2008.
- A male relative of Kim Yoon-ok was involved with a lobbyist affiliated with the Jeil Savings Bank. He was later indicted.

Honorary titles
Preceded by Kwon Yang-sook	First Lady of South Korea; 2008–2013	Succeeded by Kim Jung-sook
