= Hong Gi =

1979–1980 First Lady of South Korea

- 홍기
- Official portrait, c. 1979–1980

First Lady of South Korea
- In role 6 December 1979 – 16 August 1980
- President: Choi Kyu-hah
- Preceded by: Park Geun Hye (acting)
- Succeeded by: Jeong Kyung-sook (acting); Lee Soon-ja

Personal details
- Born: 3 March 1916 Judeok-myeon, Chungju, Korea, Empire of Japan
- Died: 20 July 2004 (aged 88) Seoul, South Korea
- Resting place: Seoul National Cemetery, Daejeon National Cemetery
- Spouse: Choi Kyu-hah (m. 1935)
- Children: 3
- Religion: Confucianism

Korean name
- Hangul: 홍기
- Hanja: 洪基
- RR: Hong Gi
- MR: Hong Ki

Hong Gi (Korean: 홍기; 3 March 1916 – 20 July 2004) was the wife of South Korean President Choi Kyu-hah. She was the first lady when Choi was in office, from 1979 to 1980.

== Early life ==
Hong Gi was born in 1916 in Chungju, Chūseihoku Province, Korea, Empire of Japan. She was the eldest of three daughters of Hong Pyongsun (홍병순) and Kwŏn Chaehŭi (권재희). Her grandfather was a reputed traditional scholar, and she attended traditional schools. As a result, she did not attend a modern educational institution.

In 1935, she married Choi Kyu-hah, who was three years younger than her. Between 1935 and 1943, Choi went to study at higher institutions in Japan and Manchukuo. During this time, she lived with her in-laws. In 1964, Choi was appointed as South Korean Ambassador to Malaysia. As a result, she went with her husband to Kuala Lumpur where they lived together. During this time, she learned English while serving as the wife of the ambassador to Malaysia, and happily served as the hostess as the ambassador's wife at the garden reception. On 1967, Choi was appointed as Foreign Minister.

On 1975, Choi was elected as the Prime Minister of South Korea. During this time, Hong took care of the kitchen and laundry herself. Hong's role changed a lot with Choi's position, but she always stayed in the shadows.

== First lady ==
When Choi Kyu-hah became the acting President of South Korea after the assassination of Park Chung Hee in 1979, Hong became the First Lady of South Korea on December 6, 1979. Her tenure as First Lady is the shortest in South Korean history. During her time at the Blue House, Hong only took the lead in supporting nursing homes and orphanages, but refrained from outside activities. Secretaries who have been with her for 20 to 30 years remember her as an adult who is fair, respects principles, and has contributed greatly to helping her husband to be honest. On the other hand, she is evaluated by those around her as having a strong character that is as strong as a man.

She was forced to step down from her position as First Lady in August 1980, after Major General Chun Doo-hwan and close allies within the military staged a coup d'état against Choi's government in December 1979.

== Later life ==
After stepping down as president, Choi and his family lived quietly out of the public eye. Hong Gi suffered from Alzheimer's disease in her later years. As a result, Choi took care of his wife, while at the same time looked after his ailing health also. Choi would often visit Seoul National University Hospital, where she was admitted to. She was the friend of Lee Hee-ho, wife of former South Korean President Kim Dae-jung.

== Death ==
On July 20, 2004, Hong Gi died of Alzheimer's disease at the age of 88. Her remains were initially buried at the Seoul National Cemetery. When her husband died two years later, her remains were relocated and reinterred at a special tomb site alongside Choi in the Daejeon National Cemetery.

== Personal life ==
Hong and Choi Kyu-hah have three children: sons (Choi Yun-hong, Choi Jong-seok) and daughter (Choi Jong-hye).

== Honours ==
- South Korea:
  - Honorary Recipient of the Grand Order of Mugunghwa (1979)

== In popular culture ==
- Korea Gate (1995) - Jun Won-ju

Honorary titles
Preceded by Park Geun-hye (acting)	First Lady of South Korea; 6 December 1979 – 16 August 1980	Succeeded by Lee Soon-ja
