= Enlisted Professional Military Education =

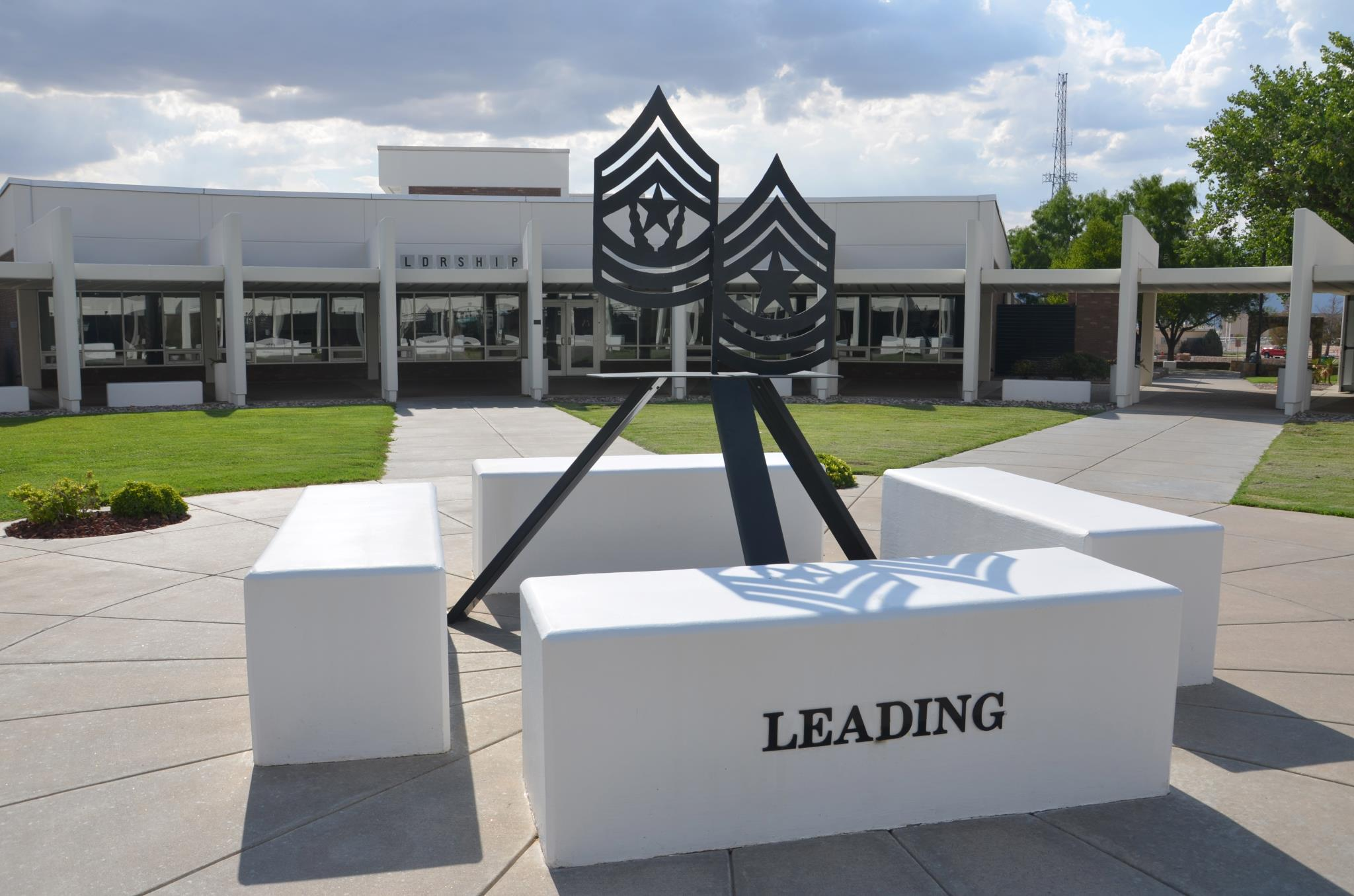
The U.S. Army Sergeants Major Academy center quad

All branches of the United States Armed Forces use the general term Enlisted Professional Military Education (EPME) to describe the formal system of education which each branch provides to its enlisted personnel. Each branch has its own system and sequence of courses, with the overall focus on leadership and management. Education generally increases in intensity and level of knowledge as individuals progress in rank and assume broader leadership roles. EPME is distinct from the technical training which service members receive for their Military Occupational Specialty (MOS), Air Force Specialty Code (AFSC), or Navy rating.

== Joint ==
The DoD operates a Joint Senior Enlisted Professional Military Education (SEJPME) course designed to integrate members from across all branches of service into a unified force. The SEJPME Course is designed to expose enlisted personnel to joint education and prepare them to succeed by improving their ability to operate effectively as part of a future joint force and supervise multiple Service members.

The course is available online as a distance-learning course.

== Air Force ==
Air Force EPME is created and provided through the Thomas N. Barnes Center for Enlisted Education, part of the Air University system, named after the service's fourth Chief Master Sergeant of the Air Force, Thomas N. Barnes, the first African-American to attain the highest enlisted position in any branch of the U.S. Armed Forces.

The principal instructional method for all Air Force EPME is guided discussion, in which students share ideas, experiences, and work together to achieve various educational objectives. Formative evaluations are an integral part of the curriculum and serve as feedback tools for the student and instructor. Summative objective and performance evaluations are used to determine whether the educational requirements outlined in the course are met. All EPME courses include fitness and drill and ceremony components as well as formal lectures and academic research projects.

All Air Force EPME courses have been approved for college credit in the Leadership, Management & Military Science discipline of the service's Community College of the Air Force Associate in Applied Science degree programs.

=== Mission and goal ===
Mission
Provide the continuum of education necessary to inspire and develop enlisted leaders with the moral framework of integrity, service and excellence.

Goal
Expand the leadership ability of enlisted leaders and strengthen their commitment to the profession of arms by integrating sound leadership, communication skills, and military studies principles and concepts throughout the ALS, NCOA, and AFSNCOA curricula.

=== Schools, Programs, and Courses ===
Airman Leadership School (ALS): ALS is an Air Force education program held at base level to prepare senior airmen for positions of greater responsibility. The course teaches leadership skills required of supervisors and reporting officials throughout the Air Force. ALS enhances the development of senior airmen by strengthening their ability to lead, follow, and manage while they gain a broader understanding of the military profession. ALS is attended by Senior Airmen (E-4) and required for promotion to Staff Sergeant (E-5).

Course 15: computer-based training that is a prerequisite for attending NCO Academy.

Non-Commissioned Officer Academy (NCOA): This professional military education course prepares NCOs to be professional, war-fighting Airmen who can lead and manage Air Force units in the employment of air and space power. The principal method of instruction is guided discussion and case studies. This course is designed to develop Airmen into effective mid-level leaders and managers. It is the second PME that enlisted Air Force members encounter. NCOA focuses on leadership abilities, the profession of arms, effective communication, and organizational leadership. NCOA is attended by Technical Sergeants (E-6) and is required for promotion to Master Sergeant (E-7).

Senior Noncommissioned Officer Distance Learning Course (SNCO DLC): Computer-based training that replaced Course 14 on 1 July 2016. Required for promotion eligibility to SMSgt.

Senior Non-Commissioned Officer Academy (SNCOA): SNCOA is an advanced professional military education program that prepares select NCOs for greater responsibilities by expanding their leadership and managerial capabilities and their perspective of the military profession. The curriculum, designed to meet senior NCO needs, consists of lectures and small group work seminars. The principal instructional method is the 12 to 14 member-guided discussions, in which students share ideas and experiences and work collectively to achieve educational objectives. Members of the Academy's faculty and speakers from AU, Headquarters USAF and other commands, and civilian agencies lecture at the Academy. The Academy curriculum is based on the belief that the senior NCOs attending the course bring with them some understanding and competence in all areas of the curriculum.

== Army ==
Basic Leader Course (BLC)
The First Army Leadership School. This one-month school trains E-4 Specialists and Corporals how to lead and includes topics such as: Leadership, Training Management, Map Reading, Land Navigation, Drill and Ceremony, War fighting. E-4 Specialists and Corporals wanting to be E-5 Sergeants are required to take this course prior to being promoted.

In 2016, the Army revised AR 600-8-19 making BLC a prerequisite for pin-on to E-5.

Advanced Leader Course (ALC)
Common Core and MOS Focused. The Advanced Leaders Course Common Core (DL) is designed to enable all promotable SGTs and non-promotable SGTs to perform as squad leaders and supervisors who can visualize, analyze, apply, and adapt to today's Operational Environment (OE). This course produces battle competent NCOs who are qualified squad/section sergeants, team/section leaders, evaluators, counselors, conductors or participants in individual and collective training, and performers/teachers of leader values, attributes, skills, and actions. The course supports the Army Chief of Staff's Training and Leader Development Guidance, Educational Theory, and Learning Environment; thereby producing a more competent and capable leader.

Senior Leader Course (SLC)
Sergeant First Class Training. SLC, an Army branch–specific course, teaches promotable Staff Sergeants (E6) and Sergeants First Class (E7) the leader, technical, and tactical skills required to lead platoons/companies within a career management field.

Master Leader Course (MLC)
This fast-paced course provides promotable Sergeants First Class (E7) and Master Sergeants (E8) the training necessary to lead a company, battery or troop. The course consists of 31 testable self-study at-home lessons and a second resident phase that teaches: training management, unit administration, communicative skills, discipline and morale, logistics and maintenance, tactical operations, physical fitness training.

U.S. Army Sergeants Major Academy (USASMA)
For soldiers lucky enough to be selected for E-9 Sergeant Major, they will attend this 6-month world premiere education institution for top non-commissioned officers at Fort Bliss, TX. The value of this training lies in its small group interaction as its method of instruction.

Command Sergeants Major Course (CSMC)
This is the last and highest leadership training course and it is for Sergeants Major that continue on to be a Command Sergeants Major - the top enlisted soldier in a Battalion-size organization and larger. Major topics included in this fast-paced course are: being the senior enlisted adviser to the commander, working with command and staff officers, how to assign and utilize soldiers, caring for soldiers and families.

== Coast Guard ==
Coast Guard EPME is a continuum of leadership training that provides enlisted members with a solid foundation for a successful Coast Guard career. Students must meet performance requirements, pass an Advancement Qualification Exam (AQE), and pass a service-wide exam. Students must demonstrate mastery of current and next rank leadership requirements before advancing in rank.

There are three levels of Coast Guard EPME:

Apprentice
Required for members to advance to E-3 and E-4.

Journeyman
Required for members to advance to E-5 and E-6.

Master
Required for members to advance to E-7, E-8, and E-9.

== Marine Corps ==
The Marine Corps College of Enlisted Military Education is a part of Marine Corps University and is responsible for the EPME curriculum development and administrative support to Marine Corps Units (Corporals Course) and the Staff Noncommissioned Officers Academies located in Quantico, VA; Camp Pendleton, CA; Twentynine Palms, CA; Camp Lejeune, NC; Kaneohe Bay, HI; and Okinawa, Japan.

=== Mission and goal ===
Mission
The College of Enlisted Military Education provides a continuum of education to improve leadership, sharpen critical and creative thinking skills, and deepen Marines' understanding of warfighting concepts in distributed/joint environments in order to foster ethical, professional leaders who make sound decisions in complex operational situations.
Goal
The Enlisted College's goal is to provide current operational information allowing Marines to contribute their excellence in warfighting and to operate at their specific level of the MAGTF as well as maintain the Marine Corps’ time-honored traditions. It says its approach uses traditional resident courses as well as nontraditional methods such as seminars and interactive nonresident programs.

=== Schools, programs and courses (Staff Noncommissioned Officers Academy) ===
Corporals Course
The Command Sponsored Corporals Course (CSCC) is focused on providing the skills necessary to lead Marines, and is designed to provide the war fighting skills, core values and mindset necessary for effective leadership of a team and subordinate Marines. Upon completion, corporals will have the skills necessary to: clearly articulate one's thoughts in both oral and written communication; understand the standards of leadership traits, principles, and fundamentals; understand the noncommissioned officer (NCO) mindset of “doing instead of knowing;” execute and apply tactical measures at the team level; conduct training for Marines in the MCCS Program and military occupation specialty training; understand Operational Risk Management and apply risk management principles; understand career progression; and conduct personal/personnel management for the team.
Sergeants School
At this level, PME consists of a building block approach; each course builds on the previous course with minimal overlap. The DEPs are designed as a PME perquisite to attend the resident Academies. Sergeants are required to complete the SGTDEP (nonresident) course. The SGTDEP is a prerequisite for the SNCOA Sergeants School, meaning it must be completed prior to attending the SNCOA Sergeants School. The nonresident and resident courses are focused on providing the skills necessary for sergeants to plan and conduct training for their Marines and are designed to provide the war fighting skills, core values and mindset necessary for effective leadership of a squad size unit and subordinate leaders. Upon completion, sergeants will have the skills necessary to clearly articulate thoughts in both oral and written communication; lead Marines through effective leadership; implement tactical measures at the squad/platoon level; understand basic national military capabilities; conduct training with the MCCS Program; and understand career progression.
Career School
Staff sergeants are required to complete the SNCOCDEP (nonresident) course. The SNCOCDEP is a prerequisite for the SNCOA Career School meaning it must be completed prior to attending the SNCOA Career School. The SNCOCDEP/SNCOA Career School courses are focused on providing the skills necessary for the staff sergeant to act as a “problem solver” and are designed to supply the skills necessary to provide leadership at the platoon level, influence company grade officers, lead and develop subordinate leaders in war fighting, core values, and preserve time-honored traditions. Upon completion, staff sergeants will have the skills necessary to clearly articulate thoughts in both oral and written communication; understand and model the mindset of a SNCO; develop and mentor character-based leadership in NCOs (foster ethical leadership); advise the commander/officer in charge (OIC) on operational requirements; understand the joint environment; assist the unit commander in obtaining training goals, and effectively manage personnel and assets.
Advanced School
Gunnery sergeants, regardless of future selection, are required to complete the SNCOADEP (nonresident) and attend and complete the SNCOA Advanced School (resident). The SNCOADEP is a prerequisite for the SNCOA Advanced School, meaning it must be completed prior to attending the SNCOA Advanced School. The SNCOADEP and the SNCOA Advanced School are focused on providing the skills necessary for the gunnery sergeant to act as a “decision maker” and are designed to provide the skills necessary for senior leadership in a company level organization independently supervise processes and procedures, influence officers, and function in an operations center. Upon completion, gunnery sergeants will have the skills necessary to clearly articulate thoughts in both oral and written communication; influence command climate; be prepared to act as the senior enlisted advisor; understand the unit training management process and provide the commander input; understand MAGTF operations; understand basic unit deployment concepts, requirements, and methodology; and develop courses of action based on planning guidance.

==== Senior Enlisted Professional Military Education Course ====
Senior Enlisted Professional Military Education (SEPME) is designed to equip Marines in the ranks of master sergeant and first sergeant with critical thinking and adaptability skills necessary to function at the operational and strategic levels of war. Completion of the course equips senior enlisted Marines with demonstrated proficiency in the Marine Corps Planning Process (MCPP), communication and administration. At its highest level, SEPME enhances the senior leader's ability to provide sound recommendations for mission success. SEPME is not a requirement for promotion to either master gunnery sergeant or sergeant major.

1st Sergeants Course
This course prepares recently promoted first sergeants or gunnery sergeants selected for first sergeant for the leadership and administrative challenges a first sergeant faces and facilitates transition to the 8999 MOS. This course provides basic instruction on the duties and responsibilities of a first sergeant, regardless of the Marine's unit. Understanding these duties and responsibilities augments a first sergeant's ability to advise, counsel, and interact with the unit's commander, officers, SNCOs, and enlisted Marines to accomplish the unit's mission. First sergeants must also attend the First Sergeant/Master Sergeant Regional Seminar.
Master Sergeant / 1st Sergeant Seminar
Each regional SNCO Academy conducts an annual First Sergeant/Master Sergeant Regional Seminar. Marines should attend at least one of these seminars during their time in grade as a first sergeant/master sergeant; however, attendance is not a prerequisite for promotion to sergeant major/master gunnery sergeant. The President, MCU and Director, College of Enlisted Military Education, in coordination with the regional SNCO Academy Directors and the Sergeant Major of the Marine Corps, develop the agenda items for these seminars. After regional seminars have been completed, commanders are encouraged to sponsor local SNCO seminars as a means to disseminate the information from the regional seminars.
Master Gunnery Sergeant / Sergeant Major Symposium
The MCU at Quantico hosts an annual symposium for sergeants major/master gunnery sergeants. Marines are required to attend at least one of these symposia during their time in grade as sergeants major/ master gunnery sergeants. The Commandant and the Sergeant Major of the Marine Corps, in coordination with the President, MCU and the Director, College of Enlisted Military Education, develop the agenda items for this symposium.

== Navy ==
The Navy Senior Enlisted Academy (SEA) provides senior enlisted leaders education in communication skills, leadership and management, national security affairs, Navy programs, and physical fitness. Of the 1,200 students in attendance annually, the majority are active duty Navy personnel. Navy Reserve, Air Force, Army, Coast Guard, Marine Corps, and International service members make up the remainder of the student population.

Part of the Navy War College, the Navy Senior Enlisted Academy was established in 1981, and graduation is required before personnel can assume the position of command master chief or chief of the boat.

=== Mission ===
The mission of the Senior Enlisted Academy is to further develop, through education and training, the leadership capabilities of Senior Enlisted to give sound decision support in command, staff, management, and leadership positions in Naval, Joint, and Multinational environments. To provide Senior Enlisted a sound understanding of military strategy and leadership skills; cultivating Leaders who maintain a constant focus on Ethics, Flexibility, and Mission Accomplishment in an ever-changing environment.

=== Course ===
The resident curriculum is a six-week course of instruction, containing 240 academic hours. The blended curriculum includes six-weeks BlackBoard distance learning and a two-week in-house course of instruction. Both formats require completion of Navy Primary PME (approx. 70 hours of online instruction) prior to attending.

== See also ==
- Community College of the Air Force
- Staff College
