= Oh Hee-ok =

Korean independence activist (1926–2024)

- 오희옥
- Born: 1926; Emu Town, Jilin, Republic of China
- Died: November 17, 2024 (aged 98); Seoul, South Korea
- Resting place: Seoul National Cemetery
- Awards: Order of Merit for National Foundation (1990)

Oh Hee-ok (Korean: 오희옥; 1926 – November 17, 2024) was a Korean independence activist, and the last surviving female independence activist recognized by the South Korean government. A member of the Korean Liberation Army and the Korea Independence Party, she resisted the Japanese occupation of Korea while in exile in China.

== Biography ==
Born in Emu Town, Jilin, Republic of China (now in Jiaohe, Jilin, China) in 1926 whilst her family was in exile in Manchuria, she was the daughter of independence activists O Kwangsŏn and Chŏng Hyŏnsuk (정현숙). Her grandfather, O Insu (오인수), was also an independence activist. Oh joined the Korean Liberation Front Youths Mission Corps (한국광복진선청년공작대) in April 1939. She performed some espionage work for them. In January 1941, her group was merged into the Korean Liberation Army. Upon the 1945 liberation of Korea, she was in Chongqing, along with the rest of the Korean Provisional Government.

After the 1950–1953 Korean War, she worked for 38 years as a primary school teacher. She had one son and two daughters.

In 1990, Oh was awarded the Order of Merit for National Foundation from the South Korean government. In 2017, she sang the national anthem at a National Liberation Day of Korea ceremony, which was attended by president Moon Jae-in. In 2021, she became the last surviving female Korean independence activist, after the death of Min Yeong-ju (민영주).

She died on November 17, 2024, at around 3:08 p.m., at Seoul Veterans Health Service Medical Center (서울중앙보훈병원). Coincidentally, she died on Patriotic Martyr's Day, which commemorates Korean independence activists. A memorial ceremony was held for her at Seoul National Cemetery on November 20. The Ministry of Patriots and Veterans Affairs lowered their flags to half mast around the country in her honor. Her remains were interred at that cemetery thereafter.
