= Lee Soon-ja =

1980–1988 First Lady of South Korea

- 이순자
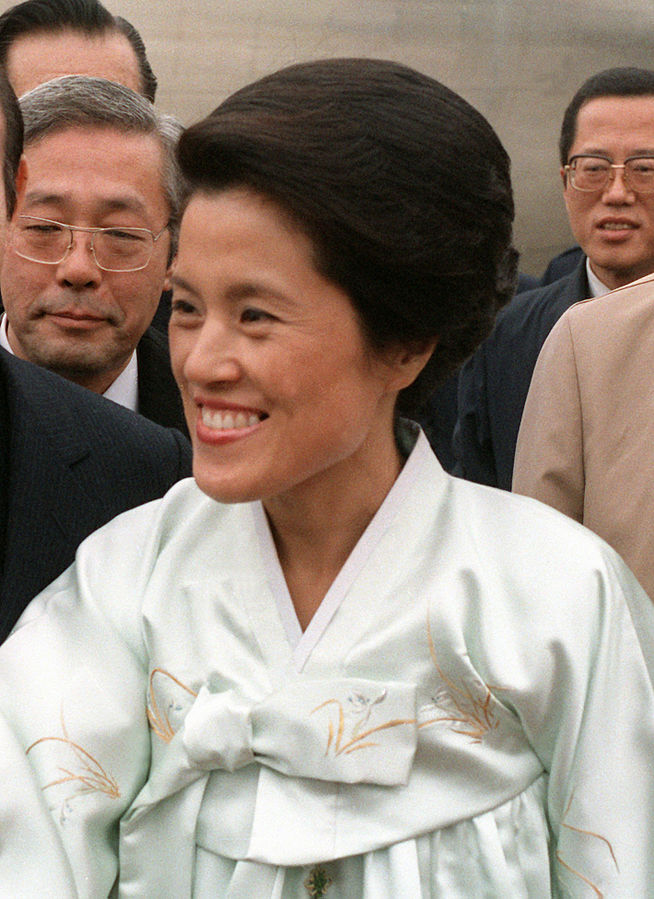
- Lee in 1981

First Lady of South Korea
- In role 1 September 1980 – 24 February 1988 (Note: Although Chun's position became officially known as "President" from 1 September 1980 after an internal election which lacked universal suffrage, Chun rule was a continuance which had already begun since the military Coup d'état of December Twelfth in 1979.)
- President: Chun Doo-hwan
- Preceded by: Jeong Kyung-sook (acting)
- Succeeded by: Kim Ok-suk

Personal details
- Born: 24 March 1939 (age 87) Chōshun, Manchukuo, Empire of Japan
- Spouse: Chun Doo-hwan (m. 1959; died 2021)
- Children: 4
- Education: Ewha Womans University (dropped out)
- Religion: Buddhism (formerly Roman Catholic)

Korean name
- Hangul: 이순자
- Hanja: 李順子
- RR: I Sunja
- MR: I Sunja

Lee Soon-ja (Korean: 이순자; born 24 March 1939) is the widow of South Korean President Chun Doo-hwan. She was the first lady when Chun Doo-hwan was in office, from 1980 to 1988.

== Early life ==
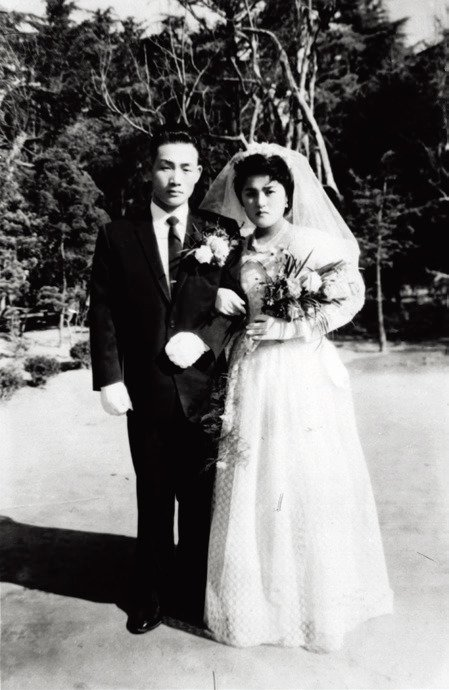
Lee Soon-ja and Chun Doo-hwan during their marriage ceremony (1959)

Lee Soon-ja was born on March 24, 1939, in Chōshun, Manchukuo to Lee Gyu-dong and Lee Bong-nyeon. She is the second daughter of a family with three daughters and one son. Her father was from Seongju County in North Gyeongsang Province, and is the descendant of Lee Jo-yeon, a scholar and writer during the Goryeo period. He was an officer within the Manchukuo Imperial Army.

Following the independence of Korea from the Japanese rule in 1945, the family moved back to the Korean Peninsula. Her father was appointed as an officer in the South Korean Army and worked at the Non-Commissioned Officer Academy. After the death of one of her sisters, Lee played the role of the eldest daughter in the family. During this time, she attended the Jinhae Girls' Middle School in Changwon. Afterward, Lee followed her father to Seoul, where she attended and graduated from Gyeonggi Girls' Middle School and High School.

In 1957, she entered the medical school of Ewha Womans University, but gave up her dream of becoming a doctor and married Chun Doo-hwan, then an army officer on January 24, 1959, at Daegu No.1 auditorium. Initially, Chun Doo-hwan was hesitant to marry her and at that time as Chun was 28 years old and Lee was 20 years old. Because of this, Lee was expelled from Ewha Womans University because the university's academic policy at that time was that enrolled students must be unmarried. Lee later completed a course at the School of Environment in Yonsei University.

While talking to the men under her husband's command in the South Korean Army, Lee stated:

"Life is very short, and the life of military wives is even shorter. You can't make your husband worry about housework in such a short period of time."

== First Lady ==
When Chun Doo-hwan became the 11th President of South Korea in 1980, after ruling the country as a de facto leader from 1979 to 1980, Lee Soon-ja became the First Lady of South Korea on 1 September 1980. During her time as First Lady, Lee accompanied Chun in all public events. In the 1980s, families in South Korea began to switch from black and white television to color television. Through color television, the first lady in her early 40s, dressed in gorgeous costumes and traditional dresses, made Koreans at the time proud. When Chun Doo-hwan was in power, the extravagant behavior of Lee Soon-ja and the financial fraud of her uncle's younger sibling became a social concern and was criticized by the South Korean society. As a result, she was satirized by the society as 'Yeonhui-dong's Red Pants', in reference to the neighborhood where her extravagant house was located.

During her tenure in office, Lee Soon-ja in particular demonstrated interest in educational issues and made quantitative and qualitative contributions to the development of early childhood education and heart surgery among children. She left her position as First Lady after the resignation of Chun Doo-hwan following the June Democracy Movement in 1988.

== Later life ==
After his resignation from the presidency, Chun Doo-hwan fell into disgrace. He and his family were suspected of corruption. On November 23, 1988, Chun and Lee was forced to leave for the Baekdamsa Buddhist monastery, where they spent two years. Lee also received 3 billion won annuity immediately after leaving office and 12 million won of goods every month as a means of pension. After all kinds of her greedy and extravagant behaviors were publicly reported, Koreans have a very negative impression of Lee.

During the process of reviewing the case of Chun Doo-hwan's secret funds, South Korean prosecutors also conducted secret investigations into the possibility of Lee Soon-ja's possession of secret funds, and also inquired a middle-aged man who had served as her fashion designer and consultant. For this reason, Lee lodged a strong protest to the Supreme Prosecutors' Office of the Republic of Korea through her lawyer. The Prosecutors' Office also felt that it was too much to search the couple at the same time, so it decided not to investigate Lee.

On May 11, 2006, Lee was summoned by South Korea's Central Investigation Department on suspicion of managing about 13 billion won of illegal savings in May 2004. Her younger brother was later summoned on similar suspicion. Lee later claimed that the 13 billion won was what she had saved after a hard time, but it was allegedly containing a lot of fraudulent funds and was paid as a total surcharge. At the same time, the family still have to pay a gigantic amount of $370 million, stolen by Chun at one time from the country's budget. Lee and Chun's family are still paying this debt. In July 2013, the South Korean Ministry of Economy and Finance and the Public Prosecutors' Office reported that the Seoul Central District Attorney's Office had seized 3 billion won of personal annuity insurance from Lee. This was the first time that the prosecutor has seized the cash assets of Chun and his family, to collect the payment owed by them.

In 2017, a public opinion survey showed that Lee Soon-ja was the worst first lady in South Korean history. Only 0.2% of the respondents had a positive view of her and 53.1% had a negative view of her.

On January 1, 2019, she generated controversy when she stated that Chun Doo-hwan was 'the father of Korean democracy'. Her statement was criticized by a number of South Korean political parties, with the exception of the conservative opposition Liberty Korea Party.

On November 27, 2021, during the funeral procession of Chun following his death on November 23, Lee issued a brief apology over the "pains and scars" caused by Chun's brutal rule. Her apology did not mention Chun's responsibility of the suppression of Gwangju Uprising in 1980. As a result, civic groups related to the movement, including those of bereaved families, criticized her apology for being vague and incomplete, and said that they wouldn't accept the apology.

== Personal life ==
Lee and Chun Doo-hwan have four children: three sons (Chun Jae-yong, Chun Jae-guk, Chun Jae-man) and daughter (Chun Hyo-sun). Chun Doo-hwan died on November 23, 2021, due to complications of blood cancer.

== Honours ==
- South Korea:
  - Honorary Recipient of the Grand Order of Mugunghwa (1980)
- Malaysia:
  - Honorary Recipient of the Most Exalted Order of the Crown of the Realm (1981)

== In popular culture ==
- 4th Republic (1995) – Lee Sang Sook
- Korea Gate (1995) – Kyeon Mi-ri
- The Age of Three Kims (1998) – Lee Sang Sook
- 5th Republic (2005) – Kim Young-ran

== Gallery ==
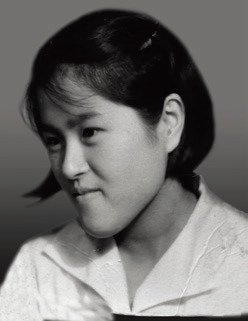
Lee Soon-ja during her youth.

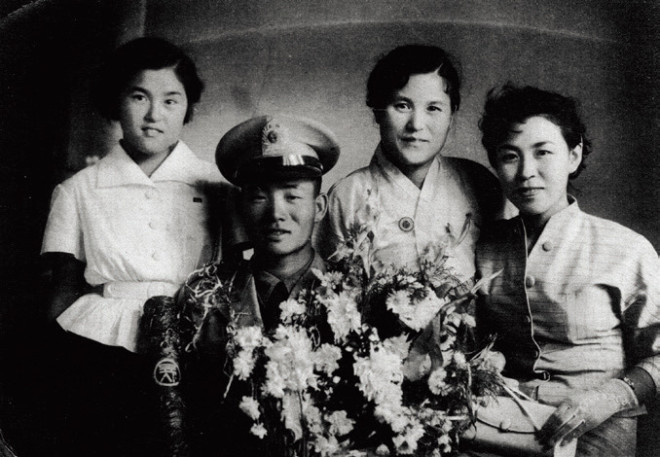
Chun Doo-hwan with Lee Soon-ja (left) and other relatives.

== Notes ==
Honorary titles
Preceded by Hong Gi	First Lady of South Korea; 1 September 1980 – 24 February 1988	Succeeded by Kim Ok-suk
