= Kim Ok-suk =

First Lady of South Korea from 1988 to 1993

Highness Kim Ok-suk
- 김옥숙
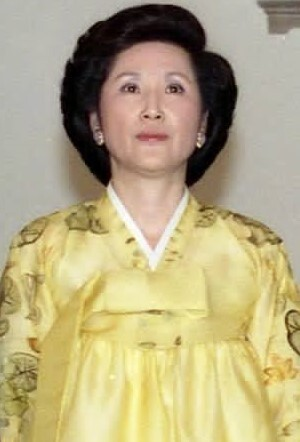

First Lady of South Korea
- In role February 25, 1988 – February 24, 1993
- President: Roh Tae-woo
- Preceded by: Lee Soon-ja
- Succeeded by: Son Myung-soon

Personal details
- Born: September 8, 1935 (age 91) Antoku-men, Seishō-gun, Keishōhoku Province, Korea, Empire of Japan
- Spouse: Roh Tae-woo (m. 1959; died 2021)
- Children: 2
- Education: Kyungpook National University (dropped out)
- Religion: Buddhism → Protestantism → Catholicism (Christian Name: Mary)

Korean name
- Hangul: 김옥숙
- Hanja: 金玉淑
- RR: Gim Oksuk
- MR: Kim Oksuk

Kim Ok-suk (Korean: 김옥숙; born September 8, 1935) is the widow of South Korean President Roh Tae-woo. She was the First Lady when Roh Tae-woo was in office, from 1988 to 1993.

== Early life ==
Kim was born on September 8, 1935, in Antoku-men in Keishōhoku Province to Kim Young-han and Hong Moo-kyung. She is the fourth child of a family with three sons and two daughters. Her older brother Kim Pok-tong, served as a soldier in the South Korean Army and later was a politician. Her sister was the wife of former Minister of Commerce, Industry and Energy Geum Jin-ho.

She attended and graduated from Gyeongbuk Women's High School in 1954. In 1956, she attended the Department of Family Education at Kyungpook National University. On May 31, 1959, she married Roh Tae-woo, then an army officer, at the Daegu Cultural Wedding Hall. As a result of the marriage, she dropped out of the university in her third year.

During the 1987 South Korean presidential election, she attended her husband's election campaigns, but always waved flags or smiled to the crowd. On October 21, 1987, she did not even reveal the fact that she accompanied Roh at an election rally in Daejeon, which gave off a strong feeling that she was promoting the image of an ordinary wife, as a basic strategy to gain electoral votes for her husband.

== First lady ==
When Roh Tae-woo became the 12th President of South Korea in 1988, after his victory in 1987 South Korean presidential elections, Kim became the First Lady of South Korea on February 25, 1988. From the start of her tenure as First Lady, Kim made appearances at public events, such as the opening ceremony of the 1988 Summer Olympics held in Seoul and Pope John Paul II's visit to South Korea in October 1989.

During her tenure at the Blue House, she is considered as the only first lady who spoke in public rarely, and for this reason, Kim received complaints from women rights activists that she neglected social issues that the first lady should be concerned about. However, Kim had formed blood ties with ten households with boys and girls for over 20 years and gave them humane and financial help. During her tenure, she frequently visited large cities such as Seoul and Busan, as well as orphanages and nursing homes located in remote areas of the country.

Kim was an avid follower of fashion and benchmarked former first lady Yuk Young-soo's style to give a gentle and calm public image, and to accentuate her image as an ordinary citizen. It was believed that Kim was originally a very active and an outgoing woman, but due to corruption and extravagant behavior of previous first lady Lee Soon-ja, she decided to maintain reclusiveness with her public image on purpose.

She also participated in the repentance of her husband's actions during the Gwangju Uprising in 1980. Two days after her inauguration, she is seen meditating at a grave in memory of the victims. Although her husband did not apologize at this point for his actions during the uprising, her family, especially Kim, expresses regret, and wishes to repent and apologize to the Korean people, an attitude that contrast to that of the family of President Chun Doo-hwan, who never showed any form of remorse for the suppression of the uprising.

She left her position as First Lady after the election of Kim Young-sam as the 13th President of South Korea on 1993. Initially opposed to Kim Young-sam's policy, she changed her mind during her mandate and tried to persuade those around her to vote for him, in order to better prepare for the transition between her husband's government and the next.

== Later life ==
In his later years, Roh Tae-woo suffered from cerebellar degeneration and his health has deteriorated to the point that he was relegated into a wheelchair. As a result, Kim took care of him, until his death in 2021.

On 2013, Roh Tae-woo admitted to corruption 16 years after being in office and had to repay illegally gained wealth of W24 billion (22 million USD) of a W262.9 billion fine for corruption in office. It is believed that his fraudulent savings were transferred to a bank in his wife's name. As a result, she agreed in repaying her husband's debt to the state.

== Personal life ==
Kim and Roh Tae-woo have two children: daughter Soh Yeong Roh (born 1961) and son Jae-heon Roh (born 1965). Jae-heon is currently the ambassador of South Korea to China since 2025, while Soh is the founder and current director of Art Center Nabi in Seoul. Soh is married to the chairman of the South Korean group SK Corporation Chey Tae-won, with their divorce proceedings underway since 2017.

In April 2021, she and her husband were baptized and converted to Catholicism from Protestantism. She was given the baptismal name Mary.

== Honours ==
- South Korea:
  - Honorary Recipient of the Grand Order of Mugunghwa (1988)
- Malaysia:
  - Honorary Recipient of the Most Exalted Order of the Crown of the Realm (1988)

== In popular culture ==
- 4th Republic (1995) – Yang Mi-kyung
- The Age of Three Kims (1998) – Kim Hae-sook
- 5th Republic (2005) – Song Ok-sook

Honorary titles
Preceded by Lee Soon-ja	First Lady of South Korea; February 25, 1988 – February 24, 1993	Succeeded by Son Myung-soon
