= Baekdamsa =

Buddhist temple in South Korea

- 백담사
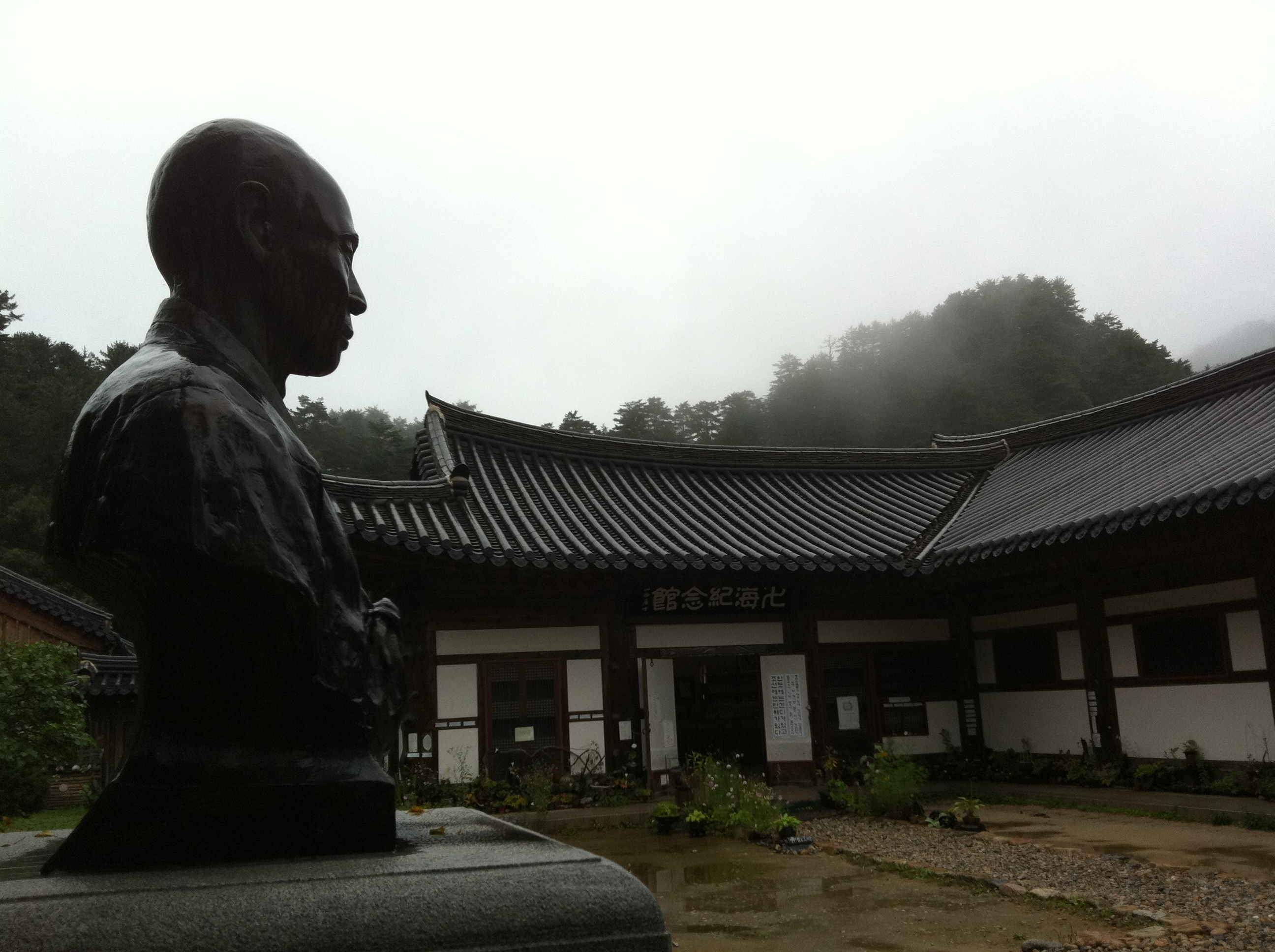
- Baekdamsa Temple in South Korea

- Location within South Korea

Religion
- Affiliation: Jogye Order

Location
- Location: 746 Baekdam-ro Inje-gun Gangwon Province (Korean: 강원도 인제군 북면 백담로 746)
- Country: South Korea
- Coordinates: 38°09′53.0″N 128°22′25.9″E

Baekdamsa (Korean: 백담사; Hanja: 百潭寺) is a Buddhist temple in Inje County, Gangwon province, South Korea. It was originally built in the 7th century, but the temple has been rebuilt numerous times since then due to war and natural disasters. The present version was completed in 1957. Additionally, the name has also changed over time. Originally called Hangyesa, the new name reflects the "100 pits from Daecheongbong Peak to the temple".

== History ==
Baekdamsa is known for its history of repeated destruction and rebuilding. It was originally built in 647 but was destroyed by fire, rebuilt in 790 but destroyed by fire, rebuilt in 987 but destroyed by fire, rebuilt in 1434 but destroyed by fire, and rebuilt in 1447 but was destroyed by fire. The temple was eventually rebuilt in 1457 but was destroyed again in 1772, 1915, and 1950, all due to fire.

Baekdamsa Temple was established by Ven. Jajang Yulsa in 647 in Hangye-ri under the name Hangyesa (寒溪寺) Temple. After its founding, the name changed several times to Unheungsa, Samwonsa, Seongusa and Yeongchwisa. Finally in 1783, Choe Bung and Ven. Undam renamed it Baekdamsa Temple, the name still used today, literally meaning “Hundred Pool Temple.” This is because 100 natural pools are claimed to be near the temple fed by water from Daecheongbong Peak.

In 1905, poet Han Yong-un was ordained at the temple. Ven. Undam attained enlightenment and then he wrote such great works as Joseonbulgyo yusinnon (朝鮮佛敎維新論; Reformation of Joseon Buddhism), Siphyeondam juhae (十玄談註解; Commentary on the Ten Profound Verses) and a poetry collection titled Nimui chimmuk (Silence of My Beloved). Unlike Outer Seorak, which is relatively busy and crowded, Inner Seorak is quiet and has much unexplored terrain and primitive forests. Situated at the entrance to Inner Seorak, Baekdamsa Temple oversees nearby hermitages like Bongjeongam Hermitage and Oseam Hermitage located in remote folds of the mountains.

At Baekdamsa Temple, there are monuments and Dharma halls related to Han Yong-un, such as the statue and poetry stele of Manhae, Manhae Memorial Hall, and Manhae Educational Hall. Recently, Baekdamsa Temple was designated a Gibon Seonwon (Foundational Seon Temple) and established a special meditation center named Mumungwan. There, a practitioner can lock himself/herself in a room and practice meditation alone, without leaving, for a fixed period of time. In this way the temple has made itself a refuge for young monks who only want to concentrate on Seon meditation practice.

From 1988 to 1990, following the end of his tenure as president, former military dictator Chun Doo-hwan and wife Lee Soon-ja spent several years at the temple as penance for their actions.

== Cultural properties ==
Cultural Heritage of Baekdamsa and Nearby Tourist Attractions Baekdamsa Temple has one state-designated cultural item: a Wooden Seated Amitabha Buddha (Treasure No. 1182). Enshrined in the Paradise Hall (Geungnak-bojeon), the statue was produced in 1748 when the temple was relocated from nearby Hangyesa. It is considered an excellent example of early 18th century wood-carving.

Bongjeongam, a hermitage overseen by Baekdamsa Temple, is noted for enshrining authentic relics of the Buddha which Ven. Jajang Yulsa brought back after studying in China. The hermitage is 11 kilometers (7 miles) past Baekdamsa Temple, on the mountain behind Bongjeongam Hermitage, in a five-story pagoda called Sakyamuni Relics Pagoda (Treasure No. 1832).

Climbing up from Baekdamsa Temple along the Suryeom-dong Valley, one finds two more valleys, Gugok-dam to the right and Gaya-dong to the left. Farther up Gaya-dong Valley is another hermitage overseen by Baekdamsa Temple, called Oseam. A legend concerning this hermitage says that a five-year-old child monk was left alone here on this secluded, snow-covered mountain but survived the long, harsh winter thanks to the blessings of Avalokitêśvara. Both the story and the hermitage have become well known since the story was published as a children's book and an animated movie was made about it.

== Tourism ==
It also offers temple stay programs where visitors can experience Buddhist culture. In particularly, The temple stay is held at national temples in celebration of the nation's largest holiday festival. Woljeongsa Temple, Baekdam Temple and Shinheung Temple in Gangwon Province conduct a special temple stay program for foreigners. The Buddhist temple will hold a temple stay for one night and two days on February 15 and February 17.

== Gallery ==
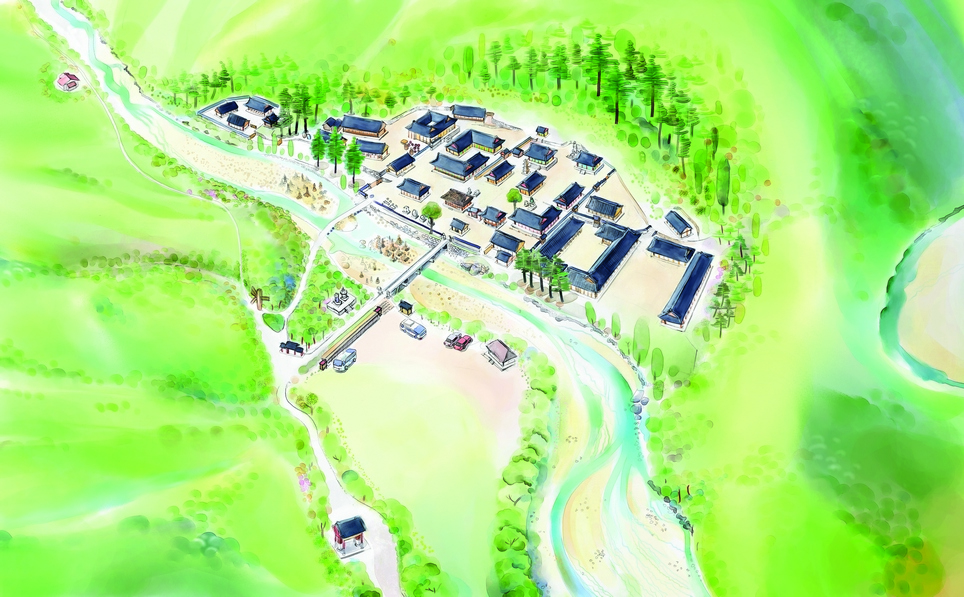

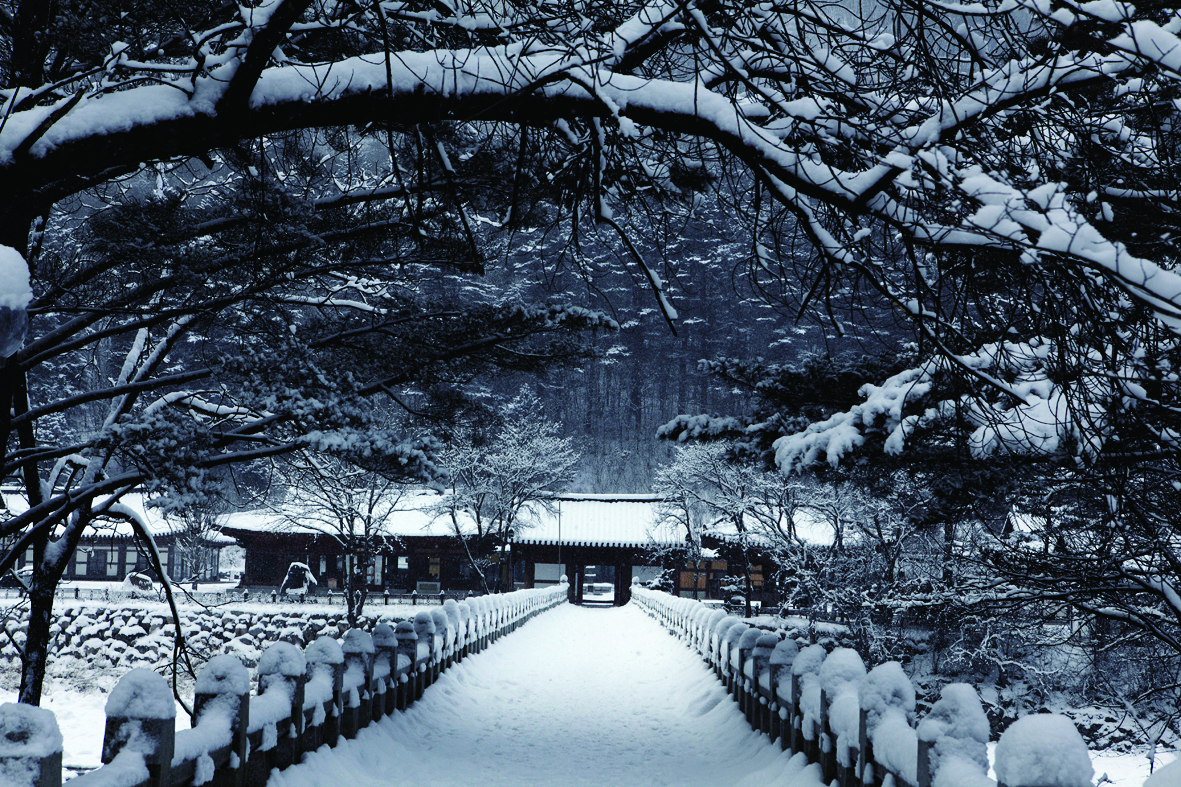

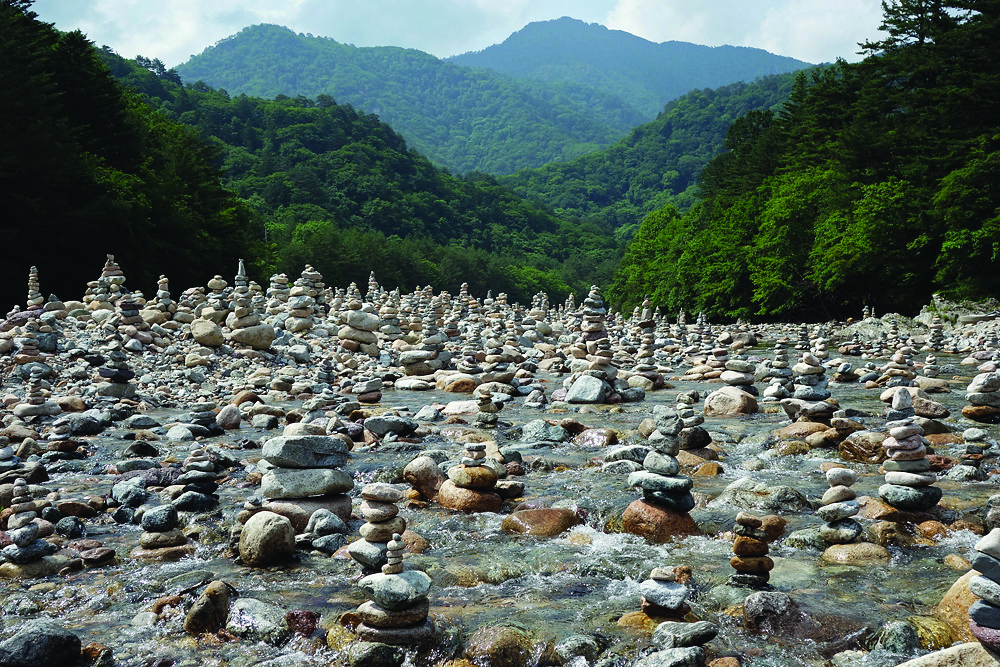

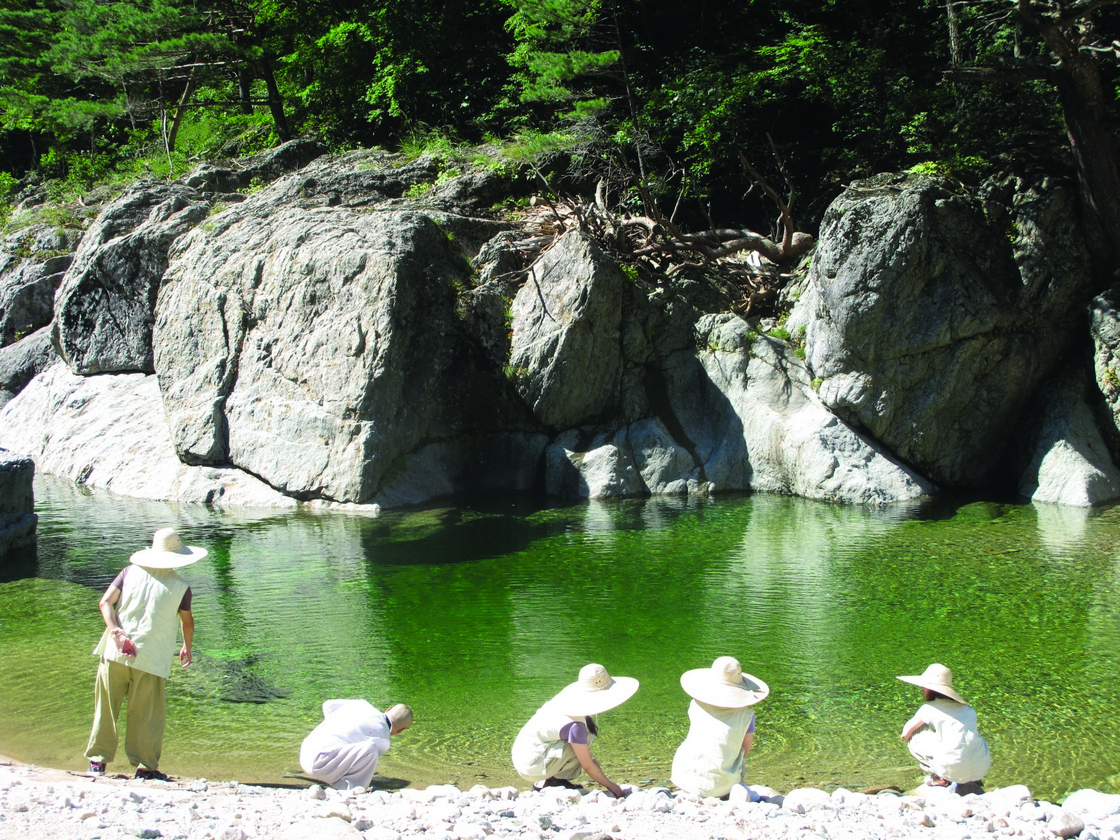

== In popular culture ==
- The Temple is shown in the 2015 television series Reply 1988

== See also ==
- Seoraksan
- Han Young-un
- Chun Doo-hwan
- Lee Soon-ja
- Buddhism in Korea
