= Han Yong-un =

Korean writer (1879–1944)

Man-hae
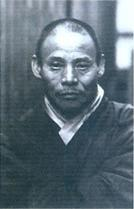
- Han in 1937
- Born: Han Yu-cheon; August 29, 1879; Hongseong, South Chungcheong Province, Joseon
- Died: June 29, 1944 (aged 64)
- Citizenship: Korean
- Writing career
- Language: Korean

Korean name
- Hangul: 한용운
- Hanja: 韓龍雲
- RR: Han Yongun
- MR: Han Yongun

Art name
- Hangul: 만해
- Hanja: 萬海, 卍海
- RR: Manhae
- MR: Manhae

Courtesy name
- Hangul: 정옥
- Hanja: 貞玉
- RR: Jeongok
- MR: Chŏngok

Dharma name
- Hangul: 봉완
- Hanja: 奉玩
- RR: Bongwan
- MR: Pongwan

Childhood name
- Hangul: 한유천
- Hanja: 韓裕天
- RR: Han Yucheon
- MR: Han Yuch'ŏn

Han Yong-un (Korean: 한용운; August 29, 1879 – June 29, 1944) was a twentieth century Korean Buddhist reformer, poet, and independence activist against colonial rule. This name was his religious name, given by his meditation instructor in 1905, and Manhae (만해) was his art name; his birth name was Han Yu-cheon.

== Life ==
Manhae was born in Yucheon in Hongseong, South Chungcheong Province, Joseon. During his childhood, he studied the Chinese classics in a seodang; schools that were widespread during the Joseon period. Prior to being ordained, he was involved in resistance to Japanese influence in the country, which culminated in the Japanese occupation from 1905 to 1945. He lived in seclusion at Ose-am in the Baekdam Temple from 1896. During this period, he studied Buddhist sacred texts and several books of modern philosophy. In 1905 he received the robes of the Jogye Order of monks and in 1908 he went to Japan and visited several temples to study Buddhism and Eastern philosophy for six months. In 1919 he was one of the patriot signatories to the Korean Declaration of Independence.

== Work ==
As a social writer, Manhae called for the reform of Korean Buddhism.

Manhae's poetry dealt with both nationalism and sexual love, often mingling the two. One of his more political collections was Nimui Chimmuk (Lover's Silence, 님의 침묵), published in 1926. These works revolve around the ideas of equality and freedom and helped inspire the tendencies toward passive resistance and non-violence in the Korean independence movement.

In 1913, Han Yongun published "The Restoration of Korean Buddhism (Joseonbulgyo-yusimlon), which criticized the anachronistic isolationist policy of Joseon Buddhism and its incongruence with the then contemporary reality. The work sent tremors through the intellectual world. In this work, the author promulgated the principle of equality, self-discovery, the potential for Buddhism for safeguarding the world, and progress. His development as an activist and thinker resulted from his adherence to these very principles.

In 1918, Han published "Whole Mind" (Yusim), a work that aimed to enlighten young people. In the following year, he played an important role in the 3.1 Independence movement with Chae Lin, for which he was later imprisoned and served a three-year sentence. During his imprisonment, Han composed "Reasons for Korean Independence" (Joseondoglib-i-yuseo) as a response to the official investigation into his political engagement. He was later acquitted in 1922, at which time he began a nationwide lecture tour. The purpose of the tour was to engage and inspire youth, an objective first established in Han's "Whole Mind". In 1924, he became the Chair of the Buddhist youth assembly.

The poems published in Han's Nim-ui Chimmuk had been written at Baekdam Temple in the previous year. This book garnered much attention from literary critics and intellectuals at the time. Despite his many other publications, from Chinese poems to sijos and the poems included in Yusim, and novels such as Dark Wind (Heukpung), Regret (Huhoe), Misfortune (Bakmyeong), this collection remains the poet's most significant and enduring literary achievement. In it, love for his country plainly appears under the guise of longing for the loved one, as in the poem "I Do Not Know".

Whose footstep is that paulownia leaf that falls silently in the windless air, drawing a perpendicular?

Whose face is that piece of blue sky peeping through the black clouds, chased by the west wind after a dreary rain?

Whose breath is that unnameable fragrance, born amid the green moss in the flowerless deep forest and trailing over the ancient tower?

Whose song is that winding stream gushing from an unknown source and breaking against the rocks?

Whose poem is that twilight that adorns the falling day, treading over the boundless sea with lotus feet and caressing the vast sky with jade hands?

The ember becomes oil again.

Ah, for whose night does this feeble lantern keep vigil, the unquenchable flame in my heart?

Han's model for such rhapsodic, long-lined expressions of devotion was Rabindranath Tagore, whose work he knew, and behind Tagore the long Indian tradition of combining mysticism with eroticism. In 2007, he was listed by the Korean Poets' Association among the ten most important modern Korean poets.

== Poetry in translation ==
- Younghill Kang & Frances Keely, Meditations of the Lover, Yonsei University 1970
- Jaihiun Kim, Love's Silence and other poems, Vancouver B.C. 1999
- Francisca Cho, "Everything Yearned For: Manhae's Poems of Love and Longing", Wisdom Publications 2005
