= Roh Soh-yeong =

South Korean business executive (born 1961)

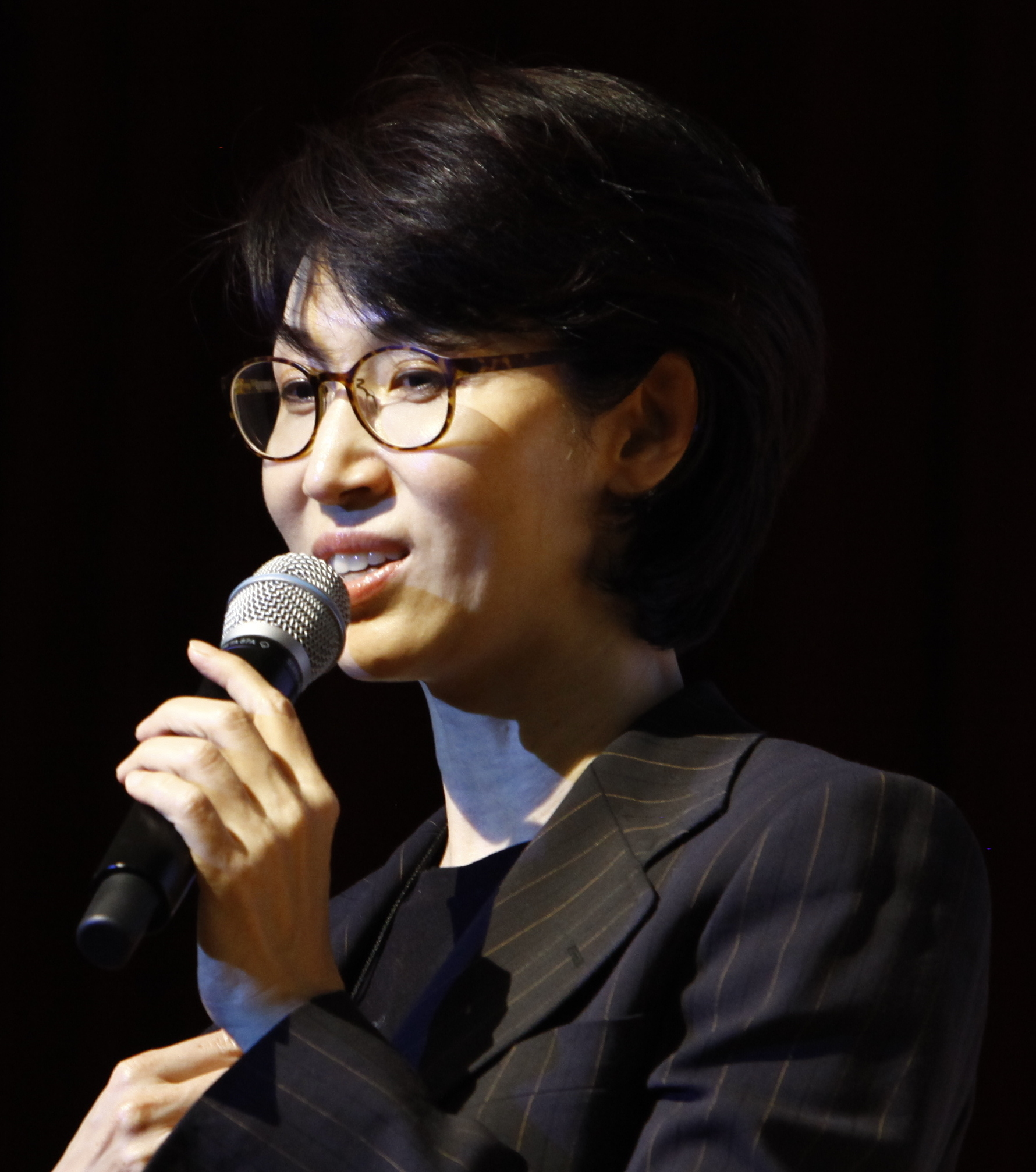
- Roh in 2015
- Born: March 31, 1961 (age 65); Daegu, South Korea
- Education: College of William & Mary (BA); Stanford University (MEd)
- Occupation: Business executive
- Years active: 2000–present
- Title: Founder and director of Art Center Nabi
- Children: 3
- Parents: Roh Tae-woo (father); Kim Ok-suk (mother)
- Relatives: Roh Jae-heon (brother)

Korean name
- Hangul: 노소영
- Hanja: 盧素英
- RR: No Soyeong
- MR: No Soyŏng
- Website: nabi.or.kr

Roh Soh-yeong (Korean: 노소영; born March 31, 1961) is a South Korean business executive who is the founder and director of Art Center Nabi.

== Early life and education ==
Roh Soh-yeong was born in Daegu, South Korea, on March 31, 1961. Her father, Roh Tae-woo is a former South Korean politician and army general who served as the 6th president of South Korea from 1988 to 1993. She has a younger brother, Roh Jae-heon, who is a lawyer in the United States.

She attended Sudo Girls' High School in Seoul, South Korea, and then went to the United States for further education, attending the College of William & Mary in Virginia as an undergraduate and doing graduate work in economics at the University of Chicago. Then, she gained her master's degree in education from Stanford University in California before returning to South Korea for graduate study in Media Communication at Yonsei University in Seoul.

== Career ==
=== Art Center Nabi ===
In 2000, Roh founded Art Center Nabi. It has a predecessor of Walkerhill art museum which was a private contemporary art museum in Seoul. She transformed the art museum into a new media art museum.

Under her supervision, Art Center Nabi has been organizing various exhibitions and projects, such as Why Future Still needs Us- AI and Humanity(2016), Nabi Artist Residency 2016, Robot Theatre(2016), Robot Party (2015), Makeable City (2015), Nam June Paik SPECIAL EXHIBITION: HOMAGE TO GOOD MORNING MR. ORWELL (2014), Butterfly series (2014, 2015), Incheon International Digital Art Festival 2010 (2010), Come Join Us, Mr. Orwell! (2009), p.Art.y (2007) and so forth.

- Why Future Still needs Us- AI and Humanity(2016): The exhibition was held from November 2016 to January 2017. This was one of the AI projects including a variety of events related to AI, such as AI conference, AI Hackathon.
- Nabi Artist Residency 2016(2016): Nabi Artist Residency 2016 was an international residency program to cooperate with media artists who studied HCI and AI area and Art Center Nabi's E.I.Lab creators for developing artworks.
- Robot Theatre(2016): This exhibition introduced a trend of modern art using robots in various areas, such as music, performance, media art.
- Robot Party(2015): The exhibition Robot Party was held from December 2015 to January 2016. The Robot Party conveyed the interaction between humans and robots. Artists, DIY makers, and Startups participated in the exhibitions.
- Butterfly 2015(2015): The exhibition Butterfly 2015: wearable technology Art was the series Butterfly of 2015 and demonstrated the wearable technology art, which employed the wearable computing technology as a tool for new expression and communication. Butterfly 2015 was produced by artists such as Bang&Lee, HongBum Kim, Sanghwa Hong, Hyuns Hong, Chungyo Ha, MinHye Lee, Eunmi Jung, JaePil Choi, JiYe Kim and JiHyun Yun.
- Makeable City(2015): The exhibition Makeable City was held together with the Global Summit 2015 - Creative Commons in Seoul in October 2015. The Makeable City is organized to convey the picture of the city as a new community created by makers, such as TeSoc Hah, NamHo Cho, DongHoon Park, YoungBae Suh, Hyun Park, and Dizi Riu.
- Nam June Paik SPECIAL EXHIBITION: HOMAGE TO GOOD MORNING MR. ORWELL(2014): The exhibition Nam June Paik SPECIAL EXHIBITION was held in Busan, South Korea, from October 2014 to November 2014. This special exhibition, Homage to Good Morning, Mr. Orwell was a telematic project to demonstrate how the spirit of Paik's work was continued, and recreated 30 years after the first international satellite performance was broadcast live.
- Butterflies 2014(2014): The exhibition Butterflies 2014 was held from March 2014 to June 2014. The exhibition highlighted artistic activities that were moving toward the convergence beyond the boundaries of different genres, art, architecture, design, media art, science and so on.

In 2010, she organized the Incheon International Digital Art Festival 2010 (INDAF 2010) in Incheon, South Korea. The exhibition INDAF 2010 was held from September 1, 2010, to September 30, 2010, and she gave a speech about how she got Mobile Vision in the Keynote Conversation 1.

- "One connected world, eternal time and space, diversity blossoming from it, free navigation and mobility of the human being... 'Nothing to fear in my joy,' declared Nam June Paik early on. I want to share such joy with as many people as possible through Nabi's activities."
  - Speech at the INDAF Conference 2010, Incheon, South Korea, (2010)

Also, she directed the SK Telecom Pavilion at Expo 2012 held in Yeosu, South Korea, from May 12, 2012, to August 12, 2012. SK Telecom Pavilion reflected the belief that rapidly evolving information and communication technologies (ICT) could play a significant role in increasing happiness in everyday life.

=== Presentation ===
- My Fair Robot(September 18, 2016): As an invited speaker, Soh yeong Roh delivered a presentation 'My Fair Robot' in Future Fest which is an event from Nesta. In this presentation, she showed what Art Center Nabi has been doing for the past two years making 30 social robots and shared what she's learned by talking to and playing with these robots. She also demonstrated how engaging in such activities revealed more about us humans than about the machines.

== Other activities ==
=== Writing ===
In 2014 Roh released her book, Digital Art, published by Jaeum&Moeum.

- Digital Art by Director Soh Yeong Roh (published in 2014) ISBN 978-89-5707-807-5
- Lay Artists (published in 2012) ISBN 978-89-954728-7-3
- 10 Years of Art Center Nabi (published in 2010) ISBN 978-89-954728-1-1

== Controversies ==
=== Verbal abuse ===
In 2018, South Korean media published an interview with two victims who said Roh verbally abused her personal drivers. Two anonymous individuals who had worked as personal chauffeurs since 2007 stated that they experienced verbal abuse and violent behaviour such as throwing objects inside the vehicle. Further revelations from a gym staff and her former secretary followed.

=== Roh's reaction ===
However, Roh, the Director of the Nabi Art Center, embroiled in controversy over mistreatment by a chauffeur, expressed her feelings. In response, she revealed her state of mind through another media outlet, saying, "How can someone who throws things and uses foul language live like this... You can understand what I mean if you think about it."

AsiaN claimed that the media will 'listen' to Roh's opinion, since a false implication could pose a serious risk of human rights violations and defamation against her. The article states that the controversy surrounding Director Roh has been extensively covered by most media outlets, following the lead of the Hankyoreh newspaper. Park Young-sik, a lawyer representing Director Roh also stated the following. "Everything is not true. It is highly subjective, so it is inappropriate to respond to each claim."

== Personal life ==
In 1988, Roh married the chairman of the South Korean group SK Group, Chey Tae-won, and has two daughters and a son. In December 2015, Roh and Chey divorced. In December 2022, the Seoul Family Court approved the divorce, and Chey kept most of his shares. As part of the divorce, a court ordered Chey to pay $1 billion to his former wife. The settlement was overturned in October 2025 by the Supreme Court of Korea, which ordered a review after finding a miscalculation that increased the value of the couple's assets. However, in the same ruling in October 2025, the Supreme Court officially finalized the divorce and a 2 billion won alimony payment, legally ending their marriage after 10 years of legal dispute. Following the Supreme Court's remand of the property division, the Seoul High Court ruled in July 2026 that Chey must pay 944 billion won (approximately $668 million) in asset division. In August 2026, Chey appealed this decision, sending the ongoing property division case back to the Supreme Court.
