= Richard D. Kisling =

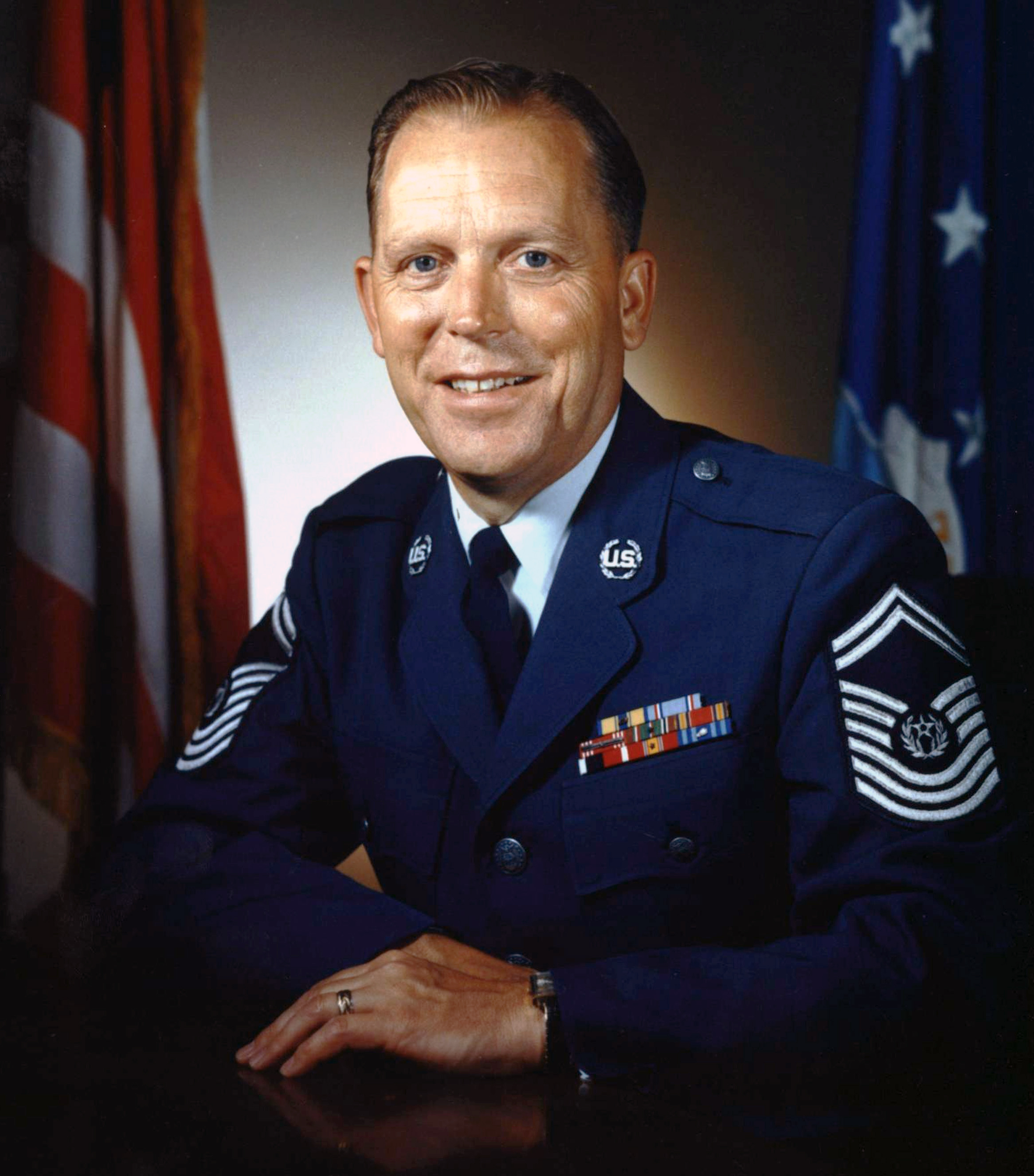
- Kisling c. 1971
- Born: November 22, 1923; Mapleton, Iowa, US
- Died: November 3, 1985 (aged 61); Andrews Air Force Base, Maryland, US
- Military career
- Branch: United States Army; United States Army Air Corps; United States Air Force
- Service years: 1944–1947 (Army); 1947 (Air Corps); 1947–73 (Air Force)
- Rank: Chief Master Sergeant of the Air Force
- Units: 3rd Infantry Division; 88th Infantry Division
- Conflicts: World War II
- Awards: Air Force Commendation Medal (2)

Richard D. Kisling (November 22, 1923 – November 3, 1985) was a senior airman of the United States Air Force who served as the 3rd Chief Master Sergeant of the Air Force from 1971 to 1973.

== Early life ==
Kisling was born on November 22, 1923 in Mapleton, Iowa and was one of ten children. His father was a township assessor and his mother was a teacher. During World War II, he was a grain inspector in Sioux City, Iowa which was considered an essential job during the war. But after the D-Day invasion, his draft status was changed and he was no longer deferred due to his job.

== Military career ==
Kisling was drafted and entered the United States Army in July 1944 and was sent to Fort Crook, Nebraska for induction. He was assigned to the infantry and sent to Little Rock, Arkansas for combat training. Due to being ill during his initial training, Kisling didn't leave for Europe until the Spring of 1945.

He was assigned to the 3rd Infantry Division in Salzburg, Austria relocating displaced persons. He returned to the United States and was discharged from the Army, but 93 days later he reenlisted and volunteered for overseas service. He was sent to the 80th Infantry Division in Italy but was offered an early discharge. He went back to the United States and again reenlisted.

In April 1947, he re-enlisted in the United States Army Air Force and was assigned to the Mobile Training Unit, Chanute Field, Illinois. When the United States Air Force became a separate military service in 1947, he transferred to the Air Force and was in the personnel field during most of his subsequent career. In May 1948, he transferred to Hamilton Air Force Base, California, where he served as a personnel clerk, enlisted branch, Headquarters 4th Air Force. He was assigned to the 1261st Air Transport Squadron, Tripoli, Libya, he arrived in April 1950 as a staff sergeant and left in March 1952 as first sergeant.

Kisling returned to the United States in April 1952 and was assigned as first sergeant of the 1707th Food Service Squadron, Palm Beach International Airport, West Palm Beach, Florida. In October 1952 he transferred to Amarillo, Texas, as first sergeant and personnel sergeant major with the 1739th Ferrying Squadron. In February 1954, Kisling was applied for a transfer to the Southwest Recruiting District, Fort Sam Houston, Texas. He became sergeant major of the 3504th United States Air Force Recruiting Group, Lackland Air Force Base, Texas in May 1954. In 1956 he was selected as the Outstanding Support Airman of the Year for Air Force Recruiting Service.

Kisling was sent to Chaumont, France, in August 1956 as base personnel sergeant major, 48th Tactical Fighter Wing. In August 1959 he became base personnel sergeant major at Nellis Air Force Base, Nevada, and he was promoted to chief master sergeant on December 1, 1959. He was selected as the Outstanding Airman of the Year for 12th Air Force in 1960. He transferred to March Air Force Base, California, in August 1961 for duty as Tactical Air Command personnel adviser to the 452nd Troop Carrier Wing of the Air Force Reserve. He was assigned as base personnel sergeant major at George Air Force Base, Calif., in September 1962.

In August 1963, Kisling joined the United States Air Force Security Service as personnel sergeant major, European Security Region, Frankfurt, West Germany. In May 1967 he became noncommissioned officer in charge, programs and requirements division, deputy chief of staff, personnel, Headquarters Air Force Security Service, Kelly Air Force Base, Texas. He was selected as the senior airman adviser, Air Force Security Service in September 1969.

Kisling became Chief Master Sergeant of the Air Force on October 1, 1971. In this role he was adviser to Secretary of the Air Force Robert C. Seamans Jr. and Chief of Staff of the Air Force, General John D. Ryan, on matters concerning welfare, effective utilization and progress of the enlisted members of the Air Force. Kisling encouraged the Air Force to open a Senior Noncommissioned Officer Academy to provide professional education to senior NCOs. He was the third chief master sergeant appointed to this top noncommissioned officer position. Kisling retired from the Air Force on September 30, 1973.

== Later life ==
Upon his retirement, Kisling continued serving the Air Force as a civil servant, assigned to the Air Staff. He served on the staff of the deputy chief of staff, personnel, from April 1975 through October 1982, and with the staff of the deputy chief of staff, administration, from November 1982 until his retirement from civil service on May 20, 1985. He was awarded the Exceptional Civilian Service Award in May 1985.

Kisling died on November 3, 1985, at Malcolm Grow Medical Center, Andrews Air Force Base, Maryland, as a result of amyotrophic lateral sclerosis. His contributions and service to the Air Force and country spanned more than 40 years—as a leader and spokesperson.

In 2004, Kisling Community Center at Lackland Air Force Base, Texas was dedicated to Kisling. The Kisling Noncommisioned Officers Academy located in Vogelweh, Germany is also named after him.

== Awards and decorations ==
Personal decorations
Air Force Commendation Medal with bronze oak leaf cluster
Service awards
Air Force Good Conduct Medal with two bronze oak leaf clusters
Army Good Conduct Medal with six Good Conduct Loops
Campaign and service medals
European-African-Middle Eastern Campaign Medal with bronze service star
World War II Victory Medal
Army of Occupation Medal
National Defense Service Medal with bronze service star
Service, training, and marksmanship awards
Air Force Longevity Service Award with silver oak leaf cluster
Civilian awards
Air Force Exceptional Public Service Award

Military offices
Preceded by Donald L. Harlow	Chief Master Sergeant of the Air Force; 1971–1973	Succeeded by Thomas N. Barnes
