= Seorin-dong =

Neighbourhood in Seoul, South Korea

- Interactive map of Seorin-dong
- Country: South Korea

Area
  - Total: 0.05 km^{2} (0.019 sq mi)

Korean name
- Hangul: 서린동
- Hanja: 瑞麟洞
- RR: Seorin-dong
- MR: Sŏrin-dong

Seorin-dong (Korean: 서린동) is a dong (neighbourhood) of Jongno District, Seoul, South Korea. It is a legal dong (법정동 法定洞) administered under its administrative dong (행정동 行政洞), Jongno 1, 2, 3, 4 ga-dong.

== Attraction ==
- Art Center Nabi
- Korea Kumho Pertrochemical Co., Ltd

== See also ==
- Administrative divisions of South Korea
