= Son Myung-soon =

First Lady of South Korea from 1993 to 1998 (1929–2024)

- 손명순
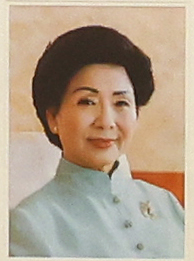
- Portrait in Blue Room

First Lady of South Korea
- In role 25 February 1993 – 24 February 1998
- President: Kim Young-sam
- Preceded by: Kim Ok-suk
- Succeeded by: Lee Hee-ho

Personal details
- Born: 29 January 1929 Gimhae, Korea, Empire of Japan
- Died: 7 March 2024 (aged 95) Seoul, South Korea
- Spouse: Kim Young-sam (m. 1951; died 2015)
- Children: 6
- Education: Ewha Womans University
- Religion: Presbyterianism (GAPCK)

- Son Myung-soon
- Hangul: 손명순
- Hanja: 孫命順
- RR: Son Myeongsun
- MR: Son Myŏngsun

Son Myung-soon (Korean: 손명순; Hanja: 孫命順; 29 January 1929 – 7 March 2024), also transliterated as Sohn Myung Soon, was the First Lady of South Korea from 1993 to 1998.

== Biography ==
Son was born on 29 January 1929 in Shinryū-yū, Kinkai-gun, Keishōnan Province, Korea, Empire of Japan (now Gimhae, South Korea) to Son Sang-ho and Kim Geunyi. She had two younger sisters who died early and her birth mother died in 1935. Her father later remarried to Gam Deok-soon, and had two more sons and six more daughters. Her father Sang-ho ran the largest rubber factory in Yeongnam and was called the "Masan chaebol."

Son graduated from Jin Young Daechang Elementary School in Gimhae, Gyeongsangnam-do and Masan Girls' High School in Changwon. She later attended Ewha Womans University, where she took course in Pharmacy and married Kim Young-sam in 1951, during her third year at Ewha. In 1946, a new rule at Ehwa had been established which prohibited marriage of enrolled students. However, with the help of others, even after giving birth to her first child, she kept her marriage secret until graduation and was able to finish her studies.

On 18 December 1992, Kim Young-sam was elected President of South Korea. And when he took office as president on 24 February 1993, Son Myung-soon began working as First Lady of South Korea. As First Lady, she helped to build a restaurant or lounge at the Blue House for attendants, drivers, and female employees. Son was praised for being a quiet helper and for emphasizing the traditional role of women.

== Personal life and death ==
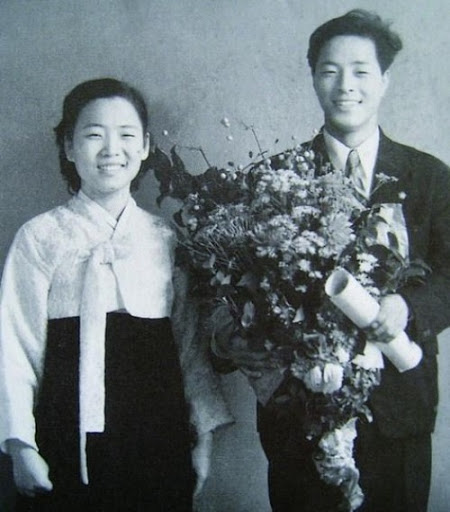
Son in 1950

Son and Kim Young-sam had five children: three daughters (Kim Hye-young, Kim Hye-jeong, Kim Hye-suk) and two sons (Kim Hyun-cheol, Euncheol Kim). Kim Hyun-cheol currently serves as Executive Director of Kim Young-sam Democratic Center.

Son Myung-soon died on 7 March 2024, at the age of 95, from COVID-19.

== Honours ==
- South Korea:
  - Honorary Recipient of the Grand Order of Mugunghwa (1993)

Honorary titles
Preceded by Kim Ok-suk	First Lady of South Korea; 1993–1998	Succeeded by Lee Hee-ho
