= Art Center Nabi =

Digital art museum in Seoul, South Korea

Coordinates: 37.5699°N 126.9811°E

Art Center Nabi 아트센터나비
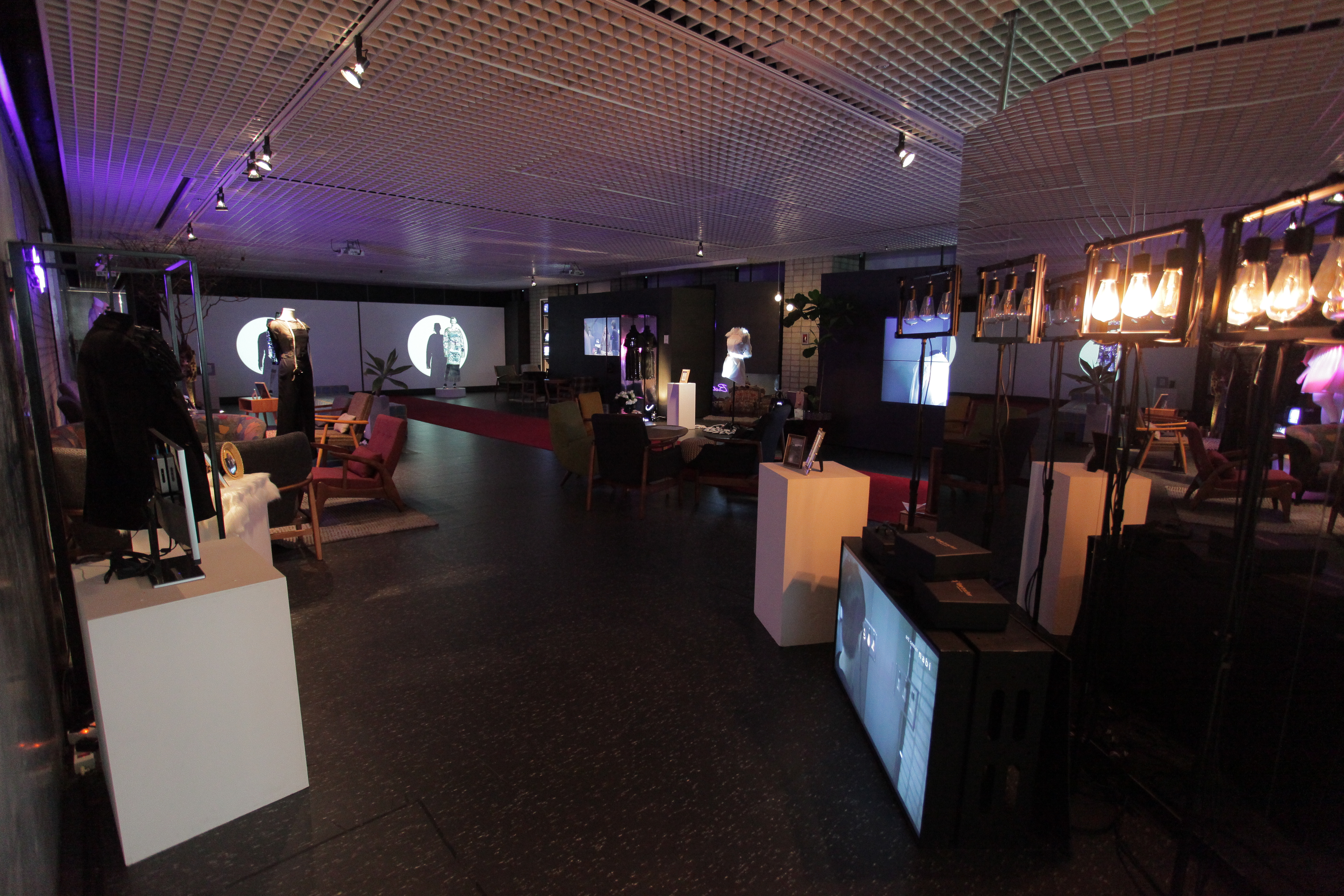
- Established: 2000
- Location: 26, Jong-ro, Jongno-gu, Seoul, 03188, South Korea
- Type: Art museum
- Director: SohYeong Roh
- Website: www.nabi.or.kr

The Art Center Nabi (Korean: 아트센터나비) is an art museum in Seorin-dong, Jongno District, Seoul, South Korea. It was relocated to the 4th floor of SK building of SK Group in 2000 and reborn as digital art museum.

Art Center Nabi has produced and exhibited various kinds of digital art at the intersection of arts and technology.

== Exhibitions and Projects ==
- Why Future Still needs Us- AI and Humanity (2016): For the coming epoch of Cognitive Revolution, the exhibition, from November 2016 to January 2017, featured multilateral approaches to Artificial Intelligence with artists, inventors, programmers. This exhibition introduced various artworks, bringing AI and various other fields together and produced by diverse artists such as Harshit Agrawal, Maurice Benayoun, Gene Kogan.
- Nabi Artist Residency 2016: an international residency program from July 25 to september 14, 2016. Media artists, Harshit Agrawal and Mischa Daams developed their artworks with Art Center Nabi's E.I.Lab creators. On the 24th of August they gave an artist talk.
- Robot Theatre (2016): Employing Robot to the most human-like area, this exhibition pursued the idea of Nam June Paik 'Humanizing Technology'. Robot Theatre introduced a trend of modern art using robots in various areas such as music, performance, media art.
- Robot Party (2015): The exhibition Robot Party was held from December 2015 to January 2016. The Robot Party conveyed the interaction between humans and robots. Various artists, DIY makers, and Startups participated in the exhibitions.
- Butterfly 2015 (2015): The exhibition Butterfly 2015: wearable technology Art was the series Butterfly of 2015 and demonstrated the wearable technology art, which employed the wearable computing technology as a tool for new expression and communication. Butterfly 2015 was produced by diverse artists such as Bang&Lee, HongBum Kim, Sanghwa Hong, Hyuns Hong, Chungyo Ha, MinHye Lee, Eunmi Jung, JaePil Choi, JiYe Kim and JiHyun Yun.
- Makeable City (2015): The exhibition Makeable City was held together with the Global Summit 2015 - Creative Commons in Seoul in October 2015. The Makeable City is organized to convey the picture of the city as a new community created by creative makers, such as TeSoc Hah, NamHo Cho, DongHoon Park, YoungBae Suh, Hyun Park, and Dizi Riu.
- Butterflies 2014 (2014)
- Nam June Paik SPECIAL EXHIBITION: HOMAGE TO GOOD MORNING MR. ORWELL (2014)
- BEAM the Night (2013, 2014)
- Nabi hackathon (2013-)
- INDAF (2010)
- Come Join Us, Mr. Orwell! (2009)
- P.Art.y (2007)
- Trialogue (2001)

== Education ==
- Goyang Media Art School of Dreams: This education program is designed for students from 9 to 15 years old. It was held from July 15, 2015 to February 4, 2016 and May 10 to December 23, 2016
- Creative Mentoring Program for Young Professionals: This education program is designed for people who want to create contents in media art, robotics, interaction design, digital manufacturing fields.
- Media Art School of Dreams: This education program is designed for middle school students to experience the design thinking process and learn about entrepreneurship through hands-on activities.

== Publications ==
- Digital Art by Director SohYeong Roh (published in 2014) ISBN 978-89-5707-807-5
- Lay Artists (published in 2012) ISBN 978-89-954728-7-3
- 10 Years of Art Center Nabi (published in 2010) ISBN 978-89-954728-1-1

== See also ==
- List of museums in Seoul
