= Seoul National Cemetery =

National cemetery in South Korea

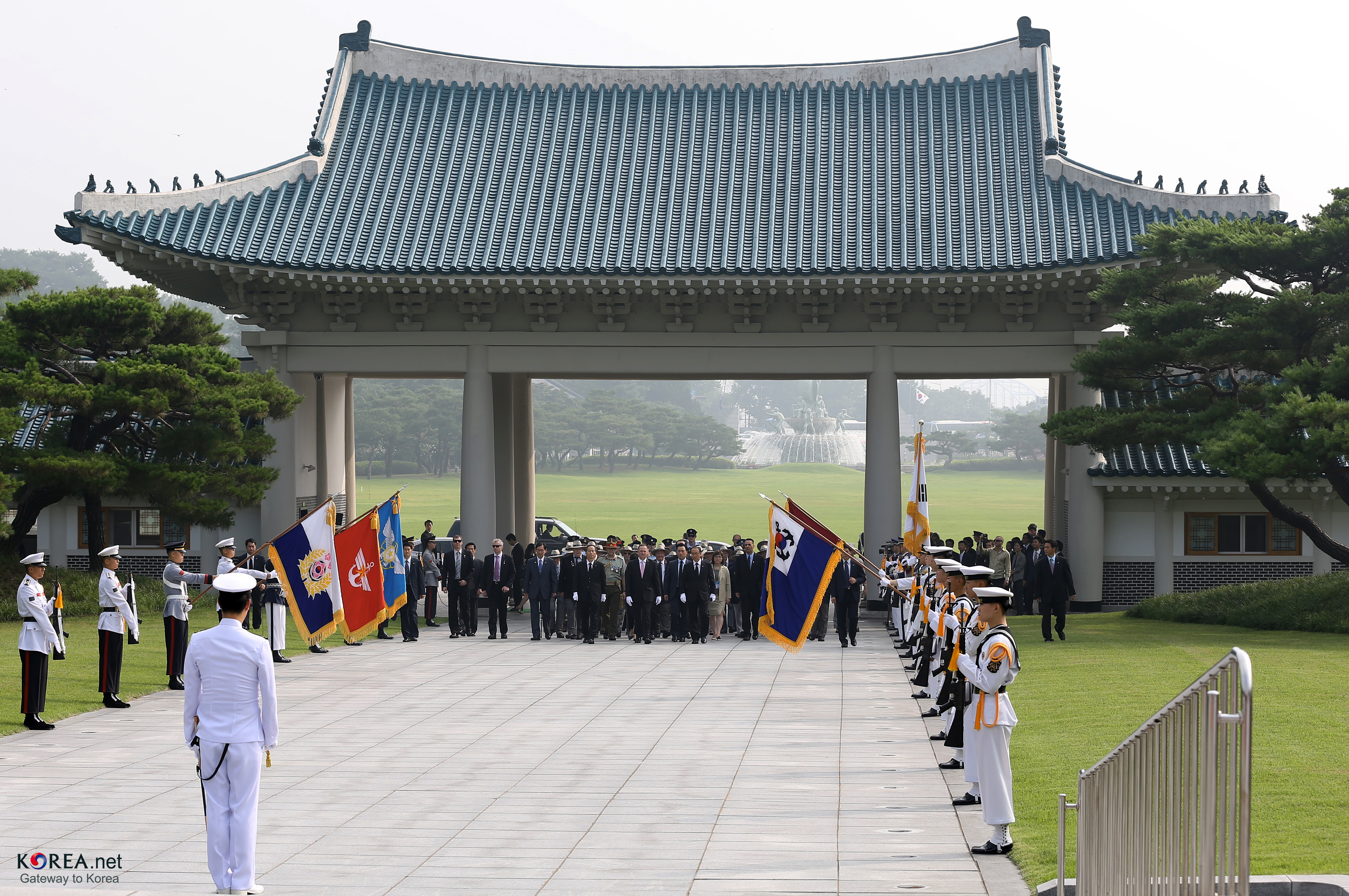
- Hyeonchung gate
- Interactive map of Seoul National Cemetery

Details
- Established: 1956
- Location: Dongjak-dong, Dongjak-gu, Seoul, South Korea; 37°29′56″N 126°58′20″E
- Country: South Korea

Korean name
- Hangul: 국립서울현충원
- Hanja: 國立서울顯忠院
- RR: Gungnip Seoul hyeonchungwon
- MR: Kungnip Sŏul hyŏnch'ungwŏn

Seoul National Cemetery (Korean: 국립서울현충원) is a cemetery in Dongjak-dong, Dongjak District, Seoul, South Korea. It is reserved for Korean veterans, including those who died in the Korean independence movement, Korean War, and Vietnam War. Four South Korean presidents are buried in the cemetery.

The Seoul National Cemetery is near Dongjak Station on Seoul Subway Line 4 or Seoul Subway Line 9. Except for some special days, the Seoul National Cemetery usually allows access to the public.

== History ==
When established by presidential decree of Syngman Rhee in 1956, Seoul National Cemetery was the country's only national cemetery. As the cemetery reached capacity in the early 1970s, Daejeon National Cemetery was established in 1976. Both cemeteries were originally overseen by the Ministry of Defence until 2006, when the Daejeon National Cemetery was transferred to the Ministry of Patriots' and Veterans' Affairs (South Korea).

== Notable people buried ==
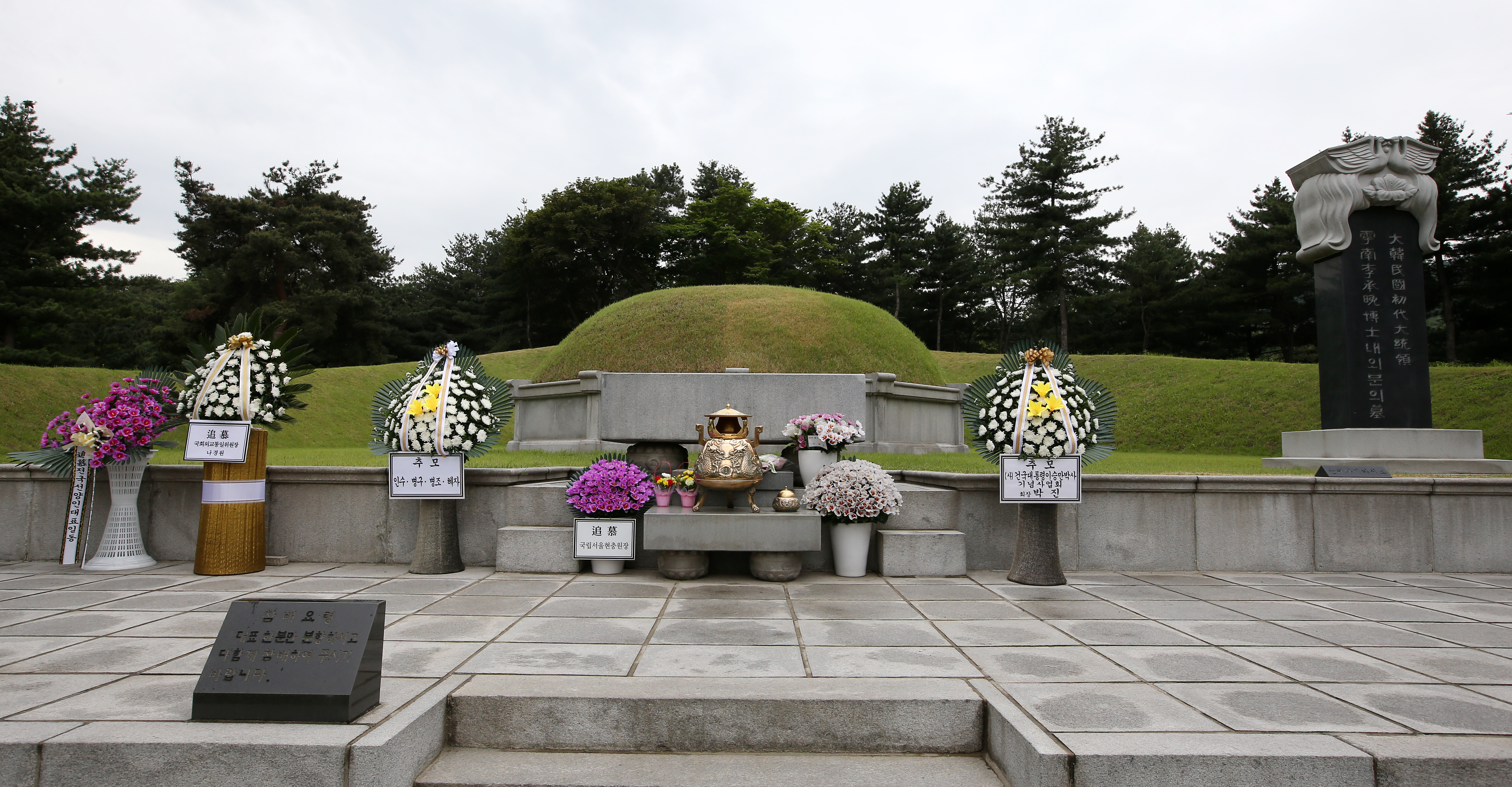
Tomb of President Syngman Rhee in Seoul National Cemetery

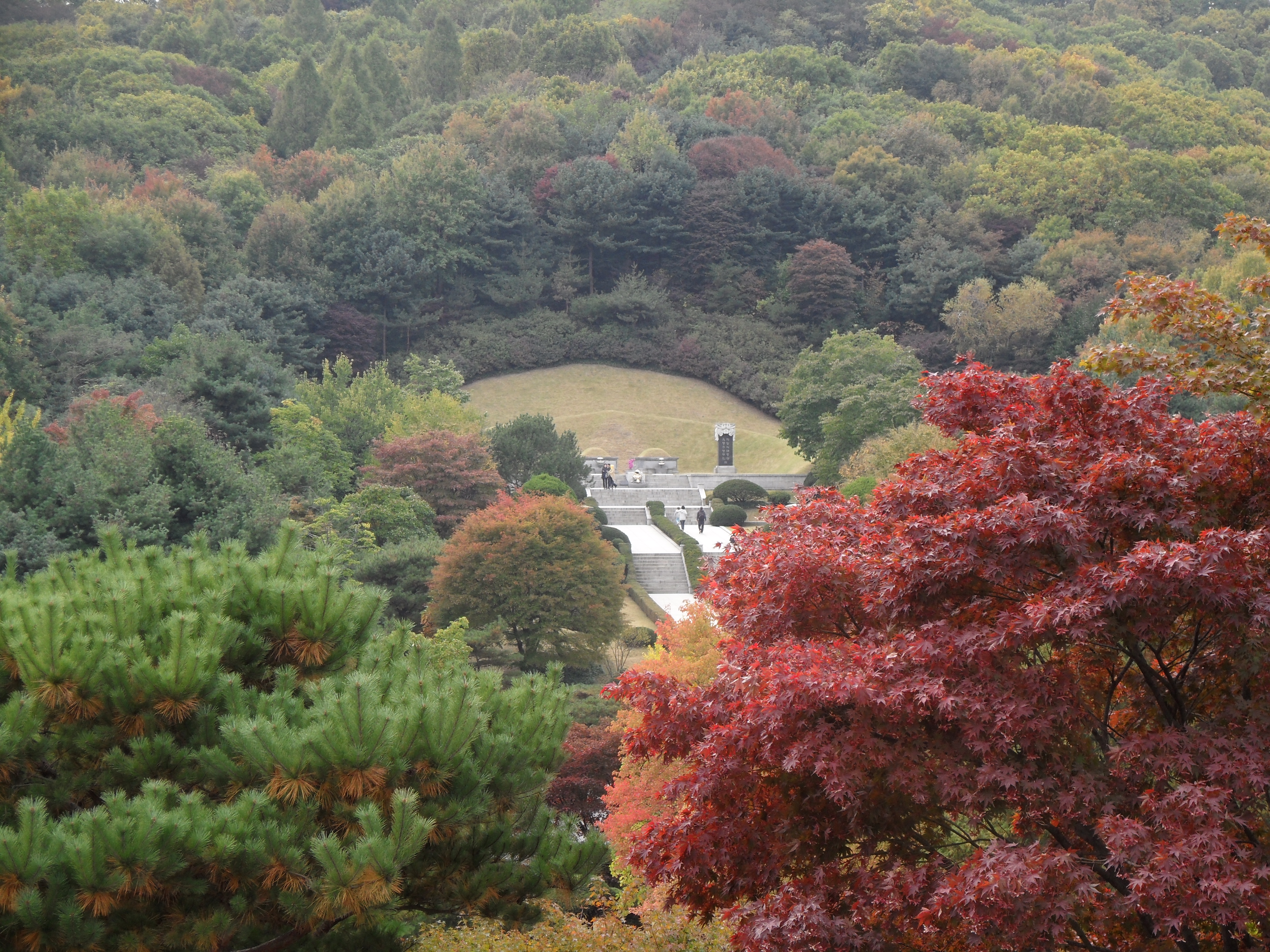
Tomb of President Park Chung Hee in Seoul National Cemetery

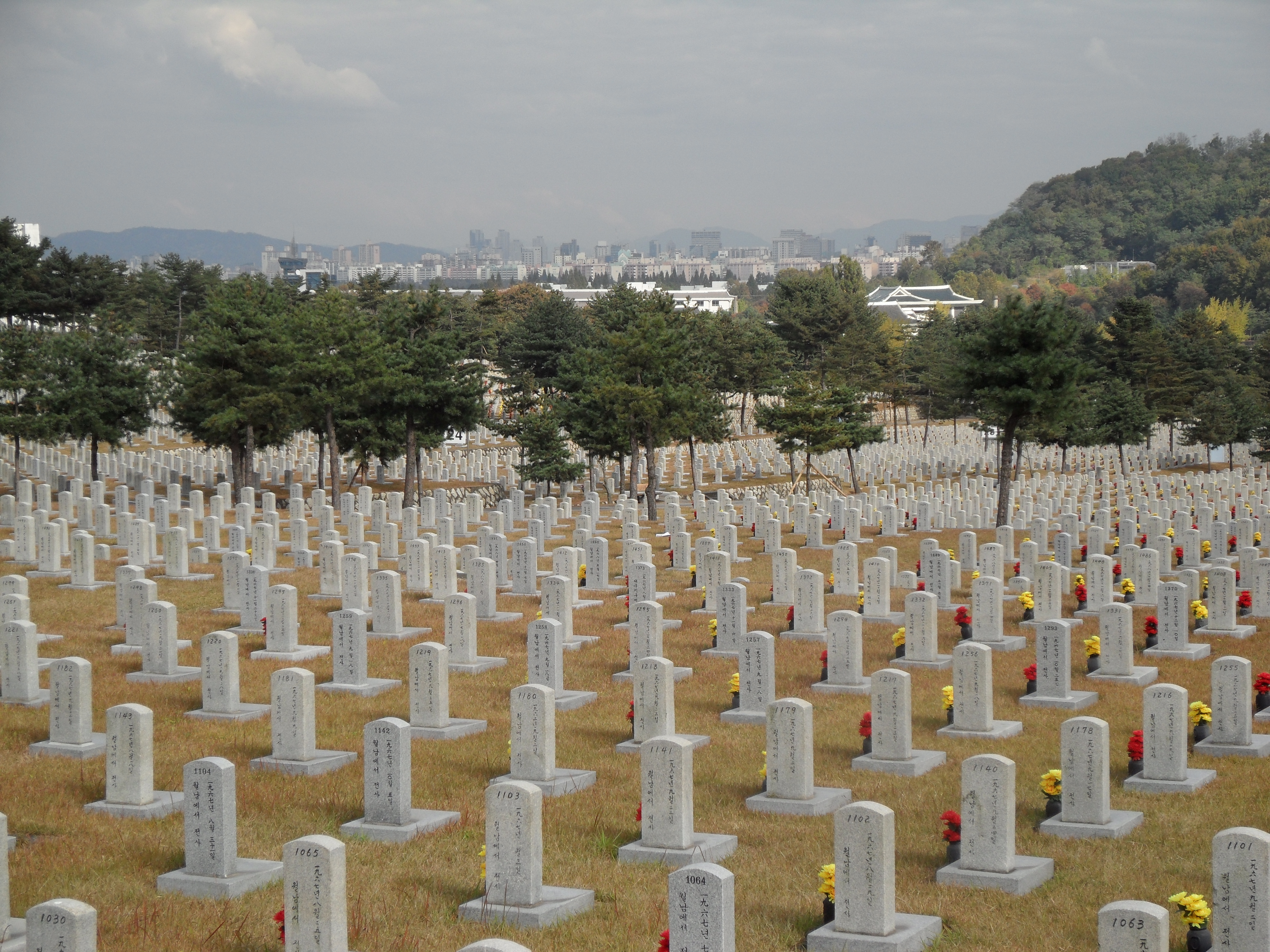
Seoul National Cemetery 26th Sanctuary

- Syngman Rhee – first President of South Korea – buried 1965
  - Franziska Donner – wife of President Rhee – buried 1992
- Park Chung Hee – third President of South Korea – buried 1979
  - Yuk Young-soo – wife of President Park – buried 1974
- Kim Dae-jung – 8th President of South Korea – buried 2009. On his death, he was buried at the National Cemetery, instead of in Daejeon National Cemetery, the initially planned burial site.
  - Lee Hee-ho - wife of President Kim Dae-jung - buried 2019
- Kim Young-sam – 7th President of South Korea – buried 2015
  - Son Myung Soon - wife of President Kim Young-Sam - buried 2024

== North Korean controversies ==
On June 22, 1970, three North Korean agents broke into the cemetery and planted a bomb. One agent was killed when the bomb was accidentally detonated.

In August 2005, a visit by a North Korean delegation to the cemetery caused some anger in South Korea. The delegation, which had 182 officials, was led by Kim Ki-Nam. The visit not only sparked outrage among those opposed to warmer relations with the North, but also raised fears that a future delegation from the South might be expected to pay their respects to Kim Il-sung in Pyongyang.

== See also ==
- List of national cemeteries by country
- Daejeon National Cemetery
- Kumsusan Palace of the Sun – in North Korea
- Revolutionary Martyrs' Cemetery – in North Korea
- Patriotic Martyrs' Cemetery – in North Korea
- United Nations Memorial Cemetery in Busan
- Cemetery for North Korean and Chinese Soldiers in Paju
- War Memorial of Korea in Seoul
- May 18th National Cemetery in Gwangju
