= Thomas N. Barnes =

Chief Master Sergeant of the US Air Force (1930–2003)

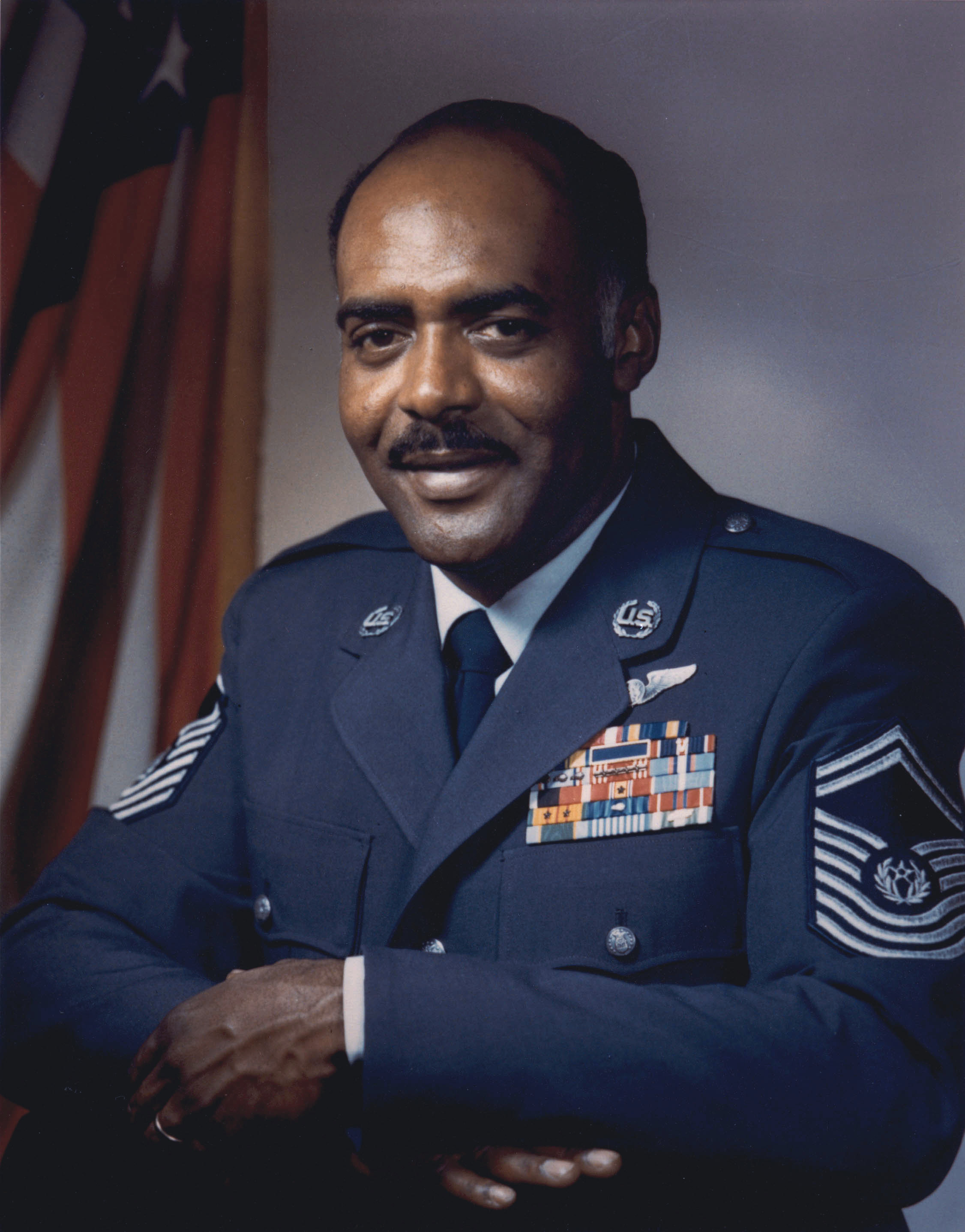
- Barnes c. 1973
- Born: November 16, 1930; Chester, Pennsylvania, US
- Died: March 17, 2003 (aged 72); Sherman, Texas, US
- Military career
- Branch: United States Air Force
- Service years: 1949–1977
- Rank: Chief Master Sergeant of the Air Force
- Unit: 8th Tactical Fighter Wing
- Conflicts: Korean War; Vietnam War
- Awards: Legion of Merit; Meritorious Service Medal (3); Air Medal; Air Force Commendation Medal

Thomas Nelson Barnes (November 16, 1930 – March 17, 2003) was an airman in the United States Air Force who served as the 4th Chief Master Sergeant of the Air Force from October 1973 to July 1977, the first African American in that position. He was also the first African-American Senior Enlisted Advisor in any of the Armed Forces of the United States. He was key in bringing many African-American related issues to the attention of senior military leaders.

== Early life ==
Thomas "Tom" Barnes was born in 1930 in Chester, Pennsylvania where his father was the pastor of a large Baptist church. His father died when he was 14 and he worked for a shipbuilding company to help support the family.

== Military career ==
Barnes enlisted the United States Air Force in April 1949 and received his basic training at Lackland Air Force Base in Texas. Upon reading Lackland, Barnes and several other African America recruits were separated from the white recruits as the Air Force had not yet put Executive Order 9981 into practice yet and the base was still segregated. His hometown of Chester has been mainly integrated and the new airman experienced segregation for the first time.

He later attended Aircraft and Engine School and Hydraulic Specialist School at the Chanute Technical Training Center in Illinois. In October 1950 he was assigned to the 4th Troop Carrier Squadron of the 62nd Troop Carrier Group at McChord Air Force Base, Washington.

In November 1950, aged 20, Barnes transferred with the 4th Troop Carrier Squadron to Ashiya, Japan, in support of the Korean War. Shortly after arrival in Japan, he completed on-the-job training for flight engineer duties. Then, due to low unit manning, he performed both flight engineer and hydraulic specialist duties in C-54 Skymasters. In September 1951 he transferred to Tachikawa, Japan, and continued flight engineer duties. Before leaving Japan, he was promoted to sergeant and awarded the Air Medal.

Barnes transferred in June 1952 to the 30th Air Transport Squadron, Westover Air Force Base, Massachusetts, where he attended C-118 Liftmaster school and continued his flight engineer duties in that aircraft. In September 1952, he volunteered for temporary duty with the 1708th Ferrying Group at Kelly Air Force Base, Texas, and participated in ferrying aircraft from various depots to Air Force organizations in Hawaii, Japan and Northeast Air Command. Upon completion of temporary duty, he returned to Westover.

Barnes transferred to Andrews Air Force Base in December 1952, and he was promoted to staff sergeant and served as crew chief and flight engineer on the B-25 Mitchell, T-11 Kansan, C-45 Expeditor and C-47 Skytrain aircraft in support of various requirements of Headquarters United States Air Force, Headquarters Military Air Transport Service, and the Air Research and Development Command. It was during this time that Barnes applied for commissioning and was accepted but had to turn down the opportunity because the pay cut which officer candidates experience while undergoing training would not allow him to continue to support his wife and children. Before leaving Andrews, Barnes was promoted to technical sergeant.

Barnes transferred in June 1958 to the 42nd Bombardment Wing at Loring Air Force Base, Maine, in June 1958 and served as a B-52 Stratofortress crew chief, flight chief and senior controller. He was promoted to master sergeant. In September 1965 he went to Fairchild Air Force Base, Washington, and continued duties as senior controller. In October 1966, he entered the F-4 Field Training Detachment at George Air Force Base, California, and in December 1966 went to Southeast Asia. There he served with the 8th Tactical Fighter Wing at Ubon Air Base, Thailand as noncommissioned officer in charge, reparable processing center; senior controller; and noncommissioned officer in charge, maintenance control working with F-4 Phantom fighters.

Barnes returned from Southeast Asia to Laughlin Air Force Base, Texas, in December 1967, where his duties were T-38 Talon section line chief; noncommissioned officer in charge, maintenance control; and senior enlisted advisor to the commander of the 3646th Pilot Training Wing. He was promoted to the grade of chief master sergeant on December 1, 1969, and was transferred to Headquarters Air Training Command in October 1971 to assume duties as command senior enlisted adviser.

On October 1, 1973, Barnes was appointed Chief Master Sergeant of the Air Force. At the expiration of the initial two-year tenure, he was extended for an additional year by the Chief of Staff. In February 1976 he was selected by the Chief of Staff to serve an unprecedented second year extension. He retired on July 31, 1977. As CMSAF, he worked to improve opportunities for minority airmen as well as female airmen, but always maintained that USAF policies should benefit all airmen. He promoted professional education as a requirement for promotion to the highest grades.

== Later life ==
Following his retirement from the Air Force, Barnes worked at the First National Bank of Fort Worth as an Employee Relations Officer for seven years. He was then hired by the Associates Corporation of North America and promoted to Vice President/Director of Employee Relations at the corporate headquarters in Las Colinas. After retiring to Fannin County, Texas, he raised Longhorn cattle and two years in a row won the team penning at the Kueckelhan Rodeo.

Barnes died from cancer on March 17, 2003, in Sherman, Texas, where he had been undergoing treatment.

== Awards and decorations ==
US Air Force Enlisted Aircrew Badge

Personal decorations
Width-44 crimson ribbon with a pair of width-2 white stripes on the edges	Legion of Merit
Width-44 crimson ribbon with two width-8 white stripes at distance 4 from the edges.	Meritorious Service Medal with two bronze oak leaf clusters
	Air Medal
	Air Force Commendation Medal
Unit awards
	Presidential Unit Citation
	Air Force Outstanding Unit Award with Valor device
Service awards
	Air Force Good Conduct Medal with silver and two bronze oak leaf clusters
	Army Good Conduct Medal with four loop bronze clasp
	Outstanding Airman of the Year Ribbon
Campaign and service medals
	Army of Occupation Medal
Width=44 scarlet ribbon with a central width-4 golden yellow stripe, flanked by pairs of width-1 scarlet, white, Old Glory blue, and white stripes	National Defense Service Medal with bronze service star
	Korean Service Medal
	Vietnam Service Medal with two bronze service stars
Service, training, and marksmanship awards
	Air Force Longevity Service Award with silver oak leaf cluster
	NCO Professional Military Education Graduate Ribbon with bronze oak leaf cluster
	Small Arms Expert Marksmanship Ribbon with bronze service star
Foreign awards
	United Nations Service Medal for Korea
	Vietnam Campaign Medal

Military offices
Preceded by Richard D. Kisling	Chief Master Sergeant of the Air Force; 1973–1977	Succeeded by Robert D. Gaylor
