= Lee Hee-ho =

First Lady of South Korea from 1998 to 2003

- 이희호
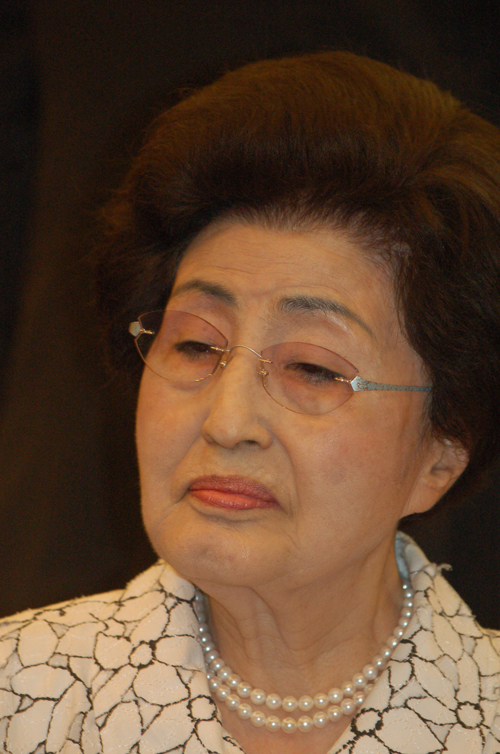
- Hee-ho, c. 2010

First Lady of South Korea
- In role 25 February 1998 – 24 February 2003
- President: Kim Dae-jung
- Preceded by: Son Myung-soon
- Succeeded by: Kwon Yang-sook

Personal details
- Born: 21 September 1922 Jongno District, Keijō, Korea, Empire of Japan
- Died: 10 June 2019 (aged 96) Severance Hospital, Sinchon-dong, Seoul, South Korea
- Resting place: Seoul National Cemetery
- Spouse: Kim Dae-jung (m. 1962; died 2009)
- Children: 1 (2 stepchildren)
- Education: Seoul National University; Lambuth University; Scarritt College

Korean name
- Hangul: 이희호
- Hanja: 李姬鎬
- RR: I Huiho
- MR: I Hŭiho

Lee Hee-ho, sometimes spelled as Lee Hui-ho (Korean: 이희호; Hanja: 李姬鎬; 21 September 1922 – 10 June 2019), was a South Korean women's rights activist, peace advocate and former First Lady of South Korea during the presidency of her husband Kim Dae-jung from 1998 to 2003.

She is widely regarded as one of the pioneering feminists of South Korea. Throughout her life, she championed women's empowerment and elimination of gender discrimination.

After her marriage, she worked for pro-democracy movements with her husband over two decades of authoritarian regimes.

During and after her husband's presidency, she had participated in and led notable works enhancing inter-Korean relations. Lee chaired the Kim Dae Jung Peace Center, which was founded by her husband to promote peace and constructive inter-Korean relations, as well as to alleviate poverty.

== Early life ==
Lee was born in Keijō, now modern-day Seoul on 21 September 1922 during the period when Korea was under Japanese rule. Lee's father was the fourth person to receive a medical license in Korea after graduating from Severance Medical College; her mother was a faithful Methodist born into a family devoted to Korean traditional medicine. Lee was the oldest daughter and the fourth child in a family of six sons and two daughters.

When Lee was 18, her mother died and this led to her decision to live up to three principles: not getting married, staying healthy and studying, according to her book "To Accompany." Moreover, her deep faith in Methodism and continued academic endeavours were influenced by her mother.

Lee graduated from Ewha Girls' High School.

== Education ==
Lee attended Humanities and Arts department of Ewha College in 1942. However, she was unable to graduate because of Japanese colonial policies at the time.

In 1946 she went to College of Education of Seoul National University to major in English literature which changed to education when she was a sophomore. She was her College's representative at the University's student union. In February 1950, several months before the outbreak of the Korean War, Lee graduated from Seoul National University.

Lee earned a bachelor's degree from Lambuth University. Lee studied for a master's degree from Scarritt College for Christian Workers and Lambuth University.

== Career ==
=== First generation feminist of South Korea ===
During the Korean War, Lee left Seoul and moved to Busan where she founded Korean Women Youth Organisation with her friends as opposed to women's league of North Korea's Communist Party. After quitting the Organisation due to its function in reality limited solely to assisting military and police officers, Lee worked for youth division of National Council of Churches in Korea.

In 1952 Lee co-founded Research Institute for Women's Issues with her fellow women's rights activists including Lee Tai-young and continued to lead the Institute as the second president of the institute from 1964 to 1970.

=== First Lady of South Korea ===
In June 2000, First Lady Lee Hee-ho accompanied her husband to North Korea for the 2000 inter-Korean summit, which was the first time that the leaders of North and South Korea met face-to-face since the division of Korea. President Kim Dae-jung and Lee met with Kim Jong Il during the summit. While there, she also met a high school teacher of hers whom she has not seen in 60 years, for she and her husband moved up North during the Korean War

=== Inter-Korean peace advocate ===
Lee remained active in politics, diplomacy and inter-Korean relations throughout her 80s and 90s. She undertook several visits to North Korea to promote dialogue and better relations between the two countries. She traveled to Pyongyang in December 2011 following the death of Kim Jong Il.

At the age of 92, Lee led an 18-member delegation on a goodwill trip to North Korea from 5–8 August 2015. Her delegation included former Minister of Culture Kim Sung-jae, scholar Paik Nak-chung, and several educators, but no members of the sitting South Korean government.

=== Popularity ===
In March 2017, a public opinion survey showed that Lee Hee-ho was the considered the best first lady in South Korean history. 46% of the respondents had a positive view of her and only 5.7% had a negative view.

== Personal life ==
In 1962, Lee married Kim Dae-jung.

=== Death ===
In April 2019, Lee's oldest stepson, Kim Hong-il, a politician and former lawmaker, died at the age of 71. Lee was not informed of her son's death at time due to concerns about her own deteriorating health.

On 10 June 2019, Lee died at Severance Hospital in Seoul, Korea. She was 96 years old. A spokesperson of Kim Dae Jung Peace Center which she chaired confirmed that she died of old age rather than from her cancer, ten years after her husband's death, Kim Dae-jung.

== Honours ==
- (South Korea) Grand Master and Knight of the Grand Order of Mugunghwa (1998)

Honorary titles
Preceded by Son Myung-soon	First Lady of South Korea; 1998–2003	Succeeded by Kwon Yang-sook
