= Non-Commissioned Officer Academy =

Coordinates: 36.048162°N 127.074043°E

Non-Commissioned Officer Academy is a college located in Iksan, South Korea.
