= 747 Plan =

The 747 Plan(747공약) was a set of economic pledges in the 2007 campaign of Lee Myung-bak, who was elected President of South Korea. He held office from 2008 to 2013 but failed to achieve the goals.

Named after the Boeing 747 aircraft, the plan pledged 7 percent economic growth, raising per capita GDP to US$40,000, and making Korea the world's seventh-largest economy.

Lee's Strategy and Finance Minister Kang Man-soo is credited with the creation and design of the plan.

At the beginning of Lee's presidency, Korea was not among the ten largest economies and had per capita GDP of under US$20,000. Within months of him taking office, the plan's success was jeopardized by the 2008 financial crisis and ensuing global recession. Eventually, the 747 Plan proved unsuccessful.

== See also ==
- Economy of South Korea
- Grand Korean Waterway
- MB Doctrine
