= Four Major Rivers Project =

Restoration project in South Korea

The Four Major Rivers Restoration Project is the multi-purpose green growth project on the Han River, Nakdong River, Geum River and Yeongsan River in South Korea. The project was spearheaded by former South Korean president Lee Myung-bak and was declared complete on October 21, 2011. It was first announced as part of the "Green New Deal" policy launched in January 2009, and was later included in the government's five-year national plan in July 2009. The government estimated its full investment and funding totaled 22.2 trillion won (approximately US$17.3 billion).

The overall project was broken into three project sets: revitalizing the four rivers, projects on their 14 tributaries and refurbishment for other smaller-sized streams. The project had five key objectives as well: securing abundant water resources to combat water scarcity; implementing comprehensive flood control measures; improving water quality and restoring river ecosystems, creating multipurpose spaces for local residents; and regional development centered on the rivers.

More than 929 kilometres (577 mi) of streams in Korea will be restored as part of the project, with a follow-up operation planned to restore more than 10,000 kilometres (6,200 mi) of local streams. More than 35 riparian wetlands will also be reconstructed.

The project was declared complete by President Lee on October 21, 2011. The project was a major recurring story in the media and with the public. It often drew ire and protests over the toll that construction projects could take on the environment, as well as being seen as an extension of Lee's persona as former CEO of Hyundai Engineering & Construction Co. Ltd, nicknamed "The Bulldozer," with his push for swift approval of the project in the National Assembly.

== Background ==
The Four Rivers Restoration Project of Korea was designed to be a packaged project that aims to resolve water-related problems such as floods and droughts and revitalize Korean public spaces near the water. Its projects were carried out simultaneously with heavy investment from multiple government ministries over a 2-year period.

The Korean government estimated about 800 million m^{3} of water was needed to prevent water scarcity in 2011, and expected the need to grow to one billion m^{3} in 2016. It was also disclosed that while government recovery expenses due to flooding topped 4.2 trillion won over a decade, average annual investment in flood prevention was only 1.1 trillion won. The government also stated its objective to improve the rivers' water quality, by managing pollutants such as the increase of Biochemical oxygen demand and total phosphorus counts that can result in the waterways' eutrophication.

The government also outlined that existing spaces and programs along the rivers for watersports and cultural activities could not keep up with rising demand, a product of Koreans' rising income levels.

The Four Major Rivers Restoration Project is to contribute to recovering the real economy from the recession through job creation and local economic revitalization.

== Policy direction ==
The Four Major Rivers Restoration Project has the following policy directions

=== Proactive response against climate change ===
- Secure water resources in various ways to deal with droughts
- Convert from investment centered on disaster recovery into investment focused on prevention

=== Diversification of ways to secure water resources ===
- Dredging sediments, elevation of banks around agricultural reservoirs
- Expansion and connection of existing water resources facilities
- Continuous development of new water resources

=== Paradigm shift in river management policies ===
- River management policies such as dredging sediment will expand the flood spilling capacity
- Initial investment for prevention measures to minimize flood damages will be augmented.

=== Utilization of river areas as multipurpose spaces for the co-existence of the people and environment ===
- Gradual adjustment of riverside farmlands
- Creation of new areas for leisurely activities utilizing rivers
- Improvement of the access to waterfronts
- Enhance the value of the riverside as scenic areas
- Pursue regional development centered on rivers that elevates regional culture, ecological landscape, and quality of life.

== Main aspects ==
The Four Major Rivers Project implemented restoration initiatives that were focused on the installation of wastewater treatment and monitoring facilities as well as the construction of movable barriers (weirs) built across a river to control the flow of the water. Direct interventions to restore rivers also included the construction of multi-purpose dams and heightening of banks for 96 existing agricultural reservoirs. With the goal of maximizing the tourism benefits of the restoration project, the river banks and adjacent areas were also enhanced with bike lanes, green transportation network, and leisure facilities.

=== Implementation of five core challenges to achieve the goal of renewing the territory ===
- Korea is trying to secure adequate water supply (1.3 billion m^{3}) to respond to future water scarcity and severe drought due to climate change. To this end, Ministry of Land, Transport and Maritime Affairs will build reservoirs, weirs, and small dams, and expand the storage capacity of agricultural reservoirs.
- Preemptive measures are necessary against repetitive floods due to climate change, as well as 200-year floods. Therefore, Ministry of Land, Transport and Maritime is starting to dredge sediment, strengthen old levees, and build dams. (Secure 920 million m^{3} of flood control capacity)
- By 2012, the water quality of the mainstream will be improved to an average of level two (Biochemical Oxygen Demand less than 3ppm) by expanding sewage treatment facilities and establishing green algae reduction facilities. Moreover, the ministry is trying to restore ecological rivers, create wetlands, and readjust farmlands to rehabilitate the ecosystem.
- Rivers will turn into multipurpose areas for lifestyle, leisure, tourism, cultural activities, and green growth. To this end, bicycle lanes (1,728 km) will be developed, hands-on tour programs will be promoted, and walkways and sports facilities will be expanded.
- The project will also contribute to regional development through various plans that utilize the infrastructure planned in the project and the scenery. The examples are 'Four major rivers that flow with culture' of Ministry of Culture, Sports, and Tourism, and 'Creating a vivid land of beautiful scenery' of Ministry for Food, Agriculture, Forestry, and Fisheries.

=== Project time and cost ===
- Restoration of the four mainstreams such as dredging sediments and building reservoirs will be completed by 2011. Projects for the branch streams as well as building dams and agricultural reservoirs will be completed by 2012.
- Total cost is estimated at 16.9 trillion KRW.

=== Twelve cities and provinces submitted 836 recommendations worth 98.3 trillion KRW ===
- River-related 213 cases worth 6.9 trillion KRW that were coherent with the master plan were reflected. Examples are dredging sediments, fortifying levees, and restoring ecological rivers.

== Expected benefits ==
An opportunity for Korea to position itself as a powerhouse in water resources in the international community

=== Fundamental resolution of floods and water scarcity ===
1.17 billion m^{3} of water secured will strengthen our capacity to respond to future water shortage and droughts. Increased water storage thanks to dredging sediment and building reservoirs will equip us against droughts. And Ministry of Land, Transport and Maritime Affairs can be able to secure river maintenance water and strengthen flood control capacity even during droughts by building small sized multipurpose dams and expanding existing agricultural reservoirs.

Flood control capacity increased by 920 million m^{3} will enable us to fight climate change and keep our rivers safe even upon 200-year floods. Flood damage and recovery expenses will decrease by dredging sediment, and the down-streams will be protected by retention and riverside reservoirs. And the reinforcement of old levees will raise the safety in flood control.

=== Contribution to sound restoration of the ecosystem ===
- Secure swimmable water quality (level two, Biochemical Oxygen Demand 3ppm) by 2012, earlier than the originally scheduled 2015.
- Improvement of the environment through restoration of ecological rivers and development of waterside belts
- Readjustment of farmlands in riversides will reduce non-point pollution sources and improve the ecological environment.

=== Increased quality of cultural and leisurely activities, and lives ===
Local residents will enjoy culture, relaxation, and sports in redeveloped waterfronts. Also, the promotion of water sports and the construction of bicycle lanes will increase the opportunity for leisurely activities.

=== Local economies revitalized through the Green New Deal ===
The real economy will be recovered by stimulating domestic demand and creating new jobs. And as a part of the Green New Deal, the rivers restoration project will be utilized as a new growth engine. The benefits reaped from the project on the four major rivers areas which account for 70 percent of our territory will contribute to regional development. Also, regional growth will be accelerated through the rivers-oriented development. Overall, it is expected that the project will create 340,000 jobs and generate an estimated 40 trillion won (US$31.1 billion) of positive economic effects.

=== Promotion of green growth projects ===
- Clean-IT sensors to manage the river environment and disasters will be applied to this project
1. The development of remote sensors will enable real-time monitoring of water pollution, water level, vulnerable areas upon disasters, and facilities such as bridges and dams.
- Establishment of a digital tour system for the four major rivers
1. Digital tours on the culture and historic sites of the four major rivers will be promoted. To this end, the government will support technological development, commercialization, and international standardization of wireless communication, and positioning system.
- Development of unmanned underwater robots for environmental management of the four major rivers
1. Scientific management of resources and environment of the underwater which is difficult to access will become possible by using robots.
- Installment of photovoltaic and small hydropower power plants
1. Photovoltaic power generation facilities will be built in riversides that are not submerged.
2. The government will construct small hydropower plants when expanding existing reservoirs and agricultural reservoirs.

=== Bicycles ===
1,757 km of bicycle road would be constructed during the project. In 2012, international bike race "Tour de Korea 2012" was held, and it contributed in promoting the project's aspects of green growth and nation brand.

Companies from the People's Republic of China could benefit a potential sales hike of Made in China bicycles in South Korea, in which 85% of bicycles in South Korea are imported. Other countries can also benefit from this river project as there will be more imports of bicycle parts for bicycle production facilities around South Korea.

== Criticism of the project ==
The earliest criticism to the Four Major Rivers Project was political in nature and, specifically, lodged by those who were more generally opposed to the South Korean President, Lee Myung-bak's administration. These bristled at the notion that the project has been carried out without proper democratic process or local input. The rehabilitation of the main South Korean waterways has been a major component of Lee Myung-bak's election platform, labeled as the Grand Korean Waterway. There was fierce political opposition to this proposal based on the economic viability of the project and its doubtful goals. A study conducted by the Korea Water Resources Corporation in 1998 outlined that the plan was technically and economically unfeasible. Later, there was a heightened public unease over the plan, which prompted the newly installed Lee Myung-bak government to scrap it. When the Four Major Rivers Project was announced in early 2009, critics suspected that it was a mere name-change for the Grand Korean Waterway.

The Four Major Rivers Project has also attracted significant criticism from environmental groups in South Korea and wider international groups such as Friends of the Earth.

=== Environmental problems ===
The World Wetland Network awards countries for their efforts in wetland management, with Blue Globe Awards to highlight good practices in wetland management and Grey Globe Awards to draw attention to poor practices in wetland management. At their annual Conference of the Parties held on 7 July 2012, six Blue Globes and five Grey Globes were awarded; South Korea received one of the Grey Globes for the Four Major Rivers Project, particularly highlighting the project's implementation "... prior to proper environmental evaluation and the long term value of the wetlands destroyed".

==== Diverting rivers and constructing stepped artificial lakes ====
The 2010 March issue of Science Magazine outlined that one of the major plans of the project was to construct 16 dams in the main streams of the four major rivers. Opposing voices said these dams would turn the rivers into artificially stepped lakes, rather than the relatively free flowing rivers they are at present.

==== Environmental Impact Assessment without a plan ====
Opposition also claims that on top of the transformation into stepped lakes, the 4 Rivers Project is also suspected to be a backdoor operation towards President Lee's goal of constructing the Grand Korean Waterway, a canal from Seoul to Busan, by the end of his term in 2012. Lee proposed the idea before undertaking the 4 Rivers Project, and it was unpopular in the Assembly and with the public.

Another factor was Lee's announcement that an environmental impact study had been completed in October 2009 saying there would be no harmful impact to the rivers' ecosystems, however the project had just entered its turn-key bid phase a month prior, suggesting the legally required study was conducted without having fully realized plans. An example was the administration's holding a preliminary conference for constructing an ecological park on the Geum River almost a year after the study was completed.

Its procedure about preliminary feasibility study or the preliminary environmental review was not rigorous or was skipped. Also it failed to secure the procedural validity of the project by conducting the survey of the cultural property index in two months, and the environmental impact assessment in four months.

==== Pollution ====
There was a report of polluted underground water in Changweon, Gyeongsangnam-do due to this construction project.

The Ministry of Environmental Affairs announced on August 7, 2011, that it identified 12,660 tons of abandoned construction waste around the 11 main construction sites.

Traces of asbestos were found along the bicycle roads in Andong Nakdong river area. New water clarity goals allow for much higher pollution levels than currently exist, especially around areas of Paldang organic farming operations. A lawmaker claimed that 28 endangered species and natural monuments have disappeared from the Nakdong River, one of South Korea's four major rivers, due to the river project.

The validity of the measures against flood and drought damage has not yet been verified. Also, BOD and T-N are improving, but COD and algal concentrations are deteriorating.

==== Environmental damage ====
Based on the logic that the Nakdong River is lacking water, it was planned to install eight dammed pools for irrigation in the Nakdong River to secure water. However, the construction of dammed pools for irrigation in rivers slows the flow of water and deteriorates the quality of the water, so that the water obtained is likely to become a huge rotten "water mass". In addition, there is no precedent in the world where water is secured by installing dammed pools for irrigation on the main stream.

The project had two major detrimental impacts on the four major rivers that were improved as part of this project. As a result of substantially slowing the flow rate in rivers and changing flow regimes generally, cyanobacteria, also known as "blue-green algae," blooms have occurred annually every year since the project was declared complete. While algal blooms were not uncommon prior to the installation of the dams, weirs, and river dredging, the extent and duration of these blooms has greatly increased. Additionally, dredging the rivers had the unintended side effect of altering the typical depths of flow for the major rivers that were part of the project. This interrupted the natural ecosystem present in those rivers, and caused a shift in fish species from those that preferred shallow to medium depth flow to fish that thrive in deep water.

==== Increased risk of flooding ====
Dredging was feared to increase water flow velocity and erosion in upper streams and flooding in their lower reaches. A collapsed bridge in eastern Korea has been blamed on dredging.

The Sangju Weir on the Nakdong River is under the danger of collapsing despite it had been completed.

The river bed around the Changnyeong Haman weir has been experiencing depressions that could harm the structure of the weir.

Other claims were that the areas of high risk of flood and drought damage are located mainly in Gangwon Province and other eastern highlands, however most of the project's operations were conducted in other provinces (Gyunggi, Gyungsang, Junra and Choongchung) and lowlands.

==== Separation of the people from nature ====
Other protests were that the project would remove citizens from the natural wetland vegetation of the river systems and their traditional recreational usage, by deepening the rivers to beyond safe wading depth and replacing native river flora with garden flowers and oak trees. Thus, this "Disneyfication" of the rivers meant less unplanned recreation and more reliance on business-oriented recreation, such as cruise boats.

The birthplace of the organic farming movement in Korea was destroyed, despite the farmers winning court case against the government. With plans to turn the land into a riverside 'amusement park,' the farmers were evicted. Eventually, a group of Paldang farmers, academics, and activists won a second long-fought court battle to use the grounds as an organic farming and ecology education center, the only such successful case on record against the South Korean administrative branch regarding this project.

Fluvial geomorphologist, Matt Kondolf of University of California, Berkeley, criticized this project as an "obsolete" way of restoring rivers.

River expert, Hans Bernhart of Karlsruhe Institute of Technology, criticized the Four Major Rivers Project for the wide destruction of natural riverine environment according to his investigation along the Nakdong river. He mentioned the constructed areas around the Nakdong river as "typical constructions for canals" as well as mentioned European examples of restoring rivers that had modified similar to the Four Major Rivers Project.

Dr. Yamamoto Hirodake of the Kyoto University criticized the Four Major Rivers Project as a failed government-sponsored project that discourages both enterprise and environmental purposes akin to the Isahaya Bay Polder.

There are allegations of building extensive golf courses around the project areas, which could harm the original purpose of the project's goal.

South Korean painter, Kang Haeng-weon (강행원), released to the public his three paintings that depict the hope of restoring the developed four rivers back to their natural state.

=== Fraudulent goals ===
The amount of water secured by the four major rivers project is 1.30 billion m3, and plans to secure 1.02 billion m3 of water from the Nakdong River by 2012. Although the residual water in the Nakdong River area is already developed, it is not calculated by region. But it can be used in regions where there is not enough water remaining in the region in an appropriate way. Therefore, it is appropriate to calculate the amount of water deficit by area calculated on the assumption that surplus water quantity can be supplied to the adjacent area after calculation of oversize and abundance by 33 areas (33 subwatersheds) of Nakdong River. Therefore, in the Nakdong River area, it is estimated that 0.11 billion m3 of water will remain in 2011 and 201 billion m3 of water will be lacking in 2016. In this situation, the plan to secure 1.02 billion cubic meters of water from the Nakdong River area as a project to restore the four rivers should be fully reviewed.

According to the Long-Term Comprehensive Plan for Water Resources, which is a top-level plan based on the Laws about River established in 2006, 0.11 billion tons of water is left over in the Nakdong River area. This means there is a problem with one of the main goals of the project, the water shortage resolution.

Also cited is the lack of reference to other benefits of storing the water, other than water security.

South Korean Christian pastor and environmentalist, Choi Byeong-seong (최병성), wrote a book The Republic of Korea Is Crumbling (대한민국이 무너지고 있다) that discusses the "purposeless" goals of the project.

==== Impact on economic growth ====
In the case of the Four Rivers project, it was considered that it was difficult to give a high score on efficiency and economic growth because it was not clear about job creation and economic inducement effects. Also in terms of equity among the income classes, it was evaluated as a project that excluded the interests of small farmers. It was more concentrated to leisure activities for people who are higher than middle class and the profit structure of large construction companies, rather than the job creation of the ordinary people.

==== Inaccurate claims ====
There are suspicions that only 1% of the jobs required to finish the project were new jobs created by the planners, thus casting Lee's insistence that the project would ease recession pressure in Korea as inaccurate. Also, according to the government's report, it turned out that the project created 88,400 jobs, far less than they first expected.

==== Financial risk ====
The Professors' Group for Opposing the River & Waterway Project (운하반대교수모임) opposes this project by stating that the annual maintenance budget after the constructions would cost very expensive, around one trillion won. Democratic Party politician Kim Jae-gyun (김재균) criticized that the government and other regional political groups illegally extorted 1 billion Korean won for the project. The Korea Water Resources Corporation plans to increase the price of tap water every year to recover a huge loss of financial resources on the project. There has been too much money spending on the opening ceremonies of the four main weirs, promoted by Lee Myung-bak. South Korean philosopher, Do-ol had voiced his opinion in the online talk show Naneun Ggomsuda on October 29, 2011, by saying "The whole land is dug up. Even Yeonsangun didn't harm the land around this level. Does it make sense that collecting every taxpayers' money is to dig up the bottom of rivers? This project is a waste that doesn't create any money nor any national asset." There is a concern that sediments such as sands are recollecting under the rivers, such as Nakdong River. The government has allocated too much of the financial resources into the government-led promotion of the project. The People's Institute of Economical & Social Studies (시민경제사회연구소) has predicted that 4900 billion Korean won would be needed every year to maintain the weirs and surrounding facilities.

=== Illegal and undemocratic conventions ===
In spite of numerous environmental and socioeconomic problems, Certain environment agencies has said The Four Major Rivers Project carried out by the Lee Myung-bak government has ignored many legal and democratic procedures that were required for the project. This is due to the fact that President Lee Myung-bak himself has deeper connections and business-friendly attitudes to big private construction businesses. In May 2011, a private contractor of the project, GS Construction, had illegally stopped civilian environmental inspectors.

South Korean conservative legal professor, Lee Sang-don criticized conservative newspapers for censoring the plight and the problems of this projects as well as hinting many problems with the Lee Myung-bak government in his book Silent Revolution.

The Suwon District Court ordered three farmers to pay fine for disrupting against this government-led project on late March 2011 - later the farmers protested.

The Busan High Court declared that the government-led Four Major Rivers Project is illegal on February 10, 2012.

==== PR issues ====
The project PR department had conducted field trips for SNU students and had ignored or deflect criticisms from them. President Lee Myung-bak officially mentioned how this project prevented flooding in 2011, however citizens groups centered in Daegu demanded to stop the opening ceremonies of the new river-based facilities and to compensate the flood damages caused by the project.

==== Political Intentions ====
The official completion ceremony of the Four Major Rivers Project is later postponed to March 2012 as declared on November 29, 2011, due to "safety reasons"; this is alleged to be the Grand National Party's promotional strategy for the river project right before the 2012 presidential election in order to avoid the anti-KORUS Free Trade Agreement crowds (Democratic Party members, farmers, citizen groups).

== Audits ==
The Audit Office conducted three audits of the Four Major Rivers Project. The following is a summary of the audit report.

=== 1st Audit - January 2011 Myung-bak Lee Government ===
In the first audit, it was found that the business was progressing smoothly on the whole. There is no particular problem with the controversy that rivers are managed more safely in the flood than in the past and that the legal process has not been implemented during the project process. However, there are some small examples, confirming the results of audit on January 21, 2011, and requested or dispose of 20 items in total, including 29 cases.

The main problems are that the scale of the river repair work can be changed to save the project cost, but it has not been changed, it is necessary to secure additional dimensional stability in some rivers, There was a case in which discrimination occurred and the amount of contract was increased and the stability period was shortened without securing sufficient stability and damages the stability of the dam.

Therefore, the Ministry of Land Development said that 10 items have already been completed for 20 items, 9 items are being implemented, or the action will be completed within 1 to 2 months.

=== 2nd audit - January 2013 Myung-Bak Lee government ===
Until the completion of major projects of the 4 Rivers Project, the controversy about the stability of main facilities, water pollution, and appropriateness of maintenance method was continuously raised. We have been grateful for the quality and quality management of the main facilities of the 4 Rivers Project, and many problems have begun to be revealed. Inadequate water quality management method, Inadequate dredging management plan, Unsatisfactory management of water quality management plan, Inadequate management and inspection, Inadequate management and inspection, And so on.

=== 3rd Audit - July 2013 Geun-hye Park Government ===
In June 2012, the Fair Trade Commission announced the results of bidding for the four-river rescue project, but it was delayed arbitrarily, and the Ministry of Land, Infrastructure and Transport refused to accept it. The Ministry of Land, and the Fair Trade Commission conducted audits focusing on 'appropriateness of first turnkey collusion processing and response', 'whether second and third person processing turnkey collusion', 'lowest price bidding absurdity' and so on.

As a result of the investigation, problems such as improper handling of the collusion case by the Fair Trade Commission and provision of a fixed bail in the Ministry of Land were found, and problems such as illegal fixing were also revealed in the second turnkey construction and the construction of the lowest bidder.

=== 4th Audit ===
On June 13, 2017, The Audit Office decided to conduct a fourth audit.
