= Lee Myung-bak =

President of South Korea from 2008 to 2013

Lee Myung-bak GOM OSP OGE OMRI OZ RE RSerafO BRI
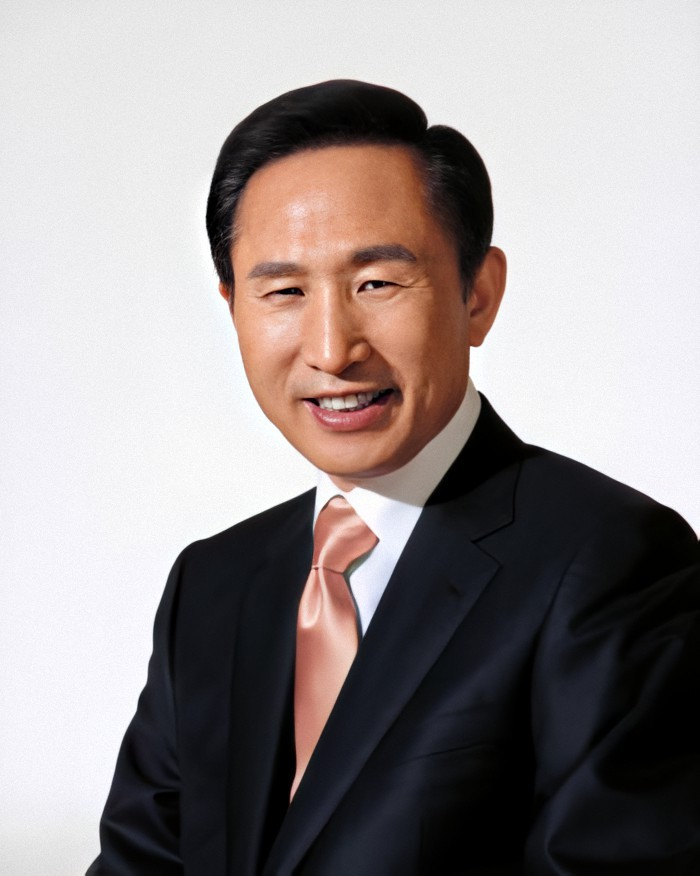
- Official portrait, 2008

10th President of South Korea
- In office 25 February 2008 – 24 February 2013
- Prime Minister: Han Duck-soo; Han Seung-soo; Chung Un-chan; Yoon Jeung-hyun (acting); Kim Hwang-sik
- Preceded by: Roh Moo-hyun
- Succeeded by: Park Geun-hye

32nd Mayor of Seoul
- In office 1 July 2002 – 30 June 2006
- President: Roh Moo-hyun
- Preceded by: Goh Kun
- Succeeded by: Oh Se-hoon

Member of the National Assembly
- In office 30 May 1996 – 21 February 1998
- Preceded by: Lee Jong-chan
- Succeeded by: Roh Moo-hyun
- Constituency: Jongno (Seoul)
- In office 30 May 1992 – 29 May 1996
- Constituency: Proportional representation

Personal details
- Born: 19 December 1941 (age 84) Osaka, Empire of Japan
- Party: Independent (since 2017)
- Other political affiliations: Saenuri (2012–2017); Grand National (1997–2012); New Korea (1995–1997); Democratic Liberal (1992–1995)
- Spouse: Kim Yoon-ok (m. 1970)
- Children: 4
- Relatives: Lee Sang-deuk (brother)
- Education: Korea University (BBA)
- Criminal information
- Status: Pardoned by President Yoon Suk Yeol on 27 December 2022 (3 years ago)
- Convictions: Bribery; Embezzlement
- Penalty: 17 years imprisonment, fine of ₩13 billion and forfeiture of ₩5.78 billion

Details
- Date apprehended: 22 March 2018

Korean name
- Hangul: 이명박
- Hanja: 李明博
- RR: I Myeongbak
- MR: I Myŏngbak

Art name
- Hangul: 일송
- Hanja: 一松
- RR: Ilsong
- MR: Ilsong

Japanese name
- Japanese: 月山明博
- Romanization: Tsukiyama Akihiro

Lee Myung-bak (pronounced /ˌmjʌŋ ˈbɑːk/; Korean: 이명박; pronounced [i.mjʌŋ.bak̚]; born 19 December 1941) is a South Korean politician and business executive who served as the 17th president of South Korea from 2008 to 2013. A member of the then Saenuri Party, he was the mayor of Seoul from 2002 to 2006. Before entering politics, he was the chief executive officer of Hyundai Engineering and Construction.

Born in Osaka during the Empire of Japan, Lee graduated from Korea University. He is married to Kim Yoon-ok and has three daughters and one son. His older brother, Lee Sang-deuk, was a South Korean politician. He is a Christian attending Somang Presbyterian Church. In 2011, Lee received an honorary degree from Paris Diderot University.

Lee altered the South Korean government's approach to North Korea, preferring a more hardline strategy in the wake of increased provocation from the North, though he was supportive of regional dialogue with Russia, China and Japan. Under Lee, South Korea increased its visibility and influence in the global scene, resulting in the hosting of the 2010 G-20 Seoul summit. However, significant controversy remains in Korea regarding high-profile government initiatives which have caused some factions to engage in civil opposition and protest against the incumbent government and President Lee's Saenuri Party (formerly the Grand National Party). The reformist faction within the Saenuri Party was at odds with Lee. He ended his five-year term on 24 February 2013, and was succeeded by Park Geun-hye.

On 22 March 2018, Lee was arrested on charges of bribery, embezzlement, and tax evasion alleged to have occurred during his presidency. Prosecutors accused Lee of receiving bribes totaling 11 billion won and channeling assets of 35 billion won to an illicit slush fund. Shortly before his arrest, Lee posted a handwritten statement on Facebook denying the charges. Lee's arrest occurred roughly a year after the arrest of former president Park Geun-Hye, who was arrested on charges stemming from the 2016 South Korean political scandal. Lee was convicted on 5 October 2018 and sentenced to 15 years in prison. On 29 October 2020, the Korean Supreme Court upheld a 17-year sentence against Lee given to him by an appellate court. On 27 December 2022, President Yoon Suk-yeol granted Lee a special pardon, cancelling the remaining 15 years of the sentence.

== Early life and education ==
Lee Myung-bak (Japanese name: Akihiro Tsukiyama (月山明博)) was born 19 December 1941, in Osaka, Japan. His parents emigrated to Japan in 1929, nineteen years after the Japanese annexation of Korea. Lee's father, Lee Chung-u (이충우; 李忠雨), was employed as a farm labourer in rural Japan, and his mother, Chae Tae-won (채태원; 蔡太元), was a housewife. He was the fifth of seven children.

In 1945, after the end of World War II, his family returned to his father's hometown of Pohang, in North Gyeongsang Province, then an American-occupied portion of the Korean Peninsula. Lee's sister, Lee Ki-sun, believed that they smuggled themselves into the country to avoid having the officials confiscate the property they acquired in Japan. However, their ship was wrecked off the coast of Tsushima island. They lost all their belongings and barely survived. Lee personally witnessed the deaths of his older sister and a younger brother, who were killed in the bombardment of Pohang, during the Korean War.

Lee attended night school at Dongji Commercial High School in Pohang and received a scholarship. A year after graduation, Lee gained admission to Korea University. In 1964, during his third year in college, Lee was elected president of the student council. That year, Lee participated in student demonstrations against President Park Chung Hee's Seoul-Tokyo Talks, taking issue with Japanese restitution for the colonization of the Korean Peninsula. He was charged with plotting insurrection and was sentenced to five years' probation and three years' imprisonment by the Supreme Court of Korea. He served a little under three months of his sentence at the Seodaemun Prison in Seoul.

In his autobiography, Lee wrote that he was discharged from Korea's mandatory military service due to a diagnosis of acute bronchiectasis while at the Nonsan Training Facility.

== Business career ==
In 1965, Lee started work at Hyundai Construction, the company which was awarded Korea's first-ever overseas construction project, a $5.2 million contract to build the Pattani-Narathiwat Highway in Thailand. Shortly after he was hired by the company, Lee was sent to Thailand to participate in the project, which was successfully completed in March 1968. Lee returned to Korea and was subsequently given charge of Hyundai's heavy machinery plant in Seoul.

It was during his three decades with the Hyundai Group that Lee earned the nickname "Raging Bulldozer". On one occasion, he completely dismantled and put back a bulldozer to study how it worked.

Lee became a company director at the age of 29, five years after he joined the company. He later became the CEO at age 35, becoming Korea's youngest CEO in history. In 1988, he was named chairman of Hyundai Construction at the age of 47.

When he began work at Hyundai in 1965, the company had 90 employees; when he left as chairman 27 years later, it had more than 160,000. Soon after the successful completion of the Pattani-Narathiwat Highway by Hyundai Construction, Korea's construction industry began to focus its efforts on encouraging the creation of new markets in countries such as Vietnam and the Middle East. Following the decline of construction demands from Vietnam in the 1960s, Hyundai Construction turned its focus toward the Middle East. The company continued to be a major player in construction projects with the successful completion of international projects including the Arab Shipbuilding & Repair Yard, the Diplomatic Hotel in Bahrain, and the Jubail Industrial Harbor Projects in Saudi Arabia, also known as "the great history of the 20th century". At that time, the value of orders received by the Korean construction company exceeded US$10 billion, which contributed to overcoming the national crisis resulting from the oil shock.

== Early political career ==
In 1992, Lee made the transition from business to politics, leaving Hyundai after a 27-year career. He joined the Democratic Liberal Party instead of the Unification National Party, founded by Chung Ju-yung. He was elected as a member of the 14th Korean National Assembly (for Proportional representation). Upon his election, he stated that he ran for the office because "after watching Mikhail Gorbachev change the world, I wanted to see if I could do the same." In 1995, he ran for the city of Seoul's mayoral election, but lost to former prime minister Chung Won-sik during the primary of the Democratic Liberal Party.

In 1996, Lee was reelected as a member of the Korean National Assembly, representing Jongno District, Seoul. One of his opponents was future president Roh Moo-hyun, who ranked third.

In 1999, Lee was a visiting scholar at the George Washington University, in Washington, DC.

Into his second-term, his former secretary Kim Yoo-chan disclosed that Lee had spent excessively in his election campaign, often at the expense of taxpayers outside of his district. After receiving US$18,000 from Lee, Kim wrote a letter reversing his disclosure and fled to Tajikistan. Lee resigned in 1998 before being fined US$6.5 million for breaking election law and forcing Kim to flee. In the by-election held after his resignation, Roh Moo-hyun was elected as his successor.

=== Mayor of Seoul ===
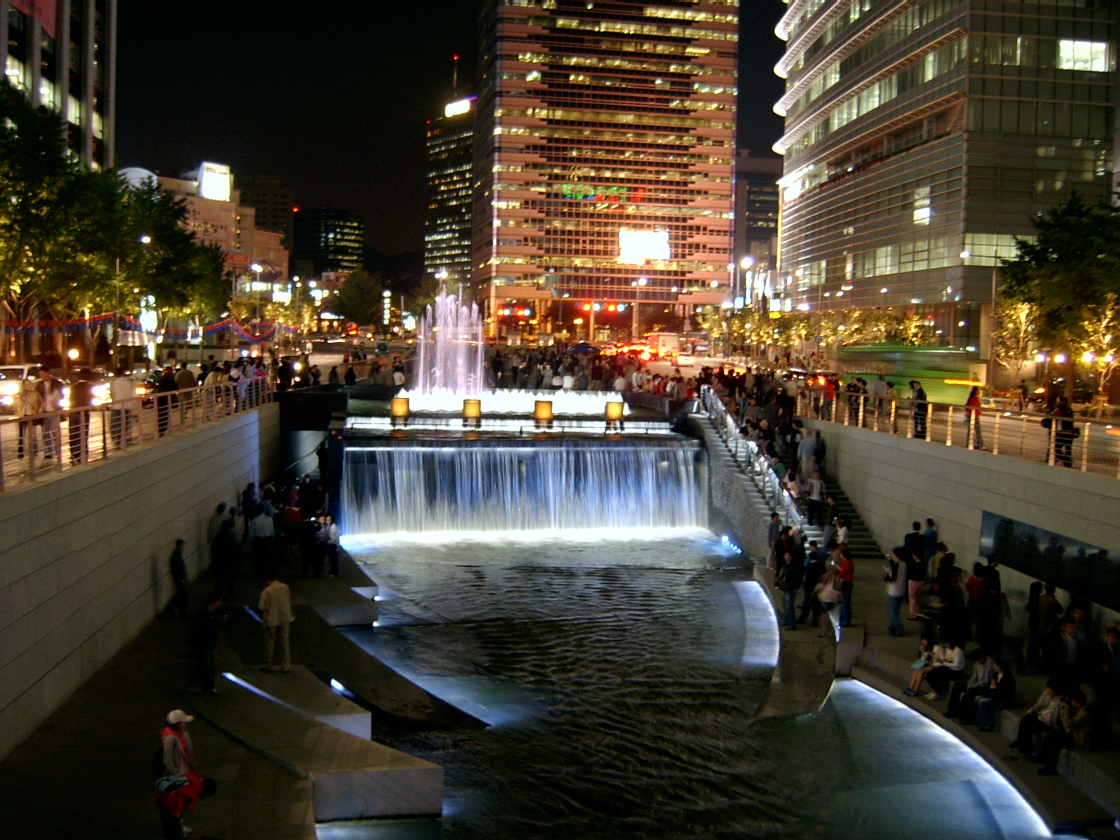
Cheonggyecheon at night

In 2002, Lee ran for mayor of Seoul and won. As mayor some of Lee's projects included the restoration of the Cheonggyecheon stream, the creation of Seoul Forest, the opening of Seoul Forest Park, the construction of a grassy field in front of Seoul City Hall, and the addition of bus rapid transit to the city's transportation system. His administration transformed the area around Seoul City Hall from a concrete traffic circle to a public lawn for gatherings.

The Live Music Camp incident occurred in 2005, during his reign. Lee suggested that Hongdae concerts be regulated by authorities, which prompted political rivals to compare Lee to former dictator Park Chung Hee. Minister of Culture Yu In-chon convinced him not to do so. Following discussions with indie bands, Lee's administration reconciled with the artists and simultaneously pledged support for the indie music scene, aiming to foster a more vibrant cultural environment in Seoul.

During his mayoral tenure, he generally received positive evaluations, and even after a long period, he is still regarded as one of the greatest mayors in Seoul's history.

== 2007 presidential election ==
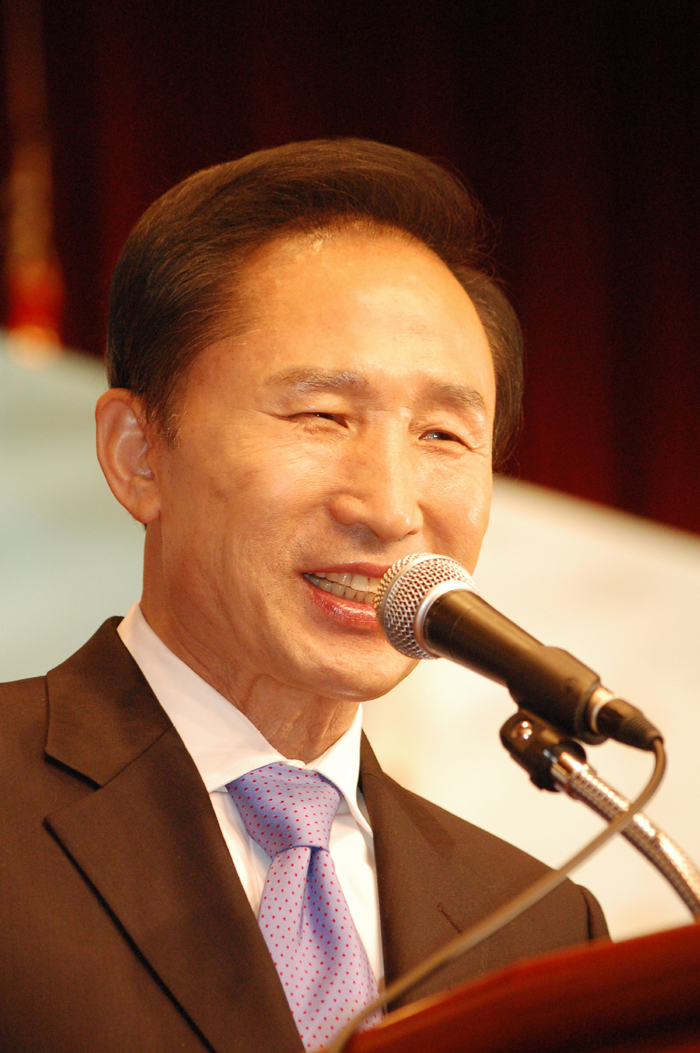
Lee Myung-bak speaking to public in 2007

On 10 May 2007, Lee officially declared his intention to seek the nomination of the Grand National Party (GNP) as its presidential candidate. On 20 August 2007, he defeated Park Geun-hye in the GNP's primary to become the party's nominee for the 2007 presidential election. During the primary, Lee was accused of profiting from illegal speculation on land owned in Dogok-dong, an expensive neighborhood in Seoul. However, in August 2007, the prosecutors said in the interim announcement, "We do suspect Lee's brother's claim over the land in Dogok-dong, but have failed to verify the real owner of the asset." On 28 September 2007, the prosecutory authority officially dropped the suspicion that the Dogok land was under a borrowed name, announcing, "We have done all necessary investigations, including tracing the proceeds from the sale of the land and call history, and now got to the bottom of this case." In December 2007, a few days before the presidential election, Lee announced that he would donate all of his assets to society.

Lee's stated goals were expressed in the "747 Plan" and included: 7% annual growth in gross domestic product (GDP), US$40,000 per capita, and transforming Korea into the world's seventh largest economy. An important part of his platform was the Grand Korean Waterway (한반도 대운하) project from Busan to Seoul, which he believed would lead to an economic revival. His political opponents criticized the project, saying it was unrealistic and too costly to be realized. Others were concerned about possible negative environmental impact.

Signaling a departure from his previous views on North Korea, Lee announced a plan to "engage" North Korea through investment. He promised to form a consultative body with the North to discuss furthering economic ties. The body would have subcommittees on the economy, education, finance, infrastructure and welfare, and a cooperation fund of $40 billion. He promised to seek a Korean Economic Community agreement to establish the legal and systemic framework for any projects emerging from the negotiations, and called for the formation of an aid office in North Korea as a way of decoupling humanitarian aid from nuclear talks.

His foreign policy initiative was called MB Doctrine, which advocates "engaging" North Korea and strengthening the US-Korean alliance.

=== BBK scandal ===
During the 2007 presidential election, questions about his relationship with a company called BBK were raised. In 1999, Lee was alleged to have met an American and established the LKE Bank with him. However, this enterprise went bankrupt less than a year later. The corrupt Korean prosecutors manipulated BBK case so that Lee was found not to be guilty. However, in 2018 Lee was arrested for charges related to BBK. Although, the prosecutor claimed in 2007 that Lee had nothing to do with DAS, a corporation that funded BBK, in 2018 the same prosecution office found that DAS is owned and controlled by Lee.

== Presidency (2008–2013) ==
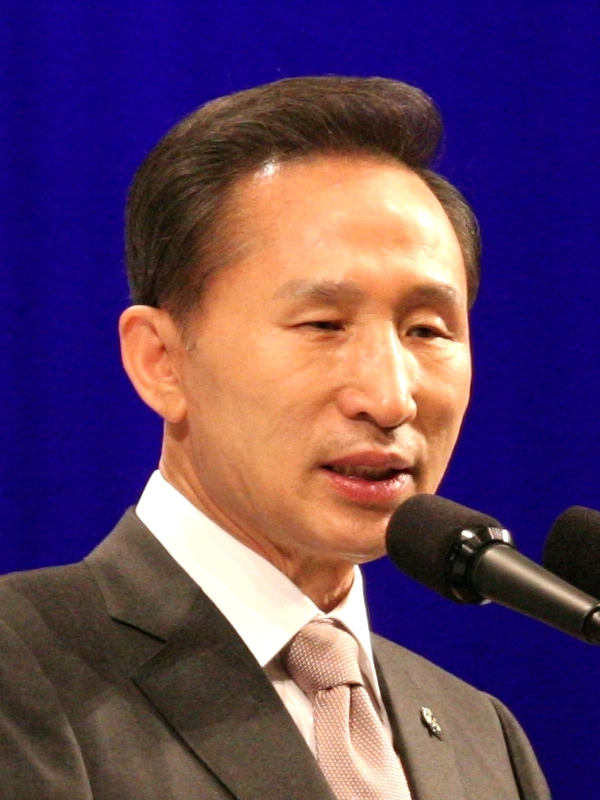
- Presidency of Lee Myung-bak; 25 February 2008 – 25 February 2013
- Prime Minister: Han Seung-soo; Chung Un-chan; Kim Hwang-sik
- Cabinet: Full list
- Party: Saenuri
- Election: 2007
- Seat: Seoul

In spite of the lowest voter turnout ever for a presidential election in South Korea, Lee won the presidential election in December 2007 with 48.7% of the vote which was considered a landslide. He finished with a nearly 2-to-1 margin over his nearest challenger, Chung Dong-young of the Grand Unified Democratic New Party. To date, it is the largest margin of victory since the resumption of direct presidential elections in 1987. He took the oath of office on 25 February 2008, vowing to revitalize the economy, strengthen relations with the United States and "deal with" North Korea. Specifically, Lee declared that he would pursue a campaign of "global diplomacy" and seek further cooperative exchanges with regional neighbors Japan, China, and Russia. He further pledged to strengthen South Korea–United States relations and implement a tougher policy with regard to North Korea, ideas that are promoted as the MB Doctrine.

Lee stated that he wanted to restore better relations with the United States through a greater emphasis on free market solutions.

Two months after his inauguration, Lee's approval ratings stood at 28%, and by June 2008 they had reached 17%. U.S. President George W. Bush and Lee also discussed the ratification of the South Korea–United States Free Trade Agreement or KORUS FTA, which faced opposition from legislators in both countries. While Lee's agreement during the summit to partially lift the ban on US beef imports was expected to remove the obstacles in approving the KORUS FTA in the US, many Koreans protested the resumption of U.S. beef imports.

According to The Wall Street Journal, Lee's plan to privatize public companies was a modest but "perhaps important step" toward reform.

As the government gained more stability, the approval rating of Lee's administration rose to 32.8%. Since the resumption of U.S. beef imports, more people are buying U.S. beef and now it has the second largest market share in Korea, after Australian beef. Since then, the opinion that concerns about mad cow disease, which caused opposition to U.S. beef imports, have been greatly exaggerated became mainstream.

Lee's approval ratings reflected public perception of Korea's economic situation in the wake of the global economic meltdown. Signs of a strengthening economy and a landmark $40 billion deal won by a Korean consortium to build nuclear power plants in the United Arab Emirates boosted Lee's popularity. His approval rating in January 2010 stood at 51.6%.

As of late 2011, Lee's administration had a series of corruption allegations surrounding certain high-ranking government employees.

=== Education policy ===
The Lee administration introduced a tailor-made educational system and established the National Scholarship Foundation, which offers services such as student loans and loan counseling. In addition, the government promoted an income contingency pay-later plan to help out those struggling to pay tuition fees. The income-contingent loan program, implemented in 2010, allowed students to repay tuition loans after securing sufficient income, thereby reducing the financial burden on students from low-income families.

Teachers were highly critical of these changes, arguing that Lee wanted to turn Korean education into a "free market," while ignoring the underfunding of education in regions outside the Seoul area. However, the government designated 82 well-performing high schools in rural areas as "public boarding schools" and granted funds amounting to 317 billion won in total, with 3.8 billion won each on average.

The Lee government planned to use a pool of young Korean Americans for the promotion of after-school English education in public schools in rural areas, with the aim to improve the quality of education. Prior to assuming the presidency, Lee's transition team announced it would implement a nationwide English-immersion program to provide students with the language tools necessary to be successful in a highly globalized world. Under this program, all classes would have been taught in English by 2010. However, Lee abandoned the program after facing strong opposition from parents, teachers, and education specialists. He then attempted to implement a program where all English courses in middle and secondary schools would be taught in English only, which would require the government to educate many teachers in Korea and recruit university students studying abroad in English-speaking countries.

=== Economic policy ===
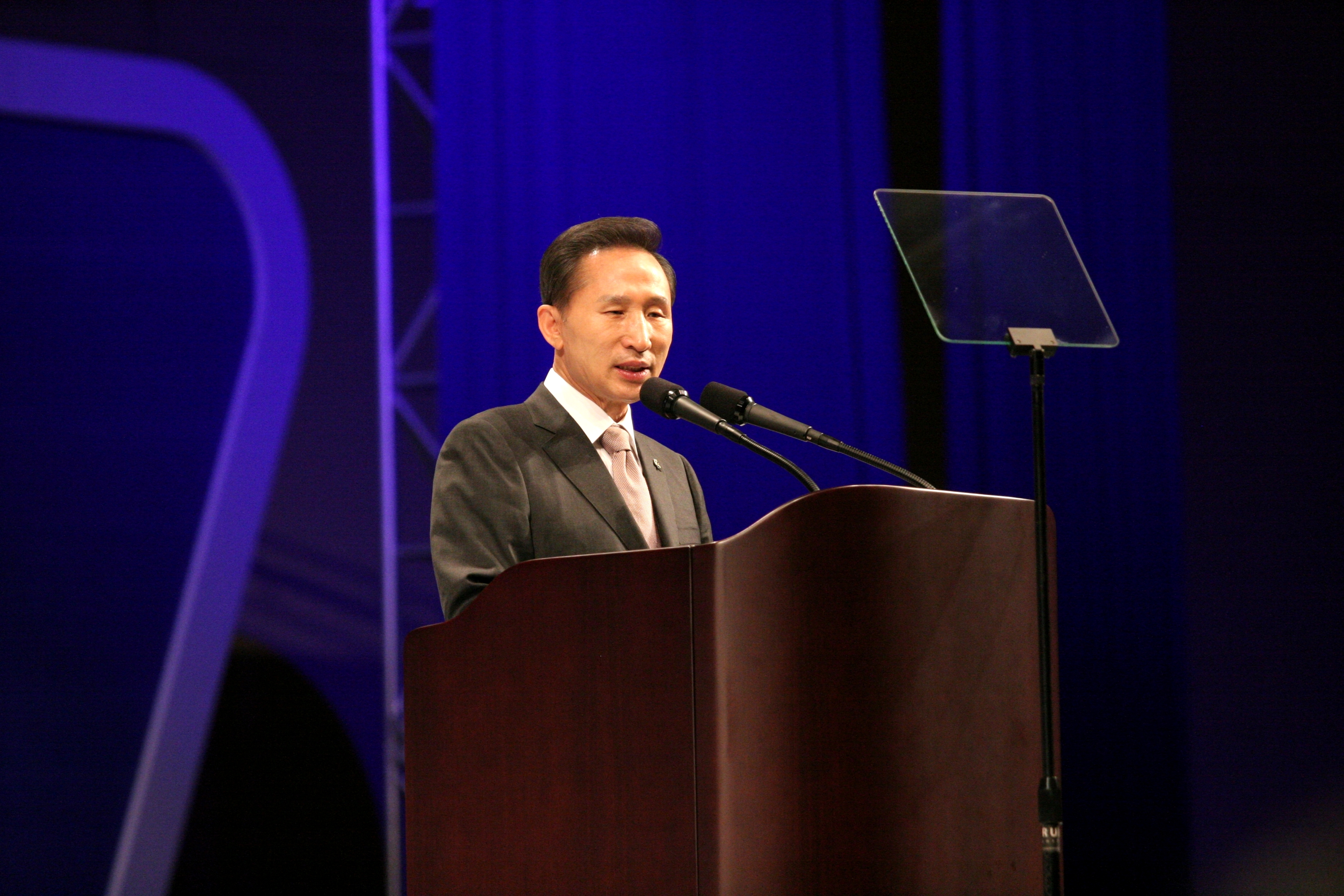
Lee Myung-bak at his opening address of the OECD ministerial meeting "The Future of the Internet economy" in Seoul in June 2008

"Mbnomics" is the term applied to Lee's macroeconomic policy. The term is a portmanteau derived by combining his initials (Myung-bak, Mb) and the term economics (-nomics) to form "Mbnomics". Kang Man-Soo, the Minister of Strategy and Finance, is credited with coining the term and the design of Mbnomics.

The centerpiece of Lee's economic revitalization was his "Korea 7·4·7" plan. The plan took its name from its goals: to bring 7% economic growth during his term, raise Korea's per capita income to US$40,000, and make Korea the world's seventh largest economy. As Lee put it, his government is mandated with creating a new Korea where "the people are affluent, society is warm and the state strong." To this end, he planned to follow a pragmatic, market-friendly strategy: smart market economy, empirical pragmatism, and democratic activism.

Lee wanted to move to low-carbon growth in coming decades. The government hoped to be a bridge between rich and poor countries in fighting global warming by setting itself goals for reductions in greenhouse gas emissions to be achieved by 2020. In connection with the recent financial shock from the United States, President Lee emphasized the importance of solid cooperation between political and business circles. He proposed a tripartite meeting among the finance ministers of South Korea, Japan, and China aimed at coordinating policies to cope with the credit crisis.

Around early 2011, Mbnomics gained a negative reputation due to tax reduction plans for the rich, the failure to privatize or merge large banks, and failure to provide affordable housing. The middle-aged and senior Korean population usually supported Lee Myung-bak. However, businesspeople in their 50s–60s in the construction and real estate sectors withdrew their support of Lee after the 2010 regional election and 2012 presidential election.

Oh Geon-ho (오건호), the head of the Public Policy Institute for People, criticized parts of Mbnomics as "over-financing big private companies" and "worsening the fiscal state of the country".

On 7 September 2011, the Blue House officially scrapped plans for a rich tax deduction, marking the foundational end of Mbnomics.

=== Canal ===
The Grand Korean Waterway, officially known as the Pan Korea Grand Waterway, is a proposed 540-kilometer (340 mi) long canal, traversing difficult mountainous terrain, connecting Seoul and Busan, two of South Korea's largest cities. The canal would run diagonally across the country, connecting the Han River, which flows through Seoul into the Yellow Sea, to the Nakdong River, which flows through Busan into the Korea Strait.

Few opponents of the project argue that, during the construction process, damage to the environment could be caused by the concrete facility. However, one study states that when environmentally friendly methods of construction (like "swamp-restoration") are adopted, there will be a net positive effect (such as improving the Han River). Buddhist groups have voiced fears that it would submerge nearby Buddhist relics, which would cause irreparable damage to a significant portion of Korea's cultural legacy. On the other hand, some say that once the Kyungboo Canal is developed, another 177 cultural assets could be discovered during excavations, which could be used for a tourist attraction. In particular, the development of the canal would increase the accessibility to cultural assets that are far to reach, and hence more efficient management of those assets would be possible. Lee's promise to build the Grand Korean Waterway stalled due to low public opinion.

If successful, Lee maintained that his plan, which would include dredging and other measures to improve Korea's waterways, would decrease water pollution, and bring economic benefits to local communities. Speaking in 2005 about the project, Lee said, "Many journalists questioned me why I keep commenting on the building of the canal. However, it's a simple fact that many cities around the world were benefited by making the best use of their rivers and seas." At a special conference held on 19 June 2008, President Lee announced that he would drop the Grand Canal project if the public opposed the idea, and the premier confirmed this statement on 8 September 2008. Despite this assurance, many now accuse Lee of continuing the canal plan under the guise of "maintenance of the 4 great rivers (4대강 정비사업)."

==== Inspections ====
Such worries and accusations against the pre-electorate reactionism have been proven anything but dichotomy or groundless sabotaging, mainly through official pronouncements by the Korean Board of Audit and Inspection as well as numerous main media. In its investigation reports issued post-presidency was confirmed governmental documents had been found to contain the original waterway plan of the pre-election campaign under the altered rubric: "river overhaul". It also confirmed regarding the target minimum depth for dredging that the 4 to 5 meter order had been from the president himself still much interested in the canal.

=== Overseas Resources Development ===
In its first year, 2008, the government more than doubled spending on the overseas natural resources development program, and went over triple in 2011, recording the highest in Korean history. Spearheaded by appointees, most notably then Korean congressman and brother Lee Sang-deuk, the program didn't lead to gain inter- and post- presidency alike, but jeopardized Korea National Oil Corporation, to name one of the numerous basket cases involved as of 2025, into an astronomical debt of 13.5 trillion KRW with annual interest of 600 billion arising therefrom.

=== Environmental and climate policy ===
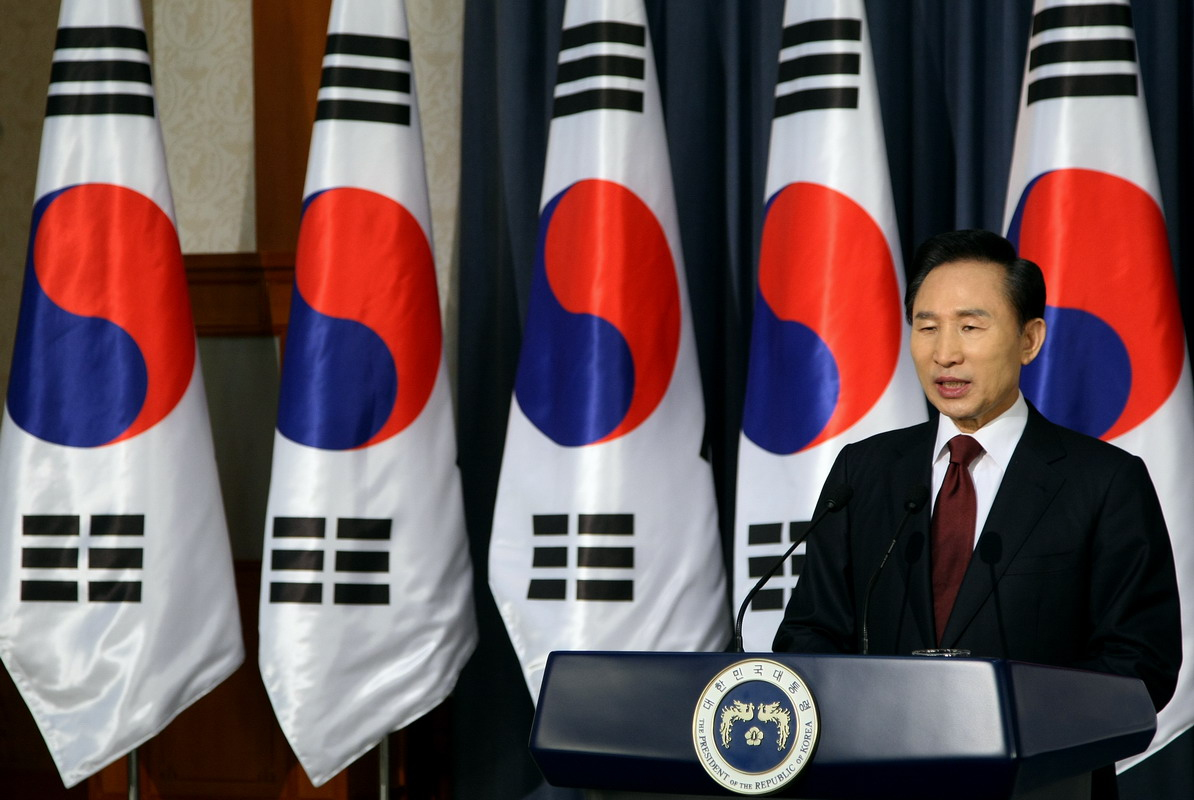
Lee Myung-bak gives New Year's address on 2009.

President Lee Myung-bak laid out an agenda for National Strategy for Green Growth and the Five-Year Plan for Green Growth in 2008. In February 2009, President Lee established the Presidential Committee on Green Growth, which absorbed the sustainable development commission and two other committees on energy and climate change under direct authority of the President. The Five-Year Plan for Green Growth laid out a 30 per cent reduction in greenhouse gas emissions by 2020 relative to a 'business-as-usual' baseline implying a 4 per cent cut from the 2005 level.

The Four Major Rivers Restoration Project was a multi-purpose green growth project on the Han River (Korea), Nakdong River, Geum River and Yeongsan River in South Korea. The project was spearheaded by South Korean President Lee Myung-bak and was declared complete on 21 October 2011. The restoration project's aims were to provide or improve water security, improve flood control, and restore ecosystem vitality. It was first announced as part of the "Green New Deal" policy launched in January 2009, and was later included in the government's five-year national plan in July 2009. The government estimated its full investment and funding totaled 22.2 trillion won (approximately US$17.3 billion).

Although, former president Lee claimed that the Four Major Rivers Restoration Project was Eco-friendly, its results face severe criticism from environmental experts both inside and outside of the government. It is well described in the report in Hankyoreh, August 2013. The algae known to kill eco system of a river proliferated during summer season for many years and experts suspect it is because of weirs that slow or stop water flow. Furthermore, water quality near the Nakdong river deteriorated significantly after weirs were installed. The government already spent more than 3 trillion Korean won to keep the water potable as of August 2013.

=== Cabinet ===
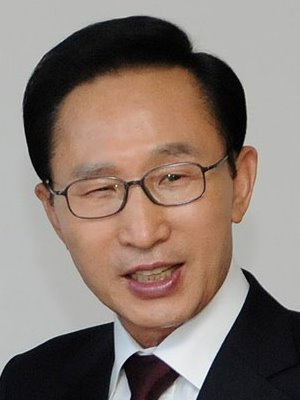
Lee at APEC on 13 November 2010

Lee Myung-bak faced strong criticism over his choice of political appointees, many of whom were wealthy. The concern was that Lee's appointees would favor policies that protect the rich, while failing to address the needs of the underprivileged. Another criticism was that these appointees have mostly chosen from the nation's southeast region (North Gyeongsang Province and South Gyeongsang Province), which is known as a GNP stronghold.

While the fact that the property owned by high officials, including ministers, increased on average, most of them were legally-obtained and inherited property. Those ministers involved in the allegation of illegal real-estate speculation were already replaced. Hence, the average property owned by the three replaced ministers were only 1.7 billion won. To set aside the alleged regional bias, Lee's first cabinet appointment procedure faithfully abided by the principles and rules by appointing four from Seoul and Yeongnam district, three from Honam, Gangwon, and Chungcheong province, and one from North Korea.

Moreover, Lee's administration increased the welfare budget by 9% to help the poorest maintain the living and middle class's stability, and pursued many more policies for the benefit of the public than the former government. His administration further claimed that the tax reforms undertaken, including the comprehensive property tax cut was not to benefit the wealthy and the haves, but to correct a wrongful tax according to the market principle. Lee also had to face corruption charges leveled at his administration. Three appointees resigned amid suspicions of corruption, and his top intelligence chief and anticorruption aide faced accusations that they received bribes from The Samsung Group. Both Samsung and Lee denied the charges. Those involved in the allegation of receiving bribes from Samsung group have been cleared of charges after special prosecutory investigation.

On 7 July 2008, Lee named Ahn Byong-man, a presidential advisor for state future planning, as his new minister of education, science and technology. Jang Tae-pyoung, a former secretary general of the Korea Independent Commission Against Corruption, became minister of food, agriculture, forestry and fisheries, and Grand National Party lawmaker Jeon Jae-hee minister of health, welfare and family affairs. In addition, Lee gave Prime Minister Han Seung-soo another chance in the belief that no proper working conditions had been provided for the cabinet due to many pending issues since the inauguration of the new administration.

=== Foreign policy ===
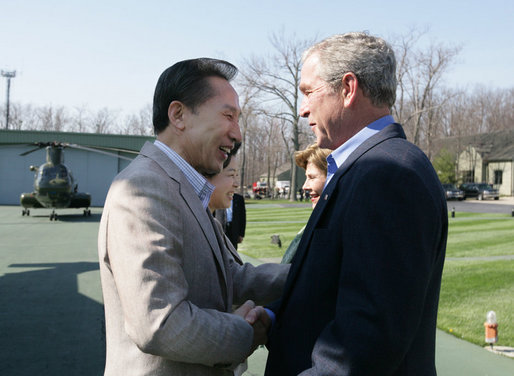
Lee shakes hands with United States President George W. Bush upon his arrival at Camp David, Maryland, United States, 18 April 2008.

Lee was widely considered to be pro-U.S. In mid-April 2008, Lee traveled to the United States for his first official overseas visit to meet with U.S. President George W. Bush at the White House and Camp David. Lee's more aggressive approach towards North Korea was described as a welcome change for Bush.

The government's stance towards North Korea was not to violate the agreement made between the heads of the two Koreas, but to mull over the economic feasibility and realizable possibility through negotiation based on mutual trust and respect, and prioritizing going forward with the project.

During a press conference, the two leaders expressed hope that North Korea would disclose the details of their nuclear weapons program, and pledged their commitment to resolve the issue through the multilateral six-party talks. Lee also gave assurances that both the U.S. and South Korea would use dialogue to end the crisis.

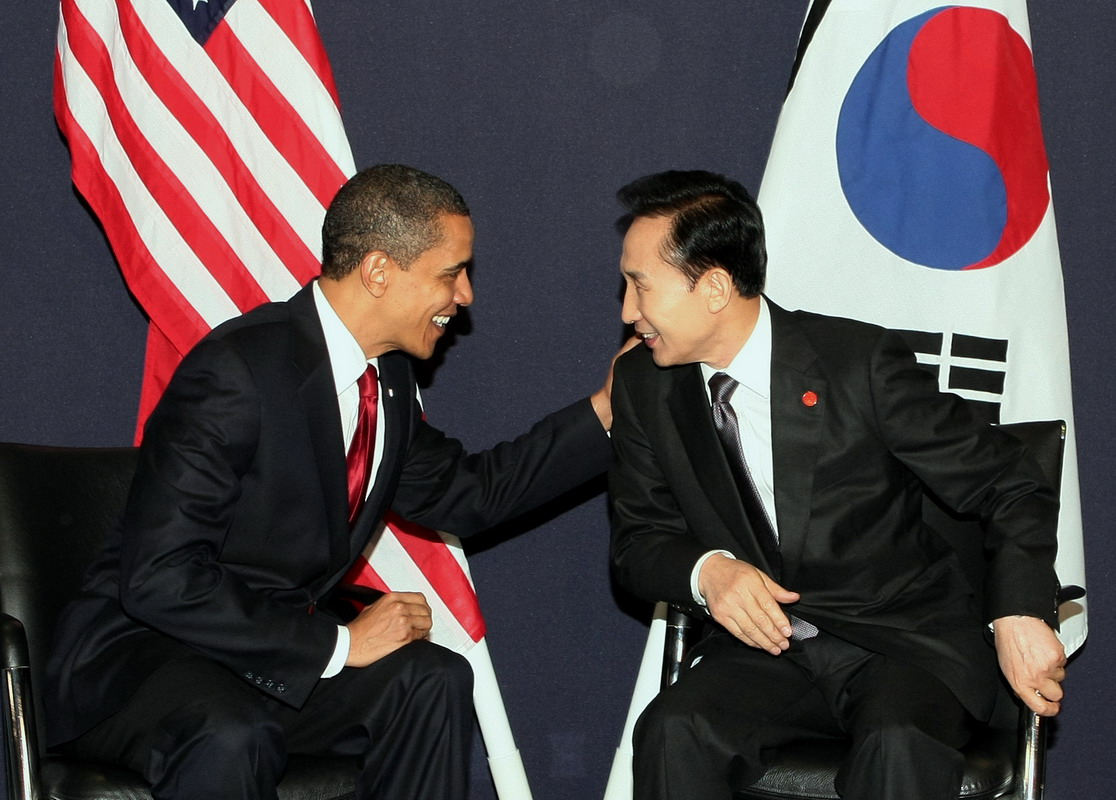
U.S. President Barack Obama meeting with President Lee Myung-bak at the G20 summit on 2 April 2009 in London

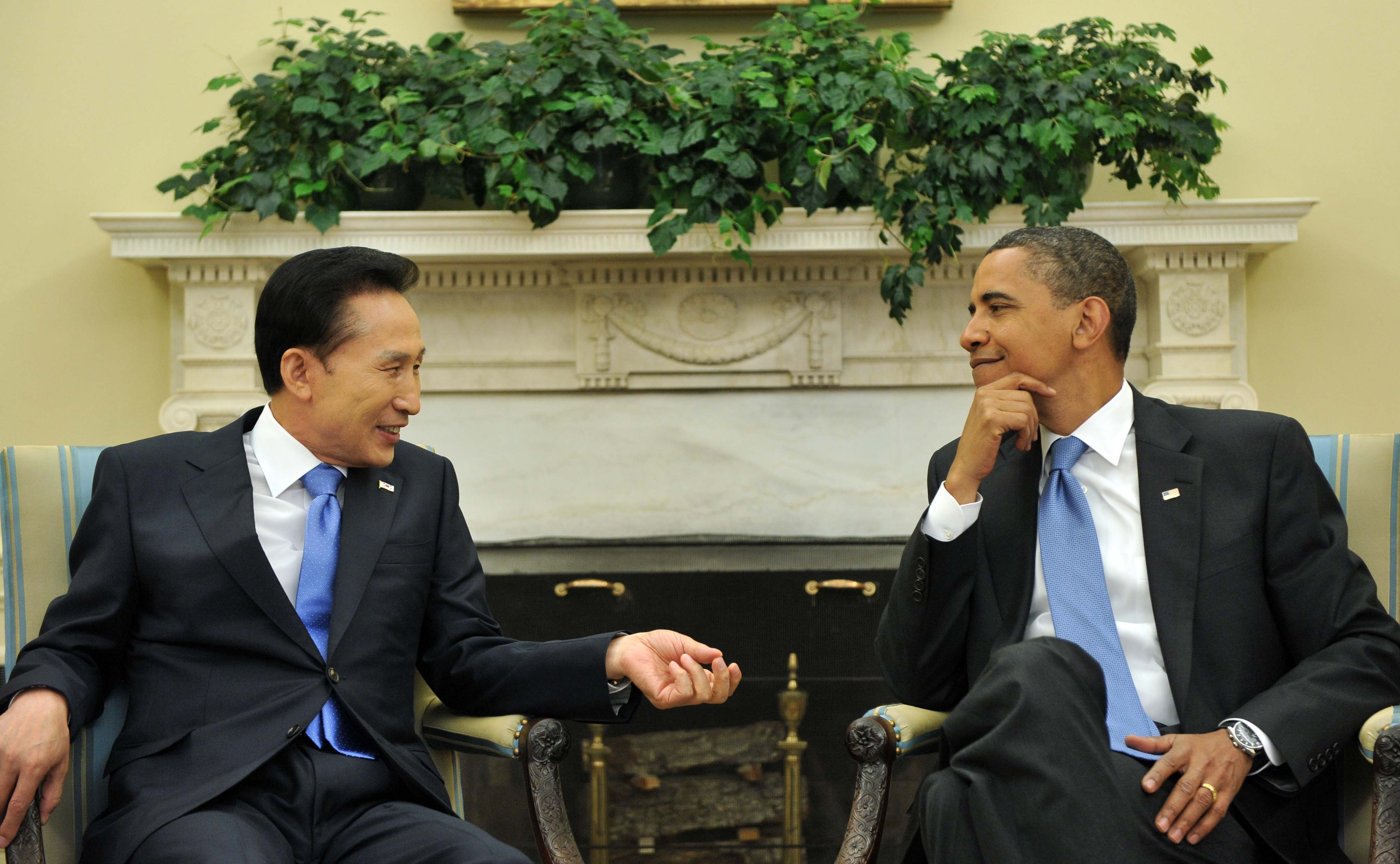
President Lee Myung-bak visiting the United States to hold summit talks with U.S. President Barack Obama on 2009

Multiple news outlets have remarked upon the apparently close friendship between Lee and U.S. President Barack Obama. Despite Lee's wavering support at home, Lee's leadership was lauded by Obama at the 2009 G-20 London summit, where Obama called South Korea "[one of America's] closest allies and greatest friends." Obama and Lee agreed on a need "for a stern, united response from the international community" in light of North Korea's efforts toward a threatened satellite launch. Lee accepted an invitation by Obama to visit the United States on 16 June 2009. President Obama hosted Lee for a day-long state visit and state dinner on 13 October 2011.

Lee also played a role in bringing about the normalization of South Korea's relations with Russia. Furthermore, Lee built relationships with foreign leaders, including former Singaporean prime minister Lee Kuan Yew, Cambodian prime minister Hun Sen, former Malaysian prime minister Mahathir Mohamad, former Chinese Communist Party general secretary Jiang Zemin and former Soviet Union Communist Party general secretary Mikhail Gorbachev.

==== US beef imports ====
On 18 April 2008, Lee's administration agreed on resumption of U.S. beef imports. Previously, Korea had banned U.S. beef after a cow infected with BSE that had originated from Canada was found in Washington state. Fears that US beef imports in South Korea, in relation to the U.S.-Korea Free Trade Agreement, would cause Mad Cow disease infected beef to be imported to South Korea came to a boil in the summer of 2008.

Ten days after the deal was formally signed, MBC's current affairs program PD Note aired a multi-part episode titled "U.S. beef, is it safe from mad cow disease?" It was reported by MBC that Koreans carry a gene making them more susceptible to mad cow disease than Americans. This claim has since been retracted by MBC. MBC further devoted 15 out of 25 other news slots to publicizing the issue showing images of downer cows from England and U.S., and reporting information such as claiming that variant Creutzfeldt–Jakob disease (vCJD) is easily transmittable through methods including blood transfusions, eating instant noodles containing beef products and using cosmetics made with cow-derived collagen. People's roar in an Internet community, Agora, also helped demonstrations to demand the renegotiation of the terms of the import deal.

As public anger continued to snowball, citizens started public demonstrations. On many nights, the rallies turned into confrontations with the police. When candles had burned out and children had gone home with their parents, many protesters were often attacked by riot-control policemen.

In an interview, Agriculture Minister Chung Woon-chun said that the policy would be pursued "with the maximum prudence, as it will take time for the U.S. to grasp the situation in Korea and gather opinions inside the industry." The government's policy is to ban import of beef from older cattle "under any circumstances, either through renegotiations between governments or self-regulation by importers."

The Seoul Southern District Court ordered MBC to air a correction by the popular MBC current affairs program PD Note, saying that the report was partially wrong and exaggerated the threat of mad cow disease. The public anger towards resuming the beef deal is now regaining its composure as many people began to buy U.S. beef. The market share of U.S. beef currently stands at approximately 28.8% following Australian beef (top seller), but for 10-days prior to Korea's thanksgiving day, it was ranked the first among its competitors.

==== Relations with North Korea ====
On 4 July 2011, during a mass rally in Pyongyang, Lee and his government were strongly criticized as traitors by spokesmen for the Korean People's Army and other elements of North Korean society. The Korean People's Army called for dealing "merciless deadly blows at the enemies till they are wiped out to the last man."

His direct and tough policy towards North Korea promoted a negative image of him throughout North Korea. Lee's name became a target practice in the North Korean military as shown through the Korean Central Television on 6 March 2012. In March 2010, Lee's presidency ended the Sunshine Policy, originally planned by Kim Dae-jung to improve relations with the North.

On 5 May 2012, the Pyongyang Times newspaper published stories and pictures of Democratic People's Republic of Korea (DPRK, North Korea) workers threatening to "wipe out" the Lee clan. The workers were upset at Lee for "having defiled the DPRK's supreme dignity when all the fellow countrymen were celebrating the centenary of the birth of President Kim Il Sung."

==== Relations with Japan ====
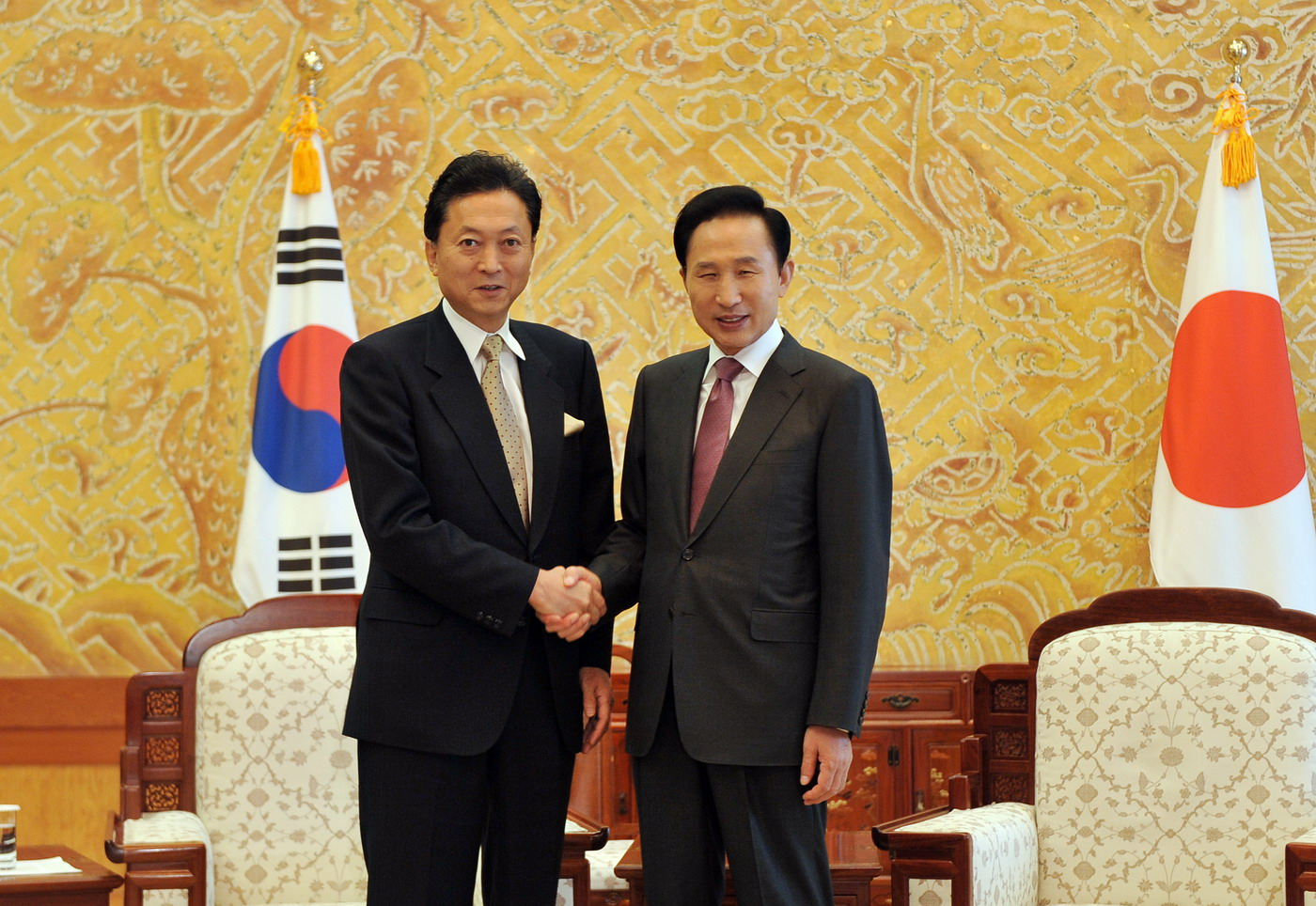
President Lee Myung-bak and Japanese Prime Minister Yukio Hatoyama held a summit meeting at Cheong Wa Dae on 9 October 2009.

Towards the end of his term in office, Lee began to take actions that caused friction between South Korea and neighboring Japan. On 10 August 2012, Lee flew to the Liancourt Rocks, known as Dokdo or Tokto (독도, literally "solitary island") in Korean, or Takeshima (たけしま/竹島; literally "bamboo island") in Japanese. He was the first Korean president to do so. Japan temporarily withdrew its ambassador to South Korea Masatoshi Muto, and Minister for Foreign Affairs Kōichirō Gemba summoned the South Korean ambassador to file a complaint and threatened to lodge a case with the International Court of Justice, (ICJ) which was rejected by South Korea. It could do so because both countries party to a dispute must agree to such ICJ cases. It was the first time for Japan to make such a move in 47 years, since Japan and South Korea officially re-established relations in 1965. Japan previously proposed bringing the issue to the ICJ in 1954 and 1964.

In a speech on 13 August 2012, Lee said that his actions were motivated by a desire to force Japan to settle the comfort women issue.

On 14 August 2012, on the eve of Liberation Day, Lee said that the Emperor of Japan Akihito should not visit Korea unless he apologized to the victims of Japan's past colonialism. He made the statement while speaking at a meeting of education officials. There were no specific plans for such a visit to take place, and Lee had previously been supportive to such a visit. Japanese Prime Minister Yoshihiko Noda and Minister for Foreign Affairs Koichiro Gemba both described the statement as "regrettable". A government official speaking to the Asahi Simbun said: "It has made it impossible for a Japanese emperor to visit South Korea for the next 100 years".

In his Liberation Day speech on 15 August 2012, Lee demanded that Japan take "responsible measures" for the comfort women, blaming Japan for violating women's human rights.

==== Diplomatic achievements ====
President Lee embraced an aggressive approach to foreign policy, driving initiatives such as Green Korea and Global Korea. President Lee conducted frequent state visits to other countries and extended invitations to foreign counterparts to visit Korea from the time he took office. In 2009 alone, Lee visited 14 countries, including the U.S. and Thailand on 11 occasions and attended 38 summits.

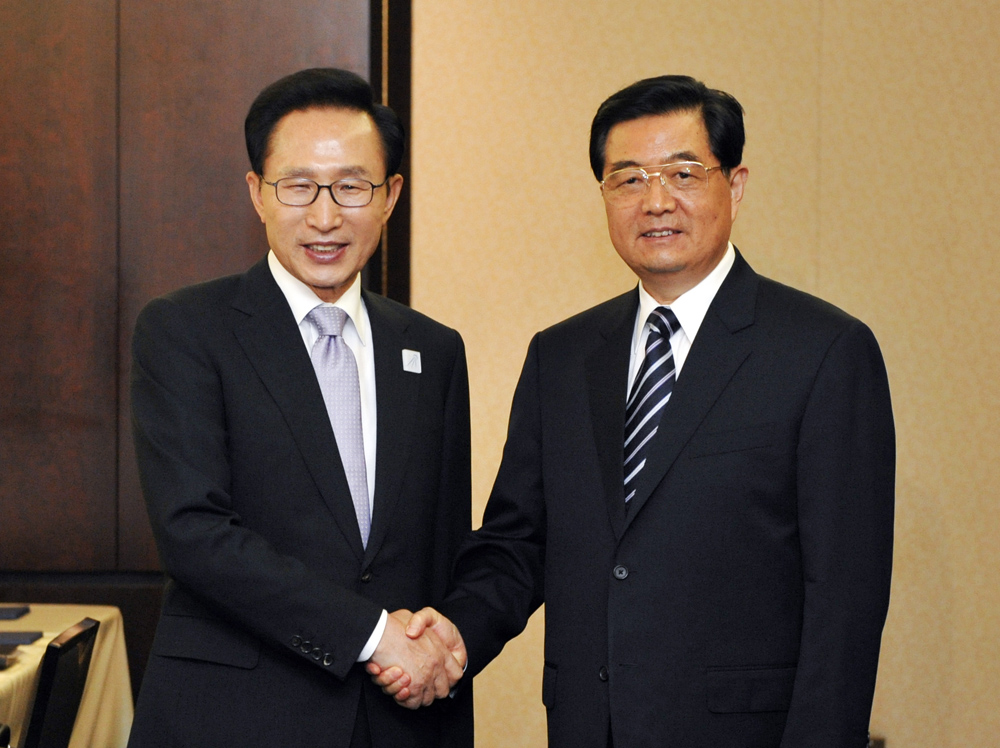
President Lee Myung-bak holds talks with Chinese President Hu Jintao on the sidelines of the G-20 summit in June 2010.

As a result of his efforts, the decision to hold the G-20 Summit in Seoul in November 2010 was passed unanimously at the 2009 Pittsburgh summit. In a historic first, South Korea became the first non-G8 country to take the chairmanship of the forum, and in Toronto, President Lee rallied support for his proposal on creating global financial safety nets and addressing development issues. At the G-20 Summit in Seoul, this led directly to the unanimous endorsement of the Seoul Development Consensus.

Under his administration, South Korea was admitted to the Development Assistance Committee (DAC). Representatives of the DAC member nations met at the Organisation for Economic Co-operation and Development (OECD) Secretariat in Paris, France, in November 2009, and voted unanimously to admit South Korea as the 24th member. The DAC members provide more than 90 percent of the world's aid for impoverished developing nations, and South Korea is the only member nation that has gone from being an aid beneficiary to a donor.

President Lee's diplomatic efforts led to an agreement between Korea Electric Power Corporation (KEPCO) and the UAE on the construction of a US$20 billion Korean standard nuclear power plant during his visit to the UAE at the end of 2009.

President Lee also held bilateral summits with the leaders of the United States, Japan, and People's Republic of China to discuss North Korean affairs. In the wake of the ROKS Cheonan sinking, a joint declaration was issued by the G-8 leaders condemning the North. President Lee succeeded in bringing the Cheonan incident to the forefront in the Chair's Statement for the Asia-Europe Meeting in 2010 at Brussels, drawing member nation support for the South Korean government's stance on North Korea's nuclear issue and stability in Northeast Asia. In addition, President Lee urged Japanese Prime Minister Kan Naoto to put his words on 15 August, Korea's Liberation Day into action. Regular reunions of the families separated by the Korean War drew attention as an international issue after being included in the Chair's Statement.

Under the Lee administration, South Korea successfully concluded a free trade agreement with the European Union on 1 July 2011.

Lee was involved in a surveillance scandal that encouraged both Saenuri Party and the Democratic United Party to put pressure against him.

== Controversies and issues ==
=== BBK incident ===
Lee Myung-bak was alleged to have been involved in an illegal company named BBK, which brought controversy to South Korea during the election season. BBK co-founders were investigated for large-scale embezzlement and stock price-fixing schemes. They had initially stated that Lee was not involved with the company, and Lee himself denied being associated with BBK. They attempted to implicate Lee in criminal involvement, which was not supported by evidence. He never admitted any wrongdoings, but the Korean press, controlled by Lee, made false report that he did. Lee was declared innocent of all charges by the Supreme Court of Korea. However, that was because the Korean prosecutors manipulated the case. In 2018, Lee was arrested and his involvement in BBK and DAS was confirmed by the same prosecutor's office. According to leaked diplomatic cables, Yoo Chong-ha (유종하), the former co-chairman of Lee's presidential election campaign, requested then American ambassador to South Korea, Alexander Vershbow, to delay the extraction of the main individual of the BBK embezzlement scandal to Korea to prevent spreading controversies related to Lee's involvement in the BBK embezzlement scandal during the election season.

=== Naegok-dong post-presidency residence issues ===
Lee's acquisition of a house in Seocho-gu's Naegok-dong under his son's name caused a problem. One of the candidate lands that he sought was a green belt area, which could cause contradiction about his "eco-friendly" governance. This spurred many controversies. For instance, a female lobbyist-like civilian with the family name of Yoo was involved in this Naegok-dong deal with Lee's family members. She moved to the U.S. to avoid possible arrest.

Lee purchased the land under his son's name, which could potentially violate South Korean real estate laws. The prosecutors formally proposed to investigate President Lee's son, who was also involved in the contract.

Legal professor Lee Sang-don, voiced his opinion that President Lee's Naegok-dong property crisis could justify his impeachment.

=== Tax evasion ===
The spokesperson of the Democratic Party, Lee Yong-seop (이용섭), said that the presidential family's current residence was evading tax by declaring parts of the building for commercial purposes.

=== Relatives' corruption charges ===
There were criticism of Lee's nepotism for his older brother, Lee Sang-deuk, whose personal aide was charged for taking $0.5 ~ $0.6 million from SLS Group. Lee Sang-deuk himself also served 14 months prison time for taking bribes from Solomon Supreme Prosecutors for extorting funds for the Four Major Rivers Project.

=== Detention ===
Lee was detained on 22 March 2018 on charges of receiving 11 billion Korean won (~US$10 million) worth of bribes and slush funds worth 35 billion Korean won (~US$33 million).

He is accused of taking bribes from Samsung of nearly $6 million in exchange for a presidential pardon for Samsung chairman Lee Kun-hee who was in prison for tax evasion and stock fraud. It is alleged that this money was used to pay legal fees for DAS, a car-parts manufacturing firm owned by Lee's brother.

Lee is also accused of embezzling $700k of government money that was initially set aside for Seoul's intelligence agency.

In early April he was indicted on graft charges.

=== Conviction and sentence ===
On 5 October 2018, Lee Myung-bak was convicted of bribery, embezzlement and abuse of power and sentenced to 15 years' imprisonment. He was also ordered to pay a 13 billion won ($11.5m; £8.8m) fine.

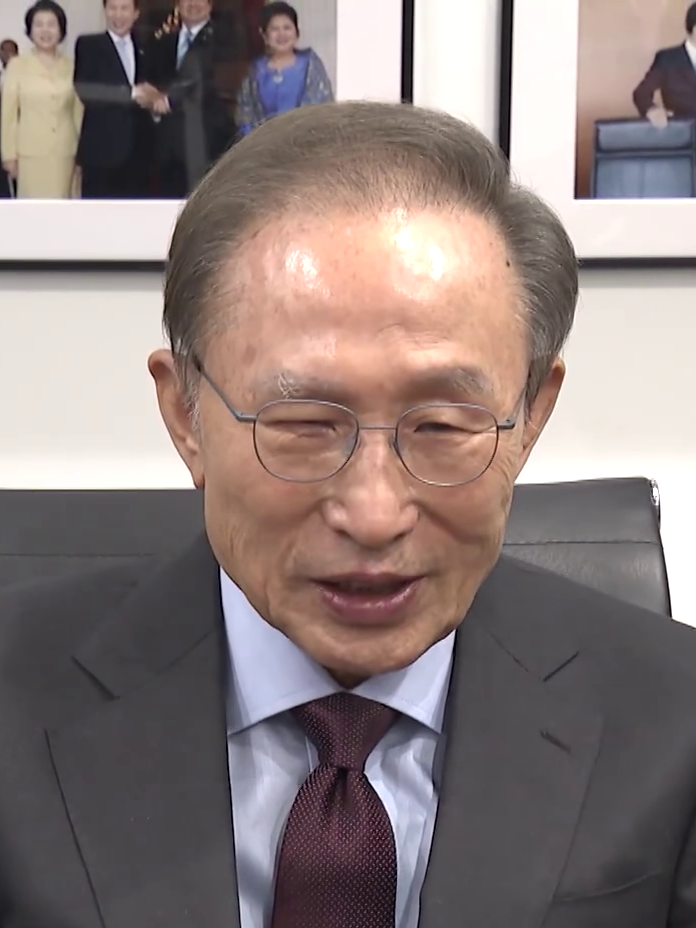
Lee in 2025

On 29 October 2020, the Supreme Court upheld a 17-year sentence for Lee Myung-bak for bribery and embezzlement, the 13 billion won ($11.4 million) fine and the additional forfeiture of 5.78 billion won ($5 million). On 27 December 2022, incumbent President Yoon Suk-yeol granted Lee a special pardon.

=== Lee v Lee ===
In Seochodong, Seoul, in mid 1990s, was a restaurant named Huiraedeung(희래등). It had been successful by 2000 so that the restaurateur, Lee, decided to expand by adding a second story to the 1-story building. Instead of such agreements between the tenant and the landlord as direct cost sharing or rent abatement, the latter verbally promised longer lease commitment for a decade or so in return for the upgrade. The tenant proceeded with the construction taking all the associated expense, ₩600 million. In 2002, however, he got a notice about the lease ending instead of renewal from Kim Jaejeong(김재정), Lee's brother in law and alleged property manager. Lee could no longer resist than Kim had got a court order to evacuate. Then, Kim proposed settlement at ₩133 million, which the leaving tenant accepted. Everything left as had been, except for the changed head, including such as kitchen utensils and staff, the 2-storied culinary business continued the Chinese cuisine with a new promotional name, Ganghuizae(강희재). Now a fugitive debtor, the former operator fled to Indonesia, had to see his mentally collapsed and less than 50 year old wife passing away, and then in 2013 sued Lee seeking remedy for the ₩600 million investment but couldn't win.

== In popular culture ==
- Lee Myung-bak rat poster incident
- Portrayed by Yu In-chon in the 1990–1991 KBS 2TV TV series The Years Of Ambition inspired the character under the name Park Hyung-seop.
- Portrayed by Yoo Dong-geun in the 2004–2005 MBC TV series The Age of Heroes inspired the character under the name Park Dae-chul.
- The United Colors of Benetton presented a Photoshopped image of Lee and North Korean leader Kim Jong Il kissing for the 2011 campaign, unhate.
- A US-based South Korean artist released a comical portrait of Lee Myung-bak in a Nazi uniform, similar to Charlie Chaplin's The Great Dictator, to the public; he was later arrested.
- Seo Gi-ho (서기호), a judge who received warnings from his superiors because he had published strong anti-Lee remarks despite being a civil servant, expressed positive support through Twitter to a Gyeonggi Province Guri-based middle school teacher. The teacher received strong criticism and awaited discipline from his school after students and parents complained that he used exam questions to convey his anti-Lee agenda to his students.
- Naneun Ggomsuda

== Awards and honors ==
=== National honours ===
- South Korea (2013)
  - Recipient of the Grand Order of Mugunghwa

=== Foreign honours ===
- Peru (2008)
  - Grand Cross of Order of the Sun of Peru
- Kazakhstan (2009)
  - Recipient of the Order of the Golden Eagle
- Italy (2009)
  - Knight Grand Cross of the Order of Merit of the Italian Republic
- United Arab Emirates (2011)
  - Collar of the Order of Zayed
- Denmark (2011)
  - Knight of the Order of the Elephant
- Sweden (2012)
  - Knight of the Royal Order of the Seraphim
- Indonesia (2012)
  - Star of the Republic of Indonesia, 1st class

== Electoral history ==
14th National Assembly General Election: National (25th)
Party	Candidate	Votes	%
Democratic Liberal	Lee Myung-bak	7,923,718	38.49
Democratic Liberal hold			

15th National Assembly General Election : Jongno District (Seoul)
Party	Candidate	Votes	%
New Korea	Lee Myung-bak	40,230	41.00
National Congress	Lee Jong-chan	32,918	33.55
Democratic	Roh Moo-hyun	17,330	17.67
United Liberal Democrats	Kim Eul-dong	6,602	6.72
Total votes		99,365	100.0
New Korea hold			

2002 Seoul Metropolitan Mayoral election
Party	Candidate	Votes	%
Grand National	Lee Myung-bak	1,819,057	52.28
Millennium Democratic	Kim Min-seok	1,496,754	43.02
Democratic Labor	Lee Mun-ok	87,965	2.52
Total votes		3,510,898	100.0
Grand National gain from Millennium Democratic			

2007 South Korean presidential election
Party	Candidate	Votes	%
Grand National	Lee Myung-bak	11,492,389	48.67
New Democratic	Chung Dong-young	6,174,681	26.14
Independent	Lee Hoi-chang	3,559,963	15.07
Creative Korea	Moon Kook-hyun	1,375,498	5.83
Democratic Labor	Kwon Young-ghil	712,121	3.01
Total votes		23,732,854	100.0

== See also ==
- Lee Myung-bak rat poster incident

== Notes ==
National Assembly of the Republic of Korea
Preceded by	Member of the National Assembly from National (25th, Democratic Liberal Party); 30 May 1992–29 May 1996	Succeeded by
Preceded by Lee Jong-chan	Member of the National Assembly from Jongno District (Seoul); 30 May 1996–21 February 1998	Succeeded by Roh Moo-hyun
Political offices
Preceded by Goh Kun	Mayor of Seoul; 1 July 2002–30 June 2006	Succeeded by Oh Se-hoon
Preceded by Roh Moo-hyun	President of South Korea; 25 February 2008–24 February 2013	Succeeded by Park Geun-hye
Party political offices
Preceded by Lee Hoi-chang	Grand National Party nominee for President of South Korea; 2007	Succeeded by Park Geun-hye
Diplomatic posts
Preceded by Stephen Harper	Chairperson of the Group of 20; 2010	Succeeded by Nicolas Sarkozy
