= Lee Myung-bak rat poster incident =

Political controversy

In the Lee Myung-bak rat poster incident in Seoul, South Korea, university instructor Park Jeong-su (박정수) was indicted by the South Korean authorities for drawing a face of a rat on a promotional poster for the 2010 G-20 Seoul summit. The conservative Lee Myung-bak government was criticized for encouraging institutionalized censorship and abuse of authority, while the Supreme Prosecutors' Office of the Republic of Korea (SPO) was accused of being overly-supportive of the government.

== Background ==
University instructor Park Jeong-su vandalized a G-20 promotional poster by drawing a rat before the 2010 G-20 Seoul summit. There was concerns that he was released under the court orders despite the SPO over-pressuring his investigation to cater the ruling party. "Rat" was the popular nickname of then-President Lee Myung-bak. The letter "G" in "G20" is a homophone to "rat" in Korean. The Non-governmental organization citizen group called the People's Solidarity for Participatory Democracy planned to present his incident to the 16th meeting of the United Nations Commission on Human Rights. He later argued in his own defense that his rat drawing of the South Korean president has artistic merits. He was later fined. This has caused disputes of whether freedom of speech is legally upheld in South Korea.

=== Reactions ===
Lee Chang-dong had petitioned against the prosecution of Park Jeong-su.

Some netizens proposed to pay his fine by selling T-shirts of his rat drawing.

=== Remarks ===
Park later remarked, "After I experienced this incident, despite the freedom of the press and the freedom of speech are mandated by law, I feel that the political authority dictates both of them in reality".

== Similar incident ==
A US-based South Korean artist was arrested for showing a comical portrait of Lee Myung-bak in a Nazi uniform similar to Charlie Chaplin's The Great Dictator.

== See also ==
- Criticism of Lee Myung-bak
- Human rights in South Korea
- Lee Myung-bak government
