= Grand Korean Waterway =

Canal between Seoul and Busan, within South Korea

- Hangul: 한반도 대운하
- Hanja: 韓半島大運河
- RR: Hanbando daeunha
- MR: Hanbando taeunha

The Grand Korean Waterway, officially known as the Pan Korea Grand Waterway, was a proposed 540-kilometer-long (340 mi) canal connecting Seoul and Busan, South Korea's two largest cities. The canal would run diagonally across the country connecting the Han River, which flows through Seoul into the Yellow Sea, to the Nakdong River, which flows through Busan into the Korea Strait. The proposed canal would traverse difficult mountainous terrain.

The Pan Korea Grand Waterway was a project of Lee Myung-bak, the 10th president of South Korea. It met with huge controversy and disapproval and was later abandoned. Lee stated that the canal would bring clear water source by cleaning layers of sediments that formed in the rivers, create tourist infrastructure and prevent disturbance of logistics.

Many Koreans were anxious about Lee's plans. They argued that the canal would prove disastrous to the natural environment and potentially hazardous to the freshwater sources that nearly 50 million residents of the country depend on. In addition, many researchers and interested distribution industries prospected the canal would be economically unprofitable because land transportation may be more cost-effective.

Supporters of the plan insisted that the length of the construction would only be 40 km, linking the Han River with the Nakdong River. The canal would require sufficient width, depth and height of bridge decks to allow barges passage. Major portions of the Han and Nakdong are far narrower and shallower than is required, with most of the bridges on these rivers being unsuitable as their clearance is too low. The scale of construction would be enormous; a number of bridges would need to be rebuilt and both rivers would require extensive dredging along the 540-kilometer route.

Lee proposed to fund the project almost exclusively through private funds and subsidize it through the sale of sand and gravel dredged from the rivers and streams involved in the project. This dredging would, he argued, also make the rivers cleaner.

The proposal included a smaller canal, planned to link Seoul and neighboring Incheon. It was suggested that this would assist economic partnerships between the two cities, lessen traffic congestion, and stimulate tourism, beyond providing Seoul access to the Yellow Sea (West Sea). The mouth of the Han River is in an area between North Korea and South Korea, which limits economic activity in the region for security reasons.

== See also ==
- Geography of South Korea
- Rivers of Korea
- Ara Canal
- Four Major Rivers Project
