= Foreign relations of South Korea =

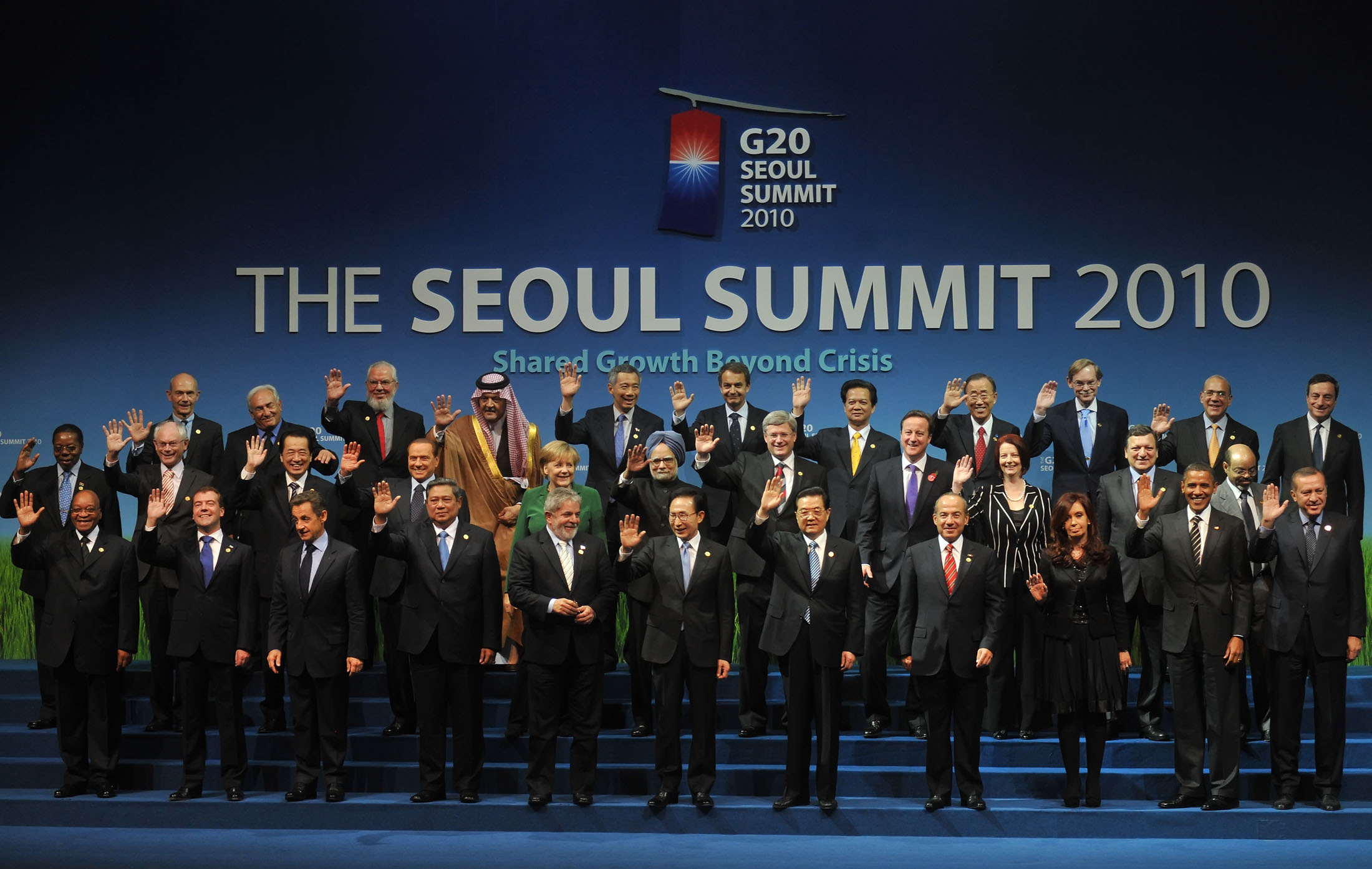
Participants of the 2010 G20 Seoul summit gather for a conventional "family photo".

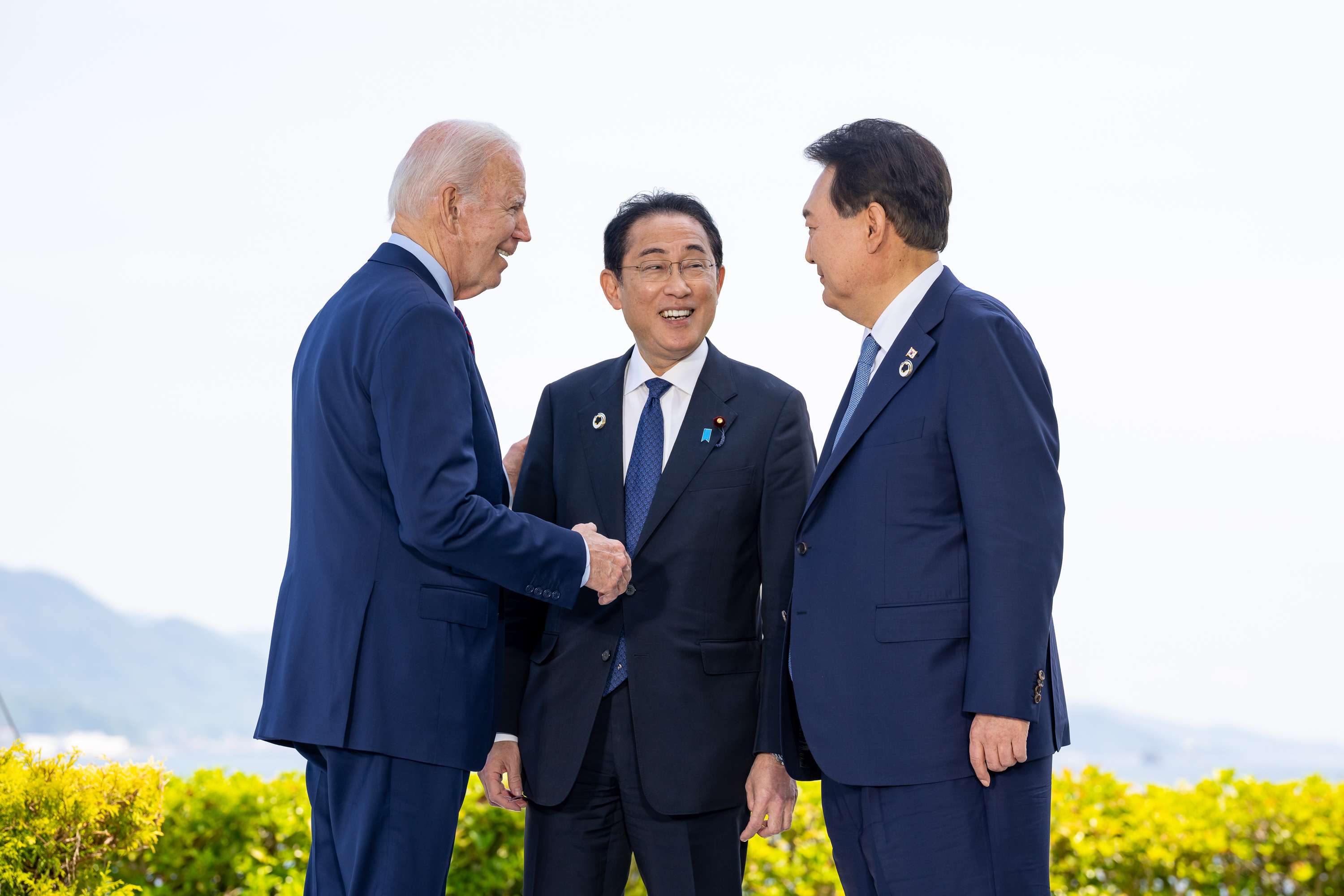
United States, Japan, and South Korean leaders meet at G7 meeting

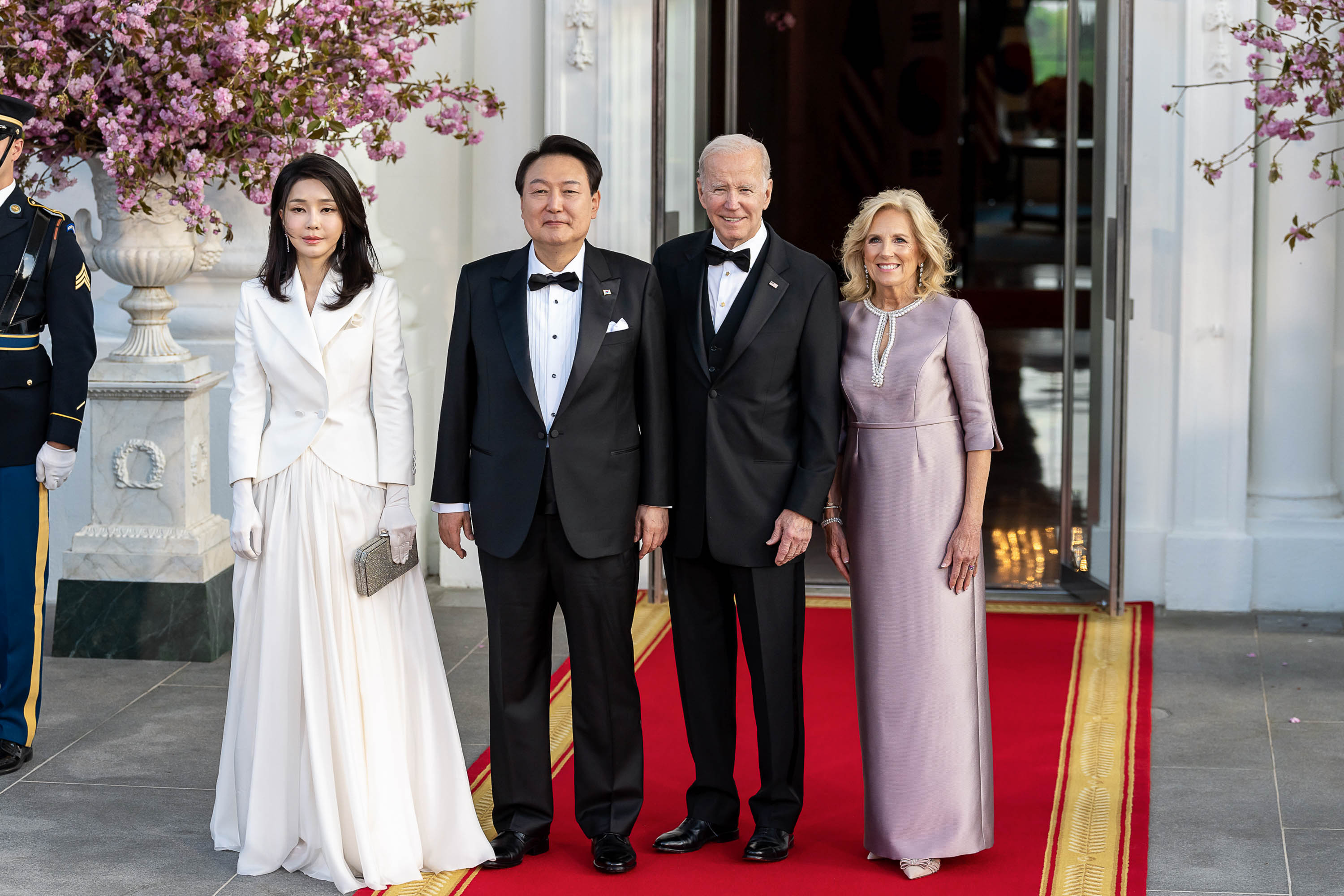
Yoon Suk Yeol's 2023 state visit to the United States

South Korea maintains diplomatic relations with every United Nations member state except for North Korea. The country is a member of the United Nations, WTO, OECD/DAC, ASEAN Plus Three, East Asia Summit (EAS), and G-20. It is also a founding member of Asia-Pacific Economic Cooperation (APEC) and the East Asia Summit.

South Korea has been a member of the United Nations since 1991, when it became a member state at the same time as North Korea. The country has also hosted major international events such as the 1988 Summer Olympics and 2002 World Cup Football Tournament (2002 FIFA World Cup co-hosted with Japan) and the 2011 IAAF World Championships Daegu South Korea. Furthermore, South Korea had hosted the 2018 Winter Olympics which took place in Pyeongchang from 9 to 25 February.

The diplomacy of South Korea is handled by the Ministry of Foreign Affairs (MOFA). On 1 January 2007, South Korean Foreign Minister Ban Ki-moon assumed the post of UN Secretary-General, serving in that post until 31 December 2016. The country held the 2023 South Korea-Pacific Islands Summit, the 2024 South Korea-Africa Summit and the 2026 South Korea-Central Asia Summit to deepen cooperation with developing countries.

In June 2024, South Korea introduced the "K-Silk Road Initiative," a comprehensive strategy to deepen cooperation with Central Asian nations in trade, investment, infrastructure, energy, and digital connectivity. The inaugural Korea-Central Asia Summit is scheduled to be held in Seoul on September 16–17, 2026, bringing together the leaders of South Korea and the five Central Asian states.

== International organization participation ==
- For economy and finance: Club de Paris, IFC, IBRD, IDA, OECD, MIGA, ICSID, ADB, AIIB, AfDB, AfDF, EBRD, IADB, MIF, CFC, CABEI, BIS, South East Asian Central Banks, Executives' Meeting of East Asia and Pacific Central Banks, FSB, World Bank (MIGA), EBRD, ITC, WTO, IMO, IMF, WBG, IPEF, APEC
- For energy and chemical: IEA, IAEA, OPCW, CTBTO
- For security: NATO (Global Partner), MIKTA, OSCE
- For food: IGA, WFP, UNICEF, FAO, IFAD,
- For culture: BIE, UNESCO, UNWTO, IOM, AIPH (Partner), IOC, OCA, IPC
- For justice: ICAO, ICPO
- For support of developing countries: UNDP, DAC
- Other: UN, G-20, IPU, UNEP, ILO, ITU, UNIDO, UPU, WHO, WIPO, WMO, GGGI

== Foreign policy ==
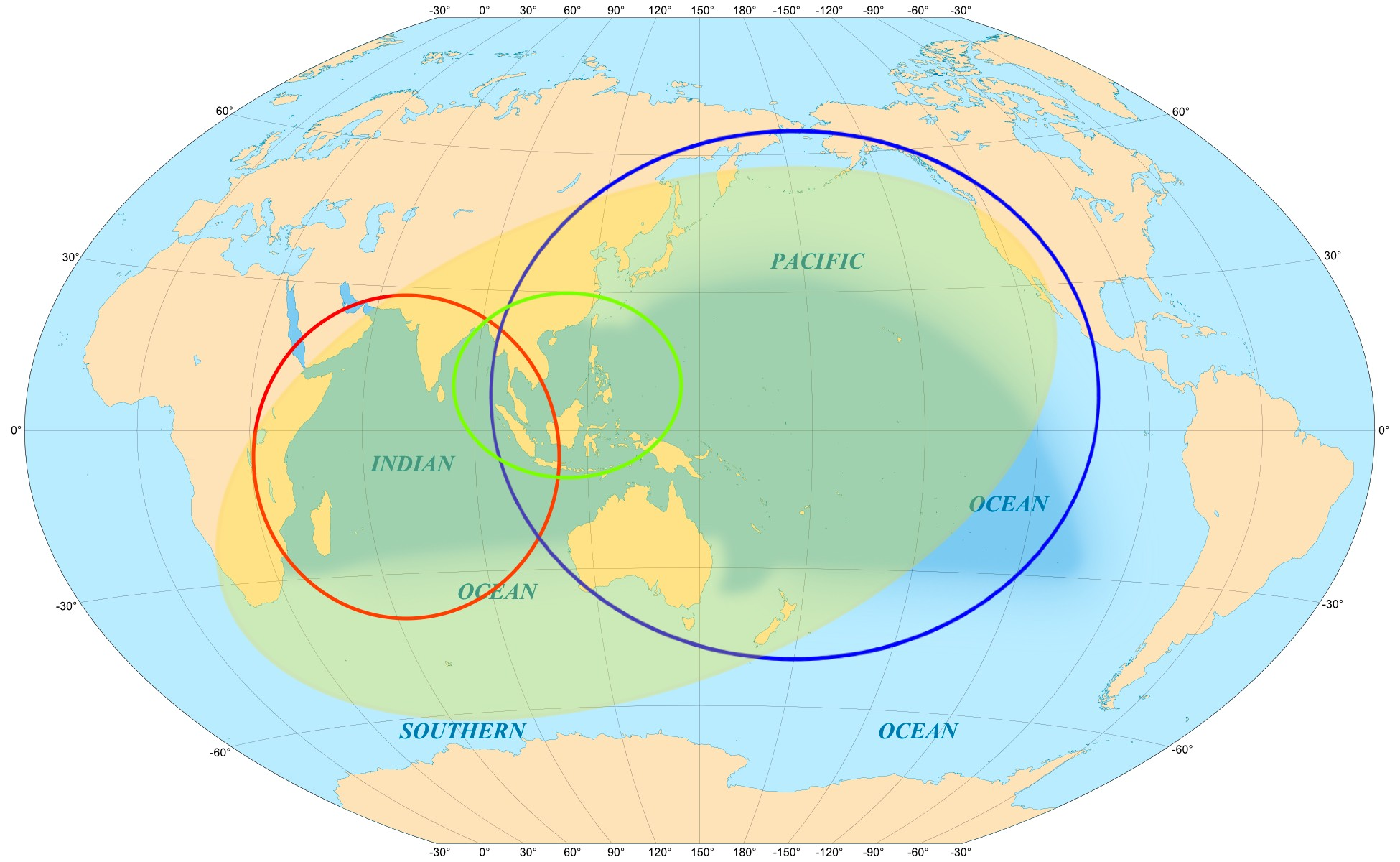
Indo-Pacific

South Korea's Indo-Pacific strategy is a comprehensive strategy that encompasses the economic and security spheres of Indo-Pacific countries. Announcing the strategy, the country said, "While strengthening the rules-based International order, which is conducive to a stable and prosperous Indo-Pacific, we will work towards a regional order that enables a diverse set of nations to cooperate and prosper together."

== Free trade agreements ==
South Korea Free-trade areas

South Korea has the following trade agreements:

- South Korea-ASEAN (Brunei, Cambodia, Indonesia, Laos, Malaysia, Myanmar, Philippines, Singapore, Thailand, Vietnam) FTA
- South Korea-Australia FTA
- South Korea-Canada CKFTA FTA
- South Korea Central America (Costa Rica, El Salvador, Honduras, Nicaragua, Panama) FTA
- South Korea-Chile FTA
- South Korea-China FTA
- South Korea-Colombia FTA
- South Korea-EFTA (Iceland, Lichtenstein, Norway, Switzerland) FTA
- South Korea-EU (Austria, Belgium, Bulgaria, Croatia, Cyprus, Czech Republic, Denmark, Estonia, Finland, France, Germany, Greece, Hungary, Ireland, Italy, Latvia, Lithuania, Luxembourg, Malta, Netherlands, Poland, Portugal, Romania, Slovakia, Slovenia, Spain, Sweden, UK) FTA
- South Korea-India CEPA FTA
- South Korea-Indonesia
- South Korea-Israel
- South Korea-New Zealand FTA
- South Korea-Peru FTA
- South Korea-RCEP (Australia, Brunei, Cambodia, China, Indonesia, Japan, South Korea, Laos, Malaysia, Myanmar, New Zealand, the Philippines, Singapore, Thailand, and Vietnam)
- South Korea-Singapore FTA
- South Korea-Turkey FTA
- South Korea-United Kingdom (KUKFTA)
- South Korea-United States of America (KORUS FTA)
- South Korea-Vietnam FTA

As of late 2021 states of GCC (Gulf Cooperation Council—Bahrain, Kuwait, Oman, Qatar, Saudi Arabia, United Arab Emirates), Israel, Japan, Malaysia, MERCOSUR (Southern Common Market—Mercado comun del sur), Mexico, Mongolia, RCEP (Asian 10 Countries, Korea, China, Japan, Australia, New Zealand, India), Russia (BEPA), SACU (South Asia Cooperation Union) and South Korea-China-Japan are in negotiations about the FTA with South Korea. On 22 November 2023, South Korea and the United Kingdom opened up negotiations for a new Free Trade Agreement, to replace the current continuity trade agreement.

== Asia ==
=== China (PRC) ===
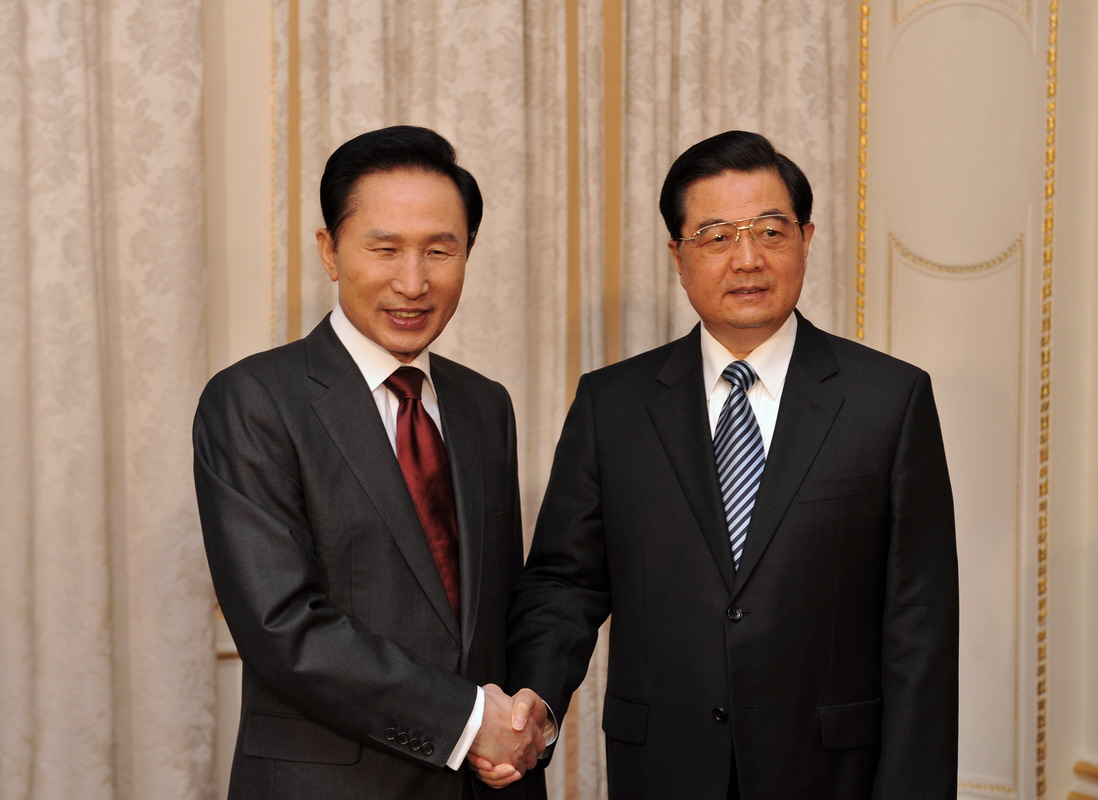
South Korean President Lee Myung-bak and Chinese President Hu Jintao in London, April 2009

Active South Korean-Chinese people-to-people contacts have been encouraged. Academics, journalists and particularly families divided between South Korea and the People's Republic of China (PRC) were able to exchange visits freely in the late 1980s. Nearly 2 million ethnic Koreans, especially in the Yanbian Korean Autonomous Prefecture in Jilin Province of Northeast China, have interacted with South Koreans.

Trade between the two countries continued to increase nonetheless, Furthermore, China has attempted to mediate between North Korea and the United States, and between North Korea and Japan. China also initiated and promoted tripartite talks between North Korea, South Korea and the U.S.

South Korea had long been an ally of Taiwan. Diplomatic ties between Seoul and Taipei were nevertheless severed in 1992. Formal diplomatic relations were established between Seoul and Beijing on 24 August 1992.

In 2004 the PRC government began the Northeast Project, sparking a massive uproar in South Korea when the project was widely publicized.

After the KORUS FTA (United States-South Korea Free Trade Agreement) was finalized on 30 June 2007, the Chinese government has immediately begun seeking an FTA agreement with South Korea. The FTA between South Korea and China are under discussion. South Korea has been running a trade surplus with China which hit a record US$32.5 billion in 2009.

=== Taiwan (ROC) ===
On 23 August 1992, the government of the Republic of China (by then only in control of the island of Taiwan and a few outlying areas) severed diplomatic relations with South Korea in advance of its announcement of formal recognition of the People's Republic of China based in Beijing. The Yonhap News said in 2002 that since then relations between the two governments have been "in a rut".

=== Japan ===
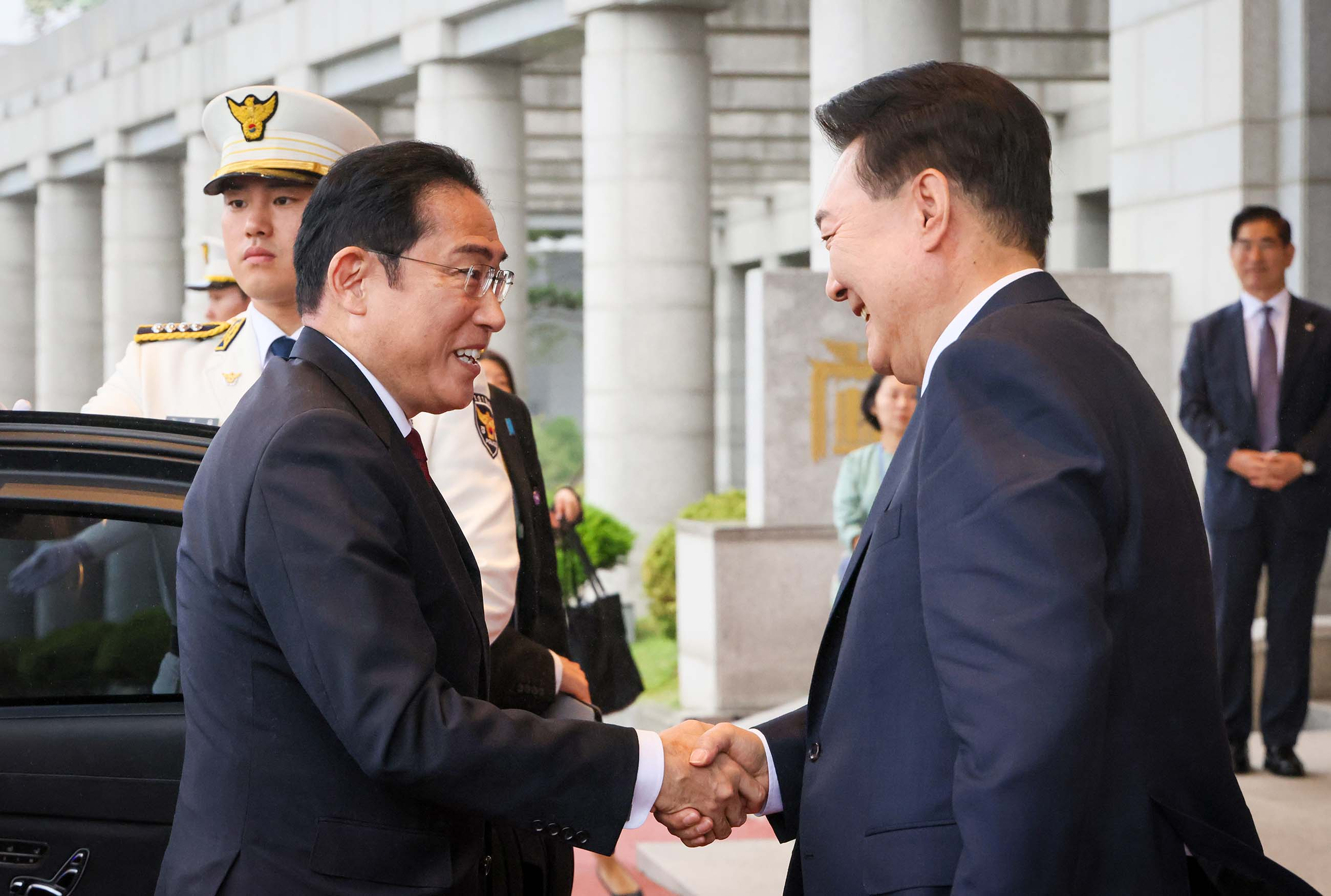
Japanese Prime Minister Fumio Kishida and President Yoon Suk Yeol in seoul, 2024

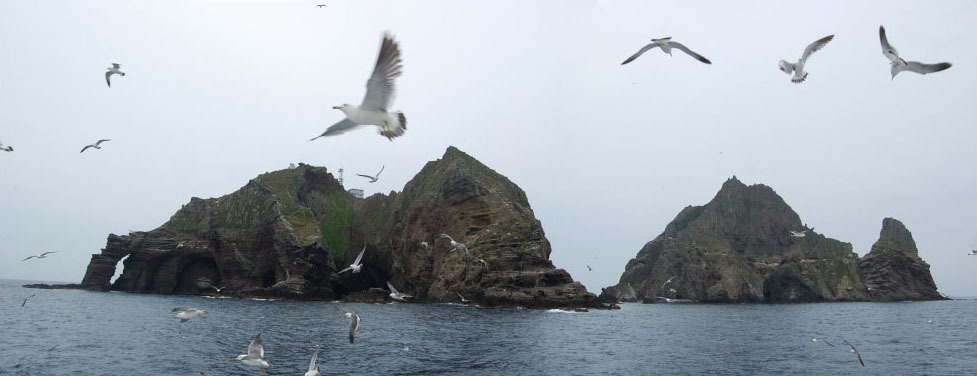
There is an ongoing dispute between Japan and South Korea over the sovereignty of the Liancourt Rocks

The relation between South Korea and Japan has both political conflicts and economic intimacies. Examples of conflicts include the East sea naming dispute, visits by successive Japanese Prime Ministers to the Yasukuni Shrine and the disputed ownership of Dokdo of the island Korea.

On 18 January 1952, The first president of South Korea Syngman Rhee declared that the vicinity of Dokdo was a territory of South Korea (Syngman Rhee line). Subsequently, some 3,000 Japanese fishermen who conducted fishery operations in this vicinity were captured. This incident, called the Dai Ichi Daihoumaru Ship case strained relations between South Korea and Japan.

22 June 1965, The president in South Korea Park Chung Hee concluded the Treaty on Basic Relations between Japan and South Korea As a result, Japan considered South Korea to be the legitimate successor of its rule over the Korean Peninsula.

South Korea's trade with Japan was US$892.1 million in 2008, with a surplus of nearly US$327.1 million on the Japanese side. Japanese and South Koreans firms often had interdependent relations, which gave Japan advantages in South Korea's growing market.

In 1996 FIFA announced that the South Korea-Japan would jointly host the 2002 FIFA World Cup. The next few years would see leaders of both countries meet to warm relations in preparations for the games. The year 2005 was designated as the "Japan-South Korea Friendship Year". However, the Liancourt Rocks controversy erupted again when Japan's Shimane Prefecture declared "Takeshima Day", inciting mass demonstrations in South Korea.

Japan calls South Korea a partner in its diplomatic charter, and South Korean President Yoon Suk Yeol also said, "Korea and Japan are now partners who share universal values and pursue common interests."

=== Mongolia ===
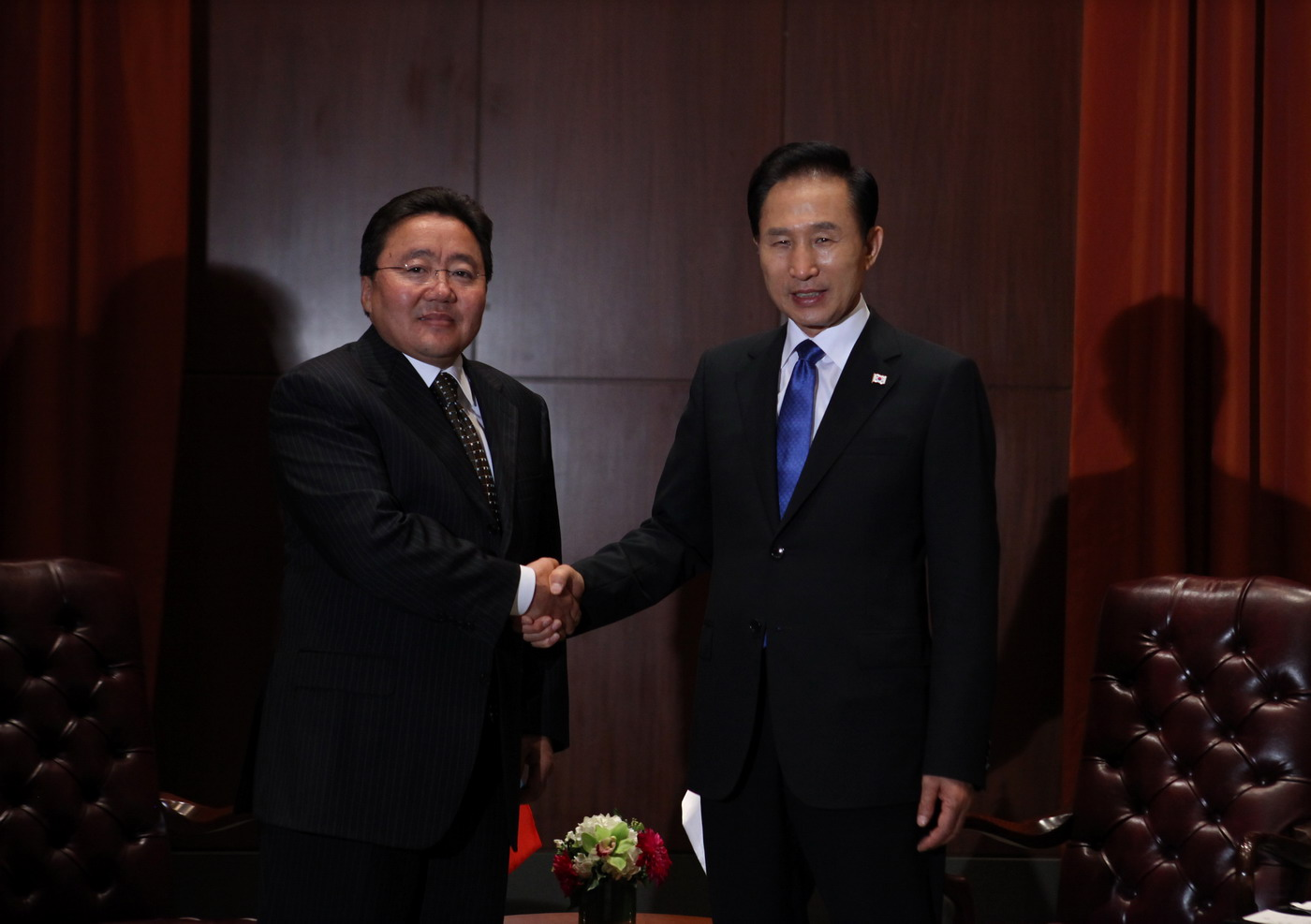
Lee Myung-bak and Tsakhiagiin Elbegdorj, September 2009

Both countries established diplomatic relations on 26 March 1990. South Korea has an embassy in Ulaanbaatar, Mongolia. Mongolia has an embassy in Seoul.

=== Philippines ===
Since the establishment of diplomatic ties on 3 March 1949, the relationship between the Philippines and South Korea has flourished. The Philippines was one of the first countries that extended diplomatic recognition to South Korea. This was cemented with the Philippine government's deployment of the Philippine Expeditionary Force to Korea (PEFTOK) to help South Korea against the invasion of the communist North during the Korean War in the 1950s. After the war, the Philippines provided development assistance to South Korea and helped the country rebuild itself.

Since then, the Philippines's relations with South Korea have evolved with South Korea becoming one of the Philippines's most important bilateral partners aside from the United States, China and Japan. The Philippines's government seeks to cultivate strategic ties with South Korea given its increasing presence in the country. In the coming years, the Philippines anticipates to benefit from exploring unprecedented opportunities from South Korea that shall contribute significantly to the country's trade and economy, defense and security, and society and culture.

=== Vietnam ===
The relationship between these two Sinosphere countries is usually described as "from enemies to friends". Despite the two states' hostile positions in the Vietnam War and South Korean war crimes and atrocities in the Vietnam War, which still causes lingering controversies between the two states, both countries have still become each other's most important trade partner throughout their relationship. South Korea is the third biggest trade partner of Vietnam while also being the second-biggest ODA provider and the biggest foreign direct investor to Vietnam; meanwhile, Vietnam is the third-biggest trade partner of South Korea and it is also hosting many important factories and facilities of South Korea's biggest conglomerate such as Samsung and LG.

In December 2022, the two nations have elevated their ties to comprehensive strategic partnership – technically the highest level of bilateral relationship that is designated by the Vietnamese side. Both countries have aimed to raise their two-way trade to 100 billion U.S. dollars in 2023 and expected to reach 150 billion by the end of this decade. Besides major economic ties and cooperations, South Korea and Vietnam also plan to further cooperate in politics, cultural exchange, resources exploitation, national security as well as in the defense sectors. Both countries share core benefits, concerns, and support to each other in issues related to the security of the region, noticeably Vietnamese support towards South Korea's effort in denuclearization of the Korean Peninsula (mentioning North Korea) and South Korea's support on Vietnam's attitude towards the stability and freedom of navigation of the South China Sea. Vietnam is also an important partner of South Korea to exercise its Indo-Pacific strategy and the insight to strengthen South Korea's relationship with the Association of Southeast Asian Nations. It is said that Vietnam can be a "bridge" or "ambassador" representing South Korea's influence to the Southeast Asia region.

In the state visit of the President of Vietnam to South Korea in December 2022, South Korean President Yoon Suk-yeol has honored Vietnamese President Nguyễn Xuân Phúc as "my very first national guest" (referring the fact that his Vietnamese counterpart was the first head of state to visit South Korea during his terms), and also saying that the people of Vietnam and South Korea are "close brothers".

=== North Korea ===
Inter-Korean relations may be divided into five periods. The first stage was between 1972 and 1973; the second stage was Pyongyang North Korea's delivery of relief goods to South Korea after a typhoon caused devastating floods in 1984 and the third stage was the exchange of home visits and performing artists in 1985. The fourth stage, activated by Nordpolitik under Roh, was represented by expanding public and private contacts between the two Koreas. The fifth stage was improved following the 1997 election of Kim Dae-jung. His "Sunshine Policy" of engagement with North Korea set the stage for the historic June 2000 Inter-Korean summit.

The possibility of Korean reunification has remained a prominent topic. However, no peace treaty has yet been signed with the North. In June 2000, a historic first North Korea-South Korea summit took place, part of the South Korea's continuing Sunshine Policy of engagement. Since then, regular contacts have led to a cautious thaw. President Kim was awarded the Nobel Peace Prize in 2000 for the policy.

With that policy, continued by the following administration of president Roh Moo-hyun, economic ties between the two countries have increased, humanitarian aid has been sent to North Korea and some divided families have been briefly reunited. Military ties remain fraught with tension, however, and in 2002 a brief naval skirmish left four South Korean sailors dead, leaving the future of the Sunshine policy uncertain. The North Korea cut off talks but the South remained committed to the policy of reconciliation and relations began to thaw again. The resurgence of the nuclear issue two years later would again cast relations in doubt, but South Korea has sought to play the role of intermediary rather than antagonist, and economic ties at the time seemed to be growing again.

Despite the Sunshine Policy and efforts at reconciliation, the progress was complicated by North Korean missile tests in 1993, 1998, 2006 and 2009. As of early 2009, relationships between North Korea and South Korea were very tense; North Korea had been reported to have deployed missiles, Ended its former agreements with South Korea and threatened South Korea and the United States not to interfere with a satellite launch it had planned. As of 2009 North Korea and South Korea are still opposed and share a heavily fortified border.

On 27 May 2009, North Korea media declared that the armistice is no longer valid due to the South Korean government's pledge to "definitely join" the Proliferation Security Initiative. To further complicate and intensify strains between the two nations, the sinking of the South Korean warship Cheonan in March 2010, killing 46 seamen, is as of 20 May 2010 claimed by a team of researchers around the world to have been caused by a North Korean torpedo, which the North denies. South Korea agreed with the findings from the research group and president Lee Myung-bak declared in May 2010 that Seoul would cut all trade with North Korea as part of measures primarily aimed at striking back at North Korea diplomatically and financially. As a result of this, North Korea severed all ties and completely abrogated the previous pact of non aggression.

In November 2010, the Unification Ministry officially declared the Sunshine Policy a failure, thus bringing the policy to an end. On 23 November 2010, North Korean artillery shelled Yeonpyeong with dozens of rounds at Yeonpyeong-ri and the surrounding area.

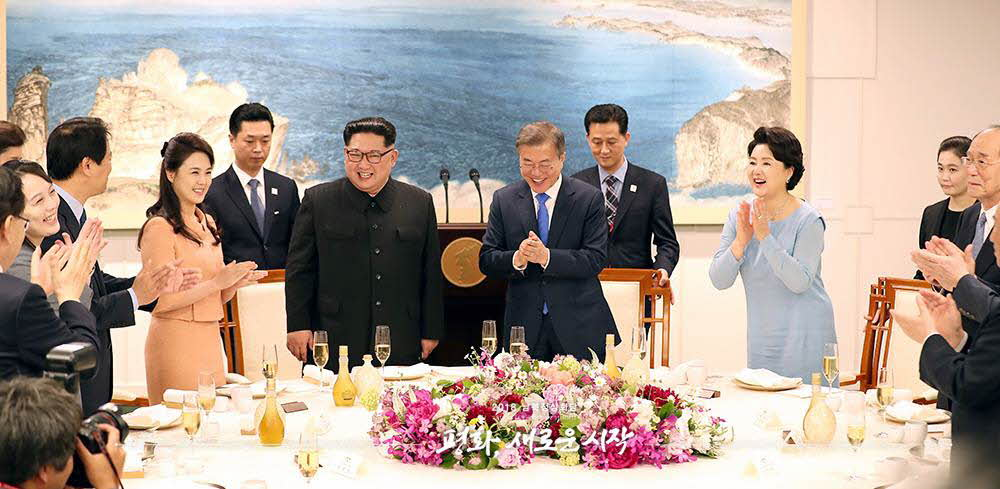
North Korean leader Kim Jong Un and South Korean President Moon Jae-in during the 2018 inter-Korean summit.

According to a 2013 BBC World Service Poll, 3% of South Koreans view North Korea's influence positively, with 91% expressing a negative view. A 2015 government-sponsored poll revealed that 41% of South Koreans consider North Korea to be an enemy, with negative views being more prevalent among younger respondents. Still, in a 2017 poll, 58% of South Koreans said they don't expect another war to break out with North Korea.

== Europe ==
=== Russia ===
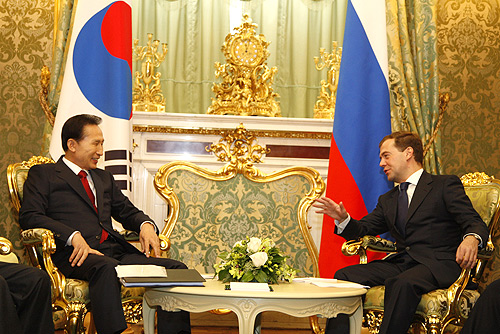
Dmitry Medvedev meeting Lee Myung-bak at The Kremlin.

In the 1980s South Korean president Roh Tae Woo's Nordpolitik and Mikhail Gorbachev's "New Thinking" were both attempts to reverse their nations' recent histories. Gorbachev had signaled Soviet interest in improving relations with all countries in the Asia-Pacific region including South Korea as explained in his July 1986 Vladivostok and August 1988 Krasnoyarsk speeches.

In initiating Nordpolitik Roh's confidential foreign policy adviser was rumored to have visited Moscow Russia to consult with Soviet policymakers. Kim Young Sam visited Moscow, Russian Federation from 2 June – 10 June 1989, as the Kremlin announced that it would allow some 300,000 Soviet-South Koreans who had been on the Soviet island of Sakhalin since the end of World War II to return permanently to South Korea. Moscow even arranged Kim's meeting with the North Korean ambassador to the Soviet Union In June 1990, Roh held his first summit with president Gorbachev in San Francisco, United States.

South Korea and the Soviet Union established diplomatic relations on 30 September 1990. These relations continued by the Russian Federation on 27 December 1991. Russian president Vladimir Putin visited Seoul in February 2001 while South Korean president Roh Moo-hyun visited Moscow, Russia in September 2004.

Russian Federal Space Agency and the Korean Astronaut Program cooperated together to send South Korea's first astronaut into space. Yi So-Yeon became the first South Korean national as well as the third woman to be the first national in space on 8 April 2008 when Soyuz TMA-12 departed from Baikonur Cosmodrome.

Since the 1990s there has been greater trade and cooperation between the Russian Federation and South Korea. The total trade volume between South Korea and Russia in 2003 was 4.2 billion U.S. dollars.

=== United Kingdom ===
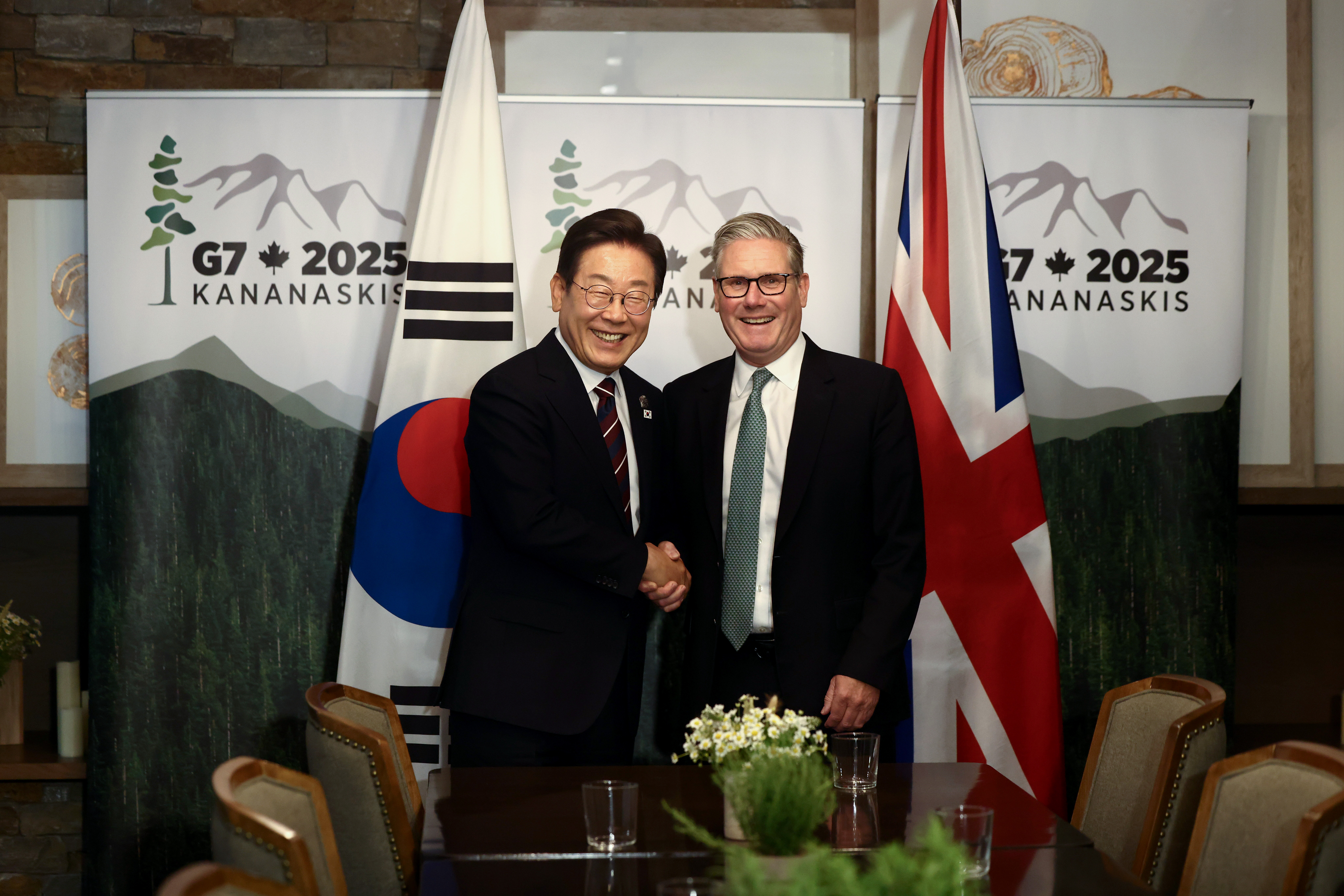
Prime Minister Keir Starmer with South Korean President Lee Jae-myung at a G7 summit in Kananaskis, June 2025.

The establishment of diplomatic relations between the United Kingdom and South Korea began on 18 January 1949.

Visits from South Korea to the United Kingdom:

- 1986 April: president Chun Doo-hwan
- 1989 November: president Roh Tae-woo
- 1995 March: president Kim Young-sam
- 1998 April: president Kim Dae-jung
- 2001 December: president Kim Dae-jung
- 2004 December: president Roh Moo-hyun
- 2006 February: Minister of Foreign Affairs and Trade Ban Ki-moon
- 2006 June: Minister of Foreign Affairs Ban Ki-moon
- 2009 April: president Lee Myung-bak (G20)
- 2013 April: Special envoy of the president, former prime minister Han Seung-soo (to attend the funeral of former British prime minister Margaret Thatcher)
- 2013 November: president Park Geun-hye
- 2014 December: Minister of Foreign Affairs Yun Byung-se.
- 2021 June: President Moon Jae-in
- 2021 November: President Moon Jae-in
- 2023 November: President Yoon Suk Yeol

From the United Kingdom to South Korea:

- 1986 May: Prime Minister Margaret Thatcher
- 1992 November: Charles, Prince of Wales and Diana, Princess of Wales
- 1996 March: Prime Minister John Major
- 1997 April: Prince Richard, Duke of Gloucester
- 1997 October: Prince Edward, Duke of Kent
- 1999 April: Queen Elizabeth II
- 2000 October: Prime Minister Tony Blair
- 2003 July: Prime Minister Tony Blair
- 2001 April: Prince Andrew, Duke of York
- 2005 November: Prince Andrew, Duke of York
- 2006 October: Deputy Prime Minister John Prescott
- 2008 September: Prince Andrew, Duke of York
- 2008 December: G20 Special Envoy Timms
- 2009 October: Minister of Business, Innovation and Skills Peter Mandelson, Baron Mandelson
- 2010 November: Prime Minister David Cameron
- 2012 March: Deputy Prime Minister Nick Clegg to attend Seoul Nuclear Security Summit
- 2013 October: Secretary of State for Foreign and Commonwealth Affairs William Hague (to attend Seoul Conference on Cyberspace 2013).

=== European Union ===
The European Union (EU) and South Korea are important trading partners, having negotiated a free trade agreement for many years since South Korea was designated as a priority FTA partner in 2006. The free trade agreement has been approved in September 2010, following Italy's conditional withdrawal of its veto of the free trade agreement. The compromise made by Italy was that free trade agreement would take provisional effect on 1 July 2011. South Korea is the EU's eighth largest trade partner and the EU has become South Korea's second largest export destination. EU trade with South Korea exceeded €65 billion in 2008 and has enjoyed an annual average growth rate of 7.5% between 2004 and 2008.

The EU has been the single largest foreign investor in South Korea since 1962 and accounted for almost 45% of all FDI inflows into South Korea in 2006. Nevertheless, EU companies have significant problems accessing and operating in South Korea market due to stringent standards and testing requirements for products and services often creating barriers to trade. Both in its regular bilateral contacts with South Korea and through its FTA with South Korea, the EU is seeking to improve this situation.

== Americas ==
=== United States ===
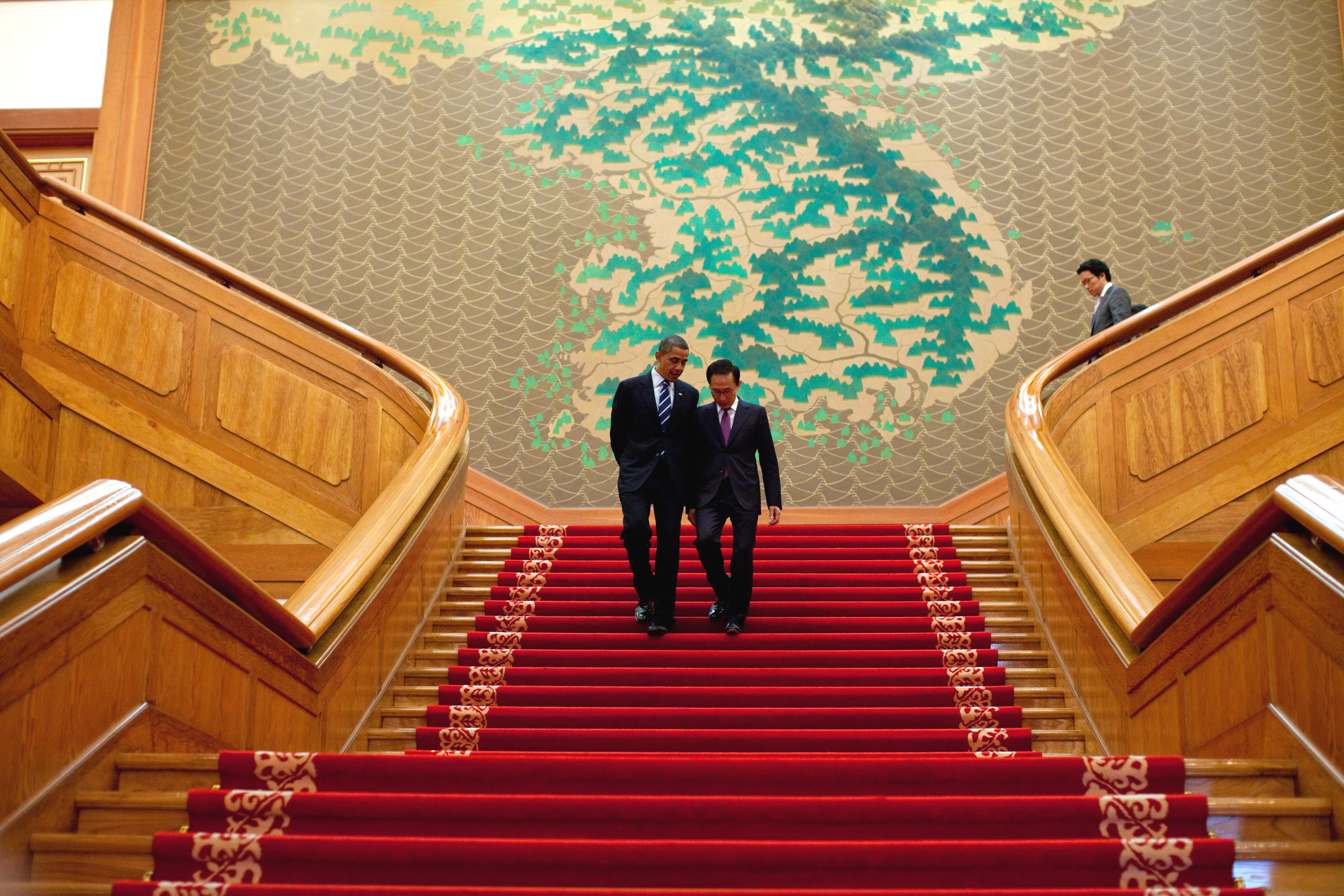
United States President Barack Obama and Lee walking after a meeting at the Blue House in Seoul in November 2010.

The United States engaged in the decolonization of Korea (mainly in the South, with the Soviet Union engaged in North Korea) from Japan after World War II. After three years of military administration by the United States, the South Korean government was established. Upon the onset of the Korean War, U.S. forces were sent to defend South Korea against invasion by North Korea and later China. Following the Armistice, South Korea and the U.S. agreed to a "Mutual Defense Treaty", under which an attack on either party in the Pacific area would summon a response from both.

In 1968, South Korea obliged the mutual defense treaty, by sending a large combat troop contingent to support the United States in the Vietnam War. The U.S. Eighth Army, Seventh Air Force, and U.S. Naval Forces Korea are stationed in South Korea. The two nations have strong economic, diplomatic, and military ties, although they have at times disagreed with regard to policies towards North Korea, and with regard to some of South Korea's industrial activities that involve usage of rocket or nuclear technology. There had also been strong anti-American sentiment during certain periods, which has largely moderated in the modern day.

Since the late 1980s, the country has instead sought to establish an American partnership, which has made the Seoul–Washington relationship subject to severe strains. Trade had become a serious source of friction between the two countries. In 1989, the United States was South Korea's largest and most important trading partner and South Korea was the seventh-largest market for United States goods and the second largest market for its agricultural products.

From Roh Tae-woo's administration to Roh Moo Hyun's administration, South Korea sought to establish a U.S. partnership, which has made the Seoul–Washington relationship subject to some strains. In 2007, a free trade agreement known as the Republic of Korea-United States Free Trade Agreement (KORUS FTA) was reportedly signed between South Korea and the United States, but its formal implementation has been repeatedly delayed, pending further approval by the legislative bodies of the two countries.

The relations between the United States and South Korea have greatly strengthened under the Lee Myung-bak administration. At the 2009 G-20 London summit, U.S. President Barack Obama called South Korea "one of America's closest allies and greatest friends."

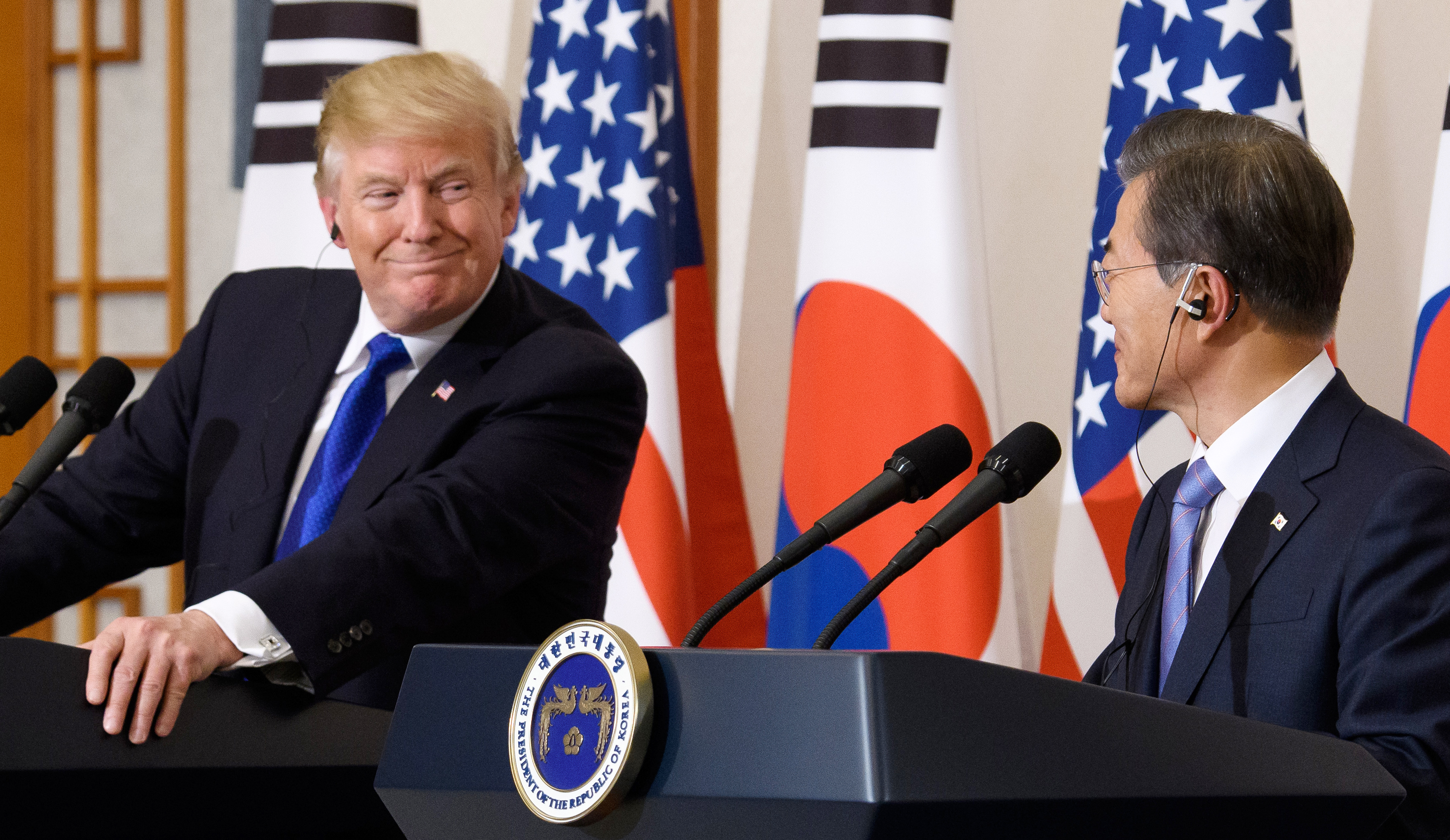
South Korean President Moon Jae-in with U.S. President Donald Trump in November 2017

However, some anti-American sentiment in South Korea still exists; the United States' alleged role in the May 1980 Gwangju uprising was a pressing South Korean political issue of the 1980s. Even after a decade, some Gwangju citizens and other South Koreans still blamed the United States for its perceived involvement in the bloody uprising. In 2008, the protests against U.S. beef was a center of a major controversy that year.

In a June 2010 open letter from President of South Korea Lee Myung-bak published in the Los Angeles Times, he expressed gratitude for the 37,000 Americans who were killed in the Korean War defending South Korea, saying that they fought for the freedom of South Koreans they did not even know. He stated that thanks to their sacrifices, the peace and democracy of the South Korean state was protected.

The U.S. states that "The Alliance is adapting to changes in the 21st Century security environment. We will maintain a robust defense posture, backed by allied capabilities which support both nations' security interests We will continue to deepen our strong bilateral economic, trade and investment relations In the Asia-Pacific region we will work jointly with regional institutions and partners to foster prosperity, keep the peace, and improve the daily lives of the people of the region The United States and South Korea will work to achieve our common Alliance goals through strategic cooperation at every level."

On 9 October 2024, South Korean Defence Minister Kim Yong-hyun emphasized the need for stronger joint military drills with the U.S. to counter North Korean threats and address concerns about growing North Korea-Russia military ties.

== Diplomatic relations ==
List of countries which South Korea maintains diplomatic relations with:

#	Country	Date
1	United Kingdom	18 January 1949
2	France	15 February 1949
3	Philippines	3 March 1949
4	United States	25 March 1949
5	Spain	17 March 1950
6	Italy	24 November 1956
7	Turkey	8 March 1957
8	Germany	25 May 1957
9	Thailand	1 October 1958
10	Norway	2 March 1959
11	Denmark	11 March 1959
12	Sweden	11 March 1959
13	Brazil	31 October 1959
14	Malaysia	23 February 1960
15	Netherlands	4 April 1961
16	Greece	5 April 1961
17	Portugal	15 April 1961
18	Belgium	2 May 1961
19	Ivory Coast	23 July 1961
20	Niger	27 July 1961
21	Benin	1 August 1961
22	Chad	6 August 1961
23	Cameroon	10 August 1961
24	Republic of the Congo	21 August 1961
25	Australia	30 October 1961
26	Mexico	26 January 1962
27	Nicaragua	26 January 1962
28	Argentina	15 February 1962
29	Colombia	10 March 1962
30	Luxembourg	16 March 1962
31	New Zealand	26 March 1962
32	Honduras	1 April 1962
33	Israel	10 April 1962
34	Chile	18 April 1962
35	Burkina Faso	20 April 1962
36	Dominican Republic	6 June 1962
37	Paraguay	12 June 1962
38	Madagascar	25 June 1962
39	Sierra Leone	25 June 1962
40	Morocco	6 July 1962
41	Jordan	26 July 1962
42	Costa Rica	15 August 1962
43	El Salvador	30 August 1962
44	Haiti	22 September 1962
45	Panama	30 September 1962
46	Gabon	1 October 1962
47	Ecuador	5 October 1962
48	Iceland	10 October 1962
49	Jamaica	13 October 1962
50	Saudi Arabia	16 October 1962
51	Senegal	19 October 1962
52	Iran	23 October 1962
53	Guatemala	24 October 1962
54	Canada	14 January 1963
55	Switzerland	11 February 1963
56	Rwanda	21 March 1963
57	Uganda	26 March 1963
58	Democratic Republic of the Congo	1 April 1963
59	Peru	1 April 1963
60	Austria	22 May 1963
61	Togo	26 July 1963
62	Mauritania	30 July 1963
63	Central African Republic	5 September 1963
64	Ethiopia	23 December 1963
65	Kenya	7 February 1964
66	Liberia	18 March 1964
67	Uruguay	7 October 1964
68	Malawi	9 March 1965
69	Malta	2 April 1965
70	Gambia	21 April 1965
71	Bolivia	25 April 1965
72	Venezuela	29 April 1965
73	Japan	18 December 1965
74	Lesotho	7 December 1966
75	Maldives	30 November 1967
76	Botswana	18 April 1968
77	Guyana	13 June 1968
78	Eswatini	6 November 1968
79	Tunisia	31 March 1969
80	Cambodia	18 May 1970
81	Tonga	11 September 1970
82	Fiji	30 January 1971
83	Mauritius	3 July 1971
84	Samoa	15 September 1972
85	Finland	24 August 1973
86	Indonesia	18 September 1973
87	India	10 December 1973
—	Holy See	11 December 1973
88	Bangladesh	18 December 1973
89	Afghanistan	31 December 1973
90	Oman	28 March 1974
91	Qatar	18 April 1974
92	Nepal	15 May 1974
93	Grenada	1 August 1974
94	Myanmar	16 May 1975
95	Singapore	8 August 1975
96	Suriname	28 November 1975
97	Bahrain	17 April 1976
98	Papua New Guinea	19 May 1976
99	Seychelles	29 June 1976
100	Sudan	13 April 1977
101	Ghana	14 November 1977
102	Sri Lanka	14 November 1977
103	Barbados	15 November 1977
104	Djibouti	7 December 1977
105	Solomon Islands	15 September 1978
106	Dominica	3 November 1978
107	Tuvalu	15 November 1978
108	Comoros	19 February 1979
109	Saint Lucia	23 February 1979
110	Kuwait	11 June 1979
111	Nauru	20 August 1979
112	Equatorial Guinea	14 September 1979
113	Saint Vincent and the Grenadines	28 October 1979
114	Nigeria	22 February 1980
115	Kiribati	2 May 1980
116	United Arab Emirates	18 June 1980
117	Vanuatu	5 November 1980
118	Libya	29 December 1980
119	Lebanon	12 February 1981
120	Antigua and Barbuda	1 November 1981
121	Saint Kitts and Nevis	19 September 1983
122	Ireland	4 October 1983
123	Pakistan	7 November 1983
124	Guinea-Bissau	22 December 1983
125	Brunei	1 January 1984
126	Bahamas	8 July 1985
127	Trinidad and Tobago	23 July 1985
128	Yemen	22 August 1985
129	Belize	14 April 1987
130	Bhutan	24 September 1987
131	Somalia	25 September 1987
132	São Tomé and Príncipe	20 August 1988
133	Cape Verde	3 October 1988
134	Hungary	1 February 1989
135	Iraq	9 July 1989
136	Poland	1 November 1989
137	Serbia	27 December 1989
138	Algeria	15 January 1990
139	Namibia	21 March 1990
140	Czech Republic	22 March 1990
141	Bulgaria	23 March 1990
142	Mongolia	26 March 1990
143	Romania	30 March 1990
144	Zambia	4 September 1990
145	Mali	27 September 1990
146	Russia	30 September 1990
147	Federated States of Micronesia	5 April 1991
148	Marshall Islands	5 April 1991
149	Albania	22 August 1991
150	Burundi	3 October 1991
151	Lithuania	14 October 1991
152	Estonia	17 October 1991
153	Latvia	22 October 1991
154	Angola	6 January 1992
155	Kazakhstan	28 January 1992
156	Uzbekistan	29 January 1992
157	Kyrgyzstan	31 January 1992
158	Moldova	31 January 1992
159	Turkmenistan	7 February 1992
160	Belarus	10 February 1992
161	Ukraine	10 February 1992
162	Armenia	21 February 1992
163	Azerbaijan	23 March 1992
164	Tajikistan	27 April 1992
165	Tanzania	30 April 1992
166	China	24 August 1992
167	Croatia	18 November 1992
168	Slovenia	18 November 1992
169	South Africa	1 December 1992
170	Georgia	14 December 1992
171	Vietnam	22 December 1992
172	Slovakia	1 January 1993
173	Liechtenstein	2 March 1993
174	Eritrea	24 May 1993
175	Mozambique	11 August 1993
176	Zimbabwe	18 November 1994
177	Andorra	23 February 1995
178	Palau	22 March 1995
179	Egypt	13 April 1995
180	Laos	25 October 1995
181	Bosnia and Herzegovina	15 December 1995
182	Cyprus	28 December 1995
183	San Marino	25 September 2000
184	Timor-Leste	20 May 2002
185	Guinea	28 August 2006
186	Montenegro	4 September 2006
187	Monaco	20 March 2007
188	South Sudan	9 July 2011
—	Cook Islands	22 February 2013
189	North Macedonia	18 July 2019
—	Niue	29 May 2023
190	Cuba	14 February 2024
191	Syria	10 April 2025

== Bilateral relations ==
=== Americas ===
Country	Formal relations began	Notes
Argentina	1962-02-15	See Argentina–South Korea relations: Argentina has an embassy in Seoul; South Korea has an embassy in Buenos Aires.
Brazil	1959-10-31	See Brazil–South Korea relations: Brazil has an embassy in Seoul.; South Korea has an embassy in Brasília.; In 2006, Korea's export in Brazil was 3.06 billion US dollars.
Canada	1963-01-14	See Canada–South Korea relations: Canadian soldiers participated in the defense of South Korea during the Korean War.; Full diplomatic relations were established on 14 January 1963.; Canada has an embassy in Seoul.; South Korea has an embassy in Ottawa and 3 consulate-generals in Montreal, Toronto and Vancouver.; Canada has a Working Holiday Program Agreement with South Korea.; Canada–South Korea Free Trade Agreement.
Chile	1962-04-18	See Chile–South Korea relations: Chile has a Working Holiday Program Agreement with South Korea; Chile-South Korea Free Trade Agreement.
Colombia	1962-03-10	See Colombia–South Korea relations: Formal diplomatic relations started on 10 March 1962.; Colombia sent more than 1,000 men to help South Korea during the Korean War.; Colombia has an embassy in Seoul.; South Korea has an embassy in Bogotá.; Colombian Ministry of Foreign Relations: direction of Colombian representation in South Korea
Cuba	2024-02-14	See Cuba–South Korea relations: Diplomatic relations were established on 14 February 2024.
Mexico	1962-01-26	See Mexico–South Korea relations: The establishment of diplomatic relations between Mexico and South Korea started on 26 January 1962.; Mexico has a Working Holiday Program Agreement with South Korea; Mexico has an embassy in Seoul.; South Korea has an embassy in Mexico City, Mexico.
Panama	1962-09-30	See Panama–South Korea relations
Paraguay	1962-06-12	See Paraguay–South Korea relations: Paraguay has an embassy in Seoul.; South Korea has an embassy in Asunción.; There are about 5,000 people of Korean descent living in Paraguay; Paraguayan gloria w/h Ministry of Foreign Relations about relations with Korea; South Korean Ministry of Foreign Affairs and Trade about relations with Paraguay
Peru	1963-04-01	See Peru–South Korea relations: In June 1993, Peruvian President Alberto Fujimori visited South Korea.; Peru has an embassy in Seoul.; South Korea has an embassy in Lima.; There are about 900 people of Korean descent living in Peru (See also Korean Peruvian).; Peruvian Ministry of Foreign Relations about relations with Korea; South Korean Ministry of Foreign Affairs and Trade about relations with Peru
United States	1882-05-22; 1949-01-01	See South Korea–United States relations: South Korea has an embassy in Washington, D.C.; The United States of America has an embassy in Seoul.; The establishment of diplomatic relations between the United States of America and South Korea began through its predecessor state Joseon, on 22 May 1882.; The United States has a Working Holiday Program Agreement with South Korea; Number of South Koreans living in the United States in 2013 was about 2.09 million.; The United States-South Korea have a Free Trade Agreement (KORUS FTA).
Uruguay	1964-10-07	See South Korea–Uruguay relations: In September 2008, Uruguayan President Tabaré Vázquez visited South Korea.; South Korea has an embassy in Montevideo.; Uruguay has an embassy in Seoul.; South Korean Ministry of Foreign Affairs and Trade about relations with Uruguay
Venezuela	1965-04-29	See South Korea–Venezuela relations

=== Asia ===
Country	Formal relations began	Notes
Afghanistan	1973-12-12	See Afghanistan – South Korea relations: The initial establishment of diplomatic relations between Afghanistan and South Korea began in December 1973 and lasted until September 1978.; The 2007 South Korean hostage crisis in Afghanistan was a major event in relations between the two countries. Two hostages were killed, and after the safe release of the remaining hostages, a Taliban official announced that South Korea had paid the Taliban more than US$20 million in ransom. However, South Korea stated that they have made a promise with the Taliban not to make any public statements about the ransom.
Bangladesh	1973-12-18	See Bangladesh–South Korea relations: The establishment of diplomatic relations between Bangladesh and South Korea began on 18 December 1973.; Bangladesh has diplomatic relations with both North Korea and South Korea; North Korea commenced diplomatic relations with Bangladesh in 1973.; In 1974, South Korea opened its embassy in the capital Dhaka while her counterpart in 1987.; In 2008, Ministry of Justice of South Korea ceased the protocol of visa exemption. It is decided in that illegal residents from Bangladesh have been over 13,000 through South Korea. Both nations should get permission from each country to enter from 15 July 2008.; Scale of bilateral trade between two nation is US$1.2 billion.
Bhutan	1987-09-24	See Bhutan–South Korea relations: The establishment of diplomatic relations between Bhutan and South Korea began in September 1987.; Bilateral Trade in 2012; Exports 3.27million US dollars.; Imports 382 thousand US dollars.; South Korea's Grant Aid to Bhutan, Total of $6.21million US dollars (1987–2012).
Brunei	1984-01-01	See Brunei–South Korea relations: The establishment of diplomatic relations between Brunei and South Korea began on 1 January 1984.; Bilateral Trade in 2013 was about 2,030 million US dollars.; Brunei Darussalam has an embassy in Seoul.; South Korea has an embassy in Bandar Seri Begawan, Brunei.; Both countries working closely in economic.
Cambodia	1970-05-18	See Cambodia–South Korea relations: The establishment of diplomatic relations between Cambodia and South Korea began on 18 May 1970 and lasted until 5 April 1975. They were re-established on 30 September 1997.; Bilateral Trade in 2013 750 million US dollars; Exports 610 million US dollars; Imports 140 million US dollars; The number of South Koreans living in the Kingdom of Cambodia in 2013 was about 5,000.
China	1992-08-24	See China–South Korea relations: The establishment of diplomatic relations between the People's Republic of China and South Korea began on 24 August 1992.; South Korea has an embassy in Beijing, China.; China has an embassy in Seoul.; South Korea's Investment in China (cumulative total at the end of 2014) about $3.7 billion.; Bilateral Trade in 2014 was about 235.4 billion US dollars.; Exports: $145.3 billion US dollars.; Imports: $90.1 billion US dollars.; People-to-People Exchanges, total of 10.3 million visitors; The number of South Korean visitors to China: 4.18million.; Number of Chinese visitors to South Korea: 6.12million.; Number of Long-Term Residents; South Korean long-term residents in China: 800.000.; Chinese long-term residents in the KOR: 780.000.
Republic of China (Taiwan)	1948-08-13; 1992-08-23	See South Korea–Taiwan relations: The establishment of diplomatic relations between Taiwan and South Korea began on 13 August 1948. They lasted until South Korea's establishment of diplomatic relations with the People's Republic of China (PRC) on 22 August 1992. Due to the One-China Policy required by the PRC as a prerequisite for establishing diplomatic relations, South Korea does not have diplomatic relations with Taiwan.; Taiwan has a Working Holiday Program Agreement with South Korea.; South Korea has a Mission Office in Taipei.; Taiwan has a Mission Office in Seoul and Busan.
East Timor	2002-05-20	The establishment of diplomatic relations between East Timor and South Korea began on 20 May 2002.; Bilateral Trade in 2012 was about 75 million US dollars.; Exports 7.7 million US dollars.; Imports 67 million US dollars.; South Korea's Investment in the East Timor (cumulative total as of 2012) 14 million US dollars.
Hong Kong	1945-05-01	The Hong Kong Special Administrative Region (Hong Kong SAR) government has a Working Holiday Program Agreement with South Korea.; The Hong Kong is a Special Administrative Region of China.; South Korea has a Consulate General in Hong Kong.; The Hong Kong Special Administrative Region of China has an overseas office in Seoul.; The Hong Kong Chief Executive Leung Chun-ying visited South Korea on 26 November 2014.
India	1973-12-01	See India – South Korea relations: During the Korean War, India sent military medical staff to support South Korea as a part of the United Nations troops.; Diplomatic relations between the two countries has been relatively limited, although much progress arose during the three decades. Since the formal establishment of the diplomatic ties between the two countries in 1973, several trade agreements have been reached: Agreement on Trade Promotion and Economic and Technological Cooperation in 1974; Agreement on Cooperation in Science & Technology in 1976; Convention on Double Taxation Avoidance in 1985; and Bilateral Investment Promotion/ Protection Agreement in 1996.; Trade between the two nations has increased exponentially, exemplified by the $530 million during the fiscal year of 1992–1993, and the $10 billion during 2006–2007. During the 1997 Asian financial crisis, South Korean businesses sought to increase access to the global markets, and began trade investments with India.
Indonesia	1973-09-17	See Indonesia–South Korea relations: South Korea has an embassy in Jakarta.; The Republic of Indonesia has an embassy in Seoul.; Scale of bilateral trade between two nation is US$14.88 billion.; South Korean Ministry of Foreign Affairs and Trade about relations with Indonesia; Indonesia and South Korea have invested in multiple joint military development projects, including the KFX/IFX fighter jet.; South Korean firm Daewoo Shipbuilding and Marine Engineering (DSME) is in final contract negotiations to supply Indonesia with three Type-209 submarines. This will be the largest ever bilateral defense deal, valued at US$1.1 billion.; Trade in National currencies and moving away from the US dollar.
Japan	1965-12-18	See Japan–South Korea relations: The establishment of diplomatic relations between Japan and South Korea began on 18 December 1965.; South Korea has an embassy in Tokyo, Japan.; The State of Japan has an embassy in Seoul.; The State of Japan has a Working Holiday Program Agreement with South Korea; Between the two countries's People-to-People Exchanges in 2014 was about 5.04 million visitors.
North Korea	No Relations	See North Korea–South Korea relations: North Korea and South Korea have not established diplomatic relations.
Laos	1974-06-22	See Laos–South Korea relations: The establishment of diplomatic relations between Laos and South Korea began on 22 June 1974, and lasted until 24 July 1975. They were reestablished on 25 October 1995.; Bilateral Trade in 2013 was about 199 million US dollars.; Exports 187 million US dollars.; Imports 12 million US dollars.; South Korea's Investment in the Laos (cumulative total as of 2011) 32 million US dollars.
Macau		The number of South Koreans living in the Macau in 2008 was about 320.; The number of South Korean visitors to Macau in 2008 was about 281,129.; South Korea's Investment in Macau was about 5,530 US dollars.
Malaysia	1960-02-23	See Malaysia–South Korea relations: The establishment of diplomatic relations between Malaysia and South Korea began on 23 February 1960.; Malaysia has an embassy in Seoul.; South Korea has an embassy in Kuala Lumpur, Malaysia.; The two countries established relations in 1960.; Scale of bilateral trade between two nation is US$15.7 billion.
Maldives	1967-11-30	See Maldives–South Korea relations: The establishment of diplomatic relations between the Maldives and South Korea began on 30 November 1967.; Bilateral Trade in 2012; Exports 3.67 million US dollars.; Imports 380 thousand US dollars.; The number of South Koreans visitors to Maldives in 2012 was 23,933.
Mongolia	1990-03-26	See Mongolia–South Korea relations: The establishment of diplomatic relations between Mongolia and South Korea started on 26 March 1990.; Bilateral Trade in 2013 was about 520 million US dollars.; Exports 507 million US dollars.; Imports 13 million US dollars.; Investment (cumulative total at the end of 2013) about 350 million US dollars.
Myanmar	1975-05-16	See Myanmar–South Korea relations: The establishment of diplomatic relations between Myanmar and South Korea began on 16 May 1975, when the former was known as Burma.; Bilateral Trade in 2012 was about 1,682 million US dollars; Exports 1,331million US dollars; Imports 351 million US dollars; The number of South Koreans living in Myanmar (Burma) in 2013 was about 2,300.
Nepal	1974-05-15	See Nepal–South Korea relations: The establishment of diplomatic relations between Nepal and South Korea started on 15 May 1974.; Nepal has an embassy in Seoul.; South Korea has an embassy in Kathmandu Nepal.; Scale of bilateral trade between two nation is 27.2 million US dollars.; South Korean Ministry of Foreign Affairs and Trade about relations with Nepal
Pakistan	1983-11-01	See Pakistan-South Korea relations: The establishment of diplomatic relations between Pakistan and South Korea started in November 1983.; Bilateral Trade in 2012 was about 1.33billion US dollars.; Exports 810 million US dollars.; Imports 520 million US dollars.; South Korea's Investment in Pakistan (total at December 2012) 100 million US dollars.
Philippines	1949-03-03	See Philippines–South Korea relations: The establishment of diplomatic relations between Philippines and South Korea started on 3 March 1949.; South Korea has an embassy in Manila, Philippines.; The Philippines has an embassy in Seoul.; Scale of bilateral trade between two nation is 6.8 billion US dollars.; South Korean Ministry of Foreign Affairs and Trade about relations with Philippines
Singapore	1975-08-08	See Singapore–South Korea relations: The establishment of diplomatic relations between Singapore and South Korea started on 8 August 1975.; Singapore has an embassy in Seoul.; South Korea has an embassy in Singapore.; Scale of bilateral trade between two nation is 24.7 billion US dollars.; South Korean Ministry of Foreign Affairs and Trade about relations with Singapore
Sri Lanka	1977-11-14	See Sri Lanka–South Korea relations: The establishment of diplomatic relations between Sri Lanka and South Korea started on 14 November 1977.; South Korea has an embassy in Colombo.; Sri Lanka has an embassy in Seoul.; Scale of bilateral trade between two nation is 686 million US dollars.; South Korean Ministry of Foreign Affairs and Trade about relations with Sri Lanka
Thailand	1958-10-09	See South Korea – Thailand relations: The establishment of diplomatic relations between Thailand and South Korea started in October 1958.; During the Korean War, Thailand was the second state sending troops for supporting South Korea just after United States. In October 2003, South Korean president Roh Moo-hyun visited Thailand while Prime Minister Thaksin Shinawatra to Seoul in November 2005.; The Republic of Korea is Thailand's 10th largest trade partner, which is due to reach the scale of 10 billion US dollars.; South Korean Ministry of Foreign Affairs and Trade about relations with Thailand
Vietnam	1992-12-22	See Vietnam–South Korea relations: The establishment of diplomatic relations between Vietnam and South Korea started on 22 December 1992.; South Korea has an embassy in Hanoi.; Vietnam has an embassy in Seoul.; Scale of bilateral trade between two nation is 9.8 billion US dollars.; South Korean Ministry of Foreign Affairs and Trade about relations with Vietnam

=== Oceania ===
Country	Formal relations began	Notes
Australia	1961-10-31	See Australia–South Korea relations: The establishment of diplomatic relations between Australia and South Korea began on 31 October 1961.; Scale of bilateral trade between two nation is US$23.2 billion.; During the Korean War, Australia sent 17,000 soldiers to offer military cooperation with South Korea.; Australia has a Working Holiday Program Agreement with South Korea and There is no quota to Australian citizens.; South Korea has a consulate general in Sydney and an embassy in Canberra.; Australia has an embassy in Seoul.; Prime Minister Julia Gillard visited Seoul in 2011. while South Korean president Lee Myung-bak visited Australia in 2009.; Economic ties have been strengthened while merchandise trade value between the two reached almost 26 billion dollars in 2008–2009.; Australia–Korea Free Trade Agreement
Fiji	1970-10-01	See Fiji–South Korea relations: The Republic of the Fiji Islands and South Korea established official diplomatic relations in 1970, when the Republic of Fiji became independent.; South Korea embassy in Suva Republic of Fiji.; Fiji embassy in Seoul.; South Korea's Investment in Fiji (cumulative amount at the end of 2013) 73.3 million US dollars.; South Korean Ministry of Foreign Affairs and Trade about relations with Fiji
New Zealand	1962-03-01	See New Zealand–South Korea relations: The establishment of diplomatic relations between New Zealand and South Korea began on 1 March 1962.; During the Korean War, New Zealand has sent 5,350 New Zealand soldiers to offer military cooperation with South Korea.; Republic of Korea has a consulate general in Auckland and an embassy in Wellington New Zealand.; New Zealand has an embassy in Seoul.; Scale of bilateral trade between two nation is US$1.94 billion.; New Zealand–Korea Free Trade Agreement.; New Zealand has a Working Holiday Program Agreement with the South Korea.; South Korean Ministry of Foreign Affairs and Trade about relations with New Zealand
Niue	29 May 2023	See Niue–South Korea relations: In May 2011 Foreign Ministers of Korea and Niue have had Foreign Ministers's Meeting.

=== Europe ===
Country	Formal relations began	Notes
Albania	1991-08-22	See Albania–South Korea relations: The establishment of diplomatic relations between the Republic of Albania and South Korea began on 22 August 1991.; Minister of Foreign Affairs and Trade Ban Ki-moon and Minister of Foreign Affairs of the Republic of Albania Besnik Mustafaj signed the Convention between the government of the Republic of Korea and the Council of Ministers of the Albania for the Avoidance of Double Taxation with Respect to Taxes on Income and for the Prevention of Fiscal Evasion on 17 May 2006.
Andorra	1995-02-23	See Andorra–South Korea relations: The establishment of diplomatic relations between the Principality of Andorra and South Korea began on 23 February 1995.; Bilateral Exchange in 2014: None.; Bilateral trade in 2014 was valued at 315,000 US dollars.; 2007 June Minister for Government Policy Coordination Im Sang-gyu.; 2008 August Foreign Minister Meritxell Mateu Pi.
Armenia	1992-02-21	See Armenia–South Korea relations: The establishment of diplomatic relations between Armenia and South Korea began on 21 February 1992.; The Republic of Korea and Armenia Policy Consultation will deal with ways to vitalize high-level exchanges promote substantive cooperation and work together on regional and global issues.
Austria	1963-05-22	See Austria–South Korea relations: The establishment of diplomatic relations between Austria and South Korea started on 22 May 1963.; Austria has an embassy in Seoul and an honorary consulate in Busan.; South Korea has an embassy in Vienna and 4 honorary consulates in Graz, Klagenfurt, Linz and Salzburg Republic of Austria.; In April 2007 the President of Austria Heinz Fischer paid a state visit to South Korea. It was the first ever state visit of an Austrian president to the republic.; Austria has a Working Holiday Program Agreement with the Republic of Korea; Austrian Foreign Ministry: list of bilateral treaties with South Korea (in German only); South Korean Ministry of Foreign Affairs and Trade about relations with Austria
Azerbaijan	1992-03-23	See Azerbaijan–South Korea relations: The establishment of diplomatic relations between South Korea and the Republic of Azerbaijan began on 23 March 1992.; The Republic of Korea embassy in Azerbaijan held a briefing for journalists and officials from the Ministry of Foreign Affairs and Trade.; Azerbaijan has an embassy in Seoul.; South Korea has an embassy in Baku.
Belarus	1992-02-10	See Belarus–South Korea relations: The establishment of diplomatic relations between South Korea and the Belarus began on 10 February 1992.; Bilateral Trade in 2014, $86 million US dollars.; Belarus has an embassy and an honorary consulate in Seoul.; South Korea has an embassy in Minsk.; South Korean Ministry of Foreign affairs and Trade about relations with Belarus
Bosnia and Herzegovina	1995-12-15	See Bosnia and Herzegovina–South Korea relations: The establishment of diplomatic relations between the Bosnia Herzegovina and South Korea and began on 15 December 1995.; The Republic of Korea and Bosnia Herzegovina Policy Consultation was held in Sarajevo on 9 July with MOFAT's Deputy Minister for Political Affairs Lee Yong-joon and his Bosnian counterpart Ana Trisic-Babic leading their respective delegations.
Bulgaria	1990-03-23	See Bulgaria – South Korea relations: The establishment of diplomatic relations between the Republic of Bulgaria and South Korea began on 23 March 1990.; Bulgaria has an embassy in Seoul.; South Korea has an embassy in Sofia, Bulgaria.; Bilateral Trade in 2014 was about 308 million US dollars.; South Korean Ministry of Foreign Affairs and Trade about relations with Bulgaria
Croatia	1992-11-18	See Croatia–South Korea relations: The Establishment of diplomatic relations between Croatia and South Korea began on 18 November 1992.; Croatia has an embassy in Seoul.; South Korea has an embassy in Zagreb.; Croatian Ministry of Foreign Affairs: list of bilateral treaties with South Korea; South Korean Ministry of Foreign Affairs and Trade about relations with Croatia
Cyprus	1995-12-28	See Cyprus–South Korea relations: The establishment of diplomatic relations between the Republic of Korea and the Republic of Cyprus began on 28 December 1995.; Cyprus is represented in South Korea through a non-resident ambassador based in Canberra, Australia.; South Korea is represented in Cyprus through a non-resident ambassador based in Athens Greece and an honorary consulate in Nicosia.; South Korean Ministry of Foreign Affairs about relations with Cyprus
Czech Republic	1990-03-22	See Czech Republic–South Korea relations: The establishment of diplomatic relations between the Czech Republic and South Korea began on 22 March 1990.; South Korea has had an embassy in Prague since 1990.; The Czech Republic has had an embassy in Seoul since 1991.; There is also the Czech Info Center in Seoul.; The Czech Republic has a Working Holiday Program Agreement with the Republic of Korea; According to the Ministry of Foreign Affairs and Trade of the Republic of Korea there were 1,100 South Koreans living in the Czech Republic.; South Korean Ministry of Foreign Affairs about relations with Czech Republic
Denmark	1902-07-15; 1959-03-11	See Denmark – South Korea relations: The establishment of diplomatic relations between the Denmark and South Korea began on 11 March 1959.; The number of South Koreans living in Denmark in 2012 was about 538.; Denmark has an embassy in Seoul.; South Korea has an embassy in Copenhagen.; During the Korean War, Denmark sent Danish medical staff to support South Korea as a part of the United Nations troops.; Denmark has a Working Holiday Program Agreement with the Republic of Korea. There is no quota to Danish citizens.; In October 2007, Queen of Denmark (Margrethe II of Denmark) visited Seoul for the first time after the official diplomacy between both nations.; South Korean Ministry of Foreign Affairs and Trade about relations with Denmark
Estonia	1991-10-17	See Estonia–South Korea relations: The establishment of diplomatic relations between Estonia and South Korea began on 17 October 1991.; Estonia has an embassy in Seoul.; South Korea is represented in Estonia through its embassy in Helsinki, Finland and through an honorary consulate in Tallinn.; In 2006 South Korea was ranked as Estonia's 35th export partner and 29th import partner. Estonia's exports to South Korea consist primarily of machinery and mechanical appliances and wood items. The main import articles are transport vehicles and mechanical inventory. The total value of exports to South Korea in 2006 was 19.2 million EUR while imports totalled 34.6 million EUR.; South Korean Ministry of Foreign Affairs and Trade about relations with Estonia
Finland	1973-08-24	See Finland–South Korea relations: The establishment of diplomatic relations between Finland and South Korea began on 24 August 1973.; Finland has an embassy in Seoul.; South Korea has an embassy in Helsinki.; Bilateral Trade in 2014 was about 1,696,000,000 US dollars; Bilateral Investment in 2014 was about 222,790,000 US dollars; Finnish Ministry of Foreign Affairs: relations with South Korea; South Korean Ministry of Foreign Affairs and Trade about relations with Finland
France	1886-06-04; 1949-02-15	See France – South Korea relations: The establishment of diplomatic relations between the France and South Korea began on 15 February 1949.; France and South Korea still maintain very good relations. They collaborate on many topics and issues, such as the question of North Korea which is a matter of great importance for both countries. Besides bilateral cooperation France and South Korea also work together in International organizations such as the United Nations, UNESCO, the OECD etc. On the matter of North Korea. France is one of the few European countries to not have official diplomatic relations with the North Korea. France has also supported the Six-party talks as well as the role of the IAEA in finding solutions to the nuclear issue.; France has a Working Holiday Program Agreement with South Korea.; The number of South Koreans living in France in 2012 was about 14,000.; South Korea has an embassy in Paris.; France has an embassy in Seoul.; President of the Republic of Korea Park Geun-hye visited France in November 2013.; South Korean Ministry of Foreign Affairs and Trade about relations with France
Georgia	1992-12-14	See Georgia–South Korea relations: The establishment of diplomatic relations between the Republic of Georgia and South Korea started on 14 December 1992.; The number of South Koreans living in the Georgia in 2014 was about 50.; Bilateral Trade in 2014 was about 162 million US dollars.; Georgia has an embassy in Seoul.; South Korea has an embassy in Tbilisi.
Germany	1883-11-26; 1955-12-01	See Germany – South Korea relations: The establishment of diplomatic relations between Germany and South Korea began in December 1955.; Germany has an embassy in Seoul (South Korea).; Bilateral trade and investment between Germany and the Republic of Korea were 45,000 million US dollars $ in 2014.; South Korea has an embassy in Berlin and consulates in Frankfurt and Hamburg.; The number of South Koreans living in Germany in 2011 was about 31,000, Germany has a Working Holiday Program Agreement with the Republic of Korea. There is no quota to German citizens.; Foreign relations of the Federal Republic of Germany.; German Chancellor Angela Merkel has visited South Korea in November 2010.; President of the Republic of Korea Park Geun-hye has visited the Federal Republic of Germany March 2014.; South Korean Ministry of Foreign Affairs and Trade Yun Byung-se has visited Germany in 2015.; South Korean Ministry of Foreign Affairs and Trade about relations with Germany
Greece	1961-04-05	See Greece–South Korea relations: The establishment of diplomatic relations between Greece and South Korea began on 5 April 1961.; Greece sent an expeditionary force to help South Koreans against the communists during the Korean War.; South Korea opened its embassy in Athens on 6 July 1973.; Greece opened its embassy in Seoul in October 1991.; Greek Ministry of Foreign Affaires about relations with South Korea; South Korean Ministry of Foreign Affairs and Trade about relations with Greece
Holy See	1966-09-01	See Holy See–South Korea relations: The establishment of diplomatic relations between the Holy See and South Korea began on 1 September 1966.; The Holy See Has a nunciature in Seoul.; The current (as of 2008) South Korean ambassador to the Holy See is "Kim Ji-Young" (Christian name Francis).; The Pope John Paul II visited the Republic of Korea twice during his pontificate, in 1984 and 1989. – 1984 visit to Seoul was for the canonization of the 103 Korean martyrs held outside Rome Italy in a break from tradition.; In 2000 then president of the Republic of Korea, Kim Dae Jung made a state visit to Vatican City the first South Korean head of state to do so.
Hungary	1989-02-01	See Hungary–South Korea relations: The Republic of Hungary–the Republic of Korea relations date back to the exchange of permanent missions between the two countries announced during the 1988 Summer Olympics in Seoul The announcement made Hungary the first Eastern Bloc country to exchange ambassadors with South Korea At the time, a large number of officials from various Communist countries were in Seoul having ignored North Korea's call for a boycott of the Olympics along with Hungary they also made various formal and informal contacts with South Korean government.; Hungary has a Working Holiday Program Agreement with the Republic of Korea; The South Korean embassy is in Budapest .; Hungary has an embassy in Seoul.; South Korean Ministry of Foreign Affairs and Trade about relations with Hungary
Iceland	1962-10-10	See Iceland–South Korea relations: The establishment of diplomatic relations between the Iceland and South Korea began on 10 October 1962.; Bilateral Trade in 2014 was about 57,000,000 US dollars.; Bilateral Investments (from 1962 to 2014) about 5,140,000 US dollars.; Minister of Foreign Affairs Halldor Ásgrímsson has visited South Korea in August 1996.; Minister of Foreign Affairs Choi has visited Iceland in September 2002.
Ireland	1983-10-01	See Ireland–South Korea relations: The establishment of diplomatic relations between Ireland and South Korea started on 1 October 1983.; Ireland has an embassy and an honorary consulate in Seoul.; South Korea has an embassy in Dublin.; As of July 2009, the ambassador of Ireland to South Korea is Eamonn C. McKee.; Both countries are full members of the Organisation for Economic Co-operation and Development.; Ireland has a Working Holiday Program Agreement with South Korea.; South Korean Ministry of Foreign Affairs and Trade about relations with Ireland
Italy	1884-06-26; 1956-11-24	See Italy – South Korea relations: The establishment of diplomatic relations between the Italy and South Korea began on 24 November 1956.; Bilateral Trade and Investment between Italy and the Republic of Korea were about 10,926,000,000. US dollars in 2014.; Bilateral Investments in 2014; South Korea's Investment in Italy 654,000,000 US dollars.; Italy's Investment in South Korea 539,000,000 US dollars.; During the Korean War, Italy sent medical staff to support South Korea.; Italy has an embassy in Seoul.; South Korea has an embassy in Rome.; The number of South Koreans living in Italy in 2012 was about 4,054.; The Italian Prime Minister Mario Monti has visited to attend Seoul Nuclear Security Summit in March 2012.; The South Korean President Park Geun-hye has visited to Italy October 2014.; Italy has a Working Holiday Program Agreement with the Republic of Korea; South Korean Ministry of Foreign Affairs and Trade about relations with Italy
Kazakhstan	1992-01-28	See Kazakhstan–South Korea relations: The establishment of diplomatic relations between the Republic of Kazakhstan and South Korea started on 28 January 1992.; The number of South Koreans living in Kazakhstan in 2013 was about 100,000.; Kazakhstan has an embassy in Seoul.; South Korea has an embassy in Astana.; Bilateral Trade in 2013 was about 1,323 million US dollars.
Latvia	1991-10-22	See Latvia–South Korea relations: The establishment of diplomatic relations between the Republic of Latvia and South Korea began in October 1991.; Latvia has an embassy in Seoul.; South Korea has an embassy in Riga.; The number of South Koreans living in Latvia in 2012 was about 41.; Bilateral Trade in 2014 was about 166,000,000 US dollars.; In 2019, South Korean MOFA was taught from Latvia that the country belongs to the Baltic region, not Balkans.
Liechtenstein	1993-03-01	See Liechtenstein–South Korea relations: The establishment of diplomatic relations between the Principality of Liechtenstein and South Korea started in 1993.; Bilateral Trade in 2013; Exports 4.5 million US dollars; Imports $8.7 million US dollars
Lithuania	1991-10-14	See Lithuania–South Korea relations: The establishment of diplomatic relations between the Republic of Lithuania and South Korea began in October 1991.; Lithuania has an embassy in Seoul.; South Korea has an embassy in Vilnius.; The number of South Koreans living in the Lithuania in 2012 was about 106.; Bilateral Trade in 2014 was about 3,485,000 US dollars.
Luxembourg	1962-03-16	See Luxembourg–South Korea relations: The establishment of diplomatic relations between Luxembourg and South Korea started in March 1962.; Bilateral Trade in 2014; Exports 572,000,000 US dollars; Imports: $39,000,000 US dollars; The number of South Koreans living in the Luxembourg in 2012 was about 61.
North Macedonia	2019-07-18	See North Macedonia–South Korea relations: The establishment of diplomatic relations between North Macedonia and South Korea started on 18 July 2019.; Bilateral Trade in 2014; Exports 9.4 million US dollars; Imports 2.1 million US dollars; Macedonian Prime Minister Nikola Gruevski visited South Korea in July 2014.
Malta	1965-04-02	See Malta–South Korea relations: The establishment of diplomatic relations between the Republic of Malta and South Korea started in April 1965.; Bilateral Trade in 2014; Exports: $1,014,000,000 US dollars; Imports: $514,000,000 US dollars; Bilateral Investments in 2014 was about 5,419,490,000. US dollars
Moldova	1992-01-31	See Moldova–South Korea relations: The establishment of diplomatic relations between the Republic of Moldova and South Korea started on 31 January 1992.; The number of South Koreans living in the Republic of Moldova in about 130.; Bilateral Trade in 2014; Exports 10 million US dollars; Imports 18 million US dollars
Monaco	2007-03-20	See Monaco–South Korea relations: The establishment of diplomatic relations between the Principality of Monaco and South Korea began on 31 March 2007.; Bilateral Trade in 2014; Export 241,000,000 US dollars; Imports 1,460,000 US dollars; Former foreign minister Yu Myung-hwan has attended the 6th World Policy Conference in Monaco on 13–15 December as Special Envoy of the President.
Montenegro	2006-06-04	See Montenegro–South Korea relations: The establishment of diplomatic relations between the Republic of Montenegro and South Korea started on 4 September 2006.; Bilateral Trade in 2014; Export $0.935 million; Imports:$0.027 million; The Montenegrin Deputy Prime Minister has visited South Korea in October 2014.
Netherlands	1961-04-01	See Netherlands–South Korea relations: The establishment of diplomatic relations between South Korea and the Netherlands began on 1 April 1961.; South Korea has an embassy in The Hague.; The Netherlands has an embassy in Seoul.; The Netherlands has a Working Holiday Program Agreement with South Korea. Citizens of both countries can live and work for up to 2 years in the other.; The number of South Koreans living in the Netherlands in 2012 was about 2,602.; South Korean Ministry of Foreign affairs and Trade about relations with Netherlands
Norway	1959-03-02	See Norway–South Korea relations: The establishment of diplomatic relations between Norway and South Korea began on 2 March 1959.; South Korea has an embassy in Oslo.; The Kingdom of Norway (Norway) has an embassy in Seoul .; The number of South Koreans living in the Kingdom of Norway in 2012 was about 692.; South Korean Ministry of Foreign Affairs and Trade about the relations with Norway
Poland	1989-11-01	See Poland–South Korea relations: The establishment of diplomatic relations between the Rzeczpospolita Polska (Republic of Poland) and South Korea began on 1 November 1989.; South Korea has an embassy in Warsaw Republic of Poland.; The Republic of Poland has an embassy in Seoul.; The number of South Koreans living in the Republic of Poland about 1,413.; Bilateral Trade in 2014; Exports 38.5 billion US dollars.; Imports 7.7 billion US dollars.; South Korean Ministry of Foreign affairs and Trade about relations with Poland
Romania	1990-03-30	See Romania – South Korea relations: The establishment of diplomatic relations between the România (Romania) and South Korea began on 30 March 1990.; The România (Romania) has an embassy in Seoul and 2 honorary consulates in Seoul and Busan Republic of Korea.; South Korea has an embassy in Bucharest Romania.; The Republic of Korea's Investment in Romania about 560 million US dollars.; In 2009, South Korea's export in Romania was 380,000,000 US dollar.
Russia	1884-07-07; 1990-09-30	See Russia–South Korea relations: The establishment of diplomatic relations between the Russian Federation and South Korea began on 30 September 1990.; The Russian Federation has an embassy in Seoul.; South Korea has a consulate general Office in Vladivostok and has an embassy in Moscow; President of the Russian Federation, Vladimir Putin has visited Republic of Korea in November 2013.; President of the Republic of Korea Lee Myung-bak has visited Russia in November 2011.; Russia and South Korea's Bilateral Trade in 2013 was about $22.64 billion US dollars.; The Republic of Korea's Investment in Russia in 2013 was about $2,962 million US dollars.; The Number of Ethnic Koreans living in Russia about 210,000 and South Koreans living in the Russian Federation in 2013 was about 5,350.
Serbia	1989-12-27	See Serbia–South Korea relations: The establishment of diplomatic relations between the Republika Srbija (Republic of Serbia) and South Korea began on 27 December 1989.; The Република Србија (Serbia) has an embassy in Seoul.; South Korea has an embassy in Belgrade, Serbia; The number of South Koreans living in Republic of Serbia in 2014 was about 117.; Bilateral Trade in 2014 was about 163 million US dollars.
Slovakia	1993-01-01	See Slovakia–South Korea relations: The establishment of diplomatic relations between the Slovak Republic and South Korea began in January 1993.; Slovakia has an embassy in Seoul.; South Korea has an embassy in Bratislava Slovak Republic.; Bilateral Trade in 2014 was about 45 billion US dollars.; The Republic of Korea's Investment in the Slovak Republic in 2014 million US dollars.
Slovenia	1992-04-15	See Slovenia–South Korea relations: The establishment of diplomatic relations between the Republic of Slovenia and South Korea began on 4 April 1992.; Slovenia has an embassy in Seoul.; South Korea has an embassy in Ljubljana Republic of Slovenia.; The number of South Koreans living in the Republic of Slovenia in 2013 January, 25.; Bilateral Trade in 2014 was about 1,791 million US dollars.
Spain	1950-03-17	See Spain–South Korea relations: The establishment of diplomatic relations between the Spain and South Korea began on 17 March 1950.; South Korea has an embassy in Madrid.; Spain has an embassy in Seoul.; The number of South Koreans living in the Spain in 2012 was about 3,787.; Bilateral Trade in 2014 was about 4,959,000,000 US dollars.; Bilateral Investments (from 1950 to 2014) about 2,147,000,000 US dollars.; The Queen Sophia, Prince Felipe, Princess Christina have visited South Korea in September 1988 and Spanish Prime Minister Rajoy visited to attend Seoul Nuclear Security Summit in March 2012.; South Korean Ministry of Foreign affairs and Trade about relations with Spain
Sweden	1959-03-07	See Sweden–South Korea relations: The establishment of diplomatic relations between the Republic of Korea and Sweden began on 11 March 1959.; South Korea has an embassy in Stockholm.; Sweden has an embassy in Seoul.; Sweden has a Working Holiday Program Agreement with the Republic of Korea. There is no quota to Swedish citizens.; The number of South Koreans living in Sweden in 2012 was 2,602.; Bilateral Trade in 2014; Exports 871,000,000 US dollars; Imports 1,799,000,000 US dollars; South Korean Ministry of Foreign Affairs and Trade about the relations with Sweden
Switzerland	1963-02-11	See Switzerland–South Korea relations: The establishment of diplomatic relations between South Korea and the Switzerland began on 11 February 1963.; South Korea has an embassy in Bern.; Switzerland has an embassy in Seoul.; South Korean Ministry of Foreign Affairs and Trade about the relations with Switzerland; Swiss Federal Department of Foreign Affairs about the relations with South Korea
Tajikistan	1992-04-27	See Tajikistan–South Korea relations: The establishment of diplomatic relations between the Republic of Tajikistan and South Korea began on 27 April 1992.; Bilateral Trade in 2013 was about 44 million US dollar.; Exports 44 million US dollar.; Imports 0.18 million US dollar.; Investment of South Korea in the Republic of Tajikistan in 2013 was about 63 million US dollars.
Turkey	1957-03-08	See Turkey–South Korea relations: The establishment of diplomatic relations between South Korea and the Republic of Turkey began on 8 March 1957.; During the Korean War, 14,936 Turkish Armed Forces were sent to support South Korea as a part of the United Nations troops.; South Korea has an embassy in Ankara.; Turkey has an embassy in Seoul.; In 2009, Korea's export with Turkey was 2,661 million US dollar.; South Korean Ministry of Foreign Affairs and Trade about relations with Turkey
Turkmenistan	1992-02-07	See Turkmenistan–South Korea relations: The establishment of diplomatic relations between the Republic of Turkmenistan and South Korea began on 7 February 1992.; The number of South Koreans living in the Republic of Turkmenistan in 2013 was about 320.; Number of Ethnic Koreans living in the Republic of Turkmenistan about 1,060.; Bilateral Trade in 2013 was about 141 million US dollar.; Exports 141 million US dollar and Imports 0.12 million US dollar.
Ukraine	1992-02-10	See Ukraine–South Korea relations: The establishment of diplomatic relations between South Korea and Ukraine began on 10 February 1992.; South Korea has an embassy in Kyiv; Ukraine has an embassy in Seoul.; Around 12,000 Koreans live in Ukraine. There is also a Korean association in Kharkiv.; South Korean Ministry of Foreign Affairs and Trade about relations with Ukraine
Uzbekistan	1992-01-29	See Uzbekistan–South Korea relations: The establishment of diplomatic relations between the Republic of Uzbekistan and South Korea began on 29 January 1992.; Bilateral Trade in 2013 was about 2,020 million US dollars; Exports 1,968 million US dollars; Imports 53million US dollars; The number of South Koreans living in the Republic of Uzbekistan in 2013 was about 2,500.; Number of Ethnic Koreans living in the Republic of Uzbekistan about 180,000.
United Kingdom	1883-11-26; 1949-01-18	See South Korea–United Kingdom relations South Korean Foreign Minister Cho Tae-yul and UK Foreign Secretary David Lammy in Laos, July 2024 South Korea established diplomatic relations with the United Kingdom on 18 January 1949.: South Korea maintains an embassy in London.; The United Kingdom is accredited to South Korea through its embassy in Seoul.; Both countries share common membership of the G20, the International Criminal Court, the OECD, the United Nations, and the World Trade Organization. Bilaterally the two countries have a Double Taxation Convention, the Downing Street Accord, and a Trade Agreement. The two countries are negotiating a new Free Trade Agreement.: During the Korean War The United Kingdom has sent 56,000 soldiers to support South Korea as a part of the United Nations (UN) troops.; South Korea has an embassy in London, United Kingdom.; The United Kingdom has an embassy in Seoul.; The United Kingdom has a Tier 5 Visa (Youth Mobility Scheme) Agreement with the Republic of Korea.; Bilateral Trade in 2014; Exports 5,785,000,000 US dollar.; Imports 7,441,000,000 US dollar.; Bilateral Investments 1949–2014; South Korea's Investment in the UK 12,261,000,000 US dollar.; The UK's Investment in South Korea 12,537,000,000 US dollar.; South Korean Ministry of Foreign affairs and Trade about relations with United Kingdom
Vatican City	1963-12-11	See Vatican City–South Korea relations: South Korea has an embassy in Vatican City; The Vatican City has an embassy in Republic of Korea.

=== Middle East and Africa ===
Country	Formal relations began	Notes
Algeria	1990-01-15	See Algeria–South Korea relations
Egypt	1995-04-13	See Egypt–South Korea relations: The establishment of diplomatic relations between Egypt and South Korea began on 13 April 1995.
Gabon	1962-10-01	See Gabon–South Korea relations
Ghana	1977-11-14	See Ghana–South Korea relations: The establishment of diplomatic relations between Ghana and South Korea began on 14 November 1977.
Iran	1962-10-23	See Iran–South Korea relations: The establishment of diplomatic relations between Iran and South Korea began on 23 October 1962.; Iran has an embassy in Seoul.; South Korea has an embassy in Tehran, Iran.; South Korea's Investment in Iran 54 million US dollars.; The number of South Koreans living in Iran in 2012 was about 506.; South Korean Ministry of Foreign Affairs and Trade about relations with Iran
Israel	1962-04-10	See Israel–South Korea relations: Both countries established diplomatic relations on 10 April 1962.; Since August 1968 the State of Israel has an embassy in Seoul.; In February 1978 the State of Israel closed its embassy in Seoul it was reopened in January 1992.; Since December 1993, South Korea has an embassy in Tel Aviv State of Israel.; The State of Israel has a Working Holiday Program Agreement with the Republic of Korea; South Korean Ministry of Foreign Affairs and Trade about the relation with Israel
Ivory Coast	1961-07-23	See Ivory Coast–South Korea relations: The establishment of diplomatic relations between the Ivory Coast and South Korea began on 23 July 1961.; Since 1966 South Korea has an embassy in Abidjan, Ivory Coast.
Jordan	1962-07-26	See Jordan–South Korea relations: The establishment of diplomatic relations between the Kingdom of Jordan and South Korea began on 26 July 1962.
Kenya	1964-02-07	See Kenya–South Korea relations: The establishment of diplomatic relations between the Republic of Kenya and South Korea began on 7 February 1962.
Saudi Arabia	1962-10-16	See Saudi Arabia–South Korea relations: The establishment of diplomatic relations between the Kingdom of Saudi Arabia and South Korea began on 16 October 1962.; In business, the Kingdom of Saudi Arabia is the largest exporter of oil to the Republic of Korea (300,000,000 barrels, 2014) Also, ARAMCO Korea was established in 2012. In 2016, two-way trade volume reached US$29.04 billion with South Korea exporting cars, electronic goods, steel and other items to Saudi Arabia and importing oil and other petrochemical products from it. Now, South Korea is described as a "core" partner for the Saudi Vision 2030 project, noting progress in joint efforts to flesh out their cooperation scheme to realize the vision.; On the matter of North Korea. Saudi Arabia is one of the few Asian countries to not have official diplomatic relations with the North Korea.; South Korea has an embassy in Riyadh and a consulate in Jeddah; Saudi Arabia has an embassy in Seoul
Somalia	1987-09-25	See Somalia–South Korea relations: The establishment of diplomatic relations between Somalia and South Korea began on 25 September 1987.
South Africa	1992-12-01	See South Africa–South Korea relations: The establishment of the current spate of diplomatic relations between South Africa and South Korea started on 1 December 1992. South Korea had previously had diplomatic relations South Africa from 1961 until 1978, when they were discontinued after United Nations Security Council Resolution 418, which was passed in protest of apartheid.; During the Korean War, South Africa sent over the 2 Squadron SAAF to offer military cooperation with South Korea.; South Korea has an embassy in Pretoria, South Africa.; South Africa has an embassy in Seoul.; South Korean Ministry of Foreign Affairs and Trade about relations with South Africa
United Arab Emirates	1980-06-18	See South Korea–United Arab Emirates relations: Both countries established diplomatic relations on 18 June 1980.; South Korea has an embassy Abu Dhabi.; The United Arab Emirates has an embassy in Seoul.; In 2009, a consortium led by Korea Electric Power Corporation (KEPCO) won a $20 billion contract to construct the UAE's Barakah Nuclear Power Plant, South Korea's first commercial nuclear reactor export.; The UAE-South Korea Comprehensive Economic Partnership Agreement (CEPA) was signed on 29 May 2024 and entered into force on 1 May 2026. Under the CEPA terms, customs tariffs will be progressively eliminated or reduced on over 90% of tariff lines (92.8% of UAE exports and 91.2% of South Korean exports) over a 10-year period. The agreement establishes rules-based frameworks to streamline customs procedures, reduce administrative non-tariff barriers, and enforce flexible Rules of Origin (RoOs) requiring at least 40% value-add content. Strategic provisions focus on joint investments and supply chain security across energy, natural resources, advanced manufacturing, digital services, healthcare, and green technology.; In October 2026, a high-level UAE delegation led by H.H. Sheikha Latifa bint Mohammed Al Maktoum visited South Korea to expand bilateral cooperation in healthcare, urban planning, advanced technology, and cultural investment.

== See also ==
- List of diplomatic missions in South Korea
- List of diplomatic missions of South Korea
- List of international trips made by presidents of South Korea
- Foreign relations of North Korea
- K-Silk Road Initiative
