= Algeria–South Korea relations =

- Algeria: South Korea

Algeria has an embassy in Seoul whilst Japan has an embassy in Algiers. The two countries officially established diplomatic relations on January 15, 1990.

== Overview ==
Since gaining independence from France in 1962, Algeria pursued a foreign policy centered on the Non-Aligned Movement, whereas South Korea belonged to the Western bloc during the Cold War; due to these differences in diplomatic approaches, official diplomatic relations between the two countries were established relatively late. During the Cold War, Algeria placed importance on solidarity with the Third World and non-aligned nations, while South Korea gradually expanded diplomatic relations with African countries.

== Foreign Relations & Strategic Partnership ==
In 2006, South Korea and Algeria established a bilateral "Strategic Partnership," making Algeria the first African nation to form such a diplomatic framework with South Korea. Relations between the two countries have focused primarily on energy trade, infrastructure development, and industrial technology cooperation.

== Economic Relations & Trade ==
Bilateral trade is largely structured around South Korea's energy imports and industrial exports. Algeria primarily exports refined petroleum, crude oil, and liquefied natural gas (LNG) to South Korea, while South Korean exports to Algeria include automobiles, heavy construction machinery, electronics, and pharmaceuticals.

To support cross-border investment and trade, the two nations signed a Double Taxation Avoidance Agreement in November 2001. Several major South Korean engineering and construction firms - including Daewoo E&C, Samsung Engineering, and Hyundai E&C - have executed major infrastructure projects in Algeria, such as power plant construction, new city developments, port modernizations, and oil refinery upgrades.

== Technical & Bilateral Cooperations ==
Beyond energy and heavy infrastructure, bilateral initiatives have expanded into agricultural technology, renewable energy development, public administration modernization, and vocational training programs. Joint business forums organized by the Korea International Trade Association (KITA) and Algerian commerce organizations continue to facilitate private sector investment between the two countries.

== See also ==
- Foreign relations of South Korea
- Foreign relations of Algeria
