= K-Silk Road Initiative =

South Korean foreign policy initiative for Central Asia

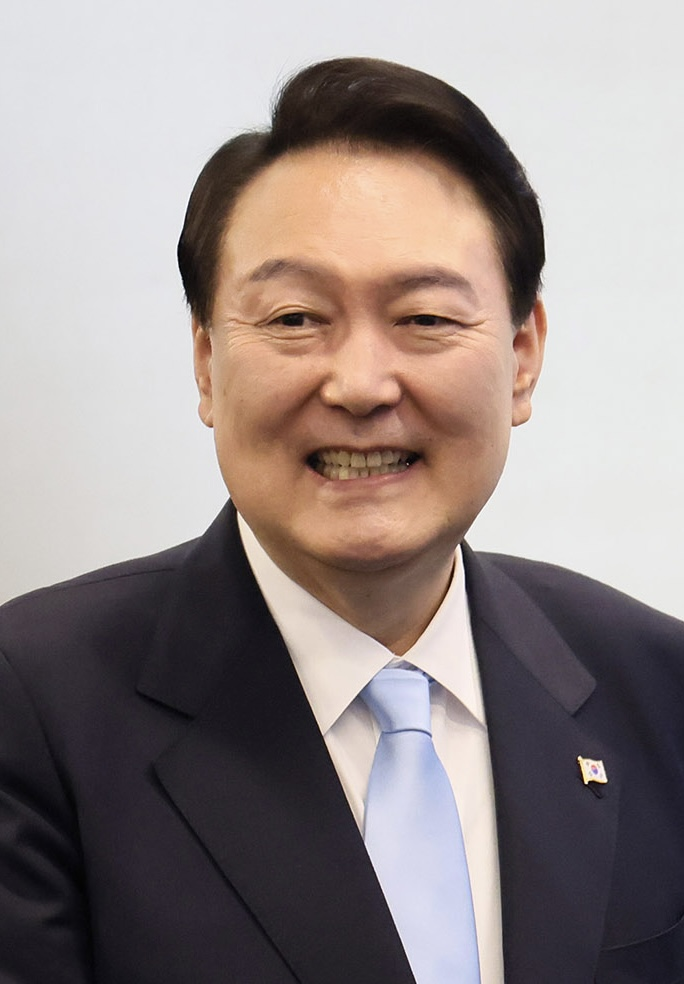
- President Yoon Suk Yeol, who launched the initiative in June 2024
- Type: Foreign policy and regional development initiative
- Announcement date: June 2024
- Target region: Central Asia
- Key countries: South Korea, Kazakhstan, Uzbekistan, Turkmenistan, Tajikistan, Kyrgyzstan
- Key sectors: Energy, critical minerals, transportation, infrastructure, technology, AI, labour migration

The K-Silk Road Initiative (officially the Korea–Central Asia K-Silk Road Cooperation Strategy) is a foreign policy initiative introduced by South Korea in June 2024 to expand political, economic, and industrial cooperation with five Central Asian nations: Kazakhstan, Uzbekistan, Turkmenistan, Tajikistan, and Kyrgyzstan. The initiative was announced by President Yoon Suk Yeol during a state tour of Turkmenistan, Kazakhstan, and Uzbekistan in June 2024.

The strategy aims to secure critical mineral supply chains—including lithium, uranium, tungsten, and rare metals—for South Korea's semiconductor and battery industries, while expanding infrastructure exports and energy-sector partnerships. The initiative is driven by South Korea's need to secure access to minerals that its resource-poor country's flagship companies need to keep producing advanced batteries and semiconductors, and to reduce reliance on China for critical materials.

It is South Korea's first comprehensive regional policy framework specifically designed for Central Asia and represents the country's third major regional initiative, following its Indo-Pacific Strategy and Korea-ASEAN Solidarity Initiative.

== Background ==
Diplomatic relations between South Korea and the Central Asian republics were established in the early 1990s following the dissolution of the Soviet Union. Engagement was historically driven by economic pragmatism, beginning with President Chun Doo-hwan's Nordpolitik doctrine and continuing through President Park Geun-hye's Eurasia Initiative and President Moon Jae-in's New Northern Policy.

In June 2024, President Yoon Suk Yeol embarked on a weeklong state visit to Turkmenistan, Kazakhstan, and Uzbekistan, accompanied by a business delegation of over 60 Korean companies. During this trip, he announced the launch of the K-Silk Road Initiative, describing it as a framework to link South Korea's technological capabilities with Central Asia's resources and development potential.

The initiative was positioned alongside existing regional frameworks such as China's Belt and Road Initiative. According to a senior official at the presidential office, "Global powerhouses such as the U.S. and China are striving to enhance their ties with the region. However, there are concerns that these countries... are subject to a new form of imperialism. Due to this, Korea's approach is being welcomed by these countries."

== Strategic pillars ==
=== Critical minerals and energy security ===
Central Asia holds substantial reserves of natural gas and critical raw materials. Under the initiative, South Korea has focused on systematising supply chains for critical minerals vital to its high-tech industry, including lithium, tungsten, chrome, uranium, and rare metals. The push for resource deals was central to President Yoon's visit, as South Korea seeks to diversify its supply chains and reduce dependence on China.

Following President Yoon's summit with Kazakh President Kassym-Jomart Tokayev, the two countries signed a memorandum of understanding on critical minerals supply chains, allowing South Korean companies to participate in exploration for lithium, chrome, uranium, and rare earth development. Media also reported the signing of approximately 35 agreements related to lithium exploration, commercialization, and supply chain development.

In August 2026, South Korean Deputy Prime Minister Koo Yun Cheol and Uzbek Deputy Prime Minister Jamshid Khodjaev met in Seoul and agreed to further develop cooperation "across the entire critical minerals supply chain, from exploration to processing and utilization."

=== Transportation and infrastructure ===
The initiative emphasises exporting South Korean infrastructure technology. In June 2024, Hyundai Rotem secured a US$195.7 million contract with Uzbekistan Railways to export six KTX-Eum (Class 150000) high-speed trains for the Tashkent–Urgench–Khiva route, marking South Korea's first international export of domestic high-speed rail technology.

In May 2026, Hyundai Rotem began commercial operations for the trains on the 1,020-kilometre route between Tashkent and Khiva, halving travel time to seven hours. The trains, adapted for extreme heat and desert environments, have a maximum speed of 250 km/h and accommodate up to 389 passengers.

=== Technology, AI, and human capital ===
The strategy promotes digital infrastructure deployment, including 5G communications, smart city technologies, and artificial intelligence. In August 2026, South Korea and Uzbekistan agreed to pursue the application of the "K-AI Package"—an initiative designed to integrate sector-specific AI solutions, AI data centers, and renewable energy generation with infrastructure projects financed through the Economic Development Cooperation Fund (EDCF).

Agreements were also established to build joint academic campuses, such as a KAIST branch in Uzbekistan, and joint artificial intelligence research centres between South Korean and Kazakh universities.

=== Official Development Assistance (ODA) and investment ===
The initiative includes targeted increases in concessional financing and grants to modernise Central Asia's social, environmental, and infrastructure sectors. In August 2026, the two countries held a Korea-Uzbekistan Business Roundtable, with representatives from around 30 Korean and Uzbek companies, to explore investment opportunities and discuss policy financing instruments, including the EDCF and export financing.

=== Cooperation with Tajikistan ===
In August 2026, South Korean Vice Minister Moon Shin-hak met with Tajik First Deputy Minister Isojon Qurbonzoda in Seoul to discuss economic cooperation projects ahead of the September 2026 summit. The two sides agreed to work towards establishing a regular C5+Korea Industry Ministers' Meeting and discussed signing a memorandum of understanding on industrial cooperation. They also held the inaugural Korea-Tajikistan Minerals Forum, focusing on Tajikistan's gold, silver, and antimony resources, and exploring joint exploration and investment opportunities.

== Institutional framework ==
=== Korea–Central Asia Cooperation Forum ===
The initiative is anchored by the regular Korea–Central Asia Cooperation Forum, which has operated at the ministerial level since 2007.

=== First Korea–Central Asia Summit (September 2026) ===
During the June 2024 announcement, President Yoon announced plans to host the first leader-level Korea–Central Asia Summit in 2025. The summit was subsequently scheduled for 16–17 September 2026 in Seoul.

The inaugural summit will bring together the leaders of all five Central Asian republics—Kazakhstan, Kyrgyzstan, Tajikistan, Turkmenistan, and Uzbekistan—alongside South Korea's president. Turkmen President Serdar Berdimuhamedov is expected to make his first visit to South Korea for the summit.

Preparatory meetings have been held in 2026, including a deputy ministers' meeting led by South Korean Deputy Foreign Minister Chung Eui-hye with vice foreign ministers from all five Central Asian nations. In August 2026, a high-level meeting between South Korean Deputy Prime Minister Koo Yun Cheol and Uzbek Deputy Prime Minister Jamshid Khodjaev was held to further develop bilateral cooperation projects ahead of the summit.

According to the Turkmenistan government news portal, the summit is expected to produce a final document—the "Seoul Declaration"—and will be accompanied by a large-scale business forum featuring major Korean conglomerates such as Hyundai, Samsung, POSCO, LG, and SK.

== Analysis ==
International media have framed the initiative as part of South Korea's broader effort to position itself as a significant partner in Central Asia, comparable to the engagement of other major powers. The initiative has been described as a strategic move to diversify supply chains and reduce dependence on China for critical minerals essential to South Korea's semiconductor and battery industries.

Some analysts have offered a more cautious assessment, noting that President Yoon's June 2024 visit did not produce immediate, concrete outcomes, and that further diplomatic work is needed to establish lasting agreements.

South Korean officials have framed the initiative as distinct from the approaches of other major powers, stating that Central Asian countries welcome Korea's engagement because they do not feel pressured or subject to what has been described as a new form of imperialism in their dealings with Seoul.

== See also ==
- Foreign relations of South Korea
- Belt and Road Initiative
