= Serbia–South Korea relations =

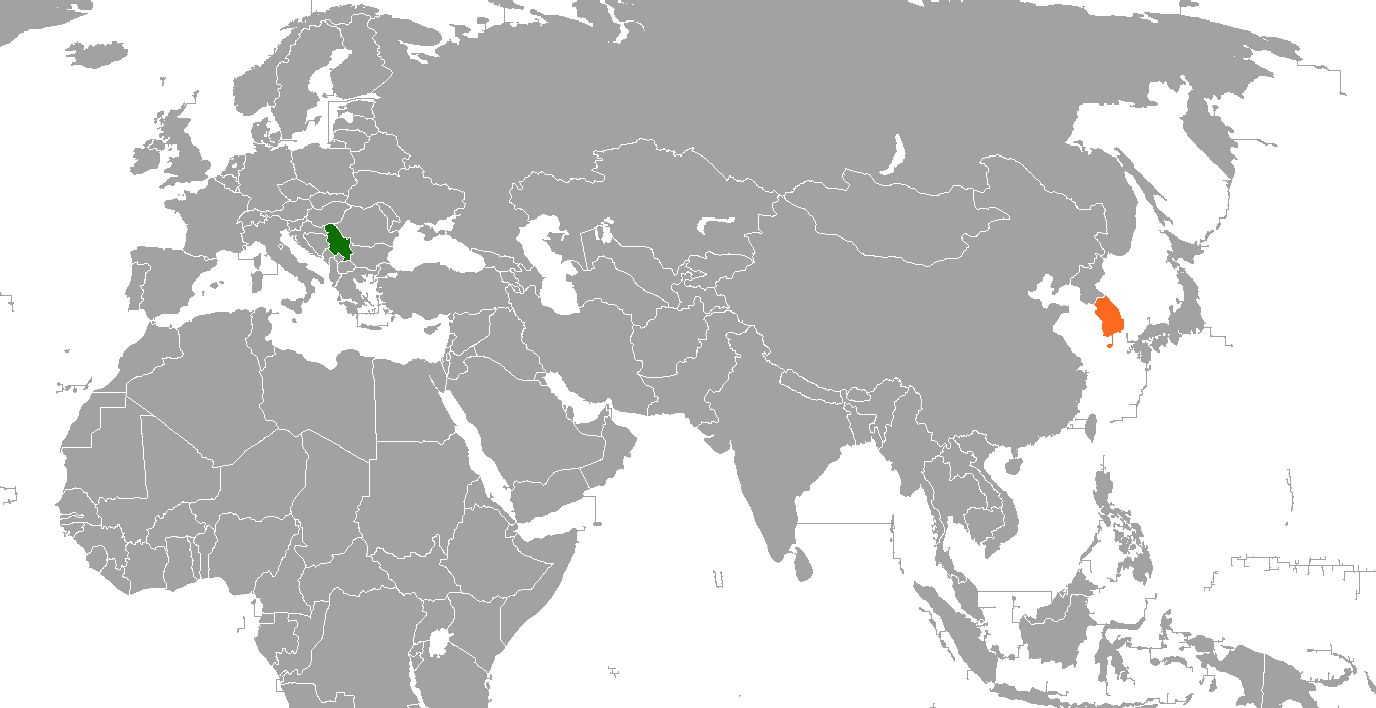
- Serbia: South Korea

Serbia and South Korea maintain diplomatic relations established between the SFR Yugoslavia and South Korea in 1989. From 1989 to 2006, South Korea maintained relations with the Socialist Federal Republic of Yugoslavia (SFRY) and the Federal Republic of Yugoslavia (FRY) (later Serbia and Montenegro), of which Serbia is considered shared (SFRY) or sole (FRY) legal successor.

== History ==
South Korea established formal diplomatic relations with Yugoslavia in 1989. Both countries opened resident embassies in 1990.

While the Yugoslav wars raged, the South Korean embassy withdrew from Serbia in 1993. Serbia also withdrew from South Korea in 1999 and the Serbian embassy in Tokyo, Japan, held additional post of an embassy to South Korea.

South Korea reopened embassy in Serbia in 2002. Serbia also reopened their embassy in South Korea the same month. The same year, KOTRA (Korea Trade Promotion Corporation) opened trade building in Belgrade. The Serbian Ministry of Trade & Industry and Korea International Trade Association (KITA) concluded a cooperation agreement in 2005. South Korea and Serbia made an agreement on amity in 2006.

== Economic relations ==
Trade between two countries amounted to $686 million in 2023; Korean merchandise export to Serbia were about $362 million; Serbian exports were standing at $324 million.

South Korean companies present in Serbia are mainly companies specialized in manufacturing automotive parts: Johnson Electric (plant in Niš), Yura (plants in Leskovac and Rača), Essex (plant in Zrenjanin), and Kyungshin Cable (plant in Smederevska Palanka).

== Resident diplomatic missions ==
- Serbia has an embassy in Seoul.
- South Korea has an embassy in Belgrade.

== See also ==
- Foreign relations of Serbia
- Foreign relations of South Korea
- North Korea–Serbia relations
