= Ghana–South Korea relations =

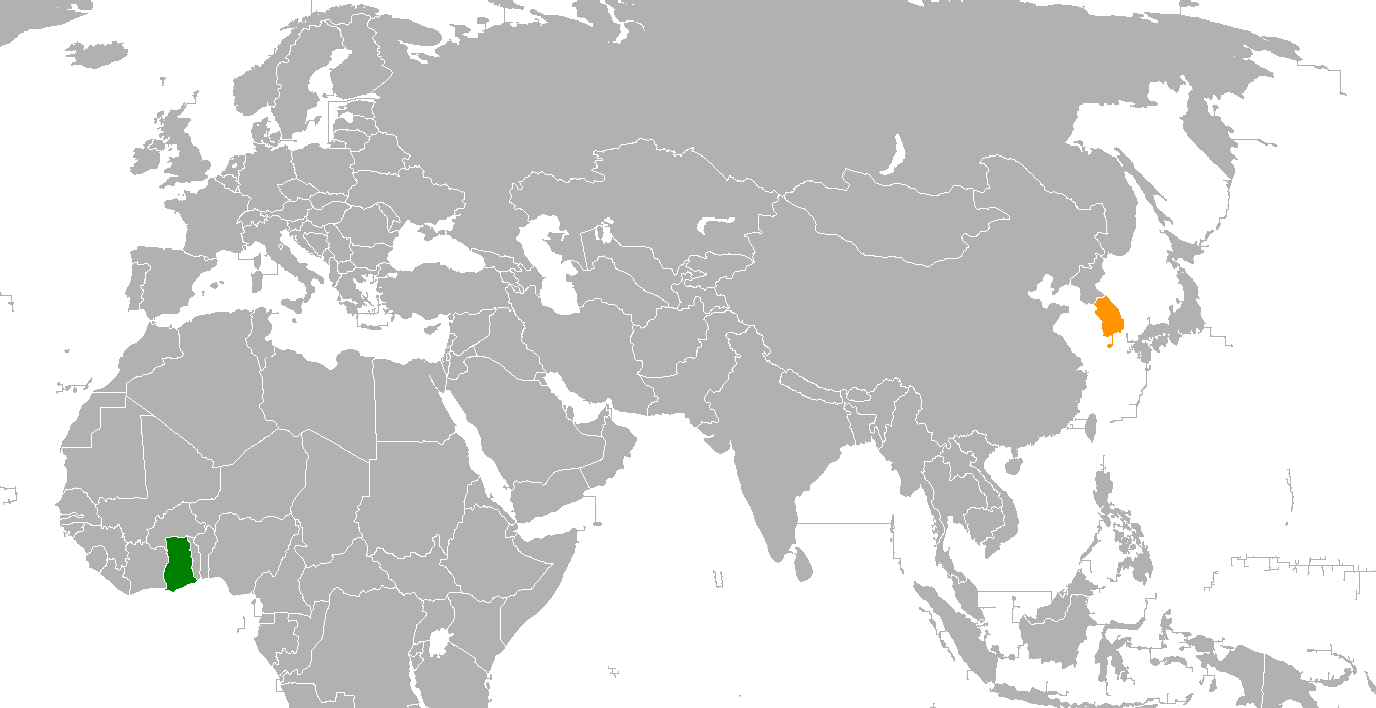
- Ghana: South Korea

Diplomatic mission
- Ghana Embassy, South Korea: Embassy of South Korea, Accra

Ghana–South Korea relations are the bilateral relations between Ghana and South Korea. Ghana has an embassy in Seoul. South Korea has an embassy in Accra.

== Economic relations ==
Comparatively, in 1960, Ghana had the same or a similar GDP per capita as South Korea. However, in 2017, Ghana had a GDP per capita of $1,641.487, while South Korea had a GDP per capita of $29,742.839. This is about ten times the GDP of Ghana per capita.

Ghana's top product exported to South Korea is cocoa beans, estimated at $11.5 million in 2020. Ghana's total exports to South Korea in 2020 were estimated at $34 million. Other commodities exported from Ghana to South Korea are scrap copper, valued at $8.85 million in 2020, and industrial fatty acids, oils, and alcohols, valued at $6.56 million. On the other hand, South Korea's exports to Ghana in 2020 were estimated at $225 million. This is approximately seven times higher than Ghana's exports to South Korea. South Korea's top two commodities exported to Ghana were cars (estimated at $24.8 million) and delivery trucks (estimated at $15.8 million).

== See also ==
- Foreign relations of Ghana
- Foreign relations of South Korea
