= Italy–South Korea relations =

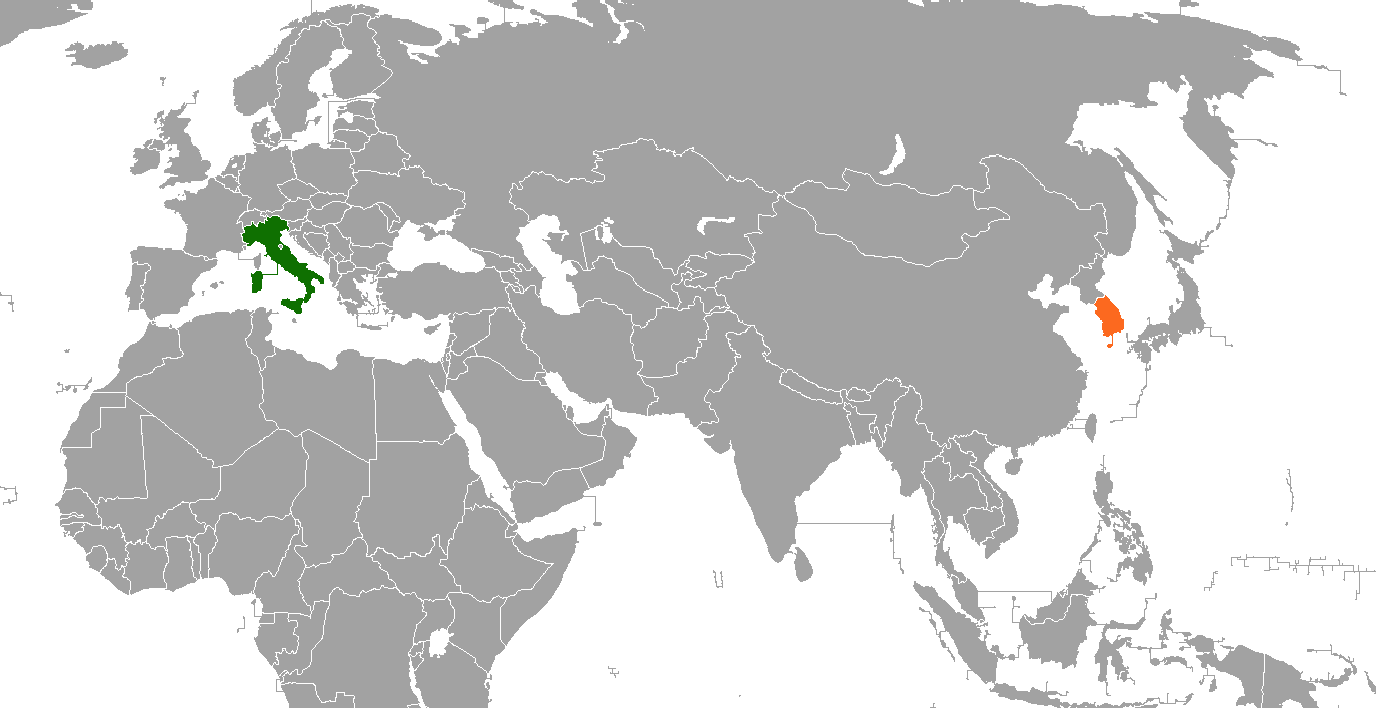
- Italy: South Korea

Italy–South Korea relations are foreign relations between Italy and South Korea. Both countries established diplomatic relations on November 24, 1956.

Italy has an embassy in Seoul. South Korea has an embassy in Rome.

== Trade ==
| | 2006 | 2022 |
|---|---|---|
| South Korea to Italy | $4.3B | $5.87B |
| Italy to South Korea | $2.9B | $7.44B |

Trade is sizable between the two nations, according to 2006 figures:

- From Korea to Italy: US$4,300,000,000 (Wireless Communication Devices, Automobile, Ships)
- From Italy to Korea: US$2,900,000,000 (Clothes, Automobile Parts, Chemical Products)

== Current status ==
Italian President Sergio Mattarella visited South Korea in November 2023.

"We have laid a solid foundation for strengthening and strengthening bilateral industrial cooperation in key areas such as semiconductors, core raw materials, advanced automobile manufacturing, new green energy technologies, and space...Our two countries will cooperate in science and technology in areas strategic to our companies. We will cooperate bilaterally and multilaterally, strengthening ties between industries and regularly exchanging views to further develop common interests."

— Italian Business Minister Adolfo Urso

== Cultural exchange ==
In February 2024, a photo exhibition was held at the National Museum of Korean Contemporary History in Seoul to commemorate the 140th anniversary of diplomatic relations.

In April 2024, South Korea held a special exhibition titled "Every Island is a Mountain" in Venice, Italy. It was held to celebrate the 30th anniversary of the establishment of the South Korean Pavilion in the Venice Biennale.

== Resident diplomatic missions ==
- Italy has an embassy in Seoul.
- South Korea has an embassy in Rome and a consulate in Milan.

== See also ==
- Foreign relations of Italy
- Foreign relations of South Korea
- Indo-Pacific Strategy of South Korea
