= Maldives–South Korea relations =

Bilateral relations of the Maldives and South Korea

- Maldives: South Korea

Envoy
- Ambassador Hassan Sobir: Ambassador Miyon Lee

Maldives–South Korea relations are the bilateral relations between the Republic of Maldives and the Republic of Korea.

== History ==
Relations between South Korea and the Maldives were established on 30 November 1967. The first high-level visit between the two countries occurred in October 1984, when Maldives president Maumoon Abdul Gayoom visited South Korea. The Ministry of Communications of South Korea issued a commemorative stamp for the occasion. Korea was among many nations to give humanitarianism to the Maldives after the 2004 Indian Ocean Earthquake with US$3,000,000 during 2005–2007. In November 2022, to celebrate 55 years of bilateral relations, a Maldives-Korea festival was held in Hulhumalé, with officials from both countries attending. In March 2023, the two countries signed a memorandum of understanding in the tourism sector, exchanging best practices on tourism planning and research.

== Ambassadors ==
=== Maldives ===
Hassan Sobir is the non-resident Ambassador of the Republic of Maldives to the Republic of Korea and presented his credentials to South Korean President Yoon Suk Yeol on 20 July 2023.

=== South Korea ===
Miyon Lee is the non-resident Ambassador of the Republic of Korea to the Republic of Maldives and presented her Letter of credence to Maldivian President Mohamed Muizzu.
