= Holy See–South Korea relations =

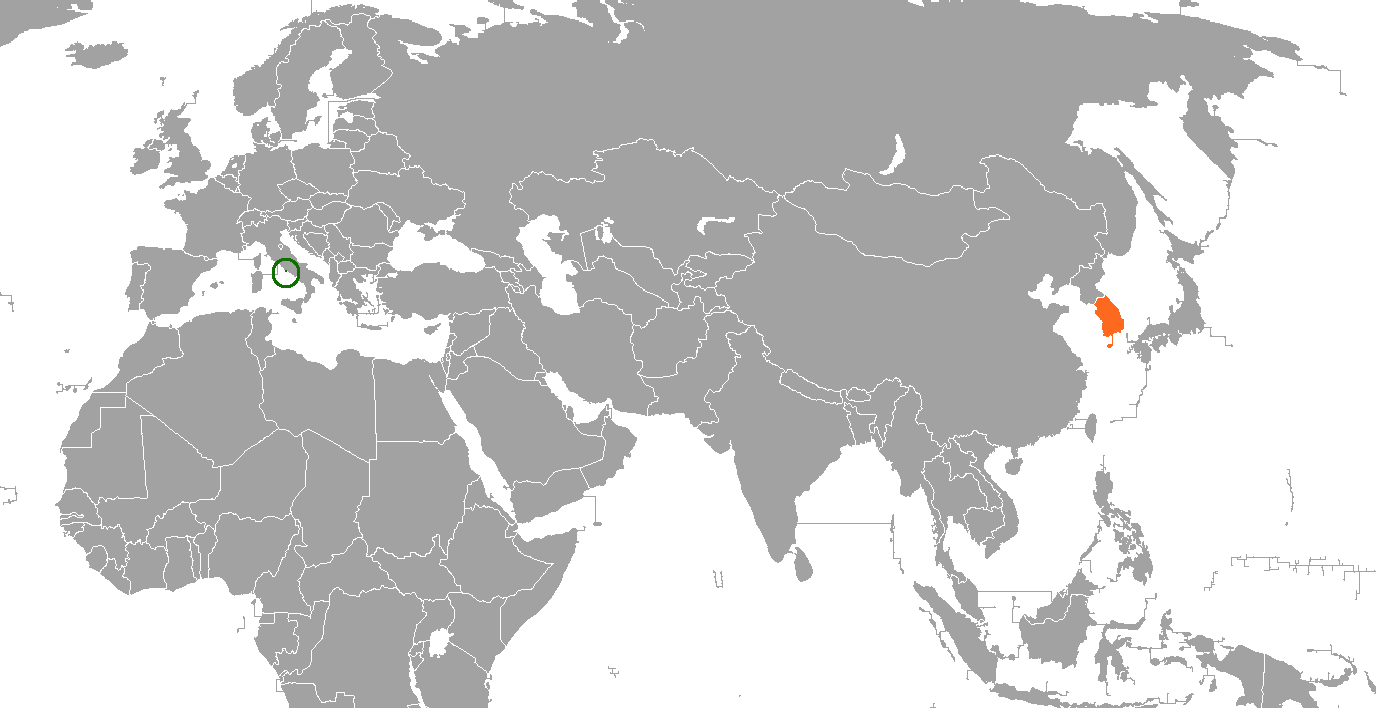
- Holy See: South Korea

Holy See–South Korea relations are the relations between the Holy See and the Republic of Korea. The Catholic Church in South Korea is the fastest growing Church in East Asia. According to statistics, as of December 31, 2017, the number of Catholics in Korea was 5,813,770. It amounted to 11.0% of the total population of South Korea (52 million). The total number of Catholics in Korea has slightly and consistently been increasing since the 1950s.

== History ==
Historical ties between the Vatican and South Korea can be traced back to 1946 when 1947 when Bishop Patrick Byrne served as an Apostolic Visitor to Korea from 1947 onward. The South Korean government sent a delegation to the Paris conference in 1948 to be recognized as the only government of the Korean Peninsula. At that time, the Holy See and the Apostolic Nuncio in Paris (then Angelo Roncalli, later Pope John XXIII) greatly helped the South Korean delegation to obtain recognition from many delegations of Catholic countries.

In 1980, President Chun Doo-hwan's military regime accused pro-democracy activist Kim Dae-jung of inciting the Gwangju uprising; a military tribunal sentenced Kim to death. In the subsequent week, Pope John Paul II wrote to Chun requesting clemency for Kim (a Catholic) on humanitarian grounds. Although initially rejecting his request, Chun commuted his sentence the following month. Kim would later be elected president; the first opposition candidate to win in Korean history.

In 2021, President Moon Jae-in encouraged Pope Francis to visit North Korea as a way to further the dialogue between the two countries and the United States. Francis never visited North Korea. It is unclear if such dialogue will continue, as former President Yoon Suk-yeol was highly critical of Moon's pro-reconciliation policies.

== State visits ==
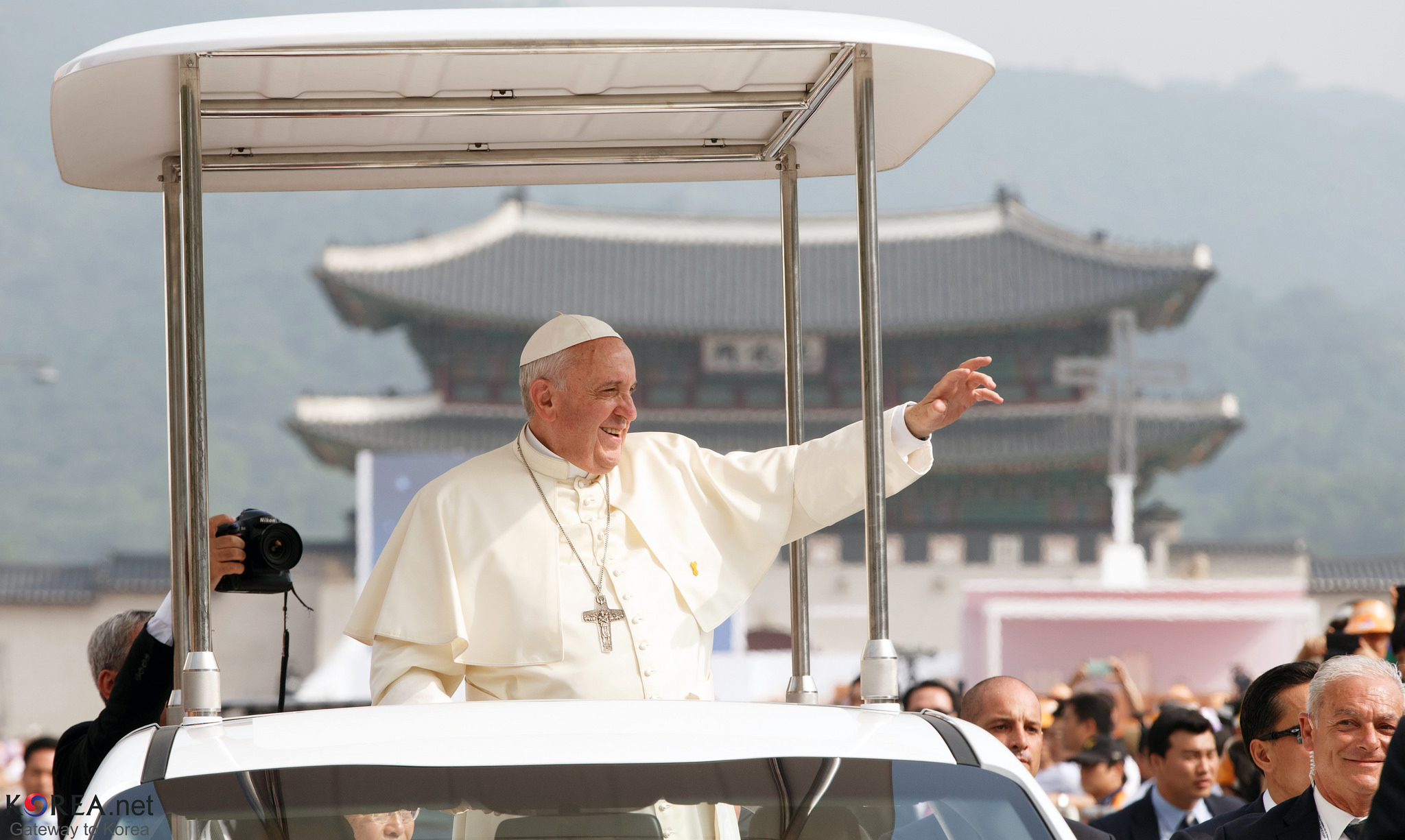
Pope Francis in South Korea

In 1984, Pope John Paul II visited South Korea for the first time to attend a ceremony commemorating 200th anniversary of Korean Catholicism, celebrating mass in the city of Gwangju, where a pro-democracy uprising took place four years prior. The pontiff made a second papal visit in 1989 to attend the 44th Eucharistic Congress. He wished to also visit North Korea, but the trip never materialized. Pope Francis also made a papal visit to South Korea in 2014 for the beatification of the 124 Korean martyrs and for the sixth Asian Youth Day.

Then Korean President Kim Dae-jung visited the Vatican in 2000, becoming the first Korean head of state to do so. He reportedly told John Paul "you saved my life, I am grateful." Presidents Roh Moo-hyun, Lee Myung-bak, Park Geun-hye and Moon Jae-in also made their visits to the city-state. During his visit, Moon, also a Catholic, declared that peace on the Korean peninsula was "certain".

== See also ==
- Catholic Church in South Korea
