= Nepal–South Korea relations =

- Nepal: South Korea

Nepal–South Korea relations are the foreign relations between Nepal and South Korea.

== History ==
Nepal–South Korea relations were officially established on 15 May 1974. The same year, South Korea opened its embassy in Kathmandu, and Nepal opened its embassy in Seoul in 2007.

In 2016, former Speaker of the National Assembly, Chung Ui-hwa visited Nepal, and Chairman of the National Assembly of Nepal, Ganesh Prasad Timilsina visited South Korea in 2019.

In 2004, it was reported that there were more than 4,600 Nepali migrant workers in South Korea. The same year, it was also reported that more than every year around 10,000 South Koreans visit Nepal; remarkably, 29,680 tourists visited Nepal in 2019.

South Korea provided US$1 million in humanitarian aid to Nepal following the April 2015 Nepal earthquake.
