= China–Japan–South Korea trilateral summit =

Annual diplomatic meeting

China–Japan–South Korea trilateral summit: 中日韩领导人会议 (Chinese); 日中韓首脳会談 (Japanese); 한중일 정상회의 (Korean)
Map of East Asia indicating China (red), Taiwan (pink), Japan (green), South Korea (blue), and North Korea (light blue)
Member states and key leaders:
- China: CCP General Secretary & President Xi Jinping (Note: The head of government of China is the Premier. The Chinese President is legally a ceremonial office, but the General Secretary of the Chinese Communist Party (de facto leader) has always held this office since 1993 except for the months of transition.); Premier Li Qiang
- Japan: Prime Minister Sanae Takaichi; Emperor Naruhito
- South Korea: President Lee Jae-myung; Prime Minister Kim Min-seok
- Participants: China, Japan, South Korea
- Founded: 2008

Key points

China–Japan–South Korea trilateral summit

Chinese name
- Simplified Chinese: 中日韩领导人会议
- Traditional Chinese: 中日韓領導人會議
Transcriptions
Standard Mandarin
- Hanyu Pinyin: Zhōngrìhán Lǐngdǎorén Huìyì

South Korean name
- Hangul: 한중일 정상회의
- Hanja: 韓中日頂上會議
Transcriptions
- Revised Romanization: Hanjungil Jeongsang Hoeui

Japanese name
- Kanji: 日中韓首脳会議
- Kana: にっちゅうかんしゅのうかいぎ
Transcriptions
- Romanization: Nitchūkan Shunō Kaigi

The China–Japan–South Korea trilateral summit is an annual summit meeting attended by China, Japan and South Korea, three major countries in East Asia and the world's second, fourth and 12th largest economies. The first summit was held during December 2008 in Fukuoka, Japan. The talks are focused on maintaining strong trilateral relations, the regional economy and disaster relief.

The summits were first proposed by South Korea in 2004, as a meeting outside the framework of the ASEAN Plus Three, with the three major economies of East Asia having a separate community forum. In November 2007 during the ASEAN Plus Three meeting, the leaders of China, Japan, and South Korea held their eighth meeting, and decided to strengthen political dialogue and consultations between the three countries, eventually deciding on an ad hoc meeting to be held in 2008.

In September 2011, the three countries launched the Trilateral Cooperation Secretariat in Seoul. The secretary-general is appointed on a two-year rotational basis in the order of Korea, Japan, and China. Each country other than that of the secretary-general nominates a deputy secretary-general respectively.

== Summits ==
=== Leader summits ===
Summit	Host Country	Participants			Host City	Date
Summit	Host Country	China Premier	Japan Prime Minister	South Korea President	Host City	Date
1st	Japan	Wen Jiabao	Tarō Asō	Lee Myung-bak	Dazaifu	13 December 2008
2nd	China	Wen Jiabao	Yukio Hatoyama	Lee Myung-bak	Beijing	10 October 2009
3rd	South Korea	Wen Jiabao	Yukio Hatoyama	Lee Myung-bak	Jeju	29 May 2010
4th	Japan	Wen Jiabao	Naoto Kan	Lee Myung-bak	Fukushima & Tokyo	21–22 May 2011
5th	China	Wen Jiabao	Yoshihiko Noda	Lee Myung-bak	Beijing	13–14 May 2012
6th	South Korea	Li Keqiang	Shinzō Abe	Park Geun-hye	Seoul	1 November 2015
7th	Japan	Li Keqiang	Shinzō Abe	Moon Jae-in	Tokyo	9 May 2018
8th	China	Li Keqiang	Shinzō Abe	Moon Jae-in	Chengdu	23–25 December 2019
9th	South Korea	Li Qiang	Fumio Kishida	Yoon Suk-yeol	Seoul	26–27 May 2024

=== Foreign Ministers' Meetings ===
Summit	Host Country	Participants			Host City	Date
Summit	Host Country	China	Japan	South Korea	Host City	Date
1st	South Korea	Yang Jiechi	Tarō Asō	Song Min-soon	Jeju	3 June 2007
2nd	Japan	Yang Jiechi	Masahiko Kōmura	Yu Myung-hwan	Tokyo	14 June 2008
3rd	China	Yang Jiechi	Katsuya Okada	Yu Myung-hwan	Shanghai	28 September 2009
4th	South Korea	Yang Jiechi	Katsuya Okada	Yu Myung-hwan	Gyeongju	15 May 2010
5th	Japan	Yang Jiechi	Takeaki Matsumoto	Kim Sung-hwan	Kyoto	19 March 2011
6th	China	Yang Jiechi	Kōichirō Genba	Kim Sung-hwan	Ningbo	8 April 2012
7th	South Korea	Wang Yi	Fumio Kishida	Yun Byung-se	Seoul	21 March 2015
8th	Japan	Wang Yi	Fumio Kishida	Yun Byung-se	Kurashiki	24 August 2016
9th	China	Wang Yi	Tarō Kōno	Kang Kyung-wha	Beijing	21 August 2019
Special	South Korea	Wang Yi	Toshimitsu Motegi	Kang Kyung-wha	(virtual)	20 March 2020
10th	South Korea	Wang Yi	Yōko Kamikawa	Park Jin	Busan	26 November 2023
11th	Japan	Wang Yi	Takeshi Iwaya	Cho Tae-Yul	Tokyo	22 March 2025

=== Finance Ministers and Central Bank Governors' Meetings ===
Summit	Host country	Host city	Date
1st	Brunei	Brunei	9 September 2000
2nd	China	Shanghai	11 May 2002
3rd	Indonesia	Bali	5 July 2003
4th	South Korea	Jeju	16 May 2004
5th	Turkey	Istanbul	4 May 2005
6th	India	Hyderabad	4 May 2006
7th	Japan	Tokyo	4 May 2007
8th	Spain	Madrid	4 May 2008
9th	Indonesia	Bali	3 May 2009
10th	Uzbekistan	Tashkent	2 May 2010
11th	Vietnam	Hanoi	4 May 2011
12th	Philippines	Manila	3 May 2012
13th	Australia	Cairns	19 September 2014
14th	Azerbaijan	Baku	3 May 2015
15th	Peru	Lima	8 October 2015
16th	Germany	Frankfurt	3 May 2016
17th	Japan	Yokohama	5 May 2017
18th	Philippines	Manila	4 May 2018
19th	Fiji	Nadi	2 May 2019
20th	(virtual)		18 September 2020
21st	(virtual)		3 May 2021
22nd	(virtual)		12 May 2022
23rd	South Korea	Incheon	2 May 2023
24th	Georgia	Tbilisi	3 May 2024

=== Economic and Trade Ministers' Meetings ===
Summit	Host country	Host city	Date
1st	Brunei	Brunei	13 September 2002
2nd	Cambodia	Phnom Penh	3 September 2003
3rd	Indonesia	Jakarta	4 September 2004
4th	Philippines	Manila	9 December 2006
5th	Singapore	Singapore	19 November 2007
6th	Thailand	Hua Hin	25 October 2009
7th	South Korea	Seoul	23 May 2010
8th	Japan	Tokyo	24 April 2011
9th	China	Beijing	12 May 2012
10th	South Korea	Seoul	30 October 2015
11th	Japan	Tokyo	26 October 2016
12th	China	Beijing	22 December 2019
13th	South Korea	Seoul	30 March 2025

=== Health Ministers' Meetings ===
Summit	Host country	Host city	Date
1st	South Korea	Seoul	8 April 2007
2nd	China	Beijing	2 November 2008
3rd	Japan	Tokyo	23 November 2009
4th	South Korea	Jeju	21 November 2010
5th	China	Qingdao	13 November 2011
6th	South Korea	Seoul	24 November 2013
7th	China	Beijing	23 November 2014
8th	Japan	Kyoto	29 November 2015
9th	South Korea	Busan	4 December 2016
10th	China	Jinan	12 November 2017
11th	Japan	Kumamoto	25 November 2018
12th	South Korea	Seoul	15 December 2019
Special	(virtual)		15 May 2020
13th	China	(virtual)	11 December 2020
14th	Japan	(virtual)	21 December 2021
15th	South Korea	(virtual)	16 December 2022
16th	China	Beijing	3 December 2023
17th	Japan	Tokyo	15 December 2024
18th	South Korea	Seoul	14 December 2025

=== Environment Ministers' Meetings ===
Summit	Host country	Host city	Date
1st	South Korea	Seoul	12 January 1999
2nd	China	Beijing	26 February 2000
3rd	Japan	Tokyo	7 April 2001
4th	South Korea	Seoul	20 April 2002
5th	China	Beijing	13 December 2003
6th	Japan	Tokyo	4 December 2004
7th	South Korea	Seoul	22 October 2005
8th	China	Beijing	2 December 2006
9th	Japan	Toyama	4 December 2007
10th	South Korea	Jeju	1 December 2008
11th	China	Beijing	13 June 2009
12th	Japan	Hokkaido	22 May 2010
13th	South Korea	Busan	28 April 2011
14th	China	Beijing	3 May 2012
15th	Japan	Kitakyushu	5 May 2013
16th	South Korea	Daegu	28 April 2014
17th	China	Shanghai	29 April 2015
18th	Japan	Shizuoka	27 April 2016
19th	South Korea	Suwon	25 August 2017
20th	China	Suzhou	24 June 2018
21st	Japan	Kitakyushu	23–24 November 2019
22nd	South Korea	(virtual)	7 December 2021
23rd	China	(virtual)	1 December 2022
24th	Japan	Nagoya	4 November 2023
25th	South Korea	Jeju	28-29 September 2024

=== Culture Ministers' Meetings ===
Summit	Host country	Host city	Date
1st	China	Nantong	19–21 September 2007
2nd	South Korea	Jeju	24–26 December 2008
3rd	Japan	Nara	18–20 January 2011
4th	China	Shanghai	5–6 May 2012
5th	South Korea	Gwangju	27–28 September 2013
6th	Japan	Yokohama	29–30 November 2014
7th	China	Qingdao	19–20 December 2015
8th	South Korea	Jeju	27–28 August 2016
9th	Japan	Kyoto	25–26 August 2017
10th	China	Harbin	29–31 August 2018
11th	South Korea	Incheon	29–31 August 2019
12th	Japan	(virtual)	30 August 2021
13th	China	(virtual)	26 August 2022
14th	South Korea	Jeonju	7–8 September 2023
15th	Japan	Kyoto	12 September 2024

== Meetings ==
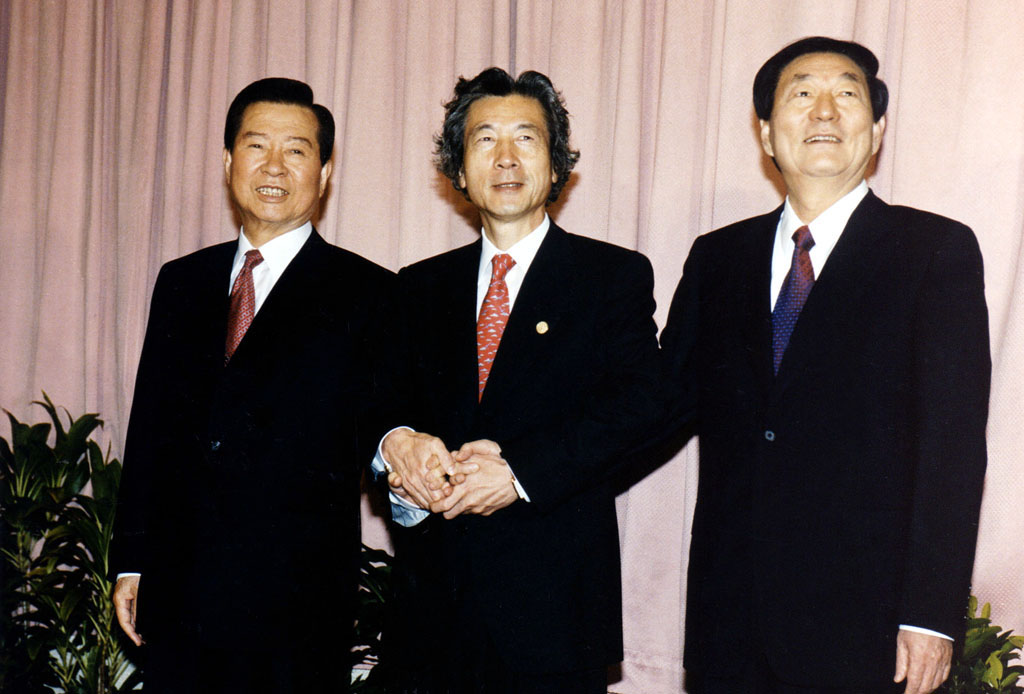
Korean President Kim Dae-jung, Japanese Prime Minister Junichiro Koizumi and Premier Zhu Rongji of the State Council of the People's Republic of China shaking hands at a meeting on November 5, 2001

Such a meeting was first proposed by the Republic of Korea in 2004 (another viewpoint that it should have begun in November 1999, when Zhu Rongji, the Premier of the State Council of the People's Republic of China, Keizo Obuchi, the Prime Minister of Japan, and Kim Dae-jung, the President of the Republic of Korea, held their first trilateral Leaders' Breakfast in the Philippines on the margins of the ASEAN-China Association meeting, thus setting the precedent for the trilateral Leaders to meet within the ASEAN (10+3) framework).

In November 2007, when the leaders of China, Japan and South Korea held their eighth meeting within the framework of ASEAN and China, Japan and South Korea (10+3), they decided to strengthen political dialog and consultation among the three countries and to hold occasional meetings among the leaders of the three countries, and at the meeting of the foreign ministers of the three countries held in June 2008 in Tokyo, but due to the sudden resignation of Japanese Prime Minister Yasuo Fukuda, the meeting was postponed to 13 December 2008.

=== 1st trilateral summit (2008) ===
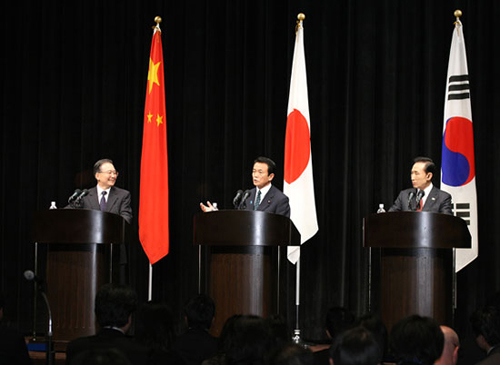
Premier Wen Jiabao, Prime Minister Taro Aso, and President Lee Myung-bak attends joint conference of PRC-Japan-ROK summit in 2008

The first separate meeting of the leaders of the three countries was held in Fukuoka, Japan. During the meeting, the "Joint Statement between the three partners" was signed and issued, which identified the direction and principles behind cooperation between China, Japan and South Korea. The conference adopted the "International Financial and Economic Issues Joint Statement", "Disaster Management of the Three Countries Joint Statement" and "Action plan to promote cooperation between China, Japan and South Korea".

One of the topics discussed focused on the improvement of future relations between the three countries, from strategic and long-term perspectives. Prior talks between the three countries have been hindered specifically by various territorial and historical disputes. Chinese premier Wen Jiabao stated that "China is willing to make joint efforts with Japan to continue to develop the strategic and mutually beneficial ties in a healthy and stable manner, to benefit the peoples of the two countries and other nations in the region as well." Japanese prime minister Tarō Asō also expressed that he believed the best manner in dealing with the economic crisis of 2008 was economic partnership. There is also speculation of a future regional Free trade area. Such co-operation would greatly benefit the three nations, which account for two thirds of total trade, 40% of total population and three quarters of the GDP of Asia (20% of global GDP), during the ongoing economic crisis.

=== 2nd trilateral summit (2009) ===
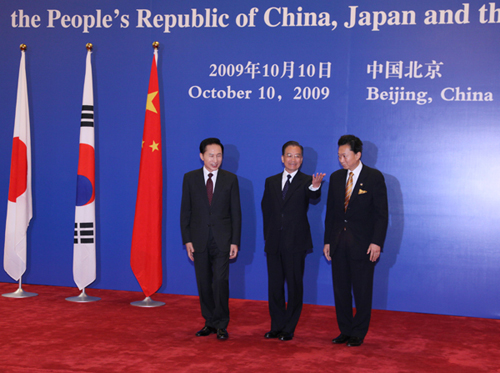
On 10 October 2009, Chinese Premier Wen Jiabao, Japanese Prime Minister Yukio Hatoyama, and South Korean President Lee Myung-bak attended the 2nd trilateral summit

The second summit was held in the Great Hall of the People in Beijing. Despite the worries of limitations that the summit has faced in 2008, this all changed in 2009, when Japan, China and Korea were forced to coordinate and cooperate more closely to manage the regional effects of the 2008 financial crisis.

In their joint statement on the crisis, the trio identified the need to cooperate on global issues (such as financial risk) and in global institutions, including at the G20. While a reaction to global events, this cooperation began to significantly affect the management of East Asia. Over the course of 2009, the three nations resolved their long running dispute over contributions (and thus voting weight) in the Chiang Mai Initiatives, the first major 'success' of the ASEAN Plus Three process. The three nations also worked together to push through a general capital increase at the Asian Development Bank to help it fight the effects of the 2008 financial crisis, a decision mandated by the G20 but about which the US appeared ambivalent.

=== 3rd trilateral summit (2010) ===
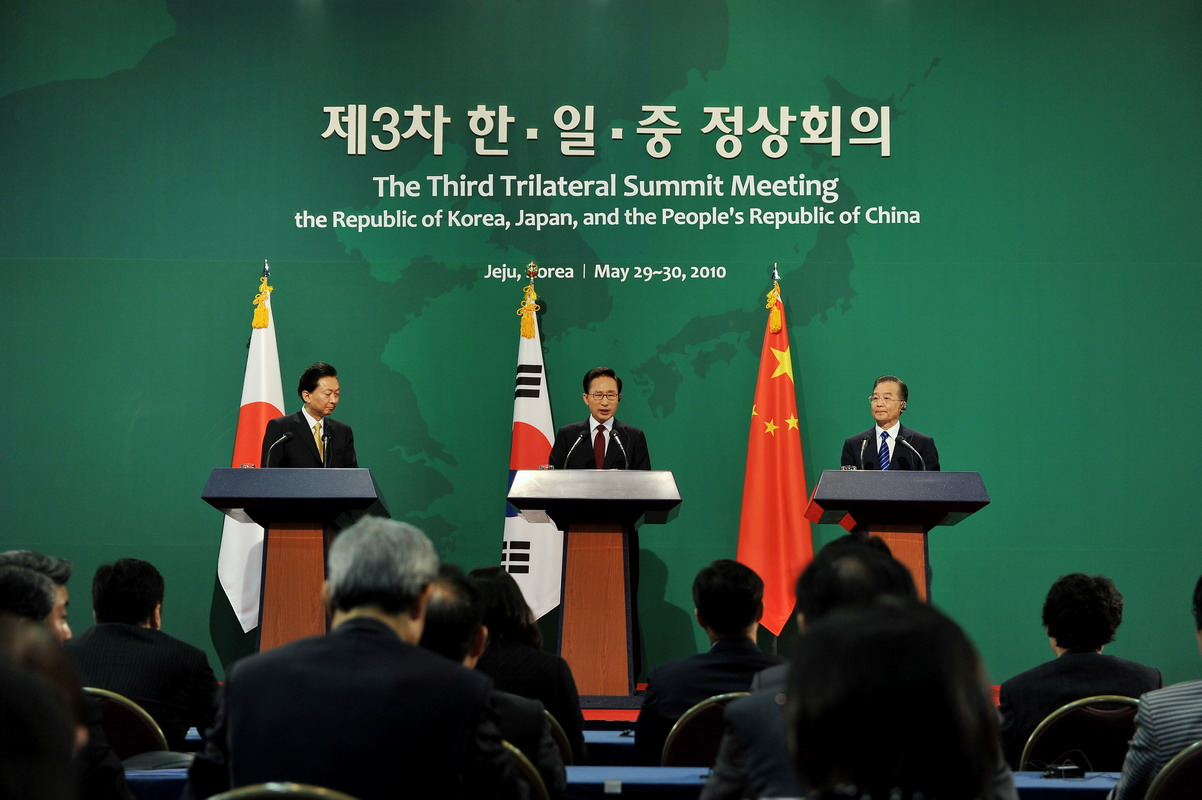
The 3rd trilateral summit was held in 2010

The third summit among these three countries was held in Jeju, Korea. The President of Korea, Lee Myung bak hosted the meeting and China's prime minister, Wen Jiabao, Japan's prime minister Yukio Hatoyama attended the meeting. One document called the 2020 Cooperation Prospect was released, which firstly emphasized that the three countries will face up to history and cooperate for the future development. Also, looking forward to the specific goals that should be achieved in the next ten years, this document stressed the importance to concentrate on the cooperation in different fields.

In the progress of institutionalizations and improvements of the partnership, the leaders decided to enhance the communication and strategic mutual trust. The leaders agreed to establish a secretariat in Korea in 2011 to confront the natural disaster, discuss the possibility to build up the 'defense dialogue mechanism', improve the policing cooperation and boost the communication among the government. In terms of sustainable development and common prosperity, the leaders said they would try to complete the survey of the Trilateral Free Trade Area before 2012; improve the trade volume; enhance trade facilitation and they restated that they would attach great importance to the customs cooperation; make efforts to the negotiation about investment agreement and offer necessary infrastructure for the improvement of the free flow of investment capital; enhance the coordination of the financial departments; improve the effectiveness of the multilateral Chiang mai initiate; reject all forms of trade protectionism; improve the cooperation in science and innovation; and strengthen the cooperation and consultation policies in the fields of industry, energy, the energy efficiency and resource.

=== 4th trilateral summit (2011) ===
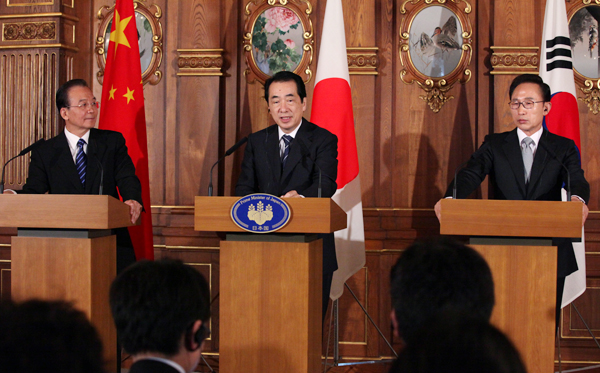
On 22 May 2011, Chinese Premier Wen Jiabao, Japanese Prime Minister Naoto Kan, and South Korean President Lee Myung-bak attend the 4th trilateral summit

Because the previous three summit meetings covered a wide range of world issues, they did not produce any concrete outcome. There was no agreement on North Korea's nuclear development or on the March and September 2010 incidents involving North Korea. Moreover, although the leaders of the three countries had agreed to set up a permanent secretariat headquartered in Seoul to facilitate trilateral cooperation, it has still not been implemented. The three leaders had also agreed to strengthen mutual understanding and trust, expand cooperation in trade, investment, finance, and environmental protection.

The fourth meeting was held in the wake of the nuclear accident at Fukushima and the natural disaster in Japan. Prime Minister Kan Naoto proposed to hold the summit in Fukushima to convey the message to the world that Fukushima has already become a safe place. The Japanese government hoped that if the heads of the three countries gather in the crisis-stricken city, radiation fears will be mitigated. However, due to logistic problems, the meeting could not be held in Fukushima and instead was held in Tokyo.

While Japan was accused of not providing its neighbours with accurate information when radioactive materials leaked at Fukushima, the summit led to agreement to establish an emergency notification system, enhance cooperation among experts, and share information in the event of emergencies.

=== 5th trilateral summit (2012) ===
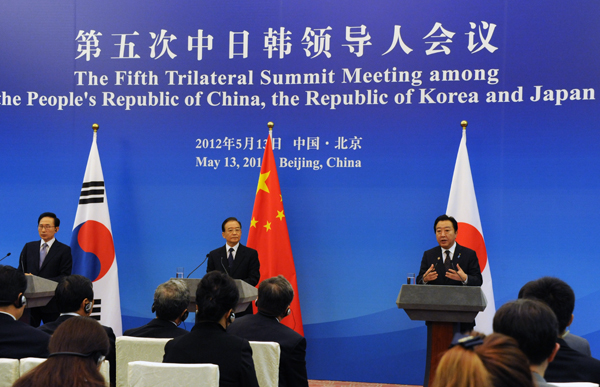
On 13 May 2012, Chinese Premier Wen Jiabao, Japanese Prime Minister Yoshihiko Noda, and South Korean President Lee Myung-bak attend the 5th trilateral summit

14 May 2012, Leaders from China, Japan, and South Korea concluded the Fifth Trilateral Summit Meeting and signed the Trilateral Agreement for the Promotion, Facilitation and Protection of Investment (hereinafter referred as the Trilateral Agreement) at a summit in Beijing. The Trilateral Agreement represents a stepping stone towards a three-way free trade pact to counter global economic turbulence and to boost economic growth in Asia.

According to a joint declaration, the three nations will further enhance the "future-oriented comprehensive cooperative partnership" to unleash vitality into the economic growth of the three countries, accelerate economic integration in East Asia, and facilitate economic recovery and growth in the world.

In the joint declaration, the three nations list directions and prioritization of future cooperation, which includes enhancing mutual political trust, deepening economic and trade cooperation, promoting sustainable development, expanding social, people-to-people and cultural exchanges, and strengthening communication and coordination in regional and international affairs.

Among all these proposals, the signing of the Trilateral Agreement and the decision to endorse the recommendation from the trade ministers to launch the trilateral FTA negotiations within this year are at the top of the priority list in deepening economic and trade cooperation.

=== 6th trilateral summit (2015) ===
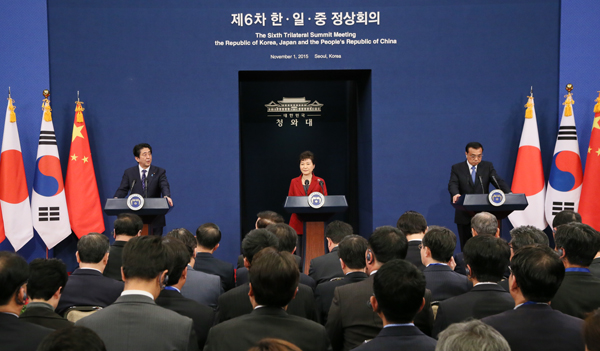
On 1 November 2015, the 6th China-Japan-South Korea Leaders' Meeting was held in Seoul, South Korea

The 6th trilateral summit was held on 1 November 2015 in Seoul, resuming the summit since 2012 due to varieties of disputes and issues ranging from World War II apologies to territorial disputes among the three nations. During the summit, Chinese Premier Li Keqiang, Japanese Prime Minister Shinzō Abe, and South Korean President Park Geun-hye agreed to meet annually in order to work towards deepening trade relations with the proposed trilateral free trade agreement. They also agreed to pursue the six-party talks over North Korea's nuclear weapons program.

Since 2016, relations between the People's Republic of China and South Korea have deteriorated over the deployment of the South Korean anti-missile system Terminal High Altitude Area Defense. In the same year, South Korean President Park Geun-hye was impeached and suspended from office over the Choi Soon-sil scandal. As a result, the China-Japan-South Korea Leaders' Meeting, which was originally scheduled to be held in early December 2016 in Japan, had to be postponed. The meeting was originally planned to be postponed to 2017 and still be held in Japan, but relations between China and South Korea have deteriorated sharply due to the continued festering of the Terminal High Altitude Area Defense affair. Japan's failure to satisfy the People's Republic of China on the history issue and other issues kept the meeting on the back burner, and the leaders of the three countries did not meet in 2016 or 2017.

=== 7th trilateral summit (2018) ===
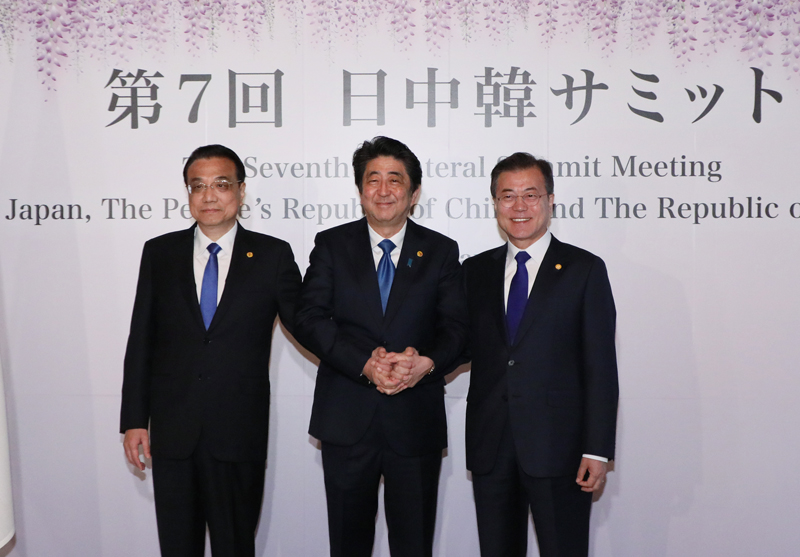
On 9 May 2018, the 7th trilateral summit was held in Japan

The 7th trilateral summit was held on 9 May 2018 in Tokyo, resuming the summit since 2015. Japanese Prime Minister Shinzo Abe, Premier of the State Council of the People's Republic of China Li Keqiang and South Korean President Moon Jae-in attended the meeting. During his visit to Japan, Li will also attend the 40th anniversary of the conclusion of the Treaty of Peace and Friendship between Japan and China and the "Sino-Japanese Governors' Forum".

=== 8th trilateral summit (2019) ===
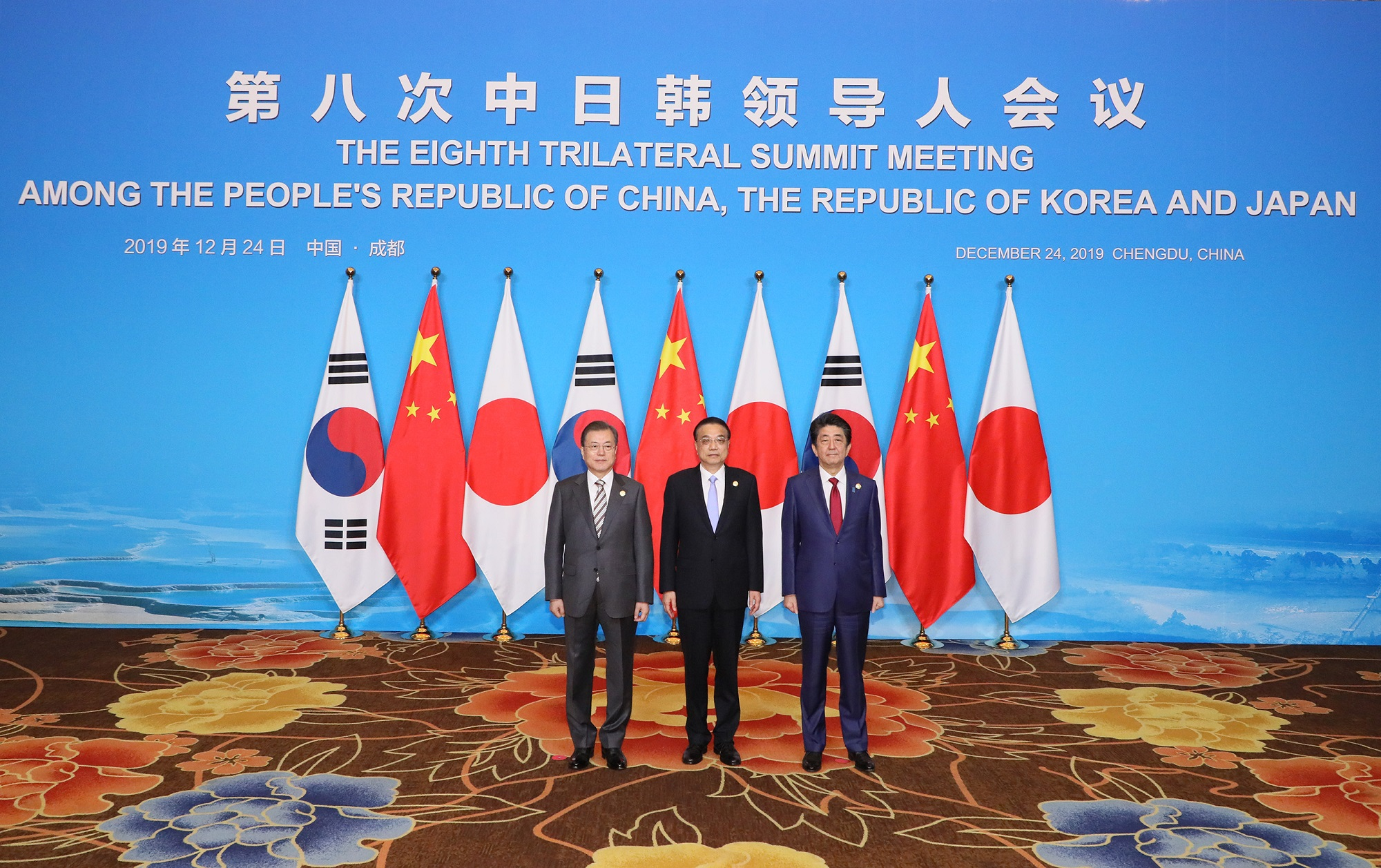
The 8th trilateral summit was held in Chengdu, Sichuan, China

On the morning of 24 December 2019, Premier of the State Council of the People's Republic of China Li Keqiang, South Korean President Moon Jae-in, and Japanese Prime Minister Shinzo Abe attended the 8th China-Japan-South Korea Leaders' Meeting in Chengdu, Sichuan Province, exchanging views on China-Japan-South Korea cooperation, as well as on regional and international issues. In the afternoon of 24 December, Li Keqiang, along with Moon and Abe, attended the Dufu Caotang Museum in Chengdu, Sichuan Province, to mark the China-Japan-South Korea Cooperation. On 25 December, Li and Abe held talks at Mount Qingcheng before visiting the Dujiangyan Water Conservancy Project. At the meeting, the "Outlook for the Next Ten Years of China-Japan-ROK Cooperation" and other outcome documents were also released.

The leaders of the three countries did not meet from 2020 to 2023. This was due to the impact of the COVID-19 pandemic as well as strained Korean–Japanese relations due to the judgment of the Supreme Court of Korea against Japanese companies for compensation in the case of former expelled laborers, with the Japanese government strongly opposing it.

=== 9th trilateral summit (2024) ===
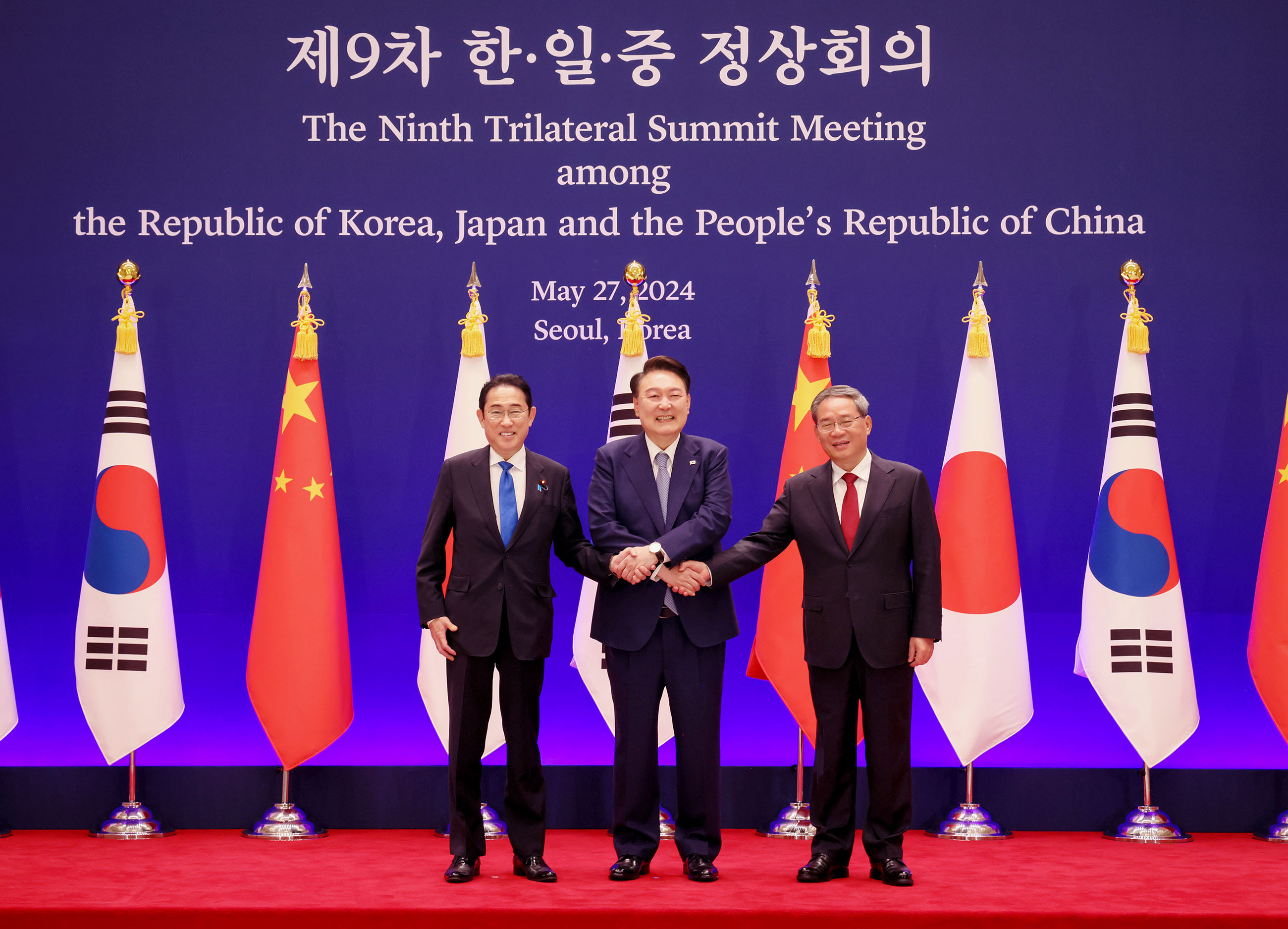
The 9th trilateral summit was held in South Korea

On 26–27 May 2024, the 9th China-Japan-ROK Leaders' Meeting was held in Seoul, South Korea. Chinese Premier Li Qiang, South Korean President Yoon Suk Yeol and Japanese Prime Minister Fumio Kishida attended the meeting. The three leaders' meeting was the first trilateral talks in more than four years. It comes at a time when South Korea and Japan have been trying to repair ties damaged by historical disputes while deepening their trilateral security partnership with the United States amid heightened Sino-U.S. rivalry. Li Qiang agreed with Yoon Suk Yeol to launch a diplomatic and security dialogue and resume free trade talks, while China and Japan agreed to hold a new round of bilateral high-level economic dialogue at an appropriate time. The three leaders also agreed to designate the year 2025 and 2026 as the China-Japan-South Korea Cultural Exchange Year.

After the meeting, the three leaders joined a business summit aimed at boosting trade between the countries. Some top industry leaders attended the summit.

== TCS secretaries-general ==
The Trilateral Cooperation Secretariat (TCS) is an international organization established with a vision to promote peace and common prosperity among China, Japan, and South Korea.

List of TCS secretaries-general:

- Shin Bong-kil (South Korea) (1 September 2011 – 31 August 2013)
  - Rui Matsukawa (Japan) & Mao Ning (China) (Deputies)
- Shigeo Iwatani (Japan) (1 September 2013 – 31 August 2015)
  - Chen Feng (China) & Lee Jong-heon (South Korea) (Deputies)
- Yang Houlan (China) (1 September 2015 – 31 August 2017)
  - Lee Jong-heon (South Korea) & Akima Umezawa (Japan) (Deputies)
- Lee Jong-heon (South Korea) (1 September 2017 – 31 August 2019)
  - Yamamoto Yasushi (Japan) & Han Mei (China) (Deputies)
- Hisashi Michigami (Japan) (1 September 2019 – 31 August 2021)
  - Jing Cao (China) & Kang Do-ho (South Korea) (Deputies)
- Ou Boqian (China) (1 September 2021 – 31 August 2023)
  - Bek Bum-hym (South Korea) & Sakata Natsuko (Japan) (Deputies)
- Lee Hee-sup (South Korea) (1 September 2023 – present)
  - Zushi Shuji (Japan) & Yan Liang (China) (Deputies)

== Countries data and comparison ==
Name	China	Japan	South Korea
Official name	People's Republic of China 中华人民共和国	Japan 日本	Republic of Korea 대한민국
Coat of arms			
Flag	China	Japan	South Korea
Population	1,404,237,200	125,930,000	51,780,579
Area	9,596,960 (Note: The area given is the official United Nations figure for the mainland and excludes Hong Kong, Macau and Taiwan. It also excludes the Trans-Karakoram Tract (5,800 km^{2} or 2,200 sq mi), Aksai Chin (37,244 km^{2} or 14,380 sq mi) and other territories in dispute with India. The total area of China is listed as 9,572,900 km^{2} (3,696,100 sq mi) by the Encyclopædia Britannica. For further information, see Territorial changes of the People's Republic of China.)	377,915	100,210 (Note: 2,231,555 km^{2} or 861,608 sq mi includes the territory controlled by North Korea.)
Population Density	146.3/sq mi	333.2/sq mi	516.7/sq mi
Government	Unitary communist state under a system of people's congress	Unitary parliamentary constitutional monarchy	Unitary presidential republic
Formation	2070 BC (First imperial dynasty); 10 October 1911 (Republic declared); 1 October 1949 (People's Republic proclaimed)	11 February 660 BC (National Foundation Day); 3 May 1947 (Current state form)	3 October 2333 BC (First Korean state); 15 August 1945 (Independence and division); 15 August 1948 (Republic declared)
Capital	Beijing – 16,446,857	Tokyo – 9,272,740	Seoul – 9,904,312
Largest City	Shanghai – 20,217,748	Tokyo – 9,272,740	Seoul – 9,904,312
Official language	Standard Chinese (de facto)	Japanese	Korean
Head of State	CCP General Secretary and President Xi Jinping (Chinese Communist Party; 2012–present)	Emperor Naruhito (2019–present)	President Lee Jae-myung (Democratic Party; 2025–present)
Head of Government	Premier Li Qiang (Chinese Communist Party; 2023–present)	Prime Minister Sanae Takaichi (Liberal Democratic Party; 2025–present)	President Lee Jae-myung (Democratic Party; 2025–present)
Currency	Renmin (¥) – RMB	Japanese yen (¥) – JPY	South Korean won (₩) – KRW
Human Development Index	0.788 high 75th	0.920 very high 24th	0.929 very high 19th

=== Demographics ===
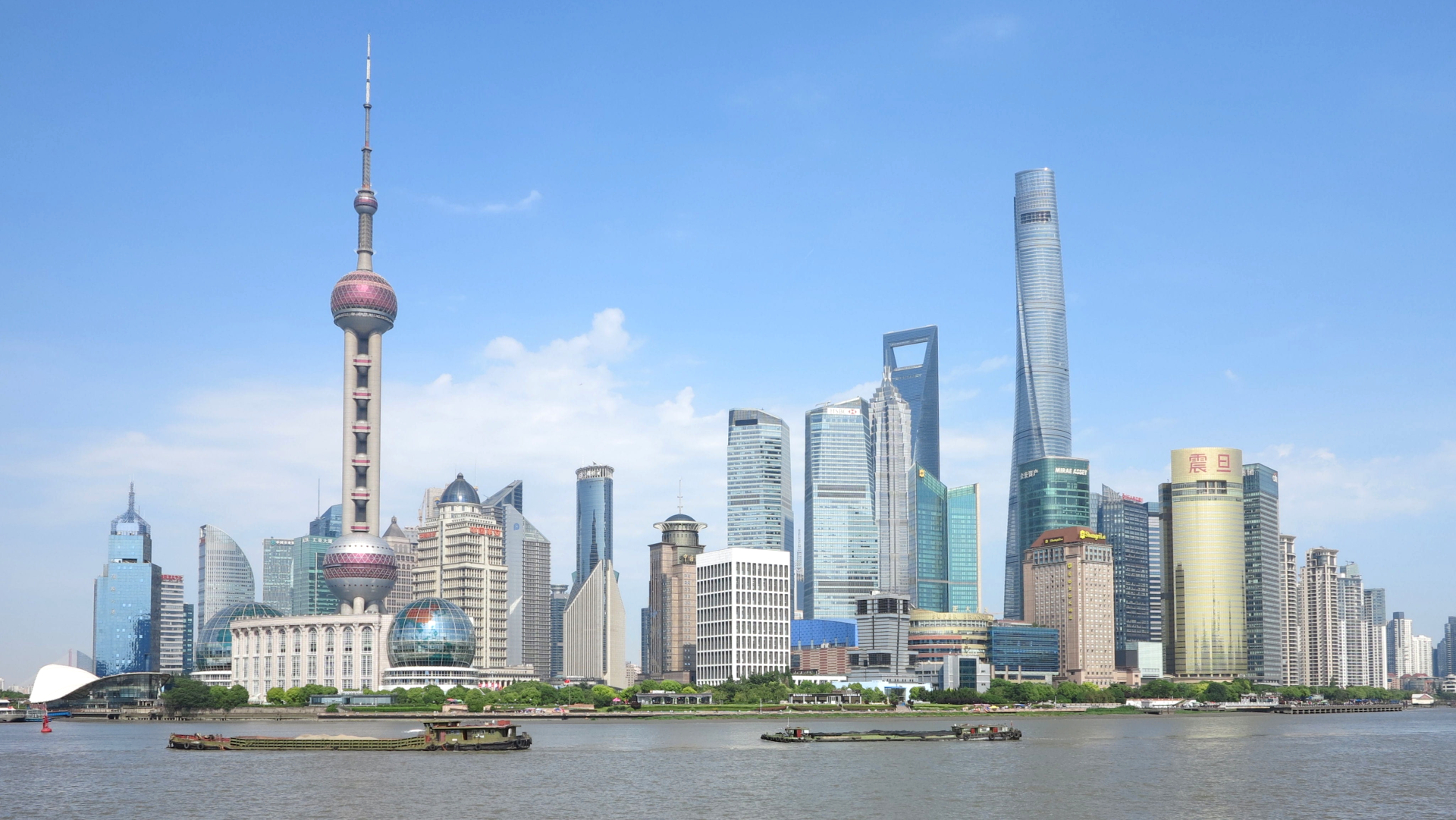
Pudong financial center of Shanghai.

Shinjuku financial center of Tokyo.

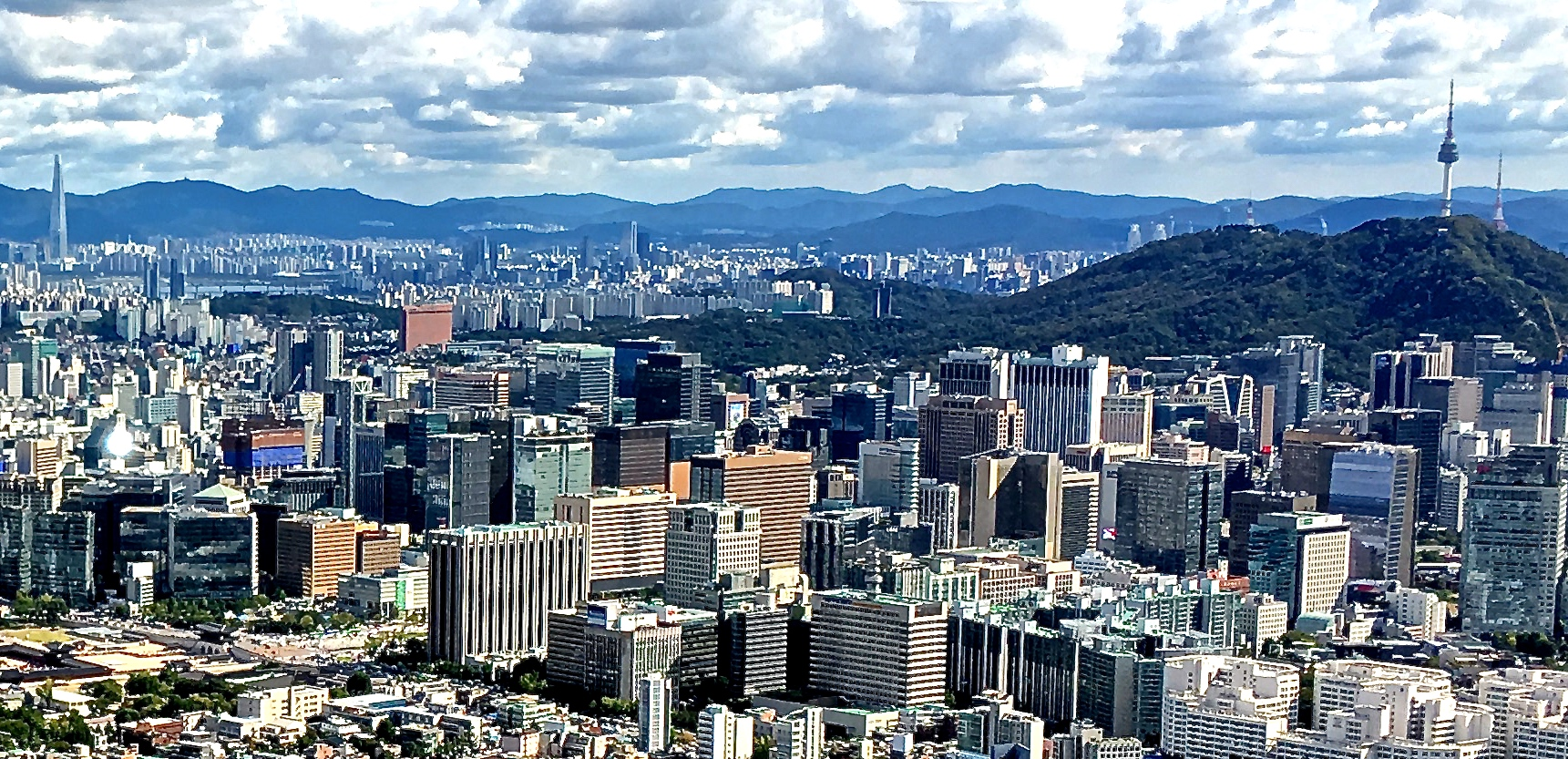
Jongno financial center of Seoul.

Largest municipals in China, Japan, & South Korea

China
Municipal	Urban population (2010 Census)
Shanghai	20,217,748
Beijing	16,446,857
Shenzhen	10,358,381
Guangzhou	9,702,144
Tianjin	9,562,255
Chongqing (Note: The municipality covers a large geographical area roughly the size of Austria, which includes several disjunct urban areas in addition to Chongqing proper. Due to its classification, the municipality of Chongqing, with a population of 32,054,159 in 2018, is the largest city proper in the world by population, though Chongqing is not the most populous urban area. University of Washington professor Kam Wing Chan argued that Chongqing's status is more akin to that of a province rather than a city.)	8,894,757
Wuhan	7,541,527
Hong Kong	7,336,585
Dongguan	7,271,322
Foshan	6,771,895

Japan
Municipal	Population (2015 Census)
Tokyo (Note: Since the abolition of Tokyo City in 1943, Tokyo has been designated as a "metropolis" and contains 23 special wards.)	13,491,000
Yokohama	3,724,844
Osaka	2,691,185
Nagoya	2,295,638
Sapporo	1,952,356
Fukuoka	1,538,681
Kobe	1,537,272
Kawasaki	1,475,213
Kyoto	1,475,183
Saitama	1,263,979

South Korea
Municipal	Population (2015 Census)
Seoul	9,904,312
Busan	3,448,737
Incheon	2,890,451
Daegu	2,466,052
Daejeon	1,538,394
Gwangju	1,502,881
Suwon	1,194,313
Ulsan	1,166,615
Changwon	1,059,241
Goyang	990,073

=== Military ===
Country	Active Military	Military Budget billions of USD (2024)	Military Budget % of GDP (2024)
China	2,183,000	314.0	1.7
Japan	247,160	55.3	1.4
South Korea	580,000	47.6	2.6

=== Economy ===
Country	Currency	GDP nominal millions of USD (2025)	GDP PPP millions of USD (2025)	GDP nominal per capita USD (2025)	GDP PPP per capita USD (2025)	Exports millions of USD (2024)	Imports millions of USD (2024)	International trade millions of USD (2024)
China	Chinese yuan (CNY; 圆; ￥)	19,398,577	41,015,824	13,806	29,191	3,792,950	3,219,343	7,220,456
Japan	Japanese yen (JPY; 円; ￥)	4,279,828	6,758,231	34,713	54,815	922,447	981,638	1,924,341
South Korea	South Korean won (KRW; 원; ￦)	1,858,572	3,363,419	35,962	65,080	835,148	752,670	1,616,983

=== Credit ratings ===
Country	Fitch	Moody's	S&P
China	A+	A1	A+
Japan	A	A1	A+
South Korea	AA-	Aa2	AA

=== Organization and groups ===
Country	G20	G8	P5	G4	UfC	OECD	SCO	BRICS	BRI	MIKTA	MNNA	APEC	EAS	APT	UN	WTO	IMF	WBG	ISA	IPU	Interpol
China	✓	✗	✓	✗	✗	✗	✓	✓	✓	✗	✗	✓	✓	✓	✓	✓	✓	✓	✓	✓	✓
Japan	✓	✓	✗	✓	✗	✓	✗	✗	✗	✗	✓	✓	✓	✓	✓	✓	✓	✓	✓	✓	✓
South Korea	✓	✗	✗	✗	✓	✓	✗	✗	✓	✓	✓	✓	✓	✓	✓	✓	✓	✓	✓	✓	✓

=== Airport traffic ===
Top busiest airports by passenger traffic (2019)

Country	Airport	Total passengers
China	Beijing Capital International Airport	100,011,000
Japan	Tokyo International Airport	85,505,054
South Korea	Incheon International Airport	71,169,516

Top busiest airports by international passenger traffic (2018)

Country	Airport	Total passengers
China	Hong Kong International Airport	74,360,976
South Korea	Incheon International Airport	67,676,147
Japan	Narita International Airport	35,300,076

Top busiest airports by cargo traffic (2019)

Country	Airport	Total passengers
China	Hong Kong International Airport	4,809,485
South Korea	Incheon International Airport	2,764,369
Japan	Narita International Airport	2,104,063

Top busiest city airport systems by passenger traffic (2018)

Country	Airport	Total passengers
Japan	Tokyo: Narita, Haneda, & Chōfu	130,589,705
China	Shanghai: Pudong & Hongqiao	117,636,331
South Korea	Seoul: Incheon & Gimpo	92,953,372

== See also ==
- Economy of China / Japan / South Korea
- China–Japan–South Korea relations
- Disputes between Japan and Korea
- Senkaku Islands dispute
- Socotra Rock dispute
