= Minister of Foreign Affairs (South Korea) =

South Korean government position

- Emblem of the Government of Republic of Korea

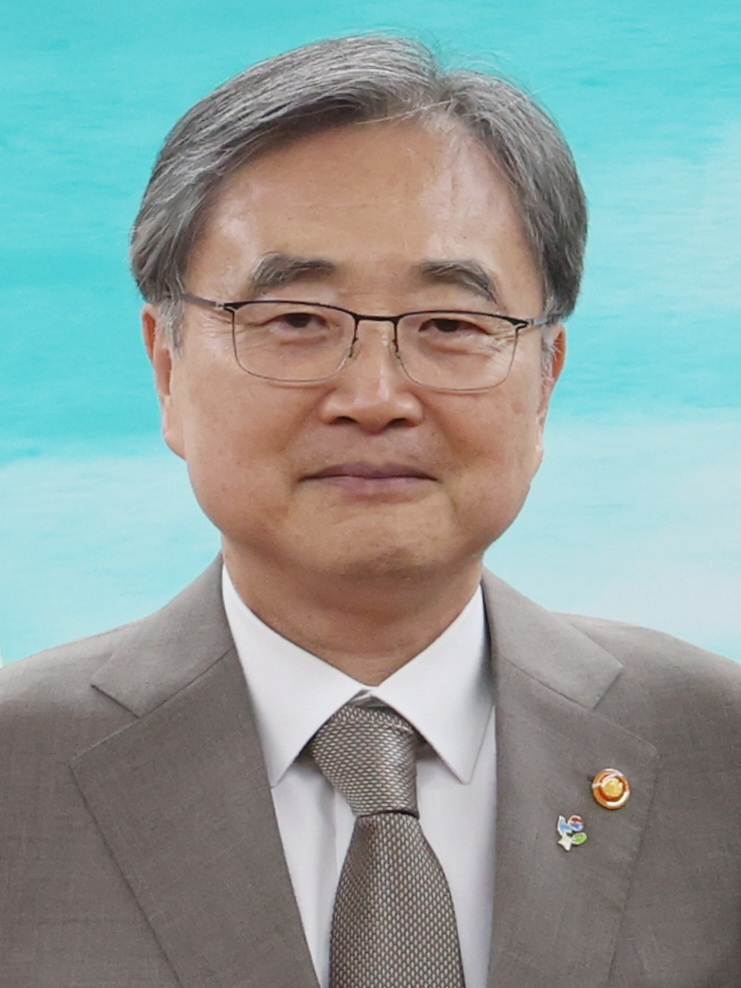
- Incumbent; Cho Hyun since 19 July 2025
- Ministry of Foreign Affairs
- Member of: State Council of South Korea
- Reports to: President of South Korea
- Appointer: President
- Formation: August 25, 1948; 78 years ago
- Deputy: Deputy Minister of Foreign Affairs

The Minister of Foreign Affairs (Korean: 외교부장관; RR: Oegyobujanggwan) of South Korea is the leader and chief executive of the Ministry of Foreign Affairs. The minister is responsible for implementing South Korea's foreign policy.

The current minister for foreign affairs is Cho Hyun, who took office in July 2025.

== List of ministers of foreign affairs ==
Denotes acting minister

No.	Portrait	Name (Birth–Death)	Term of office			President
No.	Portrait	Name (Birth–Death)	Took office	Left office	Time in office	President
1		Jang Taek-sang 장택상 (1893–1969)	15 August 1948	24 December 1948	131 days	Syngman Rhee
2		Lim Byeong-jik 임병직 (1893–1976)	25 December 1948	15 April 1951	2 years, 111 days	Syngman Rhee
3		Byun Young-tae 변영태 (1892–1969)	16 April 1951	28 July 1955	4 years, 103 days	Syngman Rhee
4		Cho Chung-whan 조정환 (1893–1976)	28 July 1955	21 December 1959	4 years, 146 days	Syngman Rhee
—		Choi Kyu-hah 최규하 (1919–2006)	22 December 1959	24 April 1960	124 days	Syngman Rhee
5		Ho Chong 허정 (1896–1988)	25 April 1960	19 August 1960	116 days	Yun Po-sun
6		Chung Il-hyung 정일형 (1904–1982)	23 August 1960	20 May 1961	270 days	Yun Po-sun
7		Kim Hong-il 김홍일 (1898–1980)	21 May 1961	21 July 1961	61 days	Yun Po-sun
8		Song Yo-chan 송요찬 (1918–1980)	22 July 1961	10 October 1961	80 days	Yun Po-sun
9		Choe Deok-sin 최덕신 (1914–1989)	11 October 1961	15 March 1963	1 year, 155 days	Yun Po-sun
9		Choe Deok-sin 최덕신 (1914–1989)	11 October 1961	15 March 1963	1 year, 155 days	Park Chung Hee (acting)
10		Kim Yong-shik 김용식 (1913–1995)	16 March 1963	16 December 1963	275 days	Park Chung Hee (acting)
11		Chung Il-kwon 정일권 (1917–1994)	17 December 1963	24 July 1964	220 days	Park Chung Hee
12		Lee Tong-won 이동원 (1926–2006)	25 July 1964	26 December 1966	2 years, 154 days	Park Chung Hee
13		Chung Il-kwon 정일권 (1917–1994)	27 December 1966	29 June 1967	184 days	Park Chung Hee
14		Choi Kyu-hah 최규하 (1919–2006)	30 June 1967	4 June 1971	3 years, 339 days	Park Chung Hee
15		Kim Yong-shik 김용식 (1913–1995)	4 June 1971	2 December 1973	2 years, 181 days	Park Chung Hee
16		Kim Dong-jo 김동조 (1918–2004)	3 December 1973	18 December 1975	2 years, 15 days	Park Chung Hee
17		Park Tong-jin 박동진 (1922–2013)	19 December 1975	1 September 1980	4 years, 257 days	Park Chung Hee
17		Park Tong-jin 박동진 (1922–2013)	19 December 1975	1 September 1980	4 years, 257 days	Choi Kyu-hah
18		Lho Shin-yong 노신영 (1930–2019)	2 September 1980	1 June 1982	1 year, 272 days	Chun Doo-hwan
19		Lee Bum-suk 이범석 (1925–1983)	2 June 1982	9 October 1983	1 year, 129 days	Chun Doo-hwan
20		Lee Won-kyung 이원경 (1922–2007)	15 October 1983	26 August 1986	2 years, 315 days	Chun Doo-hwan
21		Choi Kwang-soo 최광수 (1935–2021)	27 August 1986	5 December 1988	2 years, 100 days	Chun Doo-hwan
21		Choi Kwang-soo 최광수 (1935–2021)	27 August 1986	5 December 1988	2 years, 100 days	Roh Tae-woo
22		Choi Ho-joong 최호중 (1930–2015)	5 December 1988	27 December 1990	2 years, 22 days	Roh Tae-woo
23		Lee Sang-ock 이상옥 (born 1934)	27 December 1990	26 February 1993	2 years, 61 days	Roh Tae-woo
24		Han Sung-joo 한승주 (born 1940)	26 February 1993	24 December 1994	1 year, 301 days	Kim Young-sam
25		Gong Ro-myung 공로명 (1932–2026)	24 December 1994	7 November 1996	1 year, 319 days	Kim Young-sam
26		Yoo Chong-ha 유종하 (born 1936)	7 November 1996	3 March 1998	1 year, 116 days	Kim Young-sam
27		Park Chung-soo 박정수 (1932–2003)	3 March 1998	4 August 1998	154 days	Kim Dae-jung
28		Hong Soon-young 홍순영 (1937–2014)	4 August 1998	14 January 2000	1 year, 163 days	Kim Dae-jung
29		Lee Joung-binn 이정빈 (born 1937)	14 January 2000	26 March 2001	1 year, 71 days	Kim Dae-jung
30		Han Seung-soo 한승수 (born 1936)	26 March 2001	4 February 2002	315 days	Kim Dae-jung
31		Choi Sung-hong 최성홍 (born 1938)	4 February 2002	27 February 2003	1 year, 23 days	Kim Dae-jung
32		Yoon Young-kwan 윤영관 (born 1951)	27 February 2003	17 January 2004	324 days	Roh Moo-hyun
33		Ban Ki-moon 반기문 (born 1944)	17 January 2004	10 November 2006	2 years, 297 days	Roh Moo-hyun
34		Song Min-soon 송민순 (born 1948)	1 December 2006	29 February 2008	1 year, 90 days	Roh Moo-hyun
35		Yu Myung-hwan 유명환 (born 1948)	29 February 2008	8 September 2010	2 years, 192 days	Lee Myung-bak
36		Kim Sung-hwan 김성환 (born 1953)	8 October 2010	11 March 2013	2 years, 154 days	Lee Myung-bak
37		Yun Byung-se 윤병세 (born 1953)	11 March 2013	18 June 2017	4 years, 99 days	Park Geun-hye
38		Kang Kyung-wha 강경화 (born 1955)	18 June 2017	8 February 2021	3 years, 235 days	Moon Jae-in
39		Chung Eui-yong 정의용 (born 1946)	9 February 2021	11 May 2022	1 year, 91 days	Moon Jae-in
40		Park Jin 박진 (born 1956)	12 May 2022	10 January 2024	1 year, 243 days	Yoon Suk-yeol
41		Cho Tae-yul 조태열 (born 1955)	12 January 2024	18 July 2025	1 year, 187 days	Yoon Suk-yeol
42		Cho Hyun 조현 (born 1957)	19 July 2025	Incumbent	1 year, 106 days	Lee Jae Myung
