= Yuna Kim Olympic seasons =

Olympic champion figure skater 2010 and 2014

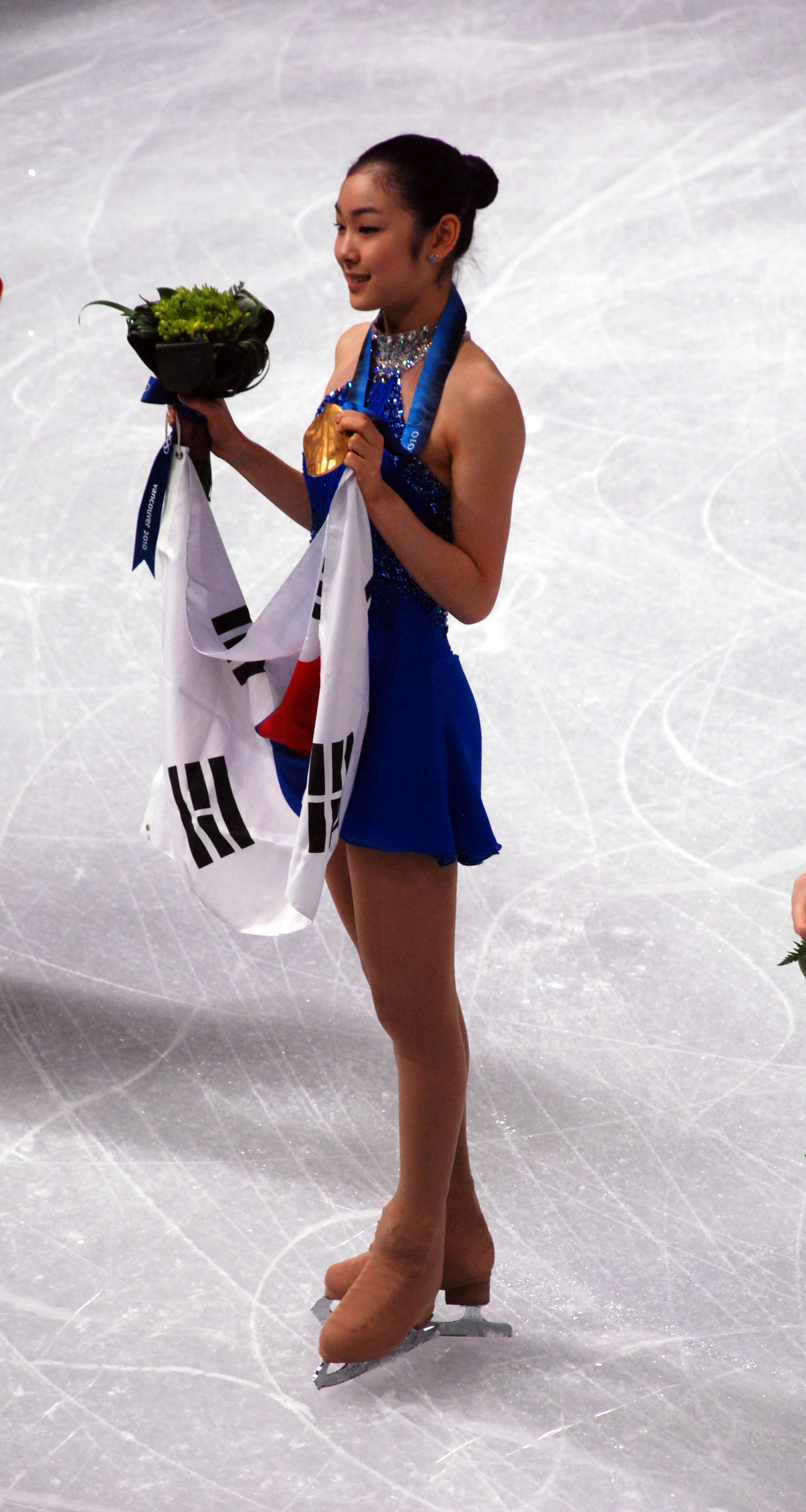
Yuna Kim at the 2010 Olympics Medal Ceremony.

Yuna Kim (Korean: 김연아; born September 5, 1990), is a South Korean retired competitive figure skater. She participated in the Winter Olympic Games twice, winning the gold medal in 2010 and the silver medal in 2014. She is also a two-time World champion (2009, 2013) the 2009 Four Continents champion, a three-time Grand Prix Final champion (2006, 2007, 2009), the 2006 World Junior champion, the 2005 Junior Grand Prix Final champion, and a six-time (2003, 2004, 2005, 2006, 2013, 2014) South Korean national champion.

Kim is the first South Korean figure skater to win a medal at an ISU Junior Grand Prix or ISU Grand Prix of Figure Skating event, the World Figure Skating Championships, and the Olympic Games. She is the first female skater ever to win every major international competition, namely, the Olympic Games, the World Championships, the Four Continents Championships, and the Grand Prix Final. She is one of the most highly recognized athletes and media figures in South Korea. As a result of her numerous accomplishments and popularity, she is frequently referred to as "Queen Yuna".

She is the former record holder for ladies in the short program, free skate and combined total under the ISU Judging System. She has broken world record scores 11 times under the ISU Judging System since 2007, eight of which being records she herself set. She is also the first female skater to surpass the 150-point free skating mark and the 200-point and 220-point total mark, as well as the first and only female figure skater to have never finished off the podium in her entire career. Due to her strong and consistent competitive record, she is regarded as one of the greatest figure skaters of all time.

== 2009–10 season ==
=== Super Slam ===
Kim's goal for the 2009–10 season was to develop her programs, as well as her expression, character, and makeup, to demonstrate more maturity. The idea for her short program came from Sandra Bezic, who pitched Kim "as a sexy, confident Bond girl" to Wilson in 2009. "I have some ideas that I want to put out there," Kim explained. "We made together a detail of my program day by day. The black nail color is also everyone's idea". Juliet Macur from The New York Times stated that Kim's short program "sizzled" and that Kim performed her free skating program "with the grace of a prima ballerina".

Kim was assigned to the 2009 Trophée Éric Bompard and the 2009 Skate America for the 2009–10 ISU Grand Prix season. She laughed as she told a reporter that she usually preferred her short programs because they were shorter and that she felt less pressure, but she liked this season's free skate better because it was "easier to feel and perform it". She also admitted that she did not feel completely prepared, but that she felt better able to deal with the press. At the Trophée Éric Bompard, she placed first in the short program with a score of 76.08 points. According to CBC News, Kim opened her program with a difficult triple Lutz-triple toe loop combination and made a "perfect landing" on all her jumps. After her performance, she pumped her fists and waved to the audience. Opening with a triple Lutz-triple toe loop combination and in "a flawless performance", Kim won the free skate with 133.95 points. Skating to "Piano Concerto in F" by George Gershwin, she also executed a double Axel-double toe loop-double loop combination jump, a double Axel-triple toe loop combination jump, a triple Salchow, a triple Lutz, and a double Axel. Her only error was missing her triple flip. She won the event with 210.03 points. Kim broke her own world records for both the free skate and the overall score.

At the 2009 Skate America, Kim placed first again after the short program with a score of 76.28, ahead of her closest competitor Rachael Flatt from the United States, who later said that she admired Kim, was inspired by her, and enjoyed competing against her. She set a new world record for the short program, marking the fourth straight competition in which she broke world records. As Lynn Rutherford stated in IceNetwork, "None of her world records are safe. She'll break them again and again". Kim later said that every competition was important to her and she considered them practice for the Olympics. Her opening triple Lutz-triple toe combination jump earned her +2 and +3 GOEs. She admitted that she was nervous until the music started and that although she liked her combination jump, she thought that her footwork and final camel combination spin were "slow and struggling". After her short program, Kim told reporters that she was not sure about using music from the Bond films, but eventually came around to the idea because she liked the choreography created by Wilson and felt that it was a good choice for an Olympic year. Orser told reporters that even with Kim's multiple wins, he was "taking nothing for granted".

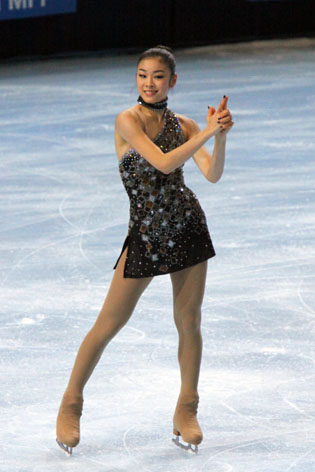
Kim performing her short program to a James Bond medley at the 2009 Trophée Éric Bompard.

Kim placed second in the free skate with a score of 111.70 points, but won the event with 187.98 points. Philip Hersh of the Los Angeles Times noted that Kim was vulnerable to mental pressure, which he speculated could influence her chances at the Olympics. Hersh also pointed out that even though Kim's free skate score was her lowest since her debut on the senior Grand Prix circuit, she won the competition by over 13 points. According to Hersh, Kim's program started badly, with shaky jumps in both parts of her opening combination jump, "and she never completely recovered". She fell on her next jump, a triple flip, and her triple Lutz was ruled a single jump by the judges, who gave her the maximum negative GOEs for it. The judges also gave Kim credit for only three clean jumps. Hersh speculated that Kim's world record score in the short program was both the reason she won Skate America and served as "the albatross she carried into the free skate" due to the pressure to skate perfectly. The South Korean newspaper The Chosun Ilbo called Kim "the clear favorite for the gold" in Vancouver and "in a league of her own".

Kim's victories at both Grand Prix events qualified her for the 2009–10 Grand Prix Final in Tokyo, Japan, in December 2009, with a total of 30 points, the highest score of all the qualifiers. She placed second in the short program with 65.64 points. The next day, she won the free skate with 123.22 points. As a result, Kim won every competition she had entered in 2009 and her third Grand Prix Final title with a total of 188.86 points. During the dress rehearsal for the free skate, Kim's blades collided with each other during a jump, which damaged her left skate blade. The skate was repaired, but it was not in the best condition. In her free skate, which the Korea JoongAng Daily called "an impressive performance", Kim again earned lower GOEs for her combination jump, which she changed from a triple-triple to a triple-double because her first triple jump was not secure. In mid-December, she was chosen to carry the Olympic torch for the second time, running about 300 meters in downtown Hamilton, an hour's drive from where she trained in Toronto.

In February 2010, Kim competed in the women's event at the 2010 Winter Olympics, where she won Olympic gold, thereby completing what has been called her Super Slam. In March 2010, Kim competed at the 2010 World Championships in Turin, Italy. Kim said she had struggled with finding the motivation to compete at the World Championships after winning the gold medal at the Olympics. Orser told reporters from the Associated Press that Kim's feelings were understandable, since it was a common experience for the top skaters after the Olympics. Kim placed seventh in the short program with 60.30 points, the third-worst lowest score of her career and the first time she did not place into the top five. She opened with a triple Lutz-triple toe loop combination jump, but under-rotated her triple flip, missed a layback spin, and had her spiral sequence downgraded. She rebounded in the free skate to win the program with 130.49 points, and won the silver medal with a total of 190.79 points. A fall on her triple Salchow prevented her from scoring enough points to defend her title, but she successfully accomplished her opening triple Lutz-double toe-loop combination jump, her triple Lutz, and her double Axel-double toe loop-double loop combination jump. Kim later admitted that Worlds were mentally difficult for her and that she had seriously considered pulling out of the competition.

=== 2010 Winter Olympics: Gold medal ===
In February 2010, Kim competed in the women's event at the 2010 Winter Olympic Games, held in Vancouver, Canada. She entered the Games as a strong favourite to win the gold. The New York Times reported on the great amount of pressure Kim felt going into the Olympics; Orser scheduled her last interaction with the press before Vancouver in mid-December to help relieve her stress and pressure and on his advice, she skipped an international event in Korea, even though the ISU hadrequested that she attend. Kim told reporters that she was worried about her nerves in Vancouver and said that she was determined to remain calm and focused. She also told Juliet Macur of The New York Times that she was "prepared for anything". Kim chose to stay at an inexpensive hotel instead of at the Olympic Village; her mother, Orser, and David Wilson also stayed in the same hotel.

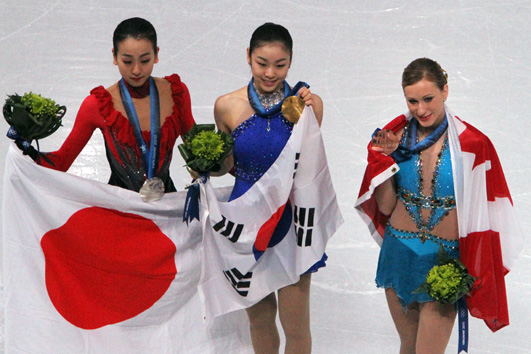
At the 2010 Winter Olympics, with Mao Asada (on the left) and Joannie Rochette (on the right)

In the short program, Kim executed a triple Lutz-triple toe loop combination jump, which reporter Philip Hersh called "stratospheric", a triple flip, and a double Axel. Kim scored 78.50 points. Kim accomplished her best score in the short program, breaking her own world record by over two points. She later told reporters that she felt no pressure going into the free skate. After her short program, Kim was called "in a league of her own". Hersh speculated that it was unlikely that she would lose the free skate and the gold medal, stating that her short program scores were high enough that she could make one major mistake in her free skate and still win.

On February 25, Kim won the free skate, which Agence France-Presse called "a stunning performance" and "spellbinding", with 150.06 points, setting a new world record for the free skate. Bryan Armen Graham of The Atlantic called Kim's free skate "our generation's Nadia Comaneci moment: the abstract of perfection made flesh" and "a performance of such artistic beauty, charisma, and splendor, it may never be surpassed". Skating before Asada in the final group of skaters, she landed six triples and eleven jumps in all: a triple Lutz-triple toe loop combination jump, a triple flip, a double Axel-double toe loop-double loop combination jump, a double Axel-triple toe loop combination jump, a triple Salchow, a triple Lutz, and a double Axel. Overall, Kim totaled 228.56 points, breaking her own personal best and previous world record. Philip Hersh stated that her Olympic free skate was "of transcendent brilliance that brought her immortality in South Korea". Kim later said that it was the first time she had skated cleanly in both her programs, and that she was happy that it happened at the Olympics. She won the gold medal, becoming the first South Korean skater to medal in any discipline of figure skating at the Olympic Games. She defeated silver medalist Mao Asada by 23.06 points, the greatest margin recorded in women's singles at the Olympics or World Championships since the introduction of the ISU Judging System.

Kim's short program, free skate, and combined total scores at the 2010 Winter Olympics were the highest scores since the creation of the ISU Judging System, and were registered in the Guinness World Records. Dorothy Hamill, the 1976 Olympic champion, said that Kim had "jaw-dropping magnificence", adding "The height of her jumps, the power, and the fluid beauty of her skating are like magic". Jacques Rogge, then-president of the International Olympic Committee, stated that Kim's performance "touched me in a way that I haven't been touched since Torvill and Dean in Sarajevo". U.S. Secretary of State Hillary Clinton, who met with and congratulated South Korean Foreign Minister Yu Myung-hwan the following day, also praised Kim's performance, calling it "extraordinary". Ten years later, in 2020, Kim told Hersh that her win confounded her, brought back the nervousness she felt, and overwhelmed her. She also told Hersh, "I’d been pretending to be fearless, but I think the moment the program was over, the pressure that had built up inside me came bursting out". Orser later said that he knew that Kim was going to win the gold medal from the time they arrived in Vancouver. He also said that she was calm and that she took control of what was happening, calling the entire week "just perfection". In South Korea, the stock market halted all business during Kim's performances. She and Orser flew immediately to Seoul after the Olympics to meet with South Korean president Lee Myung-bak at his official residence. Christopher Clarey from The New York Times reported that Kim considered retiring from competition at the end of the season.

== 2013–2014 season: Olympic silver medal ==
For the 2013–14 ISU Grand Prix season, Kim was assigned to compete in the 2013 Skate Canada International and in the 2013 Trophée Éric Bompard. However, on September 26, it was announced that Kim would not compete in the Grand Prix series due to a metatarsal injury to her right foot (bruised bones) from excessive training, with recovery expected to take up to six weeks.

Kim competed in the 2013 Golden Spin of Zagreb, her first competition in nine months. She placed first in the short program with a score of 73.37 points and won the free skate with 131.12 points. According to Yoo Jee-ho of Yonhap News Agency, "the level of competition at the second-tier event in Croatia was far from world class" and pointed out that Kim made unusual errors, which may have meant that she was not yet fully recovered from her foot injury. Yoo stated that Kim's choice of music for her short program, "Send In the Clowns," was a departure from her recent choices, which tended to be set to "more powerful tunes" and could have fallen flat in its choreography, but that Kim made up for it with "a series of exquisite steps and spins". During her short program, Kim landed her opening triple-triple combination jump and added a triple flip, but was unable to complete her double Axel, putting her hand down on the ice. She earned the highest short program component scores of her career and the highest short program score in the Grand Prix that season. Yoo called Kim's free skate, which was set to the tango piece "Adiós Nonino," a "dense, breathless program, jam-packed with complicated step sequences" and the most challenging free skating program of her career. Kim fell after the first jump of her opening triple Lutz-triple toe loop combination jump, but she successfully landed the rest of her jumps and added a double toe loop after her triple Lutz halfway through her program, which earned her extra points. Her overall score was the fifth-best of her career and the third consecutive time she scored over 200 points.

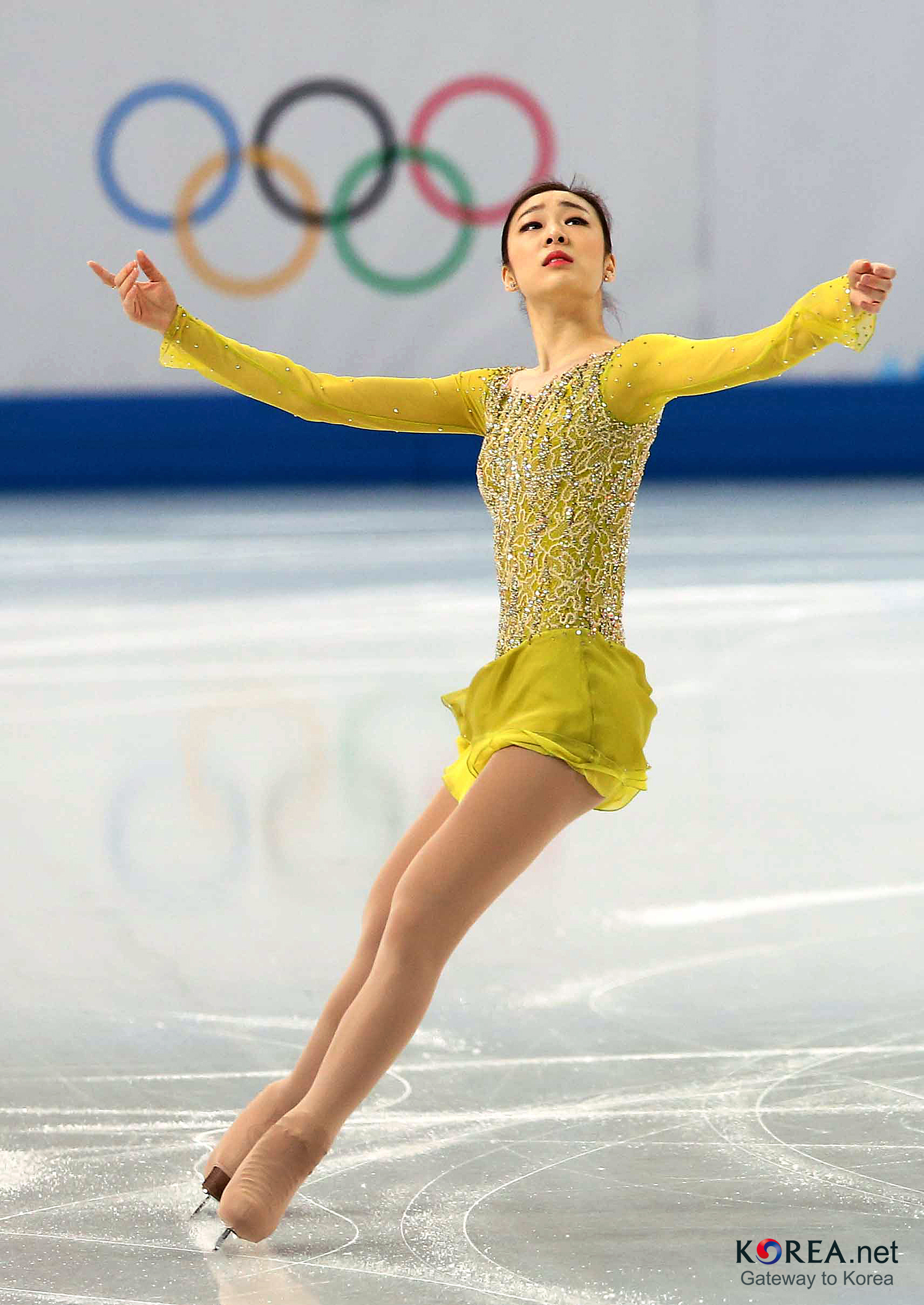
Kim performing her short program during the 2014 Olympics in Sochi

In early January, Kim competed in the 2014 South Korean Championships. She finished first after the short program with 80.60 points, which was her personal best score, and won the free skate, which was called "flawless", with 147.26 points. Kim won her sixth national title with a total score of 227.86 points, the second-highest score ever earned. Yonhap News Agency stated that Kim's victory raised expectations for winning a second gold medal at the Olympics.

In February 2014, Kim competed at the 2014 Winter Olympic Games, seeking to become the first woman to win back-to-back Olympic gold medals since Katarina Witt and with the intention of retiring from competitive skating afterwards. According to Moon Gwang-lip of Korea JoongAng Daily, she did not want to not feel burdened or pressured and wished to finish her career with no regrets. Kim was unable to train on the ice for six weeks before the Olympics due to a foot injury. Bryan Armen Graham reported that she attracted a large group of the press at practices, adding that "she skated well but with almost no spark, seeming almost unhappy at times". She narrowly came in first place after the short program with 74.92 points. Jeré Longman of The New York Times called her short program "a mature and elegant routine, even if it did not equal her stirring performance four years ago at the Vancouver Games". Longman stated that Kim defied the convention that skaters must compete throughout the season at the Grand Prix circuit to remain at the highest levels. She skated earlier than the other favorite competitors, due to her lower international standing, although she later said that it lessened her pressure. Paul Wylie, the 1992 silver Olympic medalist from Canada, stated that it demonstrated that Kim could skate well "whenever, wherever, whatever". Longman reported that Kim appeared anxious during her warm-up, but was able to give "a flowing if imperfect performance dressed in a sparkly chartreuse costume, similar in color to one that Peggy Fleming wore in 1968". Her triple Lutz-triple toe loop combination jump was "bounding and fluid", but her footwork sequence and layback spin appeared "slow and not wholly formed". Scott Hamilton, the 1984 Olympic champion from the U.S., speculated that she might be judged in her free skate in comparison with her 2010 performance, not by her most recent accomplishments or in comparison with the current field of skaters. Graham stated that Kim was probably underscored in her short program, which might have been as a result of her early skating order.

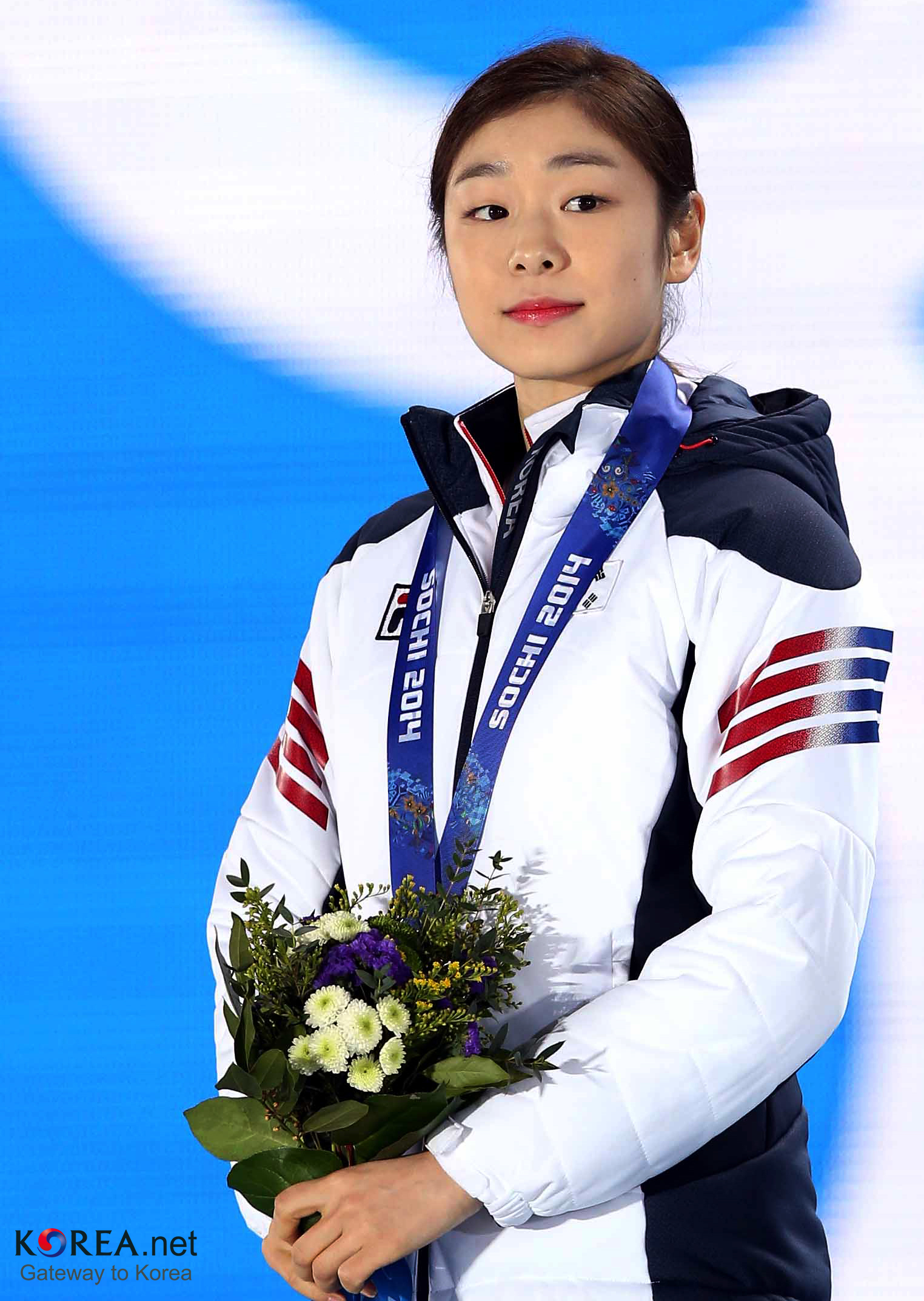
After the medal ceremony at the 2014 Winter Olympics

Skating last in the free skate, Kim successfully executed six triple jumps, three in combination; Adelina Sotnikova from Russia, who won the gold medal, had seven triple jumps in her program. Kim later admitted that she was not as motivated as she was in Vancouver. Graham reported that although the audience cheered throughout the previous two skaters' performances, they were quiet as Kim took the ice; Graham called her "sublime" triple flips and step sequences "the stock-in-trade of an athlete in full command". Graham also stated that Kim's free skate "awed the crowd" and reported that many observers had proclaimed her the winner. Her overall score was 219.11 points, 5.5 points less than Sotnikova's score. Her silver medal win was, as Graham called it, "controversial", and said that it "strikes a blow to the artistry that sets figure skating apart from all other sports—and to many, seems to stink of corruption". Graham cited Sotnikova's free skate score, 149.95 points, which was 40 points higher than her average score over the previous year and less than one point than Kim's free skating score in Vancouver, as well as impropriety about two judges, as the reasons for the controversy. He called the outcry against the decision "swift", reporting that a petition demanding an investigation had crashed Change.org's servers and had garnered 1.8 million signatures. He also stated that although the scores supported Sotnikova's win, "the elegance and virtuosity of Kim's performance were good enough to carry the day in Sochi". Kim declined to comment on the controversy at the press conference after the Olympics and told Philip Hersh in 2020 that her feelings about it had not changed.

Ashley Wagner from the U.S., who had finished in seventh place overall, called for the elimination of anonymous judging in figure skating. Kurt Browning, four-time World champion and commentator for the Canadian Broadcasting Corporation, stated: "Yu-na Kim outskated [Sotnikova], but it's not just a skating competition anymore—it's math". American Olympic champion Dick Button stated: "Sotnikova was energetic, strong, commendable, but not a complete skater". In 2023, the Korean Sport & Olympic Committee requested that the International Olympic Committee (IOC) re-investigate the results of the women's figure skating competition in Sochi after Sotnikova admitted to failing her first doping test earlier that year, but the IOC refused. As anticipated, Kim announced that the 2014 Olympics would mark the end of her competitive skating career and that she would not compete at the 2014 World Championships. During an interview in 2016, David Wilson expressed his "great disappointment" about her retirement.

== Detailed results ==
Results in the 2009–10 season
Date	Event	SP		FS		Total	
Date	Event	P	Score	P	Score	P	Score
Oct 15–18, 2009	(France) 2009 Trophée Éric Bompard	1	76.08	1	133.95	1	210.03
Nov 12–15, 2009	(United States) 2009 Skate America	1	76.28	2	111.70	1	187.98
Dec 3–6, 2009	(Japan) 2009–10 Grand Prix Final	2	65.64	1	123.22	1	188.86
Feb 14–27, 2010	(Canada) 2010 Winter Olympics	1	78.50	1	150.06	1	228.56
Mar 22–28, 2010	(Italy) 2010 World Championships	7	60.30	1	130.49	2	190.79

Results in the 2013–14 season
Date	Event	SP		FS		Total	
Date	Event	P	Score	P	Score	P	Score
Dec 5–8, 2013	(Croatia) 2013 Golden Spin of Zagreb	1	73.37	1	131.12	1	204.49
Jan 1–5, 2014	(South Korea) 2014 South Korean Championships	1	80.60	1	147.26	1	227.86
Feb 6–22, 2014	(Russia) 2014 Winter Olympics	1	74.92	2	144.19	2	219.11
