= Park Tong-Jin =

South Korean politician (1922–2013)

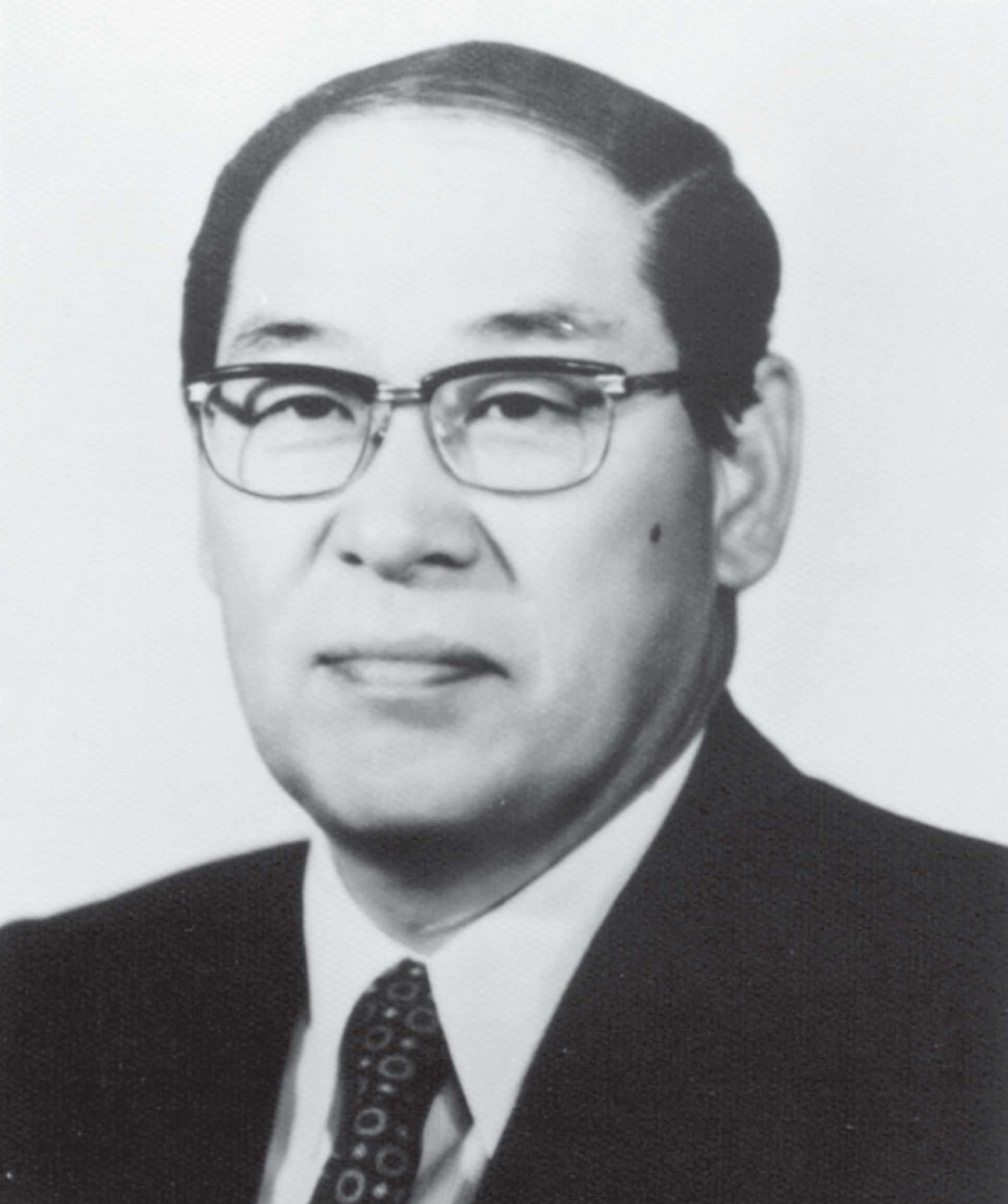
Park Tong-jin

Park Tong-jin (Korean: 박동진; 1922– 11 November 2013) was a South Korean politician. Much of his efforts involved building trade routes between the Soviet Union and non-Soviet countries through South Korea.

From 19 December 1975 to 2 September 1980, he served as Minister of Foreign Affairs.

From 1988 to 1991, he served as South Korean Ambassador to the United States.

He also served as Minister of Unification.

== General references ==
- Gwangju Uprising: The Rebellion for Democracy in South Korea
- South Korea: A Country Study
