= Cho Hyun (diplomat) =

South Korean diplomat (born 1957)

- 조현
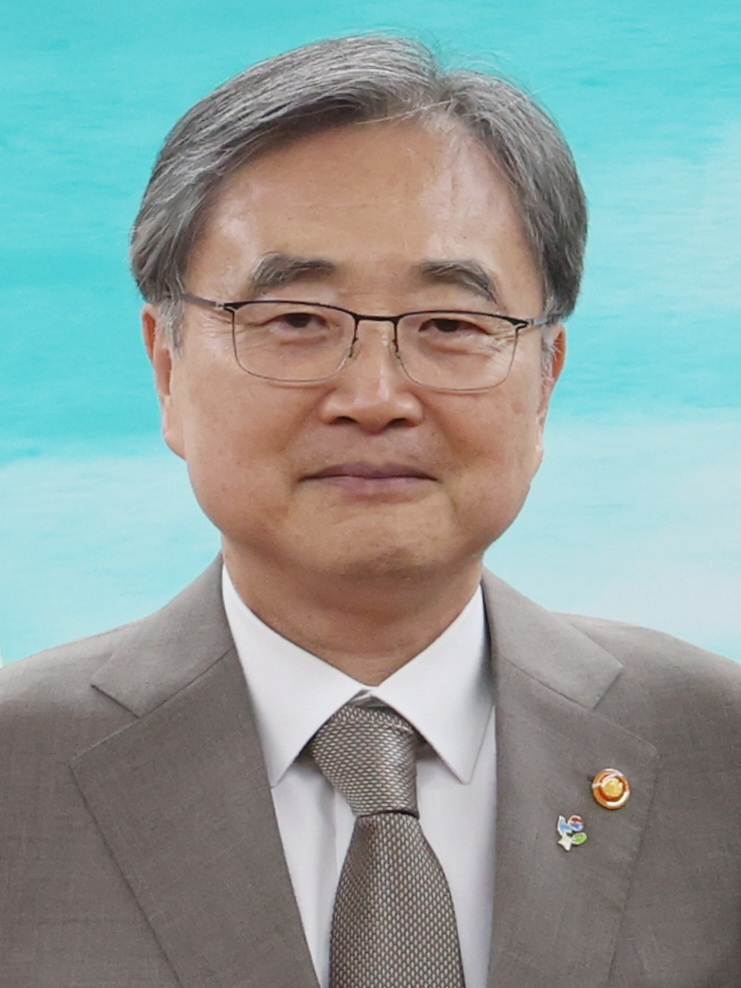
- Cho in 2026

42nd Minister of Foreign Affairs
- Incumbent
- Assumed office 19 July 2025
- President: Lee Jae Myung
- Prime Minister: Kim Min-seok; Han Seong-sook
- Preceded by: Cho Tae-yul

1st Vice Minister of Foreign Affairs
- In office 27 September 2018 – May 2019
- President: Moon Jae-in
- Minister: Kang Kyung-wha

2nd Vice Minister of Foreign Affairs
- In office June 2017 – 27 September 2018
- President: Moon Jae-in
- Minister: Kang Kyung-wha

Personal details
- Born: 30 November 1957 (age 68) Gimje, South Korea

Cho Hyun (Korean: 조현; Hanja: 趙顯; born 30 November 1957) is a South Korean diplomat and government minister who has served as the minister of foreign affairs since July 2025.

== Education ==
Cho studied at Columbia University, Sciences Po Paris and Toulouse Capitole University. He is fluent in French and English.

== Diplomatic career ==
Cho served as the Permanent representative of South Korea to the United Nations from 2019 to 2022. Previously serving as Ambassador to Austria and the IAEA from 2011 to 2014 and India from 2015 to 2017 and was the lead negotiator in the ROK-US civil nuclear cooperation agreement in 2010.

Cho served as vice minister of foreign affairs from 2017 to 2019 under the Moon Jae-in government.
