= Gong Ro-myung =

South Korean politician and diplomat (1932–2026)

Gong Ro-myung (Korean: 공로명; 25 February 1932 – 25 January 2026) was a South Korean diplomat and politician.

== Life and career ==
Gong Ro-myung was born in Myeongcheon on 25 February 1932. He was the minister of foreign affairs (1994–1996), ambassador to Brazil (1983–1986), USSR and Russia (1990–1992) and Japan (1993–1994).

Gong died on 25 January 2026, at the age of 93.
