= Trilateral Cooperation Secretariat =

China-Japan-South Korea organization

Trilateral Cooperation
Secretariat
- - Chinese: 三国合作秘书处
  - Japanese: 日中韓三国協力事務局
  - Korean: 한중일3국협력사무국
- Logo of TCS

- Map of East Asia indicating China (red), Taiwan (pink), Japan (green), South Korea (blue), and North Korea (light blue).
- Headquarters: (South Korea) Seoul; 37°34′11″N 126°58′26″E
- Official languages: English: Working languages: Chinese; Japanese; Korean
- Membership: China; Japan; South Korea

Leaders
  - Secretary-General: (South Korea) Lee Hee-sup
  - Deputy Secretaries-General: (China) Yan Liang; (Japan) Zushi Shuji

Establishment
  - Established: September 1, 2011
- Website tcs-asia.org/en/main/

The Trilateral Cooperation Secretariat (TCS) is an international organization established with a vision to promote "Lasting Peace, Common Prosperity, and Shared Culture" among China, Japan, and South Korea. Upon the agreement signed and ratified by each of the three governments, the TCS was officially inaugurated in Seoul, on 1 September 2011. On the basis of equal participation, each government shares 1/3 of the total operational budget.

== Background ==
=== Development of Trilateral Cooperation ===
The idea of a trilateral framework between China, Japan and the Republic of Korea has its roots in the breakfasts attended by the three leaders at the sidelines of the 1999 ASEAN+3 Summit in Manila. This meeting marked the first step for developing trilateral cooperation and its framework, with 1999 being celebrated as the first year of China-Japan-South Korea cooperation.

The three countries continued to hold annual meetings at the ASEAN+3 Summit. After several years of negotiations, the three countries agreed at the 2007 ASEAN+3 Summit to hold separate stand-alone meetings in the future. Hence, in 2008, what began as a side-conference to the ASEAN meetings officially developed into the first China-Japan-South Korea Trilateral Summit, held in Fukuoka, Japan.

=== Foundation of the Trilateral Cooperation Secretariat (TCS) ===
Discussions of a stand-alone secretariat began in 2009 at the 2nd Trilateral Summit held in Beijing, China. This was officially agreed upon by the three countries in May 2010 at the 3rd Trilateral Summit held in Jeju, Republic of Korea, where the three leaders signed the Memorandum. Later in December 2010, the three governments signed the Agreement on the Establishment of the Trilateral Cooperation Secretariat, and the Trilateral Cooperation Secretariat was finally established in Seoul, Republic of Korea in September 2011.

== Organization ==
The TCS consists of a Consultative Board and four departments.

=== Consultative Board ===
The Consultative Board, the executive decision-making body of the organization, is composed of a secretary-general (SG) and two deputy secretaries-general (DSG). The secretary-general is appointed on a two-year rotational basis in the order of South Korea, Japan, and China. The other two countries nominate a deputy secretary-general each.

	SG	DSG	
1st Board Sep. 2011 - Aug. 2013	SHIN Bong-kil (South Korea)	MATSUKAWA Rui (Japan)	MAO Ning (China)
2nd Board Sep. 2013 - Aug. 2015	IWATANI Shigeo (Japan)	CHEN Feng (China)	LEE Jong-heon (South Korea)
3rd Board Sep. 2015 - Aug. 2017	YANG Houlan (China)	LEE Jong-heon (South Korea)	UMEZAWA Akima (Japan)
4th Board Sep. 2017 - Aug. 2019	LEE Jong-heon (South Korea)	YAMAMOTO Yasushi (Japan)	HAN Mei (China)
5th Board Sep. 2019 - Aug. 2021	MICHIGAMI Hisashi (Japan)	CAO Jing (China)	KANG Do-ho (South Korea)
6th Board Sep. 2021 – Aug. 2023	OU Boqian (China)	BEK Bum-hym (South Korea)	SAKATA Natsuko (Japan)
7th Board Sep. 2023–Present	LEE He-sup (South Korea)	ZUSHI Shuji (Japan)	YAN Liang (China)

=== Departments ===
Under the Consultative Board, there are four departments: Political Affairs, Economic Affairs, Socio-Cultural Affairs, and Management and Coordination. The four departments are composed of officials seconded by the three countries and general service staff recruited through open competition from the three countries.

== Functions ==
Under the mission of promoting "Lasting Peace, Common Prosperity, and Shared Culture," the TCS aims to serve as a hub for the Trilateral Cooperation that encompasses a broad spectrum of sectors and actors.

1. Supporting Trilateral Consultative Mechanism
2. Promoting Public Awareness on Trilateral Cooperation
3. Exploring and Facilitating Cooperative Projects
4. Collaborating with Other International Organizations
5. Compiling Database and Conducting Research

== Projects ==
Youth Exchange

- Trilateral Youth Exchange Network (TYEN)
- Young Ambassador Program (YAP)
- Trilateral Youth Summit (TYS)
- Trilateral Youth Speech Contest (TYSC)
- CAMPUS Asia Alumni Network (CAAN) and Workshop
- CJK Children's Story Exchange Alumni Program
- Young Scholars Forum
- Young Rural Leaders Exchange Program

Promoting trilateral cooperation / Cooperative projects

- International Forum for Trilateral Cooperation (IFTC)
- Trilateral Entrepreneurs Forum (TEF)
- Trilateral Journalist Exchange Program (TJEP)
- CJK Virtual Marathon
- Inter-regional Dialogue for Regional Cooperation

Research and Publications

- Trilateral Statistics Hub
- Report “An Evolving Trilateral Cooperation: Reality and Outlook”
- Trilateral Economic Report
- Trilateral Common Vocabulary Dictionary (TCVD)
- Trilateral Best Practices: Application of Technology for Reducing Disaster Risks in China, Japan and Korea
- Annual Reports
- Other publications relating to political, economic and socio-cultural cooperation
- Compilation of information database regarding trilateral cooperation

== See also ==
- China–Japan–South Korea relations
  - China–Japan–South Korea trilateral summit
  - China–Japan–South Korea Free Trade Agreement
