= China–Japan–South Korea Free Trade Agreement =

Proposed agreement

China, South Korea and Japan in red, dark blue and green respectively. Disputed territories are indicated in lighter shades.

The China–Japan–South Korea Free Trade Agreement (CJSKFTA) is a proposed free trade agreement between China, Japan and South Korea. The China–Japan–South Korea Free Trade Agreement was proposed in 2002. Negotiations on the agreement were set in motion in 2012. At the time, the three nations made up to 19.6% of the world's economy. Two-way trade between South Korea and China was totaled at $230 billion in 2013.

These talks mostly occurred in parallel with negotiations on the Regional Comprehensive Economic Partnership (RCEP) a free trade agreement that includes China, Japan, and South Korea along with Australia, New Zealand, and the ten member states of ASEAN. RCEP negotiations began in earnest in 2013 and the agreement went into effect in 2021. The three nations continued to negotiate an additional, more comprehensive agreement. A trilateral investment has been signed by all 3 nations.

The first official talks on the matter were held in Seoul from 26 to 28 March 2013. Further talks were held in China and Japan throughout 2013 and continued to be held with relative consistency until 2019.

Talks stalled after the second 2019 summit, but resumed in 2024 with the first China–Japan–South Korea trilateral summit in over 4 years. Talks after 2019 have been mired by weak public interest in Japan and South Korea and increased geopolitical tension between China and the other two potential members. Additionally the implementation of RCEP has made the creation of a new trade agreement less pressing.

In March 2025, industry, trade and commerce officials from the three nations met to discuss enhanced trade in the face of US President Donald Trump's tariff threats. The South Korean Trade Minister Ahn Duk-geun said at the summit "[it] is necessary to strengthen the implementation of RCEP, in which all three countries have participated, and to create a framework for expanding trade cooperation among the three countries through Korea-China-Japan FTA negotiations."

== See also ==
- China–Japan–South Korea relations
- China–Japan–South Korea trilateral summit
- Trilateral Cooperation Secretariat
