= Kim Sung-hwan (diplomat) =

South Korean politician (born 1953)

- 김성환
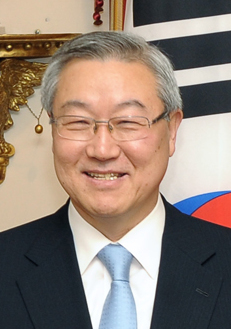
- Kim in 2012

Minister of Foreign Affairs and Trade
- In office 8 October 2010 – 11 March 2013
- President: Lee Myung-bak
- Preceded by: Yu Myung-hwan
- Succeeded by: Yun Byung-se

Personal details
- Born: 13 April 1953 (age 73) Seoul, South Korea
- Party: Saenuri
- Children: Two daughters
- Education: Seoul National University
- Profession: Diplomat

Korean name
- Hangul: 김성환
- Hanja: 金星煥
- RR: Gim Seonghwan
- MR: Kim Sŏnghwan

Kim Sung-hwan (Korean: 김성환; born 13 April 1953) is a South Korean politician who was South Korea's Minister of Foreign Affairs and Trade from 8 October 2010 to 24 February 2013. His previous positions include Vice Minister of Foreign Affairs and Trade (from March 2008) and Senior Secretary to the President for Foreign Affairs and National Security (from June 2008).
