= Cho Chung-whan =

South Korean politician (1892–1967)

Cho Chung-whan 조정환
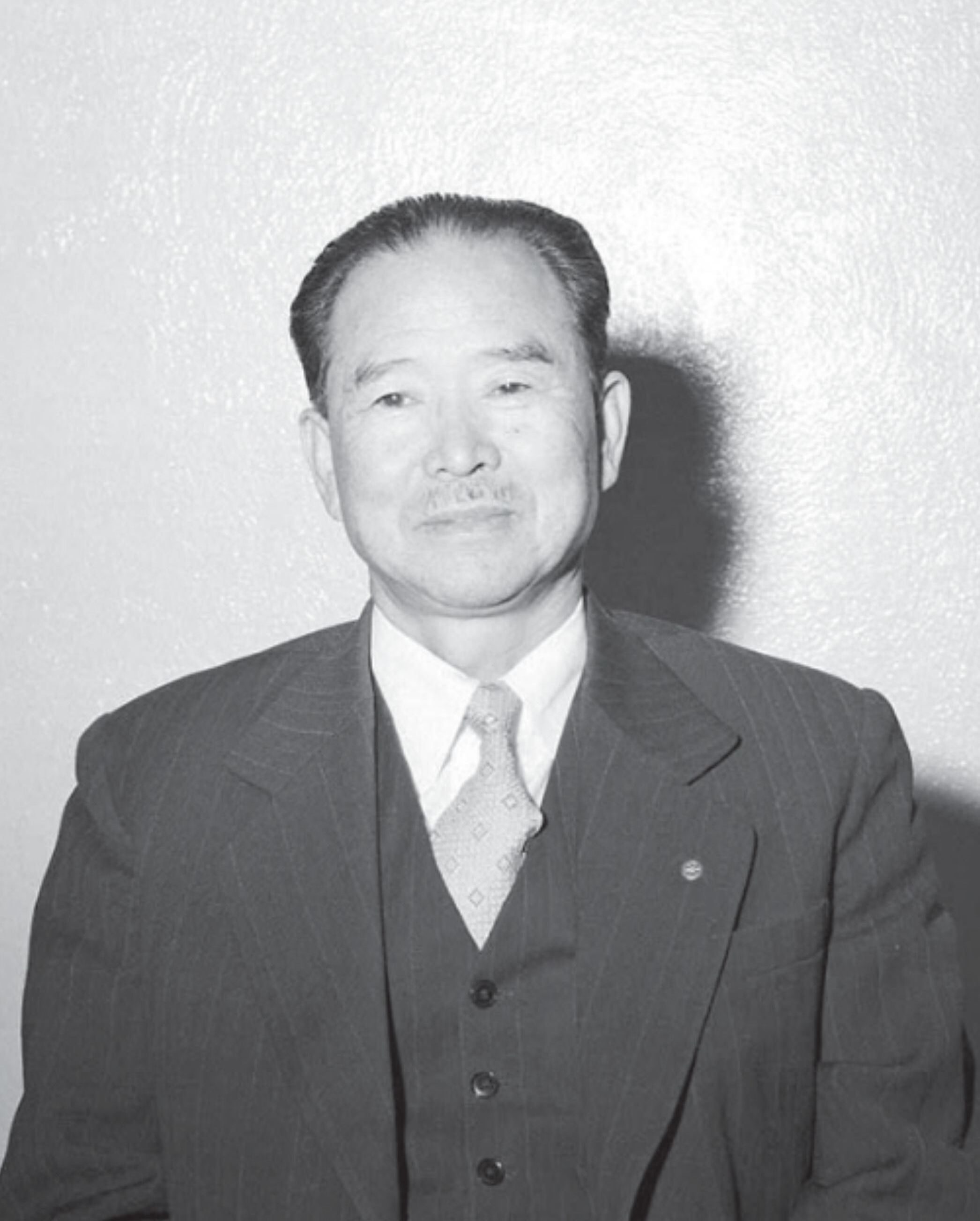

4th Minister of Foreign Affairs
- In office July 28, 1955 – December 21, 1959
- President: Syngman Rhee
- Preceded by: Pyon Yong-tae
- Succeeded by: Ho Chong

Personal details
- Born: December 10, 1892 Yeosu, South Jeolla Province, Joseon
- Died: November 25, 1967 (aged 74) New York City, New York, United States
- Party: None
- Education: University of Michigan

Korean name
- Hangul: 조정환
- RR: Jo Jeonghwan
- MR: Cho Chŏnghwan

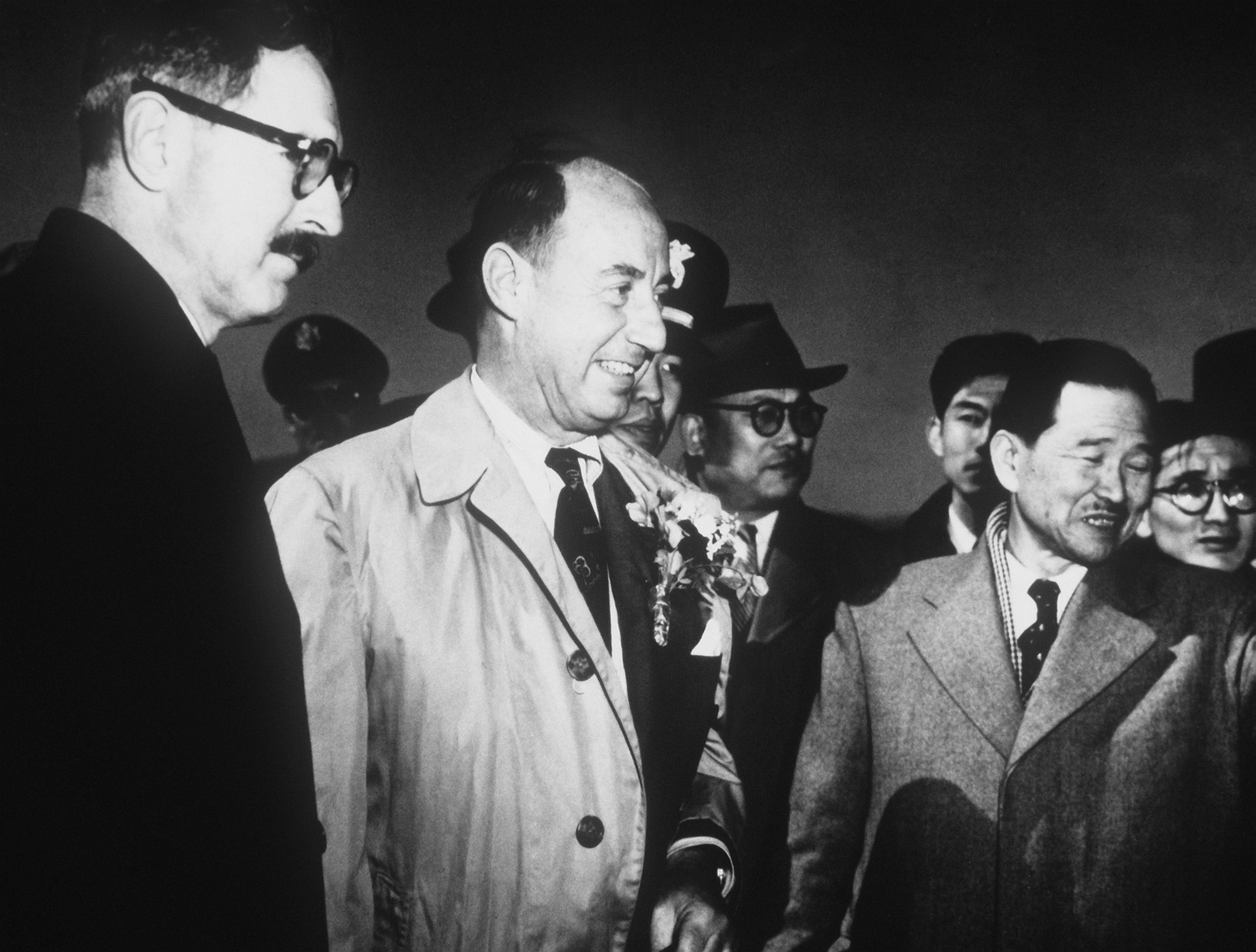
Cho Chung-whan (right) with Ellis O. Briggs and Adlai Stevenson II (1953)

Cho Chung-whan (Korean: 조정환; 10 December 1892 – 25 November 1967) was a South Korean diplomat. He was a deputy foreign minister and consisted of a South Korean domestic task force for the Geneva Political Conference held in Geneva, Switzerland from April to July 1954.
