= Yun Byung-se =

South Korean politician (born 1953)

- 윤병세
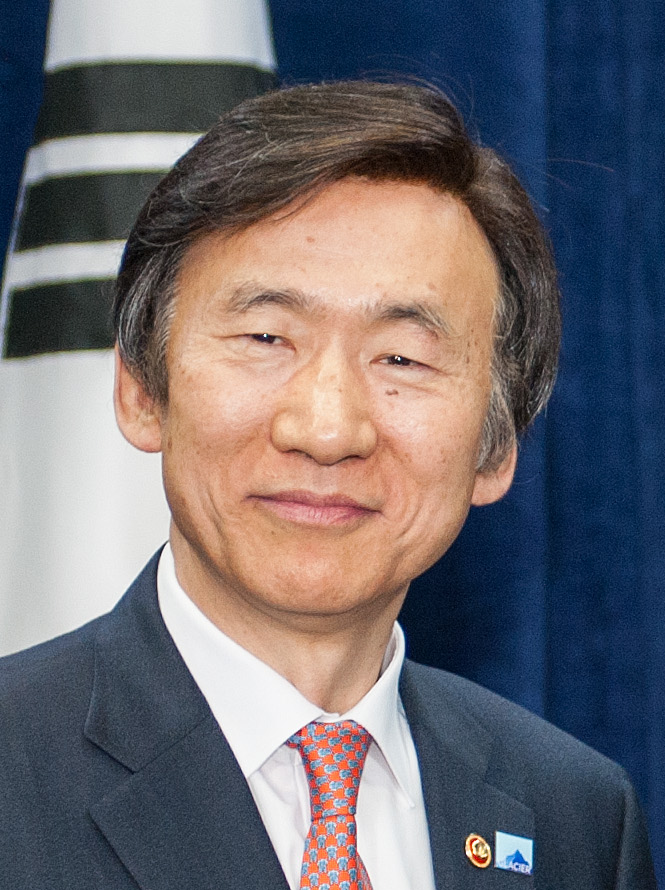
- Yun in 2015

35th Minister of Foreign Affairs
- In office 11 March 2013 – 18 June 2017
- Prime Minister: Chung Hong-won; Lee Wan-koo; Choi Kyoung-hwan (Acting); Hwang Kyo-ahn; Yoo Il-ho (Acting); Lee Nak-yeon
- Preceded by: Kim Sung-hwan
- Succeeded by: Kang Kyung-wha

Personal details
- Born: 3 August 1953 (age 73) Seoul, South Korea
- Party: Liberty Korea Party
- Children: 1 daughter
- Education: Seoul National University; Johns Hopkins University

Korean name
- Hangul: 윤병세
- Hanja: 尹炳世
- RR: Yun Byeongse
- MR: Yun Pyŏngse

Yun Byung-se (Korean: 윤병세; born 3 August 1953) was the Foreign Affairs Minister of South Korea. His term ended 31 May 2017. From 2006 to 2008, Yun served as senior presidential secretary for foreign, security and unification policy.

== Early career (1977–2013) ==
Yun joined the Ministry of Foreign Affairs in 1977. Since 1984, he has worked in Sydney, New York, the United Nations, Singapore, and Geneva. He served as vice foreign minister in 2004.

== Minister of Foreign Affairs (2013–2017) ==
He was foreign minister from 2013 to 2017.

=== Middle East ===
Yun Byung-se visited Iran in 2015 and met with the country's Foreign Minister Mohammad Javad Zarif and the president.

== See also ==
- List of foreign ministers in 2017
- Foreign relations of South Korea

Political offices
Preceded by Kim Sung-hwan	Minister of Foreign Affairs; 2013–2017	Succeeded by Kang Kyung-wha
