= Yu Myung-hwan =

South Korean politician (born 1946)

- 유명환
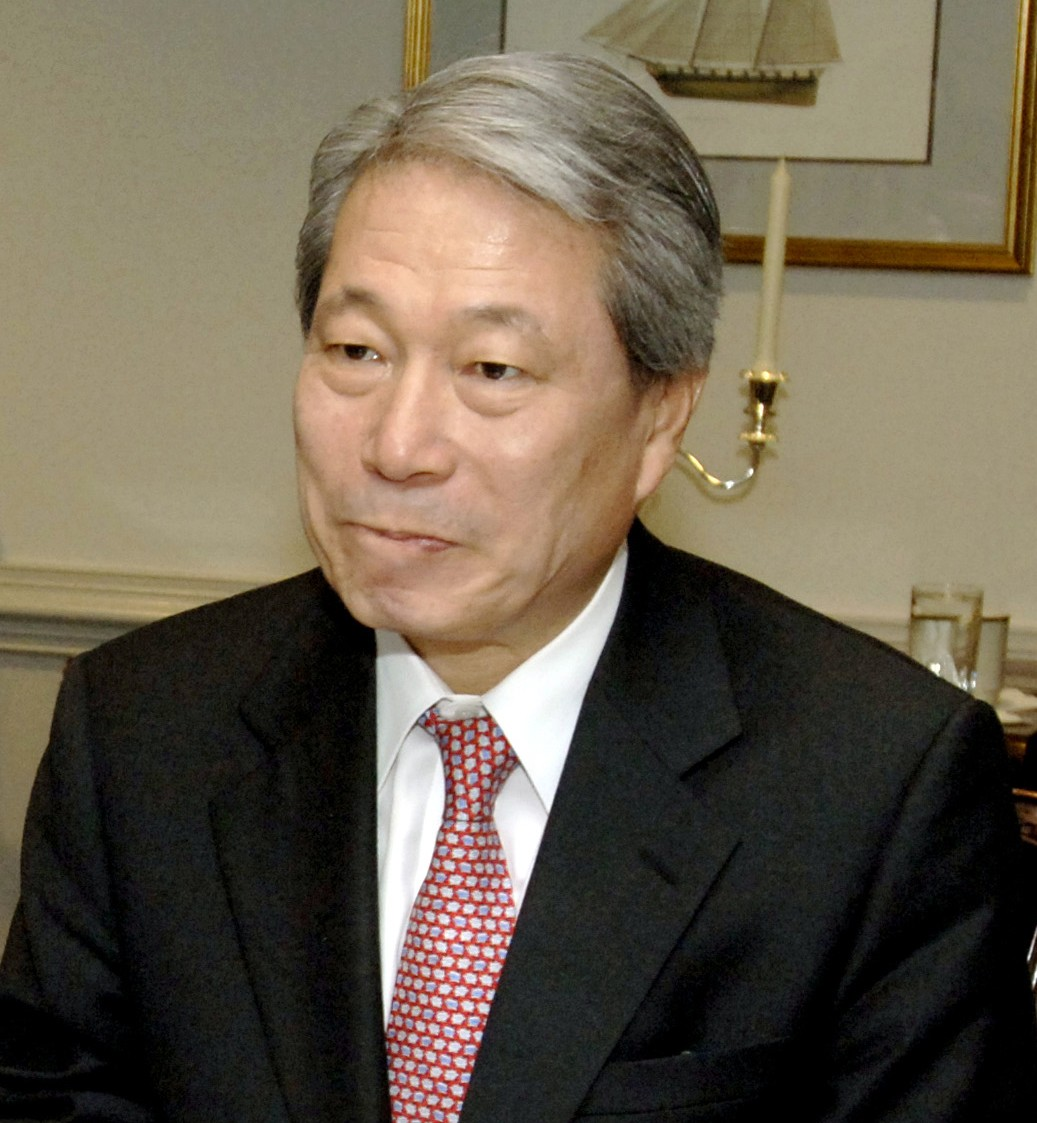
- Yu meeting Robert Gates at the Pentagon in 2008

Minister of Foreign Affairs and Trade
- In office 29 February 2008 – 4 September 2010
- President: Lee Myung-bak
- Preceded by: Song Min-soon
- Succeeded by: Kim Sung-hwan

- Yu Myung-hwan
- Hangul: 유명환
- Hanja: 柳明桓
- RR: Yu Myeonghwan
- MR: Yu Myŏnghwan

Yu Myung-hwan (Korean: 유명환; born April 8, 1946) is a South Korean diplomat, he was Minister for Foreign Affairs and Trade from February 2008 to September 2010. His resignation was caused when his daughter was given a job in his department. He has previously held posts including Ambassador to Israel, Japan and the Philippines. Yu received his bachelor's degree in public administration from Seoul National University.

== Nepotism charges ==
In 2010, Yu has resigned over accusations of nepotism involving his daughter. Yu's daughter, Yu Hyun-sun, was employed at the foreign ministry as a mid-level director through a special employment program.

== Honours ==
- Grand Cordon of the Order of the Rising Sun (2015)

Political offices
Preceded by Song Min-soon	Minister of Foreign Affairs and Trade of South Korea; February 29, 2008–September 4, 2010	Succeeded by Kim Sung-hwan
