= Song Min-soon =

South Korean politician (born 1948)

- 송민순
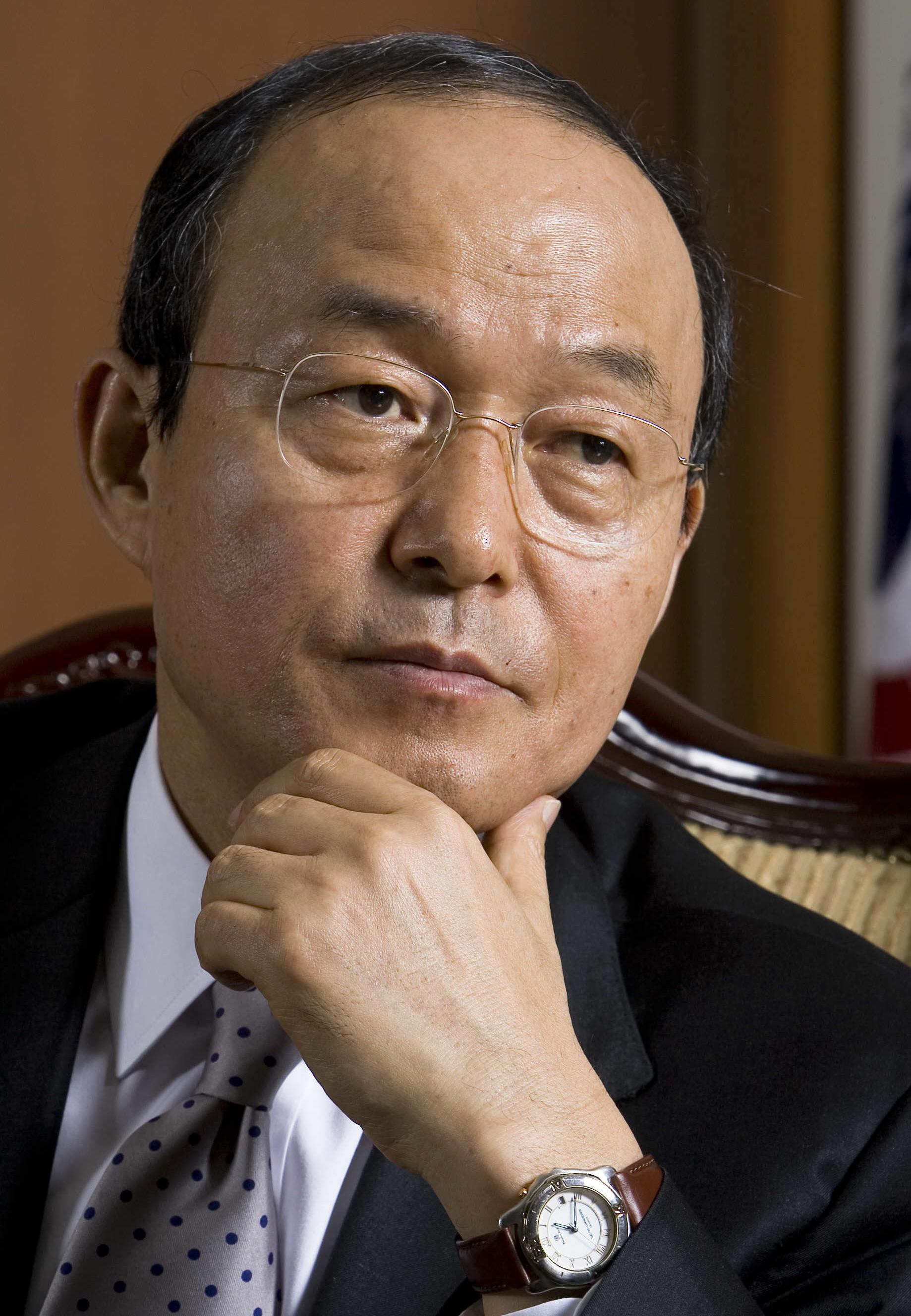

Member of the National Assembly
- In office May 30, 2008 – May 30, 2012

Minister of Foreign Affairs and Trade
- In office December 1, 2006 – February 29, 2008
- President: Roh Moo-hyun
- Preceded by: Ban Ki-moon
- Succeeded by: Yu Myung-hwan

National Security Advisor
- In office January 2006 – November 2006
- President: Roh Moo-hyun
- Succeeded by: Baek Jong-chun

Personal details
- Born: 28 July 1948 (age 78) Jinyang, South Gyeongsang Province, South Korea
- Party: Democratic Party
- Education: Seoul National University (BA)

Korean name
- Hangul: 송민순
- Hanja: 宋旻淳
- RR: Song Minsun
- MR: Song Minsun

Song Min-soon (Korean: 송민순; IPA: [sʰo̞ŋ minsʰun]; born July 28, 1948) is a South Korean politician and diplomat who served as the Minister of Foreign Affairs and Trade from 2006 until 2008.

== Early life (1948–1975) ==
Born in Jinyang (present-day Jinju) in 1948, Song studied at Masan High School and received his B.A. in German Literature from Seoul National University in 1975. He served in the Army for three years, completing his military service before graduation, and passed the Korean foreign service exam in 1975.

== Work in government (September 1975–February 2008) ==
=== Ministry of Foreign Affairs and Trade (1975–2006) ===
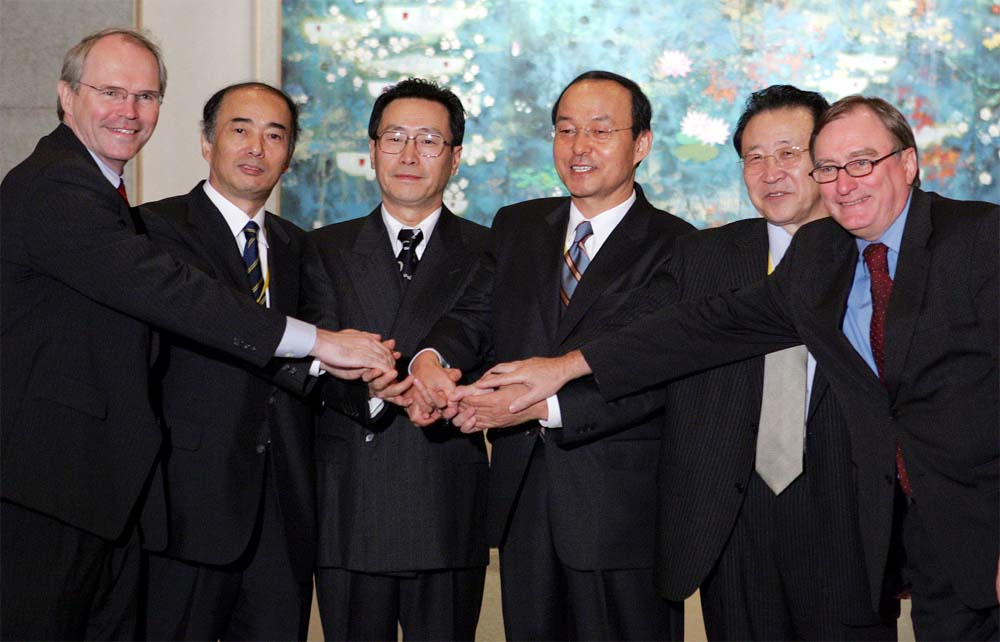
Song Minsoon as chief South Korean negotiator at the Six-Party Talks in 2005

As a young diplomat, Song had his first foreign posting in Germany. Subsequently, he had the opportunity to work around the globe through assignments in India, the United States, Singapore, and Poland.

Between 1989 and 1991, Song participated in the successful completion of the First Revised Status of Forces Agreement (SOFA) between the United States and Korea.

As Director-General of the North American Affairs Bureau, Song headed the Second U.S.-Korea Revised SOFA negotiations (1999–2000), successfully improving upon the previous agreement in seven fields, including environmental protection and criminal trial procedures.

In December 2000, Song led the U.S.-Korea Missile Technology Control Regime (MTCR) negotiations, and in March 2001, he was appointed ROK's Ambassador to the Republic of Poland.

As Deputy Minister for Political Affairs, Song was Chief Negotiator to the Six-Party Talks. His efforts helped produce what has now become the quintessential blueprint for achieving a nuclear-free Korean Peninsula: the Joint Statement of September 19, 2005. The following are the main achievements of the Statement:

- The Six Parties unanimously reaffirmed that the goal of the Six-Party talks is the verifiable denuclearization of the Korean Peninsula in a peaceful manner.
- The DPRK committed to abandoning all nuclear weapons and existing nuclear programs and returning, at an early date, to the Treaty on the Non-Proliferation of Nuclear Weapons and to IAEA safeguards.
- The 1992 Joint Declaration of the Denuclearization of the Korean Peninsula should be observed and implemented.
- The DPRK stated that it has the right to peaceful uses of nuclear energy.
- The other parties expressed their respect and agreed to discuss, at an appropriate time, the subject of the provision of light water reactor to the DPRK.
- The DPRK and the United States undertook to respect each other's sovereignty, exist peacefully together, and take steps to normalize their relations subject to their respective bilateral policies.
- China, Japan, ROK, Russia and the US stated their willingness to provide energy assistance to the DPRK.
- The directly related parties will negotiate a permanent peace regime on the Korean Peninsula at an appropriate separate forum.
- The Six Parties agreed to take coordinated steps to implement the afore-mentioned consensus in a phased manner in line with the principle of "commitment for commitment, action for action".

Through these top diplomatic assignments and achievements, Song made a lasting impact on the furtherance of Korean diplomacy and the international effort to denuclearize North Korea.

=== National Security Adviser (2006) ===
In January 2006, President Roh Moo-hyun appointed Song as his National Security Adviser. During his time as National Security Adviser, Song was accredited to have successfully handled two major foreign policy crises: North Korea's missile launching incident in July and its first nuclear test in October.

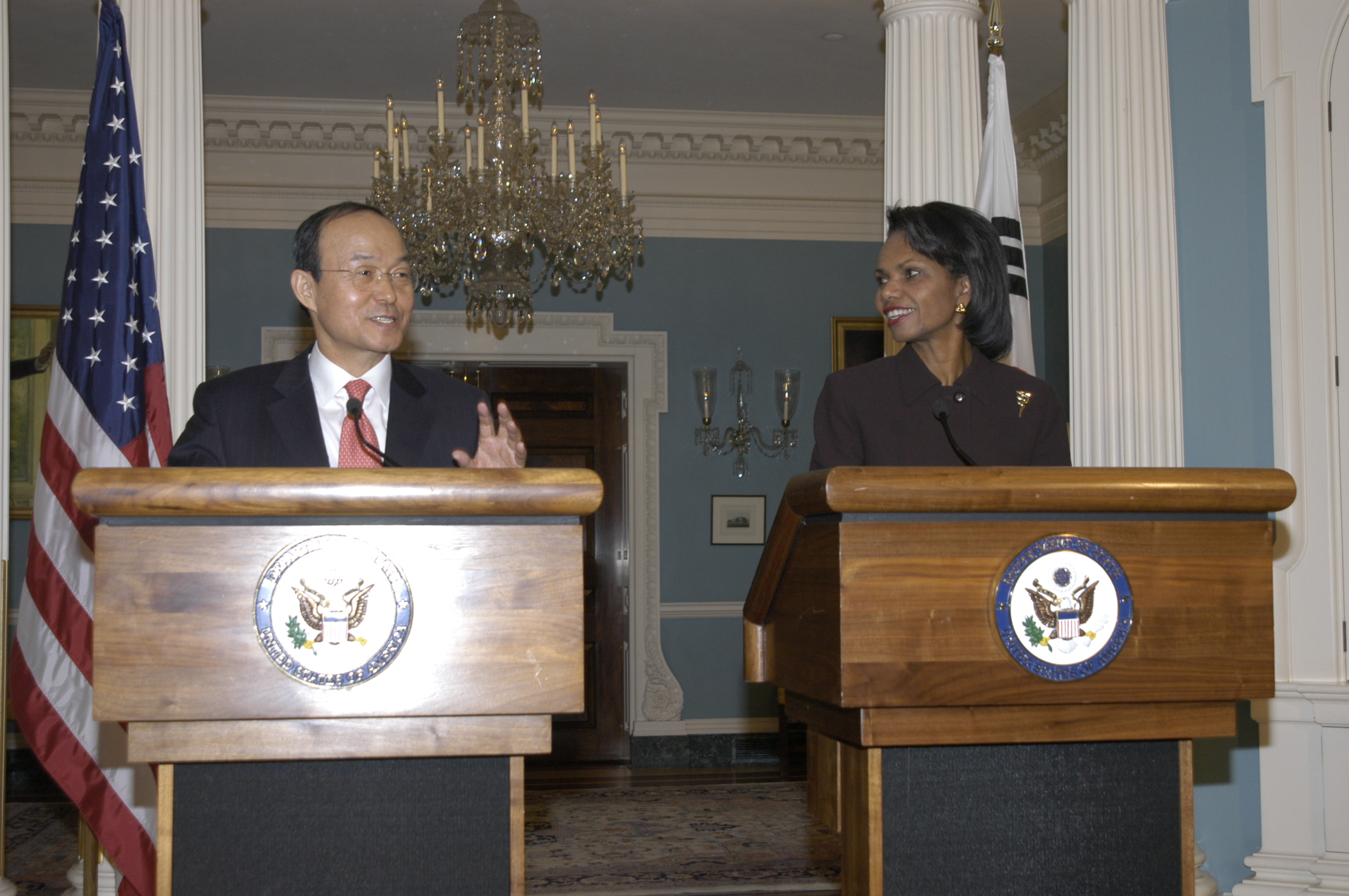
Song Minsoon with former US Secretary of State Condoleezza Rice in 2007

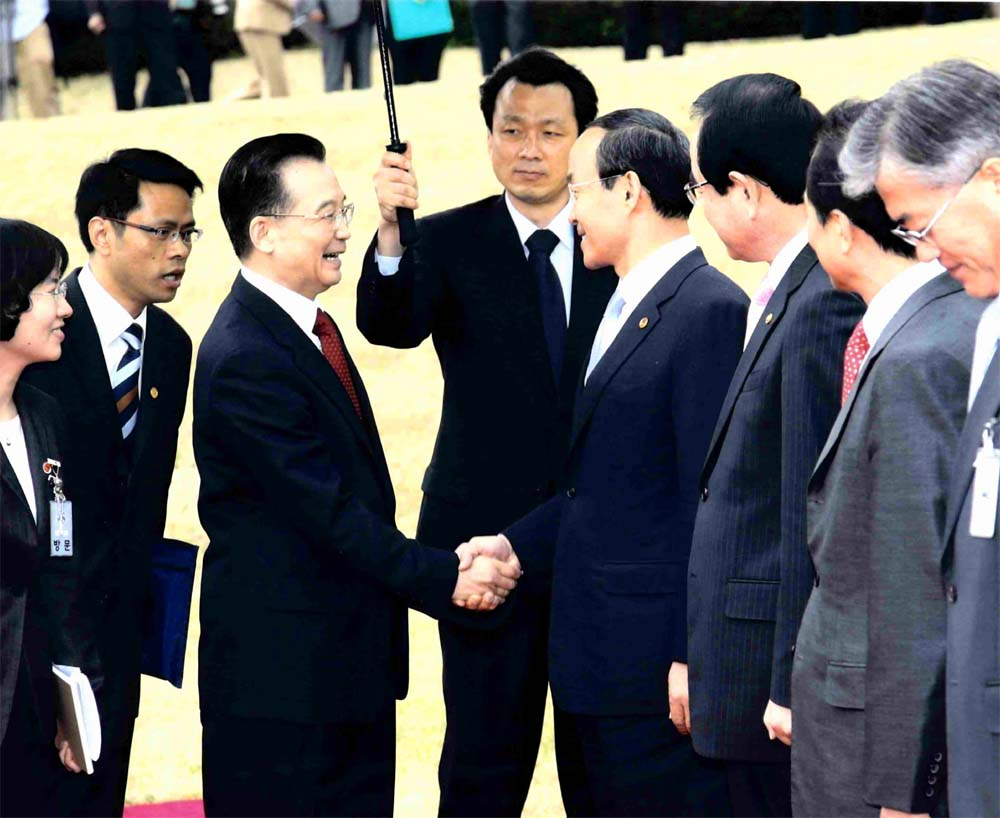
Song Minsoon with Chinese Prime Minister Wen Jiabao in 2007

=== 34th Minister of Foreign Affairs and Trade (2006–2008) ===
In December 2006, Song was appointed the 34th Minister of Foreign Affairs and Trade of the Republic of Korea. He succeeded Ban Ki-moon and cooperated with world-wide leaders to drive forward the Six-Party Talks. Significantly, Song's leadership helped achieve the Initial Actions for Implementation of the Joint Statement, issued on Tuesday February 13, 2007. This was heralded as one of the most significant milestones in the international effort to denuclearize North Korea and bring peace to the Korean peninsular. The major points in the agreement were that:

- North Korea will shut down and seal the Yongbyon nuclear facility, including the reprocessing facility and invite back IAEA personnel to conduct all necessary monitoring and verifications.
- In return, the other five parties in the six-party talks will provide emergency energy assistance to North Korea in the initial phase of 50,000 tons of heavy fuel oil, to commence within 60 days.
- All six parties agree to take positive steps to increase mutual trust, and make joint efforts for lasting peace and stability in Northeast Asia. Directly related parties will negotiate a permanent peace regime on the Korean Peninsula at an appropriate separate forum.
- All six parties agree on establishing five working groups - on the denuclearization of the Korean Peninsula, normalization of North Korea-U.S. relations, normalization of North Korea-Japan relations, economy and energy cooperation, as well as a joint Northeast Asia peace and security mechanism.

This Joint Statement led to the shutting-down of North Korea's plutonium producing plant at Yongbyon in July. In October, Pyongyang started to disable the Yongbyon plant by removing eight thousand fuel rods from the nuclear reactor.

Another significant achievement while Song was in office was the conclusion of the U.S.-Korea Free Trade Agreement (KORUS FTA) in 2007. This is the largest FTA that Korea has signed with a single country, and the first U.S. FTA to be signed with a major Asian economy. The FTA now stands pending in the legislatures of both sides of the Pacific.

== Work in the National Assembly (June 2008-present) ==
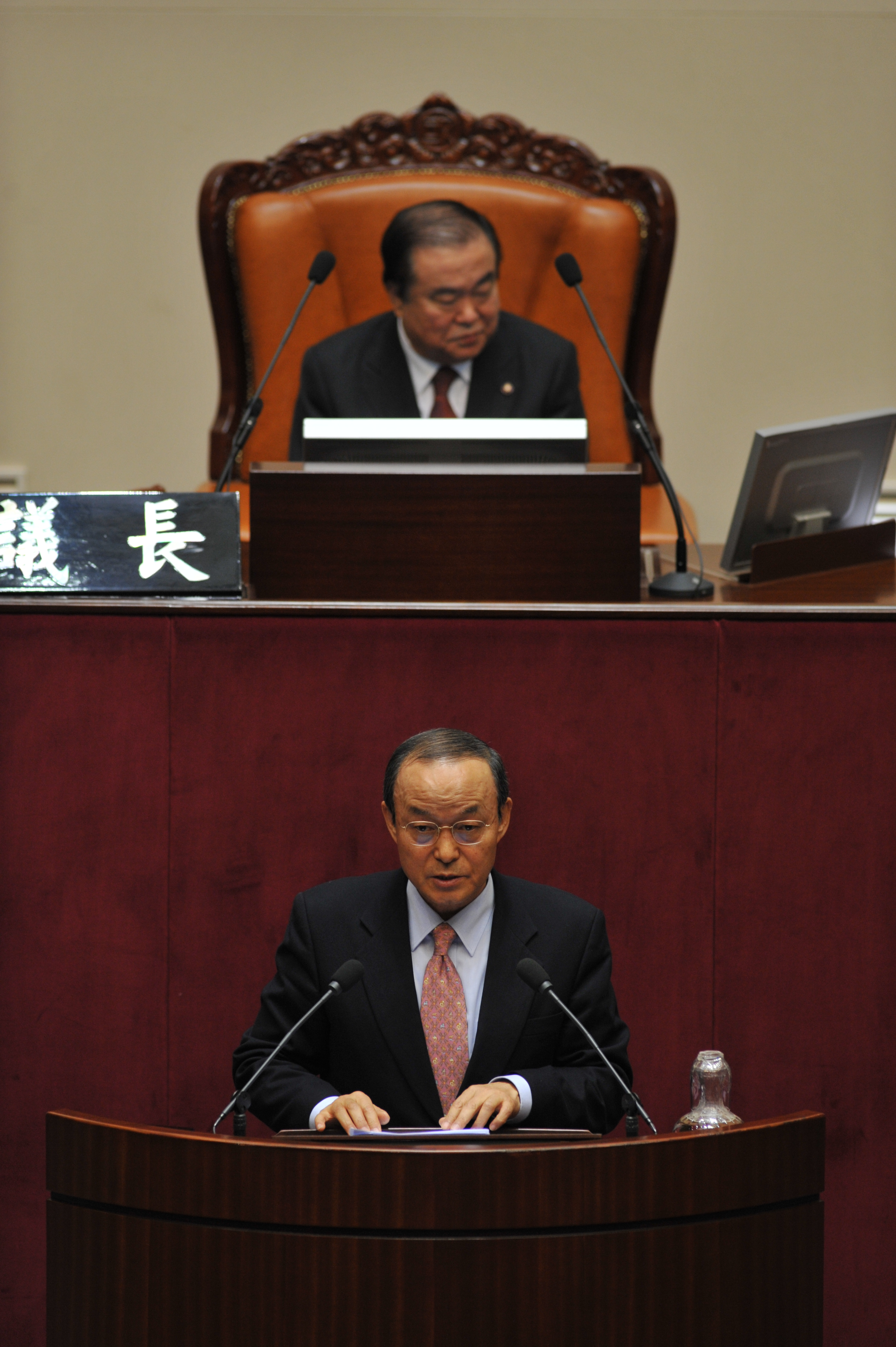
Song Minsoon introducing a draft act on Korean participation in United Nations Peace Keeping Operations to the National Assembly of South Korea in 2009

Elected to the 18th National Assembly in June 2008, Song now serves on the Foreign Affairs, Trade & Unification Committee. As a new member of the National Assembly, he has been promoting legal reforms that address important foreign policy challenges, such as improving Korea's Official Development Assistance (ODA) policies and streamlining procedures for a more rapid deployment of Korean UN PKO forces. Another major area of interest has been the settlement of North Korean defectors in South Korea who are currently not receiving adequate vocational training. As a corrective, Song has proposed that current laws mandating an eight-week training period be revised to provide for at least one year of diversified and specialized training programs.

His major legislations so far have been:

- Laws
  - Framework Act on International Development Cooperation (2009)
  - Act on Korean Participation in United Nations Peace Keeping Operations (2009)
  - Amendment of the Act on the Protection and Assistance of North Korean Refugees in Korea (2009)
  - Amendment of the Inter-Korean Cooperation Fund Act (2010)
- Resolutions
  - Resolution on Supporting Korea's Entry to the Development Assistance Committee (DAC) of the Organization of Economic Cooperation and Development(OECD) and Urging the Reform of Korea's Official Development Assistance (ODA) system (Feb 2009)
  - Resolution Calling on the Improvement of Human Rights in North Korea and the Promotion of Inter-Korean Cooperation(Oct 2010)

In seeking to enhance Korea's global standing and accelerate inter-Korean reconciliation, Song continues to collaborate with colleagues within and without the National Assembly in a principled and bipartisan manner. He hopes that these efforts will ultimately pave the way for creating a reunified nation that is democratic, market-oriented, denuclearized, and friendly to all neighbors.

== See also ==
- Politics of South Korea
- Foreign relations of South Korea
- Military history of the United States

Political offices
Preceded by Ban Ki-moon	Minister of Foreign Affairs and Trade of South Korea; 2006–2008	Succeeded by Yu Myung-hwan
