= Africa–South Korea relations =

International relations

Africa–South Korea relations relations
- AU: South Korea

Africa–South Korea relations refers to the diplomatic relations between the Republic of Korea (South Korea) and the continent of Africa. South Korea and the countries that comprise Africa have a history of political, economic, militaristic, social, and cultural relations with one another since South Korea's establishment.

The Cold War had a major influence over the development of African-South Korean relations, as countries which established firm relations with either North Korea or South Korea during this time would be perceived as supporting communist ideology and countries or capitalist ideologies and countries, respectively. Likewise, decolonization played an important role in these relations as newly independent African states could choose to align or not align with either Korea. The end of the Cold War brought about major change for African and South Korean foreign relations, with most African countries currently having official diplomatic relations with South Korea and unofficial relations with North Korea.

== Historical / diplomatic relations ==
=== Development of relations ===
Progression of the Korean War

The history of exchanges between Korea and African countries began only in the mid-20th century. This was mainly due to geographical and previous technological logistics, as well as the fact that Korea lost its national sovereignty until 1945 during the Japanese colonial era in the early 20th century.

Therefore, official diplomatic and historical relations between Korea and Africa began after the Korean War in the 1950s. During the Korean War, which broke out on June 25, 1950, Ethiopian army units and South African units participated in the Korean War as UN forces; especially Mehal Sefari, the Ethiopian emperor’s bodyguard unit that was dispatched to South Korea, while Ethiopia was the poorest country in the world at the time. Ethiopia's aid to South Korea has resulted in particularly friendly relations since the end of the Korean War. For this reason, the African Union's office is located in the Ethiopian embassy in South Korea. The South Korean government has since built a memorial park for Ethiopian soldiers to honor them and their service.

Beyond friendly relations with Ethiopia, South Korea during its first two republics tended to hold relations exclusively with first-world, Western nations as they blocked out contact with communist countries, and did not reach out to other third-world nations.

=== 1960–70s Africa-South Korea relations ===
By the 1960s, many African countries had achieved independence from Western powers. Accordingly, South Korea started to establish diplomatic relations with the countries on the African continent. What is particular to this era is that South Korea's African diplomacy was defined by competition with North Korea, notably for friendly votes in the United Nations on issues of importance to each country. In Africa at this time, most newly independent countries had nationalist, anti-Western, and socialist tendencies under the influence of colonial rule, so North Korea held a superior position in African diplomacy than South Korea. By 1975 however, that gap had diminished as North Korea had only two more diplomatic relations with countries than South Korea. It wasn't until the late 1970s that North Korean diplomatic missions in Africa had no notable supremacy over South Korea's diplomatic missions.

=== 1980 Africa-South Korea relations ===
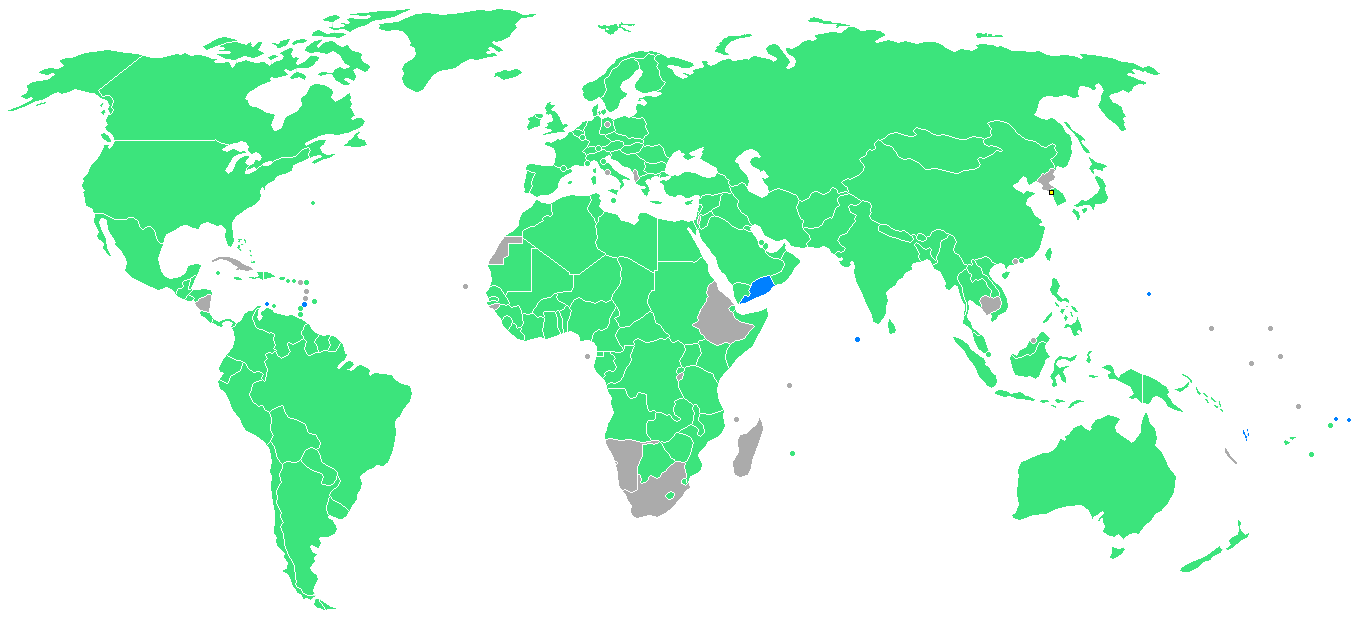
Countries that participated in the 1988 Seoul Summer Olympics (in green)

In the 1980s, Korea began aggressive diplomatic activities by signing various agreements with various African countries. In particular, in 1982 to host the 1988 Seoul Olympics, South Korean President Chun Doo-hwan was the first president to visit African countries in; Kenya, Nigeria, Gabon, and Senegal for expanding South Korea's diplomatic influences From this point on, Korea dispatched delegations and diplomats to the African continent and started practical economic and technological cooperation. These diplomatic strategies toward Africa led to enough support for the 1988 Seoul Olympics.

=== 1990 Africa-South Korea relations ===
From the 1990s, South Korea's African diplomacy changed from competition with North Korea to focusing on a profit-based system South Korean government set a strategy to recognize Africa as potential source of natural resources. This is seen as a result of the end of the Cold War that began in 1990 and the simultaneous accession of the two Koreas to become members of the United Nations in 1991.

=== 2000 Africa-South Korea relations ===
Since the 2000s, African relations became more important in the eyes of South Korean leaders, and more active diplomatic activities began as a result. When the African Union was established on July 9, 2002, South Korea was interested in gaining access to an attractive market of 1.3 billion people, wanting close relations with the African Union. In April 2005, South Korea obtained the Observer State status to the African Union. In order to maintain their advantageous position, the South Korean government established a Korean government-led initiative for African development with five primary values:

Flag of the African Union

Map of the African Union with suspended states highlighted in light green

1) Expand Official Development Assistance (ODA) to Africa

2) Invite international students from across the African continent to transfer to South Korea for advanced technologies studies

3) Expand medical and health support for infectious diseases

4) Expand trade with the countries of Africa

5) Regularly hold a South Korea-Africa Forum.

During this period, South Korea had achieved diplomatic ties with all African countries.

=== 2010 and onwards – contemporary Africa-South Korea relations ===
Since the 2010s, the importance of Africa's enormous resources has been highlighted to South Korea, and investment from the private sphere and national projects began in earnest. As of 2022, the Korean government is expanding investment and support for Africa. The African Union officially launched a free trade zone within member African countries with the goal of achieving a single market of 1.3 billion Africans, and the US, Russia, China, and Japan are already fiercely competing in Africa for the strategic importance of Africa. South Korea has also allocated funds to foreign aid during this time, such as through a series of pacts in 2016 with Kenya. In order to keep up with the competitive market trend, the South Korea-Africa Foundation was established by the South Korean government in 2018 and cooperation with Africa is being expanded. The Covid-19 Pandemic has also influenced relations between South Korea and Africa, such as with donations and aid coming in the form of medical supplies. Currently, there are 25 Korean embassies in 24 African countries.

== Political relations ==
=== Before the Cold War ===
There were no meaningful political exchanges between Africa and South Korea until the Cold War era.

=== During the Cold War ===
Official exchanges between Korea and African countries began with the participation of Ethiopia and South Africa in the Korean War. In particular, from the late 1950s, African countries began to gain the status of independent countries from the former colonial rule, and most countries became independent in the 1960s. However, there were many cases in which most countries accepted the Soviet Union, communist bloc, and socialist ideology. In the 1960s North Korea was a more developed country than South Korea, so North Korea attempted to expand its political and ideological influence by providing aid to African countries. As a result, political relations between South Korea and African countries were significantly affected by the ideological situation during the Cold War. South Korea focused on political ties among African countries with Gabon and Ethiopia. Gabon was the only actual partner African country because of Ethiopia's rebels. In the case of South Africa, due to apartheid, South Korea did not move forward the political ties. However, through the rapid growth of South Korea since the 1970s and the expansion of intensive diplomatic outreach in Africa, South Korea gained enough political support from most African countries to hold the 1988 Seoul Olympics.

=== After the Cold War ===
After the collapse of the Soviet Union, the political solidarity between South Korea and African countries was further expanded, and this increased with the expansion of diplomatic ties as well. President Roh Tae-woo of South Korea launched aggressive diplomatic relations with former socialist and communist African countries in the past which called Nordpolitik in South Korea. This policy has contributed significantly to establishing diplomatic ties with currently 48 African countries. After the Cold War, it has been evaluated as a political victory for South Korea on the African continent.

=== Present ===
Up to the current day, the South Korean government has established a national institution called KOICA. This institution aims to stabilize domestic politics in Africa and cooperate with the international community for Africa's development. In particular, to secure an edge in competition with China and Japan, South Korean politicians have done their best to ensure a sizable budget for KOICA.

== Economic relations ==
=== Economic development and exchanges between African countries, South Korea, and Asia ===
The Four Asian Tigers

Upon their time of independence, many viewed African and South East Asian countries as similar in terms of economic conditions and relative economic standing to each other. The decline of the world economy, rising oil prices, and political instability in the 1970s made Africa the poorest continent in the world. In contrast, during the same period, East Asia achieved what's widely considered to be remarkable growth. In particular, South Korea has been called one of the Four Asian Tigers and has successfully developed various industries. African countries in the 1970s tended to have economic systems that were dependent on basic industry due to the lack of capital, technology, experience, management ability, and corruption, although they had enormous natural resources. During the 1960s and 70s, South Korea saw potential for an African export market, however it was in the 1990s that Africa's growth potential began to draw attention, and the perception of the African market began to change into a market of new opportunities. South Korea also recognized the potential of Africa and announced the "South Korea Initiative for African Development" in March 2006 and started development and national investment. However, South Korea's entry into Africa was a late start compared to China and Japan. Furthermore, South Korea tends to focus their economic relationships with certain African countries above others.

African-Chinese diplomacy is currently China's core national strategy, aggressively securing Africa's resources. Unlike South Korea, which started developing stronger African relations at the government level in 2006, China had already successfully held the China-Africa Cooperation Forum in Beijing on November 4, 2006, and 48 African leaders participated; regular economic exchanges continue to expand to this day. As a result, China's total trade with Africa in 2021 reached a record high of $254.3 billion, an increase of 35.3% compared to 2020. In particular, China is particularly investing in South Africa (US$54.1 billion), Nigeria (US$25.6 billion), Angola (US$23.3 billion), Egypt (US$19.9 billion), and Congo (US$14.3 billion), focusing on transportation, infrastructure, and mining.

In the case of Japan, since 1993 the African Development Conference has been held every five years, maintaining close cooperation with African countries. On May 29, 2006, Japanese Prime Minister Koizumi visited Ethiopia, where the African Union headquarters is located, in an attempt to strengthen Japan's advance into the African market. In the present day, Japan's five major Zaibatsu companies (part of Japan's unique corporate system) are seeking to expand private exchanges with the support of its own government towards the African market.

As can be seen in Japan and China's case, South Korea's economic interactions with Africa are relatively smaller than other major Asian nations.

=== South Korean Development Model ===
In recent years, economic relations between Africa and South Korea have maintained a close relationship by transmitting South Korea's growth model rather than just focusing on trade or investment. African countries have bench marked a growth model of South Korea. This South Korean development model led a national leap from the least developed country to a developed country in the world within 70 years In particular, Algeria is in the process of sending remarkable numbers of international students at the government level to learn about South Korea's high-growth model. Algeria seeks its own development by strengthening ties with South Korea to be a significant country in the area of North Africa. Similarly, South Africa is also benchmarking the growth model of South Korea and their 70s and 80s Sae-maul strategies while continuing cooperation. Not all African countries attempt to copy any of the East Asian Tiger's models however, and those who do take different lessons and strategies from these models. Furthermore, opposition to many of these models are present in African countries and vary depending on the country's past history and current conditions.

=== Trade ===
African countries and South Korea's trade is still relatively small compared to the size of their economies.

=== Humanitarian efforts / aid and loans / peacekeeping efforts ===
United Nations Peacekeeping Helmet Icon

As a UN peacekeeper, the South Korean government has dispatched troops to Africa several times for peace.

=== Somalia, civilian protection and food aid from civil war ===
July 30, 1993 – March 18, 1994

Western Sahara region: As a UN peacekeeper, provide medical assistance to civilians in the region.

August 9, 1994, to May 15, 2006

Angola: After the civil war, as a UN peacekeeping force, an engineer battalion was dispatched to restore major walkways and facilities.

October 5, 1995, to December 23, 1996

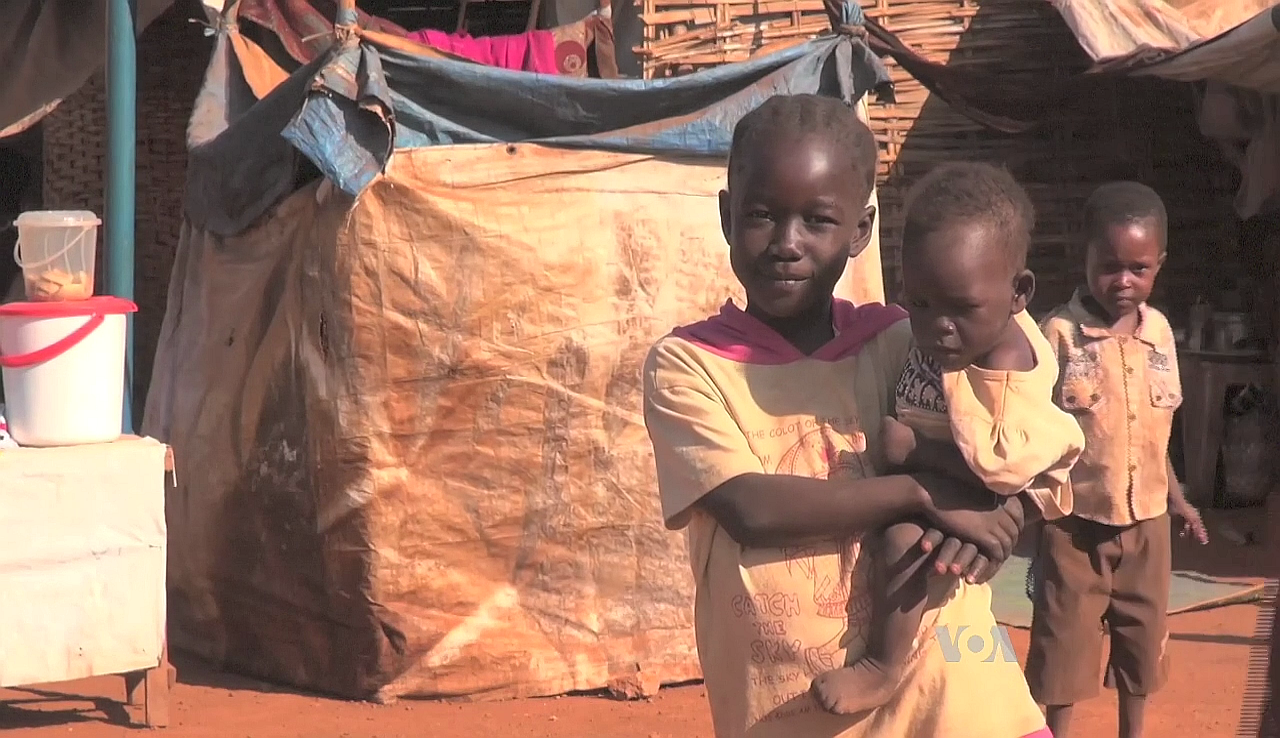
South Sudan refugees

Somalia: Activities to protect international ships passing through the Somalia Straits from Somali pirates

March 13, 2009, to the present.

South Sudan: Medical and engineering battalion as a UN peacekeeping force for national reconstruction after a long civil war

March 31, 2013, to the present.

== KOICA ==
=== Development project ===
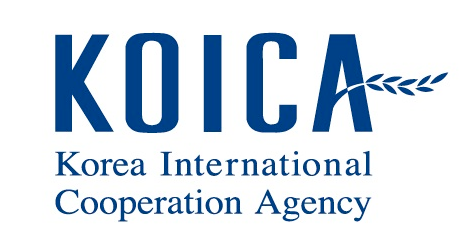
KOICA logo

As a national institution that aims for Africa's development, KOICA has been steadily conducting cooperation and projects with Africa since establishing the first Africa strategy in 2012. Based on the South Korean government's African development policy, partner African country's development policy, and international community policy, KOICA establishes strategy and implements a national support plan for Africa. According to their website, their core values are people, peace, prosperity, and the planet. KOICA is continuing its cooperation by dividing Africa into three regions to better serve the needs of each region. First is the North African region; second is the Central West African region of southern Sahara; and third is the Southeast African region. In particular, 16 key investment countries have been selected by region and supported by priority. Their major projects include:

- The promotion of African women's and human rights.
- The expansion of the health care system in Africa
- Support for vocational and technical education in order to achieve sustainable development.

Through this, KOICA states that it is striving for the prosperity of both countries' relations while passing on South Korean technology and advanced systems.

In 2020, a new African strategy was established by revising the first African strategy, which was launched in 2012. A new development project was made by reflecting the current situation in African.

KOICA designed their new project that re-systemize the national governance system with IT technologies, and this is being implemented with priority from key African countries. Egypt, Morocco, Algeria, and Tunisia in Northern Africa have been selected and KOICA is aiming their project's result to made these nations become a high-middle-income country. In the case of Nigeria, Senegal, Ghana, and Cameroon in the Midwest, investments are continuing with the goal of national growth, economic prosperity, and job opportunities. Lastly, Mozambique, Ethiopia, Rwanda, Tanzania, Uganda, and Kenya in the southeast region are providing intensive support to reduce unemployment rate and develop human resources.

KOICA is aiming for the sustainable cooperation with African Union's development policy. Based on an analysis of each nation's differences, KOICA wants to provide customized cooperation and support for each African region. Lastly, KOICA wants to strengthen partnerships with the international community so that African-led development can proceed actively. Through these continuous efforts by KOICA, the South Korean government wants to develop mutually beneficial relations between each African country and South Korea. Like South Korea, which became a donor country after being aid recipient after the Korean War, African countries similarly desire to become a donor country and become a responsible member of the international community.

Due to its own transition from a primarily agricultural country to a highly urbanised technologically advanced one, South Korea's own soft diplomacy has taken the form of funding and assistance for certain African countries under its K-Ricebelt Project.

== South Korea's foreign relations with African countries ==
- Algeria–South Korea relations
- Angola–South Korea relations
- Benin–South Korea relations
- Botswana–South Korea relations
- Burkina Faso–South Korea relations
- Burundi–South Korea relations
- Cameroon–South Korea relations
- Cape Verde–South Korea relations
- Central African Republic–South Korea relations
- Chad–South Korea relations
- Comoros–South Korea relations
- Democratic Republic of the Congo–South Korea relations
- Republic of the Congo–South Korea relations
- Djibouti–South Korea relations
- Egypt–South Korea relations
- Equatorial Guinea–South Korea relations
- Eritrea–South Korea relations
- Eswatini–South Korea relations
- Ethiopia–South Korea relations
- Gabon–South Korea relations
- (The Gambia) Gambia–South Korea relations
- Ghana–South Korea relations
- Guinea–South Korea relations
- Guinea-Bissau–South Korea relations
- Ivory Coast–South Korea relations
- Kenya–South Korea relations
- Lesotho–South Korea relations
- Liberia–South Korea relations
- Libya–South Korea relations
- Madagascar–South Korea relations
- Malawi–South Korea relations
- Mali–South Korea relations
- Mauritania–South Korea relations
- Mauritius–South Korea relations
- Morocco–South Korea relations
- Mozambique–South Korea relations
- Namibia–South Korea relations
- Niger–South Korea relations
- Nigeria–South Korea relations
- Rwanda–South Korea relations
- São Tomé and Príncipe–South Korea relations
- Senegal–South Korea relations
- Seychelles–South Korea relations
- Sierra Leone–South Korea relations
- Somalia–South Korea relations
- South Africa–South Korea relations
- South Korea–South Sudan relations
- South Korea–Sudan relations
- South Korea–Tanzania relations
- South Korea–Togo relations
- South Korea–Tunisia relations
- South Korea–Uganda relations
- South Korea–Zambia relations
- South Korea–Zimbabwe relations

== See also ==
- Foreign relations of South Korea
- Indo-Pacific Strategy of South Korea
- Korea-Africa Foundation
- Africa–North Korea relations
