= Egypt–Korea relations =

Egypt–Korea relations may refer to:

- Egypt–North Korea relations
- Egypt–South Korea relations
