= Korea-Africa Foundation =

South Korean government organization

- Founded: 2018
- Type: Non-profit Public Diplomacy Organization
- Location: 4th Floor, Diplomatic Center Bldg, 2558 Nambusunhwan-ro, Seocho-gu, Seoul 06750, South Korea
- Region served: Worldwide
- President: Youngchae Kim
- Website: k-af.or.kr/main-page.asp

- Korea-Africa Foundation
- Hangul: 한·아프리카재단
- Hanja: 韓·아프리카財團
- RR: Han·Apeurika jaedan
- MR: Han·Ap'ŭrik'a chaedan

The Korea-Africa Foundation (Korean: 한·아프리카재단) is a special corporation under the Ministry of Foreign Affairs of South Korea that was launched in 2018. Its purpose is to conduct long-term and comprehensive research and analysis on African countries and to promote partnerships with African countries in various fields such as politics, economy, culture, and academia.

It was founded in 2018. Its first chairman was Choi Yeon-ho. Its second chairman was Yeo Woon-ki.

== Head of foundation ==
- Choi Yeon-ho
- Yeo Woon-ki
- Kim Youngchae

== See also ==
- Africa–South Korea relations
- Foreign relations of South Korea
- Indo-Pacific Strategy of South Korea
- Foreign policy of the Yoon Suk Yeol government
