= Cho Tae-yul =

South Korean Foreign Minister (born 1955)

- 조태열
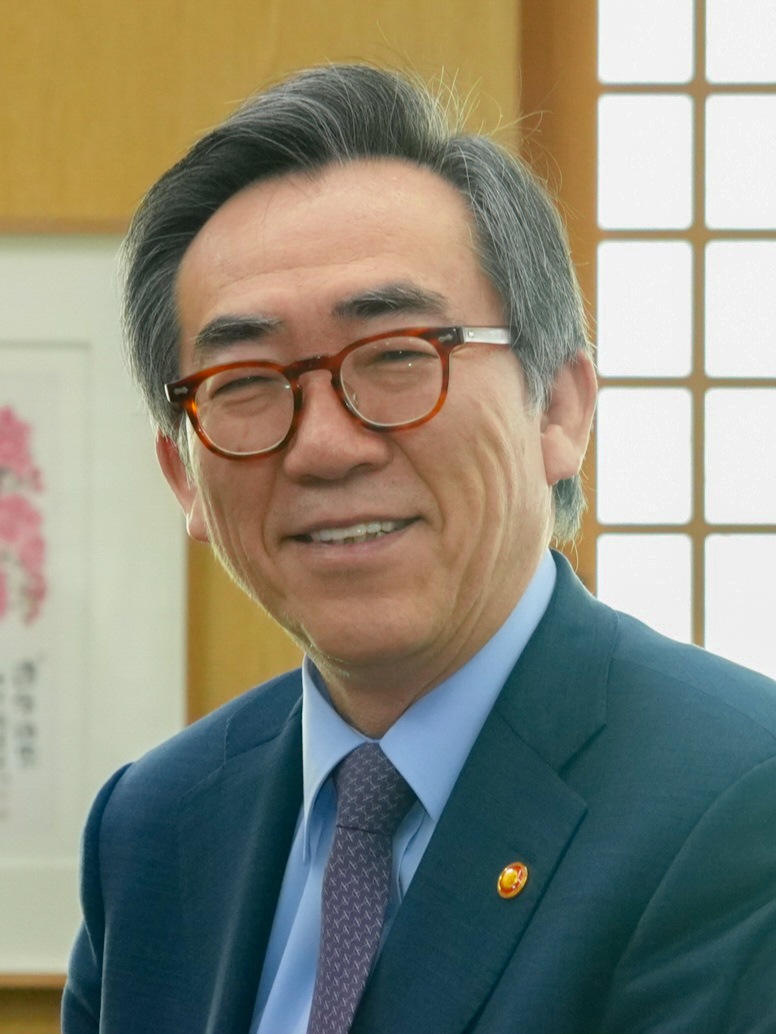
- Cho in 2024

41st Minister of Foreign Affairs
- In office 10 January 2024 – 18 July 2025
- President: Yoon Suk Yeol; Han Duck-soo (Acting); Choi Sang-mok (Acting); Lee Ju-ho (Acting); Lee Jae Myung
- Prime Minister: Han Duck-soo; Lee Ju-ho; Kim Min-seok
- Preceded by: Park Jin
- Succeeded by: Cho Hyun

Personal details
- Born: 9 November 1955 (age 70) Yeongyang, North Gyeongsang Province
- Party: Independent
- Parent: Cho Chi-hun (father)
- Education: Seoul National University (LLB)

Korean name
- Hangul: 조태열
- Hanja: 趙兌烈
- RR: Jo Taeyeol
- MR: Cho T'aeyŏl

Cho Tae-yul (Korean: 조태열; born 10 November 1955) is a South Korean diplomat who served as the minister of foreign affairs from 2024 to 2025.

== Education ==
Cho graduated from Seoul National University in 1979 with a Bachelor of Laws degree. In 1983, Cho completed the Foreign Service Programme at the University of Oxford.

== Career ==
Cho joined the Ministry of Foreign Affairs in 1979, where he served in the overseas missions in Thailand, the United States, and Saudi Arabia until the 1990s.

Cho served as the South Korean ambassador to Spain in 2008 and South Korean Permanent Representative to the United Nations from 2016 to 2019. He served as the Second Vice Foreign Minister from 2013 to 2016 during the Park Geun-hye government.

He had also served as the chairman of the World Trade Organization Dispute Committee and, the chairman of the Geneva Government Procurement Committee.

== Foreign Minister ==
On 19 December 2023, President Yoon Suk Yeol appointed Cho Tae-yul as the nominee for Foreign Minister to succeed Minister Park Jin, who decided to run in 2024 South Korean legislative election. The presidential office said that his diplomatic insight and experience will greatly contribute to resolving various diplomatic issues facing the country.

Cho and Chinese Foreign Minister Wang Yi held a telephone conversation in February 2024 to discuss issues of mutual interest, including a wide range of aspects of bilateral relations, such as high-level exchanges and supply chain cooperation.

In September 2024, he said at the General Debate of the 79th UN General Assembly that amid conflicts including Russia's war in Ukraine and Gaza war, skepticism about the role of the fragmented the United Nations and other multilateral mechanisms has deepened. He also cited the AI Seoul Summit as an example, saying that South Korea would play the role of a facilitator, supporter, and initiator of global peace for new norms and governance.

On 10 April 2025, Cho visited Damascus and met with Syrian Foreign Minister Asaad al-Shaibani. During the meeting, both sides signed a formal agreement to establish diplomatic relations, which included plans to open embassies and exchange diplomatic missions. The agreement made Syria the last United Nations member state, outside of North Korea, to establish diplomatic relations with South Korea.

== See also ==
- Indo-Pacific Strategy of South Korea
- Foreign policy of the Yoon Suk Yeol government

Political offices
Preceded by Park Jin	Minister of Foreign Affairs; 2024–	Succeeded by
