= Foreign policy of the Yoon Suk Yeol government =

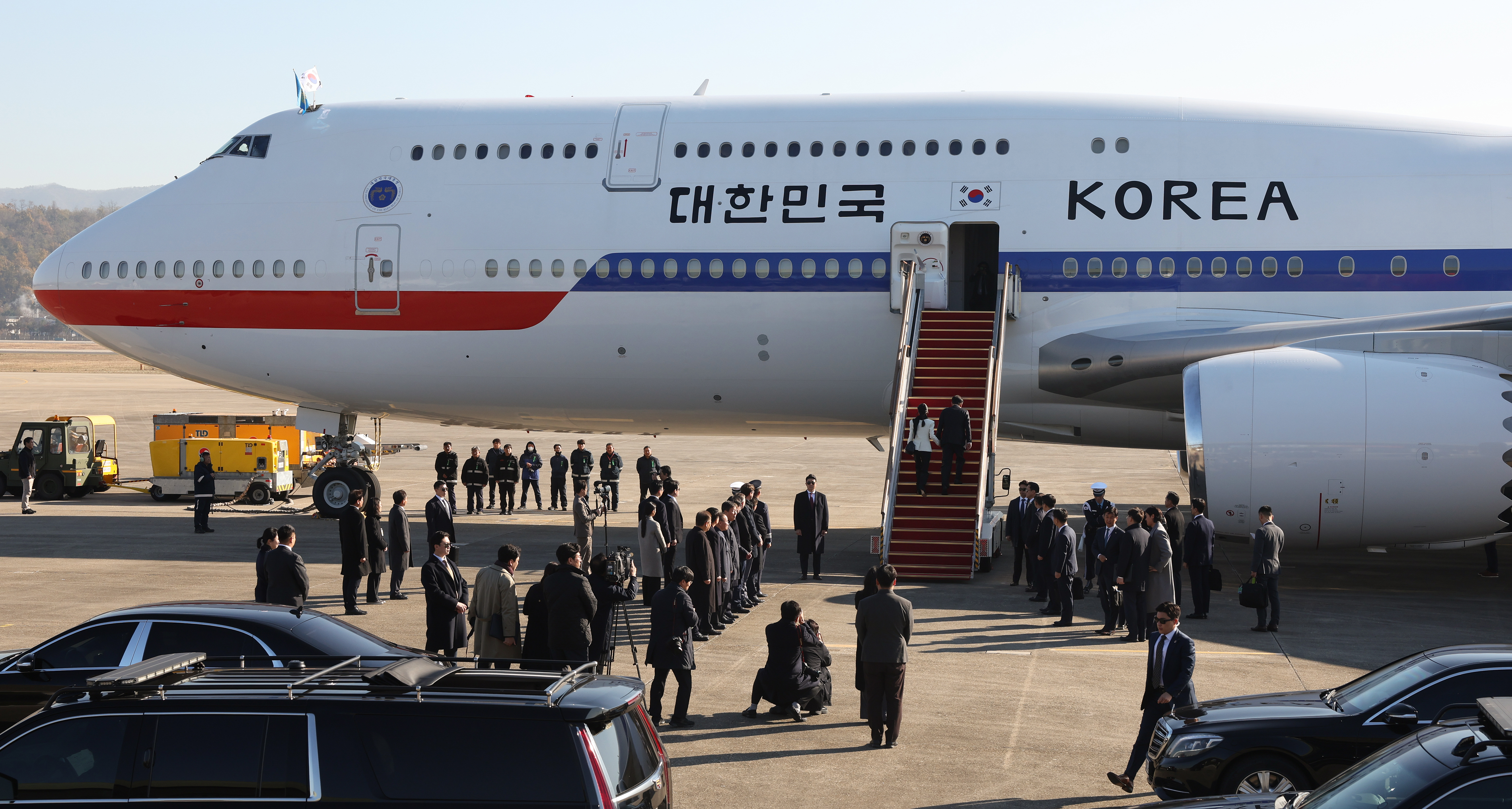
Yoon Suk Yeol departing from Seoul Airport for a state visit to the United Kingdom in November 2023

South Korean President Yoon Suk Yeol held the South Korea-Africa Summit and the Korea-Pacific Islands Summit to strengthen economic cooperation with these regions. The Indo-Pacific Strategy to strengthen solidarity with Indo-Pacific countries was also announced in the first year of his administration.

In 2023, when he visited Ukraine after the NATO Summit, the Framework Agreement on the External Economic Development Cooperation Fund was signed between the two countries. Additionally, an additional financial support package of $150 million was also announced.

== Appointments ==
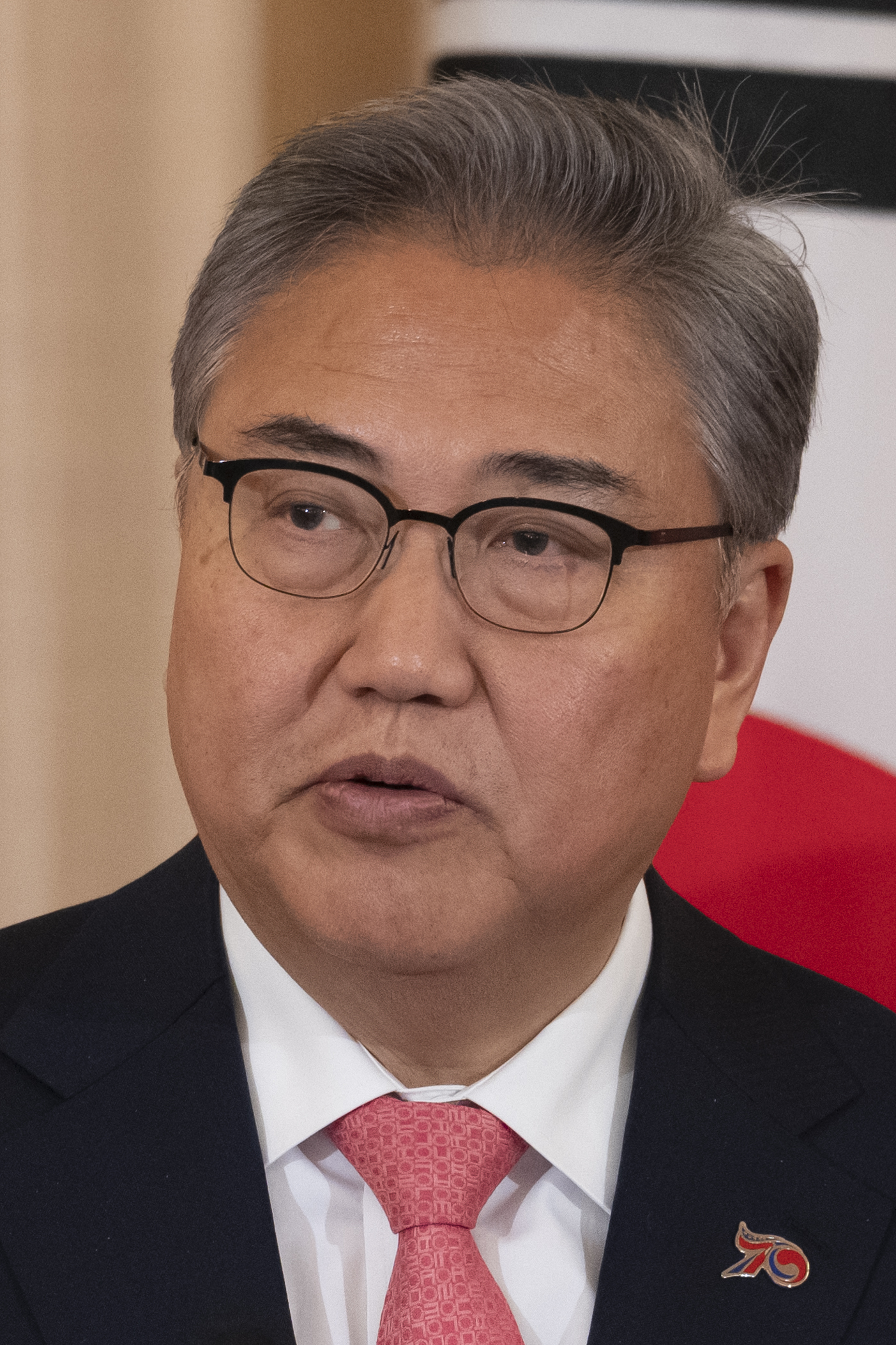
Park Jin

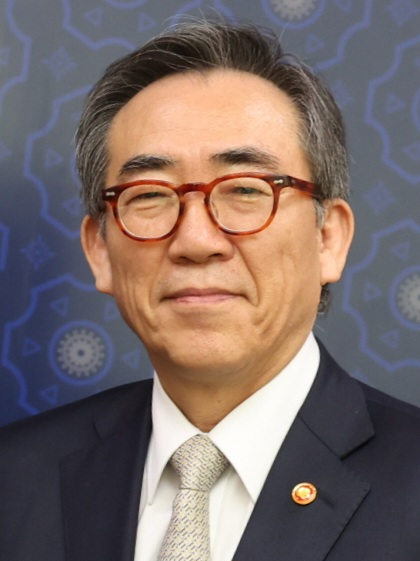
Cho Tae-yul

Cho Tae-yul, who was nominated as Minister of Foreign Affairs in 2023, has worked at the Ministry of Foreign Affairs since 1979, serving as Ambassador to the United Nations, Second Vice Minister of Foreign Affairs, and Ambassador to Spain.

== Asia ==
=== East Asia ===
==== China, Taiwan, and the South China Sea ====
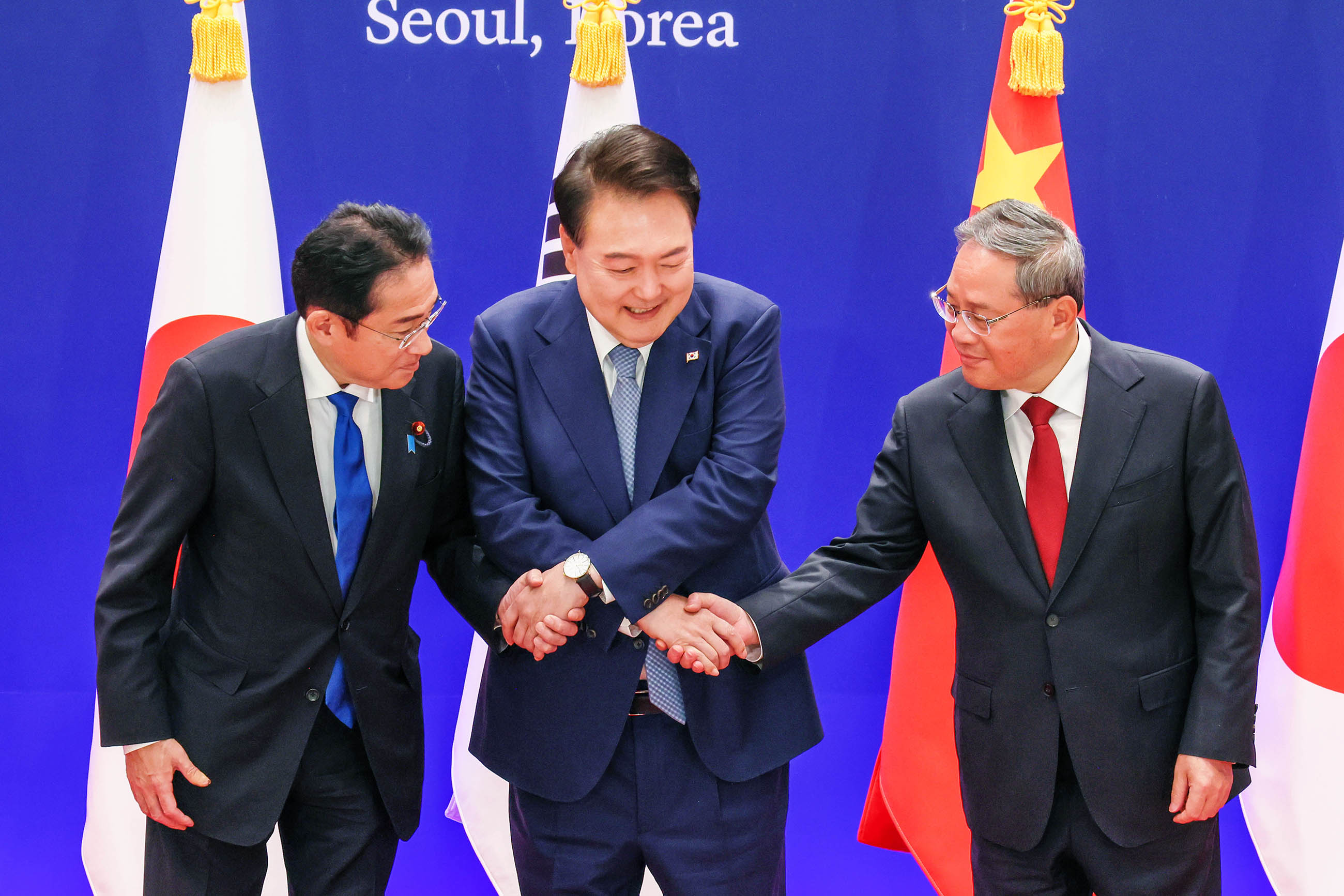
China–Japan–South Korea trilateral summit held in Seoul in 2024

In March 2023, Yoon called tensions between China and Taiwan a global problem and described the recent heightened tensions as "attempts to change the status quo by force." In response, Chinese Vice Foreign Minister Sun Weidong expressed his displeasure by telling the South Korean ambassador to make "solemn representation" China also expressed "strong dissatisfaction" with Yoon's remarks, calling them "totally unacceptable."

Before his state visit to the UK in November 2023, President Yoon pointed out the importance of peace and stability in the Taiwan Strait and rules-based maritime order in the South China Sea.

==== Japan ====
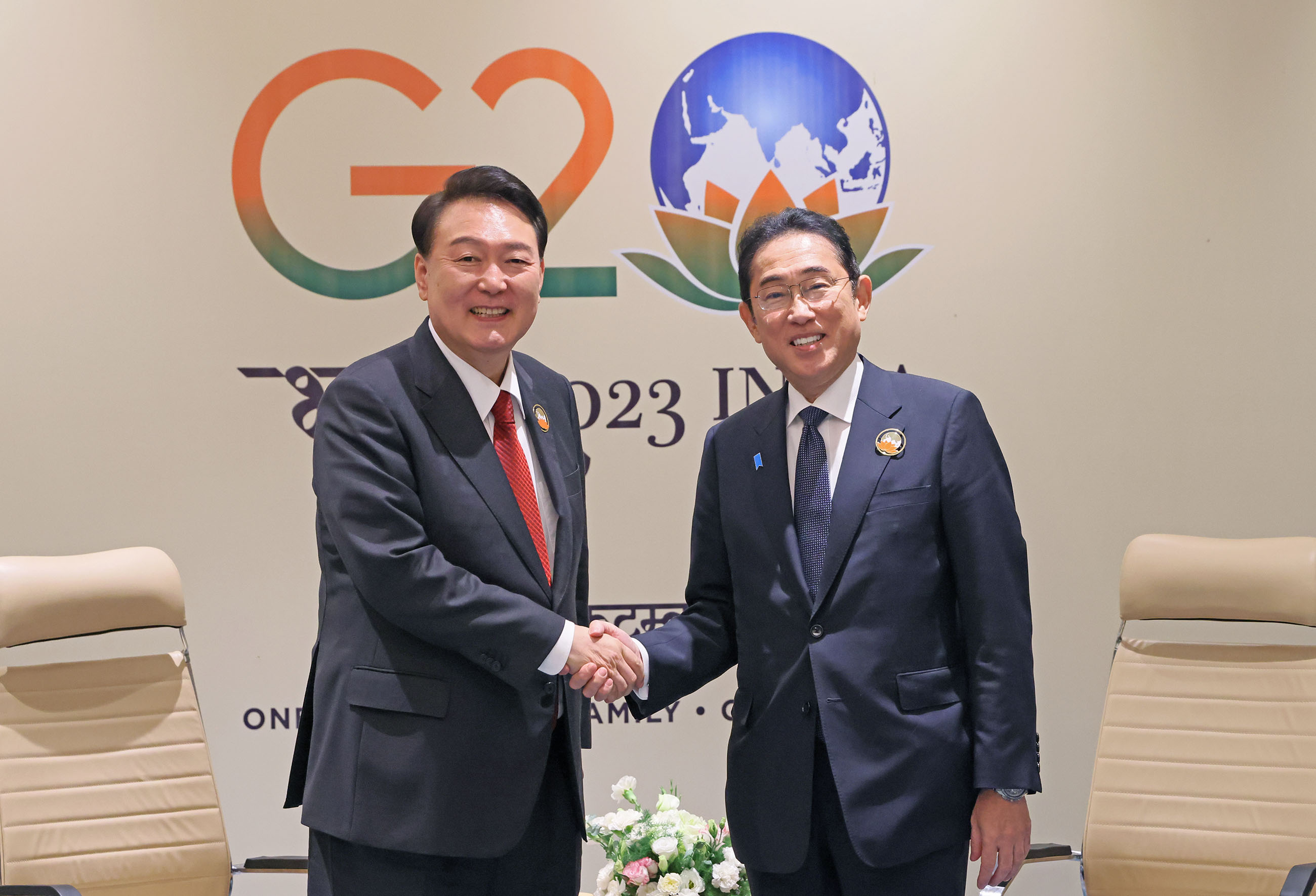
President Yoon and Japanese Prime Minister Fumio Kishida, September 2023

In March 2024, President Yoon said that South Korea and Japan are partners pursuing world peace and prosperity moving toward a new future.

==== North Korea ====
===== 2021 =====
During his election campaign in 2021, Yoon Suk Yeol said that he would ask that the United States to redeploy tactical nuclear weapons in South Korea if there is a threat from North Korea. U.S. Deputy Assistant Secretary of State for Japan and Korea Mark Lambert rejected Yoon's call, saying said the proposal was against U.S. policy.

===== 2022 =====
In November 2022, a US-South Korean air force exercise named Vigilant Storm was countered by North Korea by missile tests and an air force exercise.

===== 2023 =====
In November 2023, both the Koreas suspended the Comprehensive Agreement Pact - a pact aimed at lowering tensions between the two countries - which was signed at the September 2018 inter-Korean summit, after North Korea launched a spy satellite into space.

===== 2024 =====
On 15 January 2024, Kim Jong Un announced that peaceful reunification was no longer possible and proposed identifying South Korea as a hostile state in the North Korean constitution. It was also announced that North Korea would dissolve the Committee for the Peaceful Reunification of the Fatherland, the National Economic Cooperation Bureau and the Mount Kumgang International Tourism Administration. The Arch of Reunification in Pyongyang was subsequently demolished in January 2024.

On 4 June 2024, South Korea's State Council suspended the 2018 Panmunjom Declaration due to border tensions over balloons sent by North Korea. On 9 June 2024, South Korea announced to resume loudspeaker broadcasts of anti-North Korean propaganda after Pyongyang sent over 300 rubbish-filled balloons across the border. Seoul's military detected around 330 balloons since 8 June 2024, with about 80 found in South Korean territory. The president's office stated that the broadcasts aimed to deliver messages of hope to the North Korean military and citizens. This response followed weeks of activists in the South launching balloons carrying K-pop, dollar bills, and anti-Kim Jong Un propaganda, which had infuriated Pyongyang. The loudspeaker broadcasts resumed after South Korea suspended a 2018 tension-easing agreement, allowing for propaganda campaigns and potential military exercises near the border.

South Korea announced it would deploy laser weapons in 2024 to shoot down North Korean drones, becoming the first country to do so. Developed with Hanwha Aerospace, these inexpensive and invisible lasers enhance defense capabilities by burning down drone engines within seconds. The move follows a December 2023 incident where North Korean drones entered South Korean airspace.

On 26 August 2024, North Korea revealed a new "suicide drone," with Kim Jong Un overseeing tests, according to state media. These drones, possibly acquired from Russia and strongly resembling the ZALA Lancet, are capable of striking targets on land and sea, raising security concerns for South Korea.

On 13 October 2024, North Korea threatened South Korea with 'severe consequences' if drones entered Pyongyang's airspace again, following accusations of recent drone activity. Although South Korea's defense minister refuted these claims, the Joint Chiefs of Staff stated they couldn't fully verify the incidents.

On 15 October 2024, North Korea destroyed the road connecting North and South Korea. South Korea predicts that North Korea intends to demonstrate a complete severance between the two Koreas. However, given that South Korea provided $125 million to North Korea for the construction of this road, South Korea is considering demanding repayment from North Korea.

On 24 October 2024, North Korean balloons carrying propaganda leaflets targeting South Korean President Yoon Suk Yeol and First Lady Kim Keon Hee were found in Seoul, amid rising tensions between the two Koreas.

On 11 December 2024, North Korea released its first statements on the martial law declaration through an article published in the state newspaper Rodong Sinmun, describing it as an "insane act" that was "akin to the coup d'état of the decades-ago military dictatorship era". It also described the incident "revealed the weakness in South Korean society" and hinted at the end of Yoon's political career. The newspaper also published images of anti-Yoon protests in Seoul.

===== 2025 =====
On 28 February 2025, North Korean leader Kim Jong Un oversaw a strategic cruise missile test and ordered full nuclear readiness, state media reported. The test aimed to demonstrate the country's nuclear capabilities in response to perceived threats. While cruise missiles are not banned under U.N. resolutions, North Korea continues to face sanctions for its ballistic missile and nuclear programs. This test occurred as Kim emphasized military loyalty and training, continuing his hostile rhetoric toward South Korea and the U.S. despite past diplomatic engagements.

North Korea continued to criticize the joint military drills between South Korea and the United States, particularly the "Freedom Shield" exercises that began on 10 March and ran until 20 March. North Korea condemned these drills, viewing them as provocative and worsening tensions on the Korean Peninsula. In response, North Korea launched multiple ballistic missiles on 10 March, with state media claiming that these exercises would deteriorate the situation.

North Korea also appeared close to completing its first airborne early warning aircraft, a significant military development that would enhance its surveillance capabilities.

=== South Asia ===
==== India ====
At a bilateral meeting held at the 2023 G20 New Delhi summit in September 2023, Yoon and Indian Prime Minister Narendra Modi agreed that the two countries would strengthen defense and space cooperation to strengthen strategic relations in the Indo-Pacific region.

In December 2023, Yoon said on X that he hopes to further strengthen the special strategic partnership with India on the 50th anniversary of the establishment of diplomatic relations with India, and that he looks forward to working with Prime Minister Modi.

=== Southeast Asia ===
==== Philippines ====
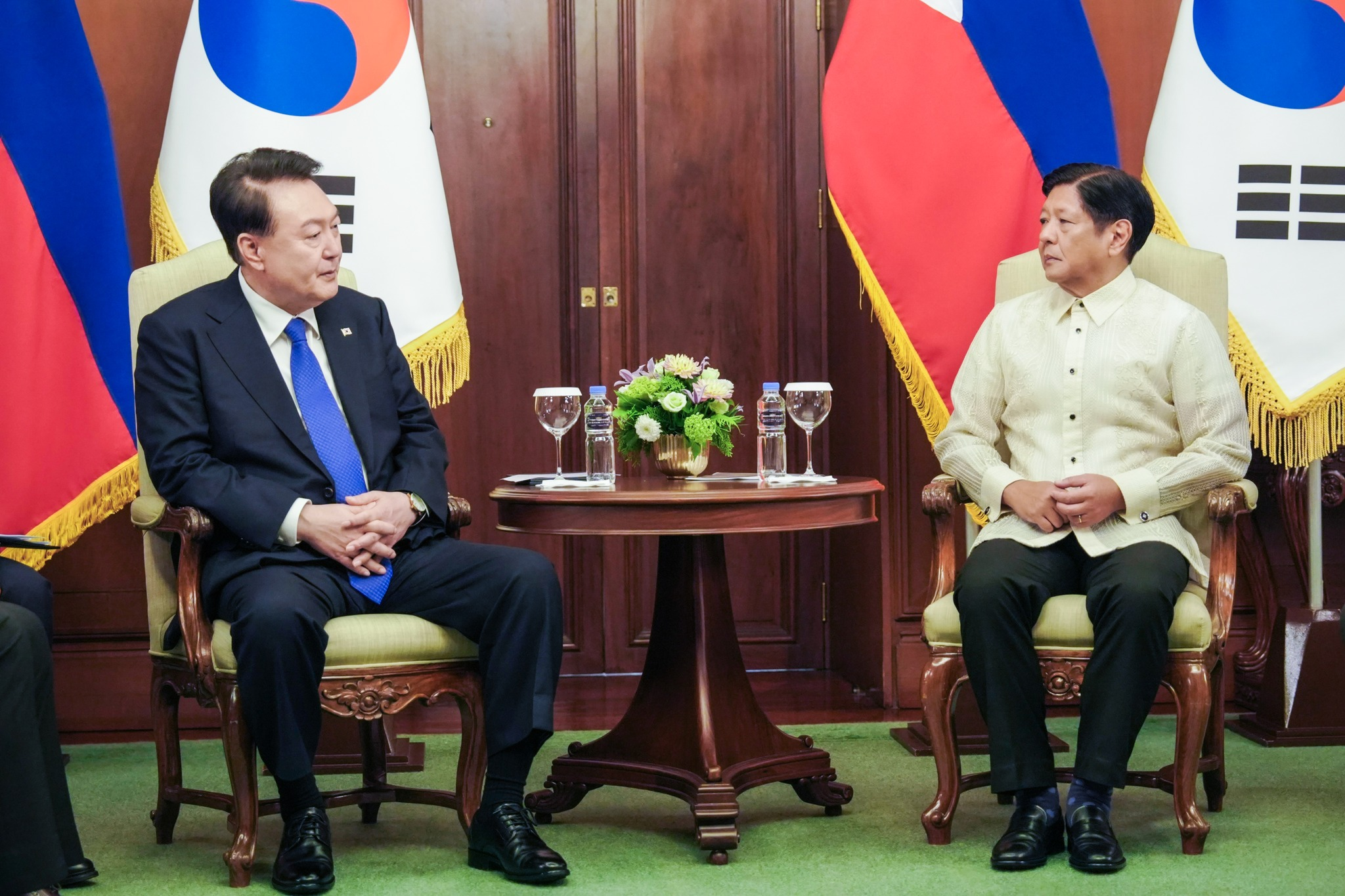
President Yoon and Philippine President Bongbong Marcos, October 2024

In November 2022, Yoon held a summit with Philippine President Bongbong Marcos and the two countries agreed to strengthen cooperation in areas such as nuclear energy, infrastructure, and national defense. Yoon asked Marcos to provide support for South Korean companies to participate in various infrastructure projects being planned in the Philippines.

In September 2023, the South Korea-Philippines Free Trade Agreement was signed in Jakarta, Indonesia. As a result, the 5% tariff imposed on South Korean automobiles will be abolished as soon as the FTA takes effect, and the up to 30% tariff imposed on automobile parts will be abolished within 5 years.

In March 2024, the Yoon administration criticized China's use of water cannons against Philippine vessels in the South China Sea.

In October 2024, Yoon paid a two-day state visit to the Philippines at the invitation of President Marcos in commemoration of the 75th anniversary of diplomatic relations. The two leaders agreed to upgrade their bilateral relations to a strategic partnership. They also agreed to increase cooperation between their coast guards "in order to establish a rules-based maritime order and for the freedom of navigation and overflight pursuant to the principles of international law in the South China Sea".

=== Central Asia ===
From July 10 to 16, 2024, Yoon visited Turkmenistan, Kazakhstan, and Uzbekistan. It was part of diplomatic efforts to strengthen economic ties with resource-rich countries amid uncertainty in global supply chains. Yoon introduced the K-Silk Road initiative, which focuses on creating a new cooperation model by linking South Korea's innovative capabilities with Central Asia's abundant resources and development potential.

== Europe ==
=== France ===
In November 2023, Yoon had breakfast and had a summit meeting with French President Emmanuel Macron at the Elysee Palace. The two countries agreed to strengthen cooperation on advanced technology and climate change issues. Strengthening cooperation in the development of new and renewable energy, including future high-tech industries, climate change, coal phase-out, and energy transition, was heavily discussed.

=== United Kingdom ===
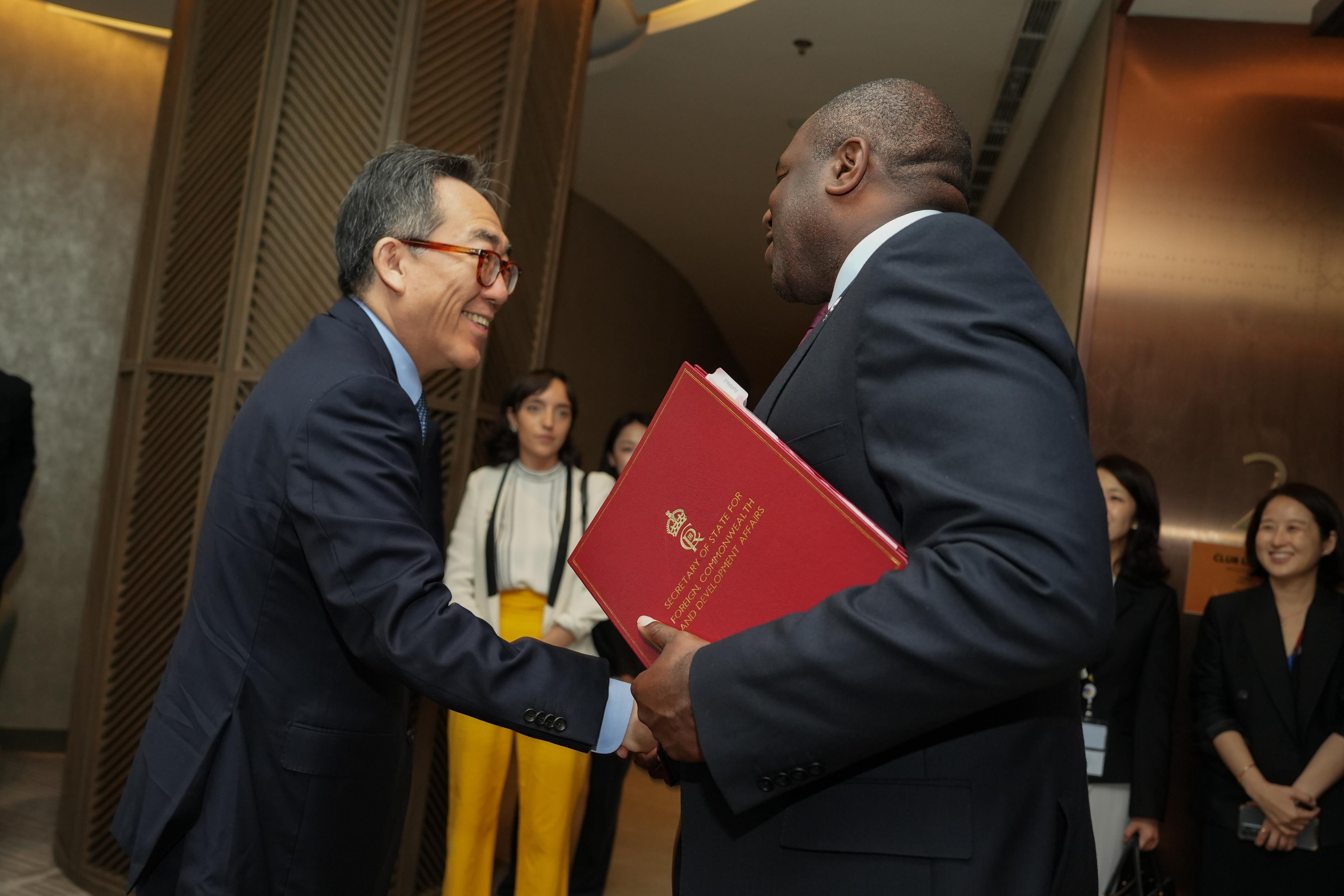
South Korean Foreign Minister Cho Tae-yul and the UK Foreign Secretary David Lammy, July 2024

In November 2023, Yoon made a state visit to the United Kingdom to commemorate the 140th anniversary of the establishment of diplomatic relations between South Korea and the UK. In his speech to both houses of Parliament, Yoon emphasized the importance of comprehensive relations between the two countries. He said both countries face geopolitical risks, including the Russian invasion of Ukraine and the Gaza war.

"Together, we will build a free and open international order. Together, we will cultivate sustainable growth and prosperity for all of humanity."

— Yoon Suk Yeol

=== Denmark ===
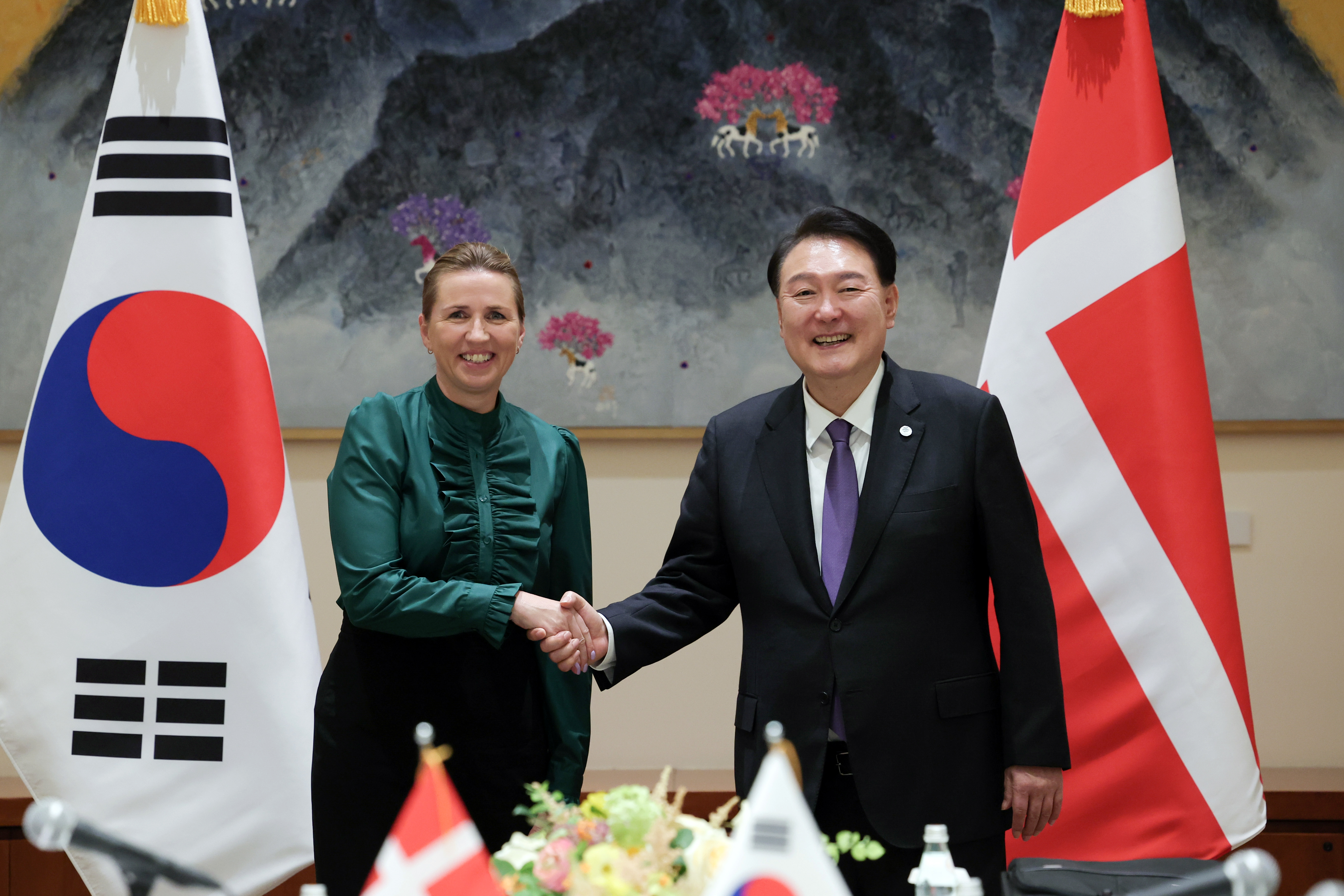
President Yoon and Danish Prime Minister Mette Frederiksen, September 2023

In September 2023, Yoon mentioned strengthening green growth cooperation between the two countries during a meeting with Danish Prime Minister Mette Frederiksen. Frederiksen called for expanded cooperation to include areas such as offshore wind, eco-friendly shipping, sustainable agriculture, and even quantum technologies.

=== Russia ===
In June 2024, as part of a Russian state visit to North Korea, the two countries signed a mutual defense pact. Following this, South Korea stated it would consider supplying Ukraine with military equipment. Putin warned South Korea not to provide military support to Ukraine, or he would make "decisions which are unlikely to please the current leadership of South Korea". On June 22, South Korea summoned Russia's ambassador to protest the mutual defense pact.

South Korea has called in the Russian ambassador to express strong concerns over North Korea allegedly sending troops to support Russia in Ukraine, labeling it a breach of UN resolutions. Reports indicate that North Korean special forces have been trained in Russia, with footage emerging of them receiving military uniforms.

In December 2024, the Financial Times reported that leaked Russian documents outlined plans for Russia to attack South Korea in the event of a wider conflict.

=== Ukraine ===
In 2023, when Yoon visited Ukraine after the 2023 NATO Summit, the Framework Agreement on the External Economic Development Cooperation Fund was signed between the two countries. Additionally, an additional financial support package of $150 million was also announced.

In July 2024, at the 2024 NATO Summit, South Korea announced plans to double its NATO trust fund contribution to Ukraine to $24 million in 2025.

== Americas ==
=== United States ===
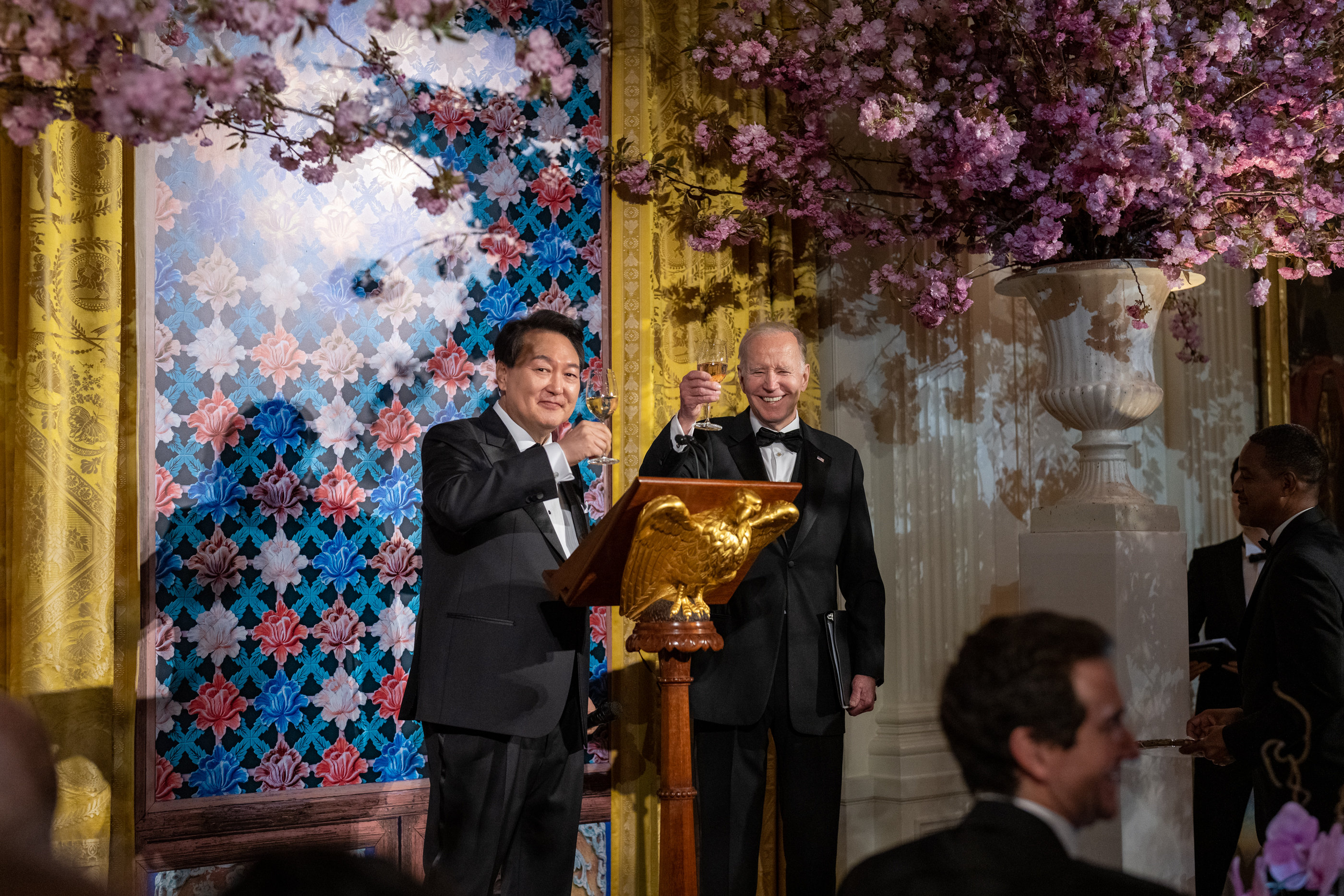
United States President Joe Biden and President Yoon, April 2023

The Yoon administration expanded the Korea-United States alliance to technology and supply chain cooperation as strategic competition between the US and China intensified. Yoon visited the United States four times in 2023, including a state visit to the United States in April 2023, the US-South Korea-Japan summit at Camp David in August 2023, the United Nations General Assembly in New York in September, and the APEC Summit in San Francisco in November.

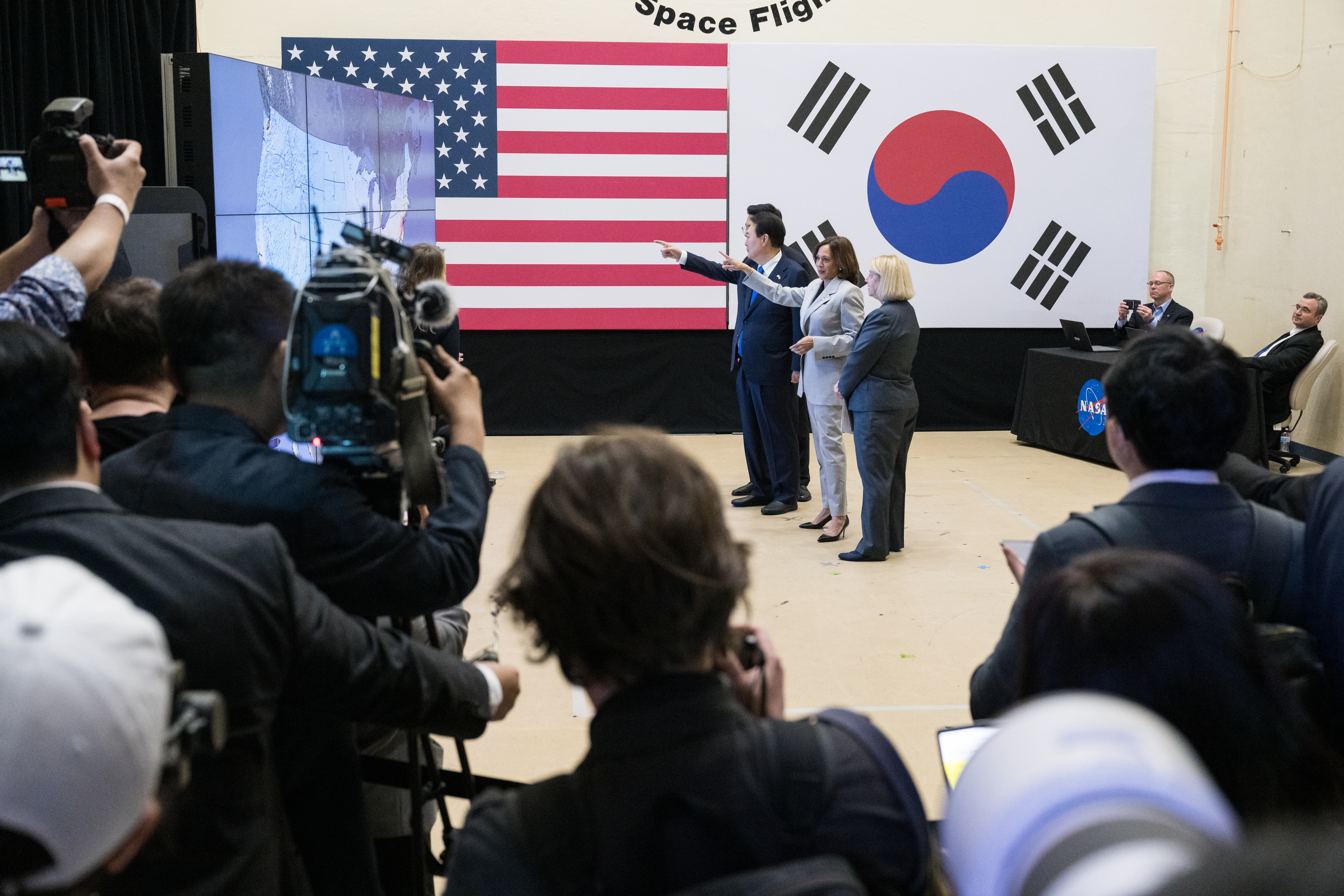
United States Vice President Kamala Harris and Yoon, April 2023

In April 2023, Yoon visited the Goddard Space Flight Center with U.S. Vice President, Kamala Harris, and agreed to work to strengthen the space alliance between South Korea and the United States. "We renew our commitment to strengthen our cooperation in the next frontier of our expanding alliance, and of course that is space," Harris said at a joint news conference with Yoon.

=== Canada ===
From May 16 to 18 2023, Trudeau travelled to Seoul to meet with President Yoon Suk-yeol. In May 2023, Yoon showed his will to strengthen cooperation with Canada, saying that there is great potential for economic cooperation between South Korea and Canada in the fields of clean energy and future industries including semiconductors, batteries, and artificial intelligence.

In 2023, the two countries began their inaugural high-level economic security dialogue.

== Africa ==
Yoon said at the Korea-Africa Business Summit that South Korea will build important mineral partnerships with major African countries to develop the continent's resources in a mutually beneficial way. In addition, the Korea-Africa Summit promoted Korea-Africa relations by adopting a joint declaration on economic cooperation and agreeing to start a ministerial-level mineral dialogue.

"We [South Korea and Africa] hope to expand mutually beneficial resource cooperation by establishing the Critical Minerals Partnership with major African countries."

— President Yoon's keynote speech at the Korea-Africa Business Summit

== NATO ==
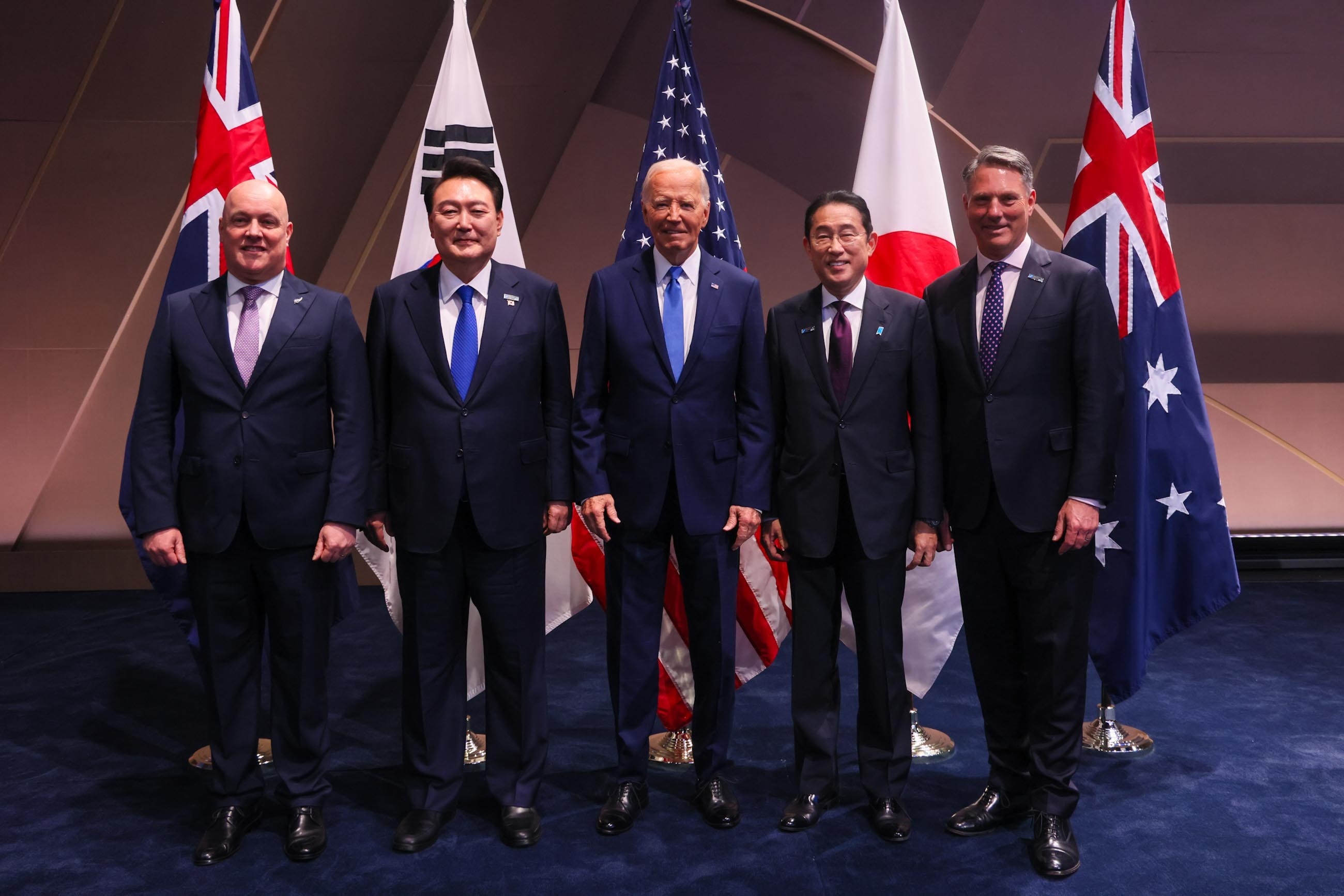
From left, New Zealand Prime Minister Christopher Luxon, Yoon, U.S. President Joe Biden, Japanese Prime Minister Fumio Kishida, and Australian Deputy Prime Minister Richard Marles

Yoon has been attending North Atlantic Treaty Organization summit meetings since his inauguration. South Korea is one of NATO global partners. The NATO summits that President Yoon attended are as follows:

Year	Country	Host leader
2022	Spain	Prime Minister Pedro Sánchez
2023	Lithuania	President Gitanas Nausėda
2024	United States	President Joe Biden

== See also ==
- Yoon Suk Yeol
- Indo-Pacific Strategy of South Korea
- List of international presidential trips made by Yoon Suk Yeol
- International relations since 1989
