= North Korea–Syria relations =

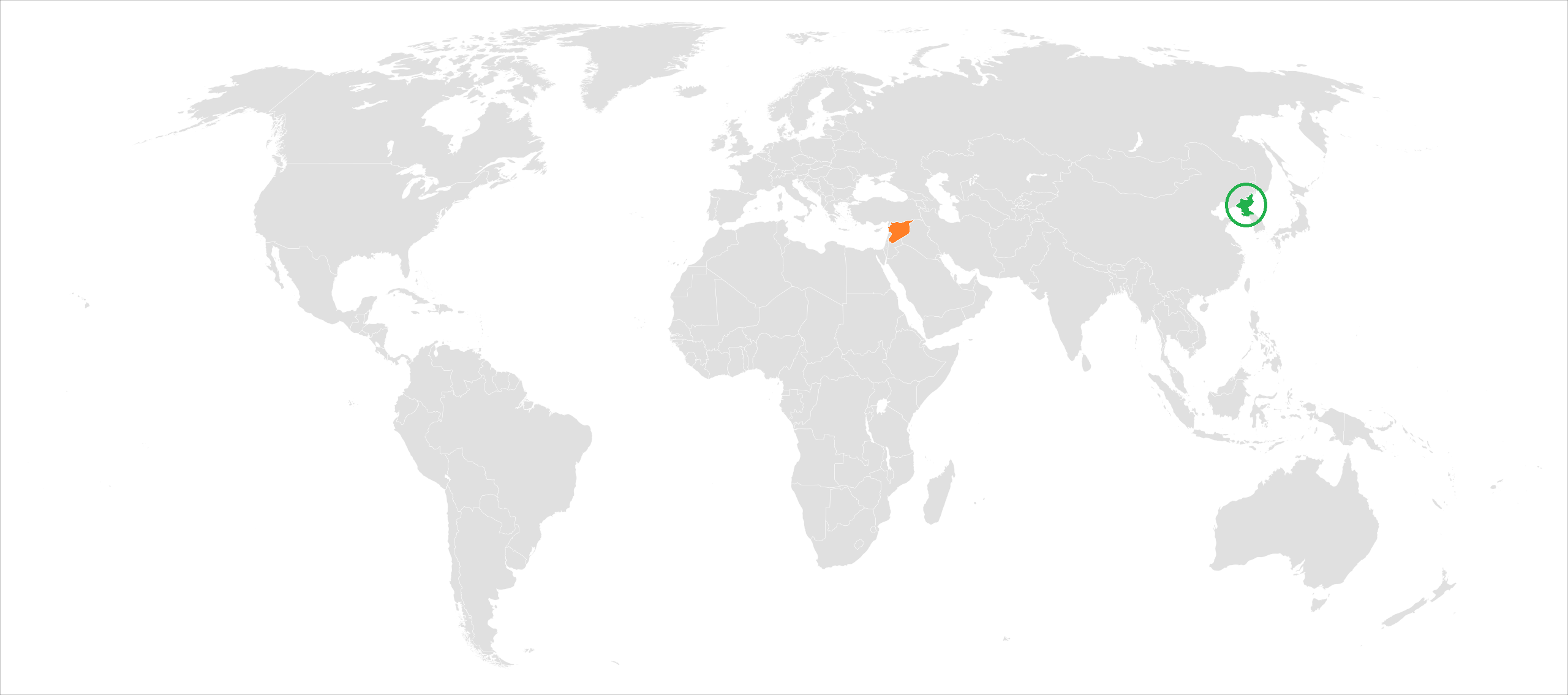

- North Korea: Syria

Diplomatic mission
- Embassy of North Korea, Damascus: Embassy of Syria, Pyongyang

Relations between Democratic People's Republic of Korea (DPRK) and the Syrian Arab Republic (Arabic: العلاقات السورية الكورية الشمالية; Korean: 수리야-조선민주주의인민공화국 관계) were established in 1966. Syria has an embassy in Pyongyang while North Korea has an embassy in Damascus. Before the fall of the Assad regime, North Korea was one of Ba'athist Syria's closest allies, and vice versa.

== Relations with Ba'athist Syria ==
North Korea–Ba'athist Syria relations
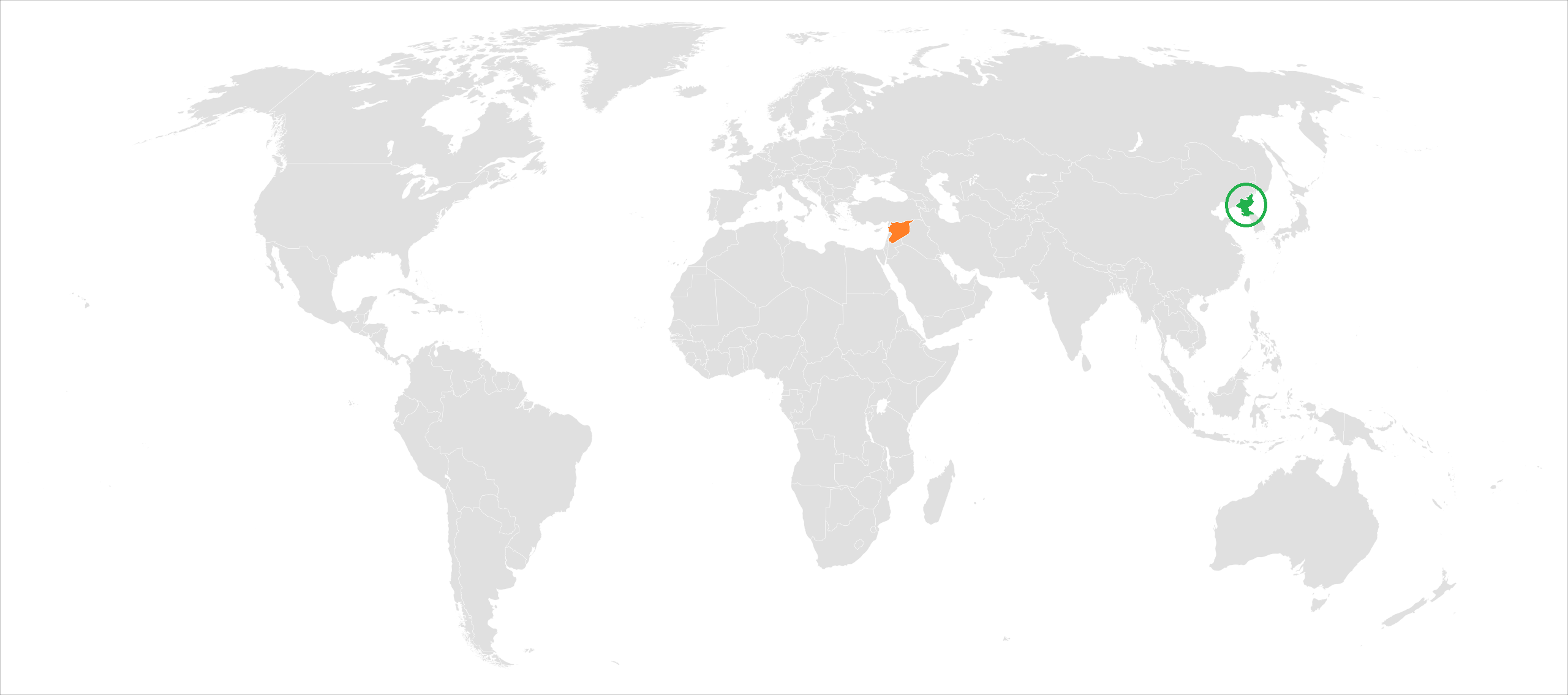

- North Korea: Syria

Diplomatic mission
- Embassy of North Korea, Damascus: Embassy of Syria, Pyongyang

The Syrian Arab Republic recognized the Democratic People's Republic of Korea as the sole legitimate government of Korea and both states had established diplomatic relations on 25 July 1966. Both of the countries were aligned with the Soviet Union and the Eastern Bloc during the Cold War.

The DPRK had provided military assistance to the Syrian Ba'athist regime in its wars with Israel and were improved after the Assad family came into power in 1970. The relations between the two countries remain fair despite the collapse of communist regimes in Eastern Europe and the Soviet Union; as the new Boris Yeltsin government retreated from the Middle East while North Korea suffered a massive famine in the 1990s. In 1986, the two countries signed a technical cooperation agreement. The two countries did indeed have much in common - both were militaristic totalitarian dictatorships with a large cult of personality of the leaders and a socialist party in power.

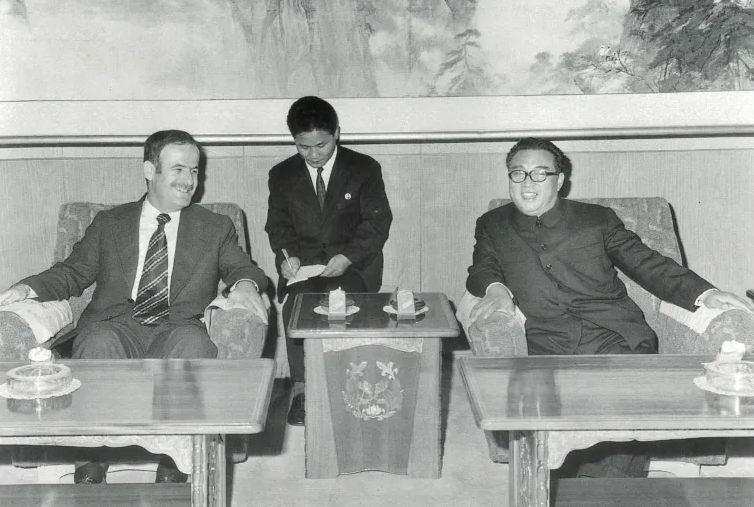
Hafez al-Assad (left) with Kim Il Sung in Pyongyang, 1974. This was his only visit to the DPRK.

North Korea built a nuclear reactor in Syria based on the design of its own reactor at Yongbyon, and North Korean officials traveled regularly to the site. The Syrian reactor was destroyed by Israel in an airstrike in 2007. The United States signed the Iran, North Korea, Syria Nonproliferation Act in 2000.

In 2012, North Korean leader Kim Jong Un expressed support for the Syrian President Bashar al-Assad in face of a growing civil war. In September 2015, the Syrian government paid tribute to Kim Il Sung in a ceremony for a new park in Damascus named in his honor. In 2016, there were reports that North Korean Special Forces were fighting to defend the Syrian government in the Syrian Civil War. North Korea also expressed interest in helping Syria in post-war reconstruction. In 2018, Bashar al-Assad said that he will visit North Korea to meet with Kim Jong Un. A United Nations report released in 2018 alleged that North Korea was helping Syria in developing chemical weapons.

== Post-Ba'athist relations ==
Following the collapse of the Assad family regime in December 2024, the future of the North Korean-Syrian relations is in doubt as North Korea's state media remained silent on the regime's collapse after the rebels took control of the country. The North Korean Embassy in Syria was evacuated.

However, as relations between North Korea and Syria began to gradually deteriorate, the establishment of diplomatic relations with the Republic of Korea (South Korea) by the Syrian transitional government on 10 April 2025 formally tilted Syria towards the Western world.

== See also ==
- Foreign relations of North Korea
- Foreign relations of Syria
- South Korea–Syria relations
