= South Korea–Syria relations =

- South Korea: Syria

Diplomatic mission
- Embassy of South Korea, Beirut: Embassy of Syria, Tokyo

Envoy
- Ambassador of South Korea to Syria: Ambassador of Syria to South Korea

South Korea–Syria relations are the bilateral relations between the Republic of Korea and the Syrian Arab Republic. Formal diplomatic relations were established on 10 April 2025, marking a significant shift in Syria's international relations and completing South Korea's diplomatic outreach and foreign relations to nearly all United Nations member states. As there are currently no direct diplomatic missions, South Korean affairs are handled in the embassy in Beirut, while Syrian affairs are handled in the embassy in Tokyo.

== History ==
Prior to 2025, Syria was the only United Nations member state that did not maintain diplomatic relations with South Korea. This was largely due to Syria's long-standing alliance with North Korea, which included military cooperation and ideological alignment since the Cold War, including during the Syrian civil war. In 1990, the South Korean government once held diplomatic talks with Ba'athist Syria about establishing relations, but they did not reach an agreement.

There have only been several high-level exchanges between the two countries, with the earliest being when South Korea's Deputy Foreign Minister Chang Man-Soon visited Syria in June 1992.

In August 2011, with the outbreak of the Syrian civil war, South Korea imposed a travel ban to Syria for its citizens, which has stayed in place throughout the war.

Following the fall of the Assad regime in December 2024, the Syrian caretaker government was established, led by President Ahmed al-Sharaa was formed. This new administration aimed to normalize relations with Western and Asian nations, including South Korea, as part of broader efforts to reintegrate Syria into the international community.

=== Establishment of diplomatic relations ===
On 11 February, 2025, the South Korean government announced its intention to establish diplomatic relations with Syria. Then on 11 March, the South Korean foreign ministry sent a delegation to meet with Syrian representatives and reach a provisional agreement on establishing relations.

On 10 April 2025, South Korean Foreign Minister Cho Tae-yul visited Damascus and met with Syrian Foreign Minister Asaad al-Shaibani. During the meeting, both sides signed a formal agreement to establish diplomatic relations, which included plans to open embassies and exchange diplomatic missions.

== Economic relations ==
In 2006, KOTRA established a new trade office in Damascus for economic cooperation with Syria even though the two countries didn't have diplomatic relations at the time.

On 12 November 2009, KOTRA officially opened a Korea Business Center in Damascus to facilitate trade between the two countries. In the first three quarters of 2009, Korean exports to Syria reached $725 million, where the autonomotive industry accounted for over 60% of market share.

Following the decade-long Syrian civil war, Syria is in the process of economic reconstruction. In 2025, South Korea has expressed interest in contributing to Syria's post-conflict reconstruction, drawing on its own experience with economic development and infrastructure building.

== Humanitarian aid ==
Following the 2023 Turkey–Syria earthquakes, South Korea sent $1 million in humanitarian aid to Syria.

As a result of the Syrian civil war, Seoul has also regularly provided humanitarian aid to Syria, including food and medical supplies. Following the establishment of diplomatic relations, South Korea offered humanitarian aid in support of Syria's recovery from years of conflict.

== Analysis ==
The move is diplomatically significant for both nations. For South Korea, it marks the near completion of formal ties with all UN member states, with the exception of North Korea. For Syria, it represents a strategic pivot toward broader global engagement and a move away from its previous isolation under the Assad regime.

== See also ==
- Foreign relations of South Korea
- Foreign relations of Syria
- North Korea–Syria relations
