= Egypt–South Korea relations =

Bilateral relations

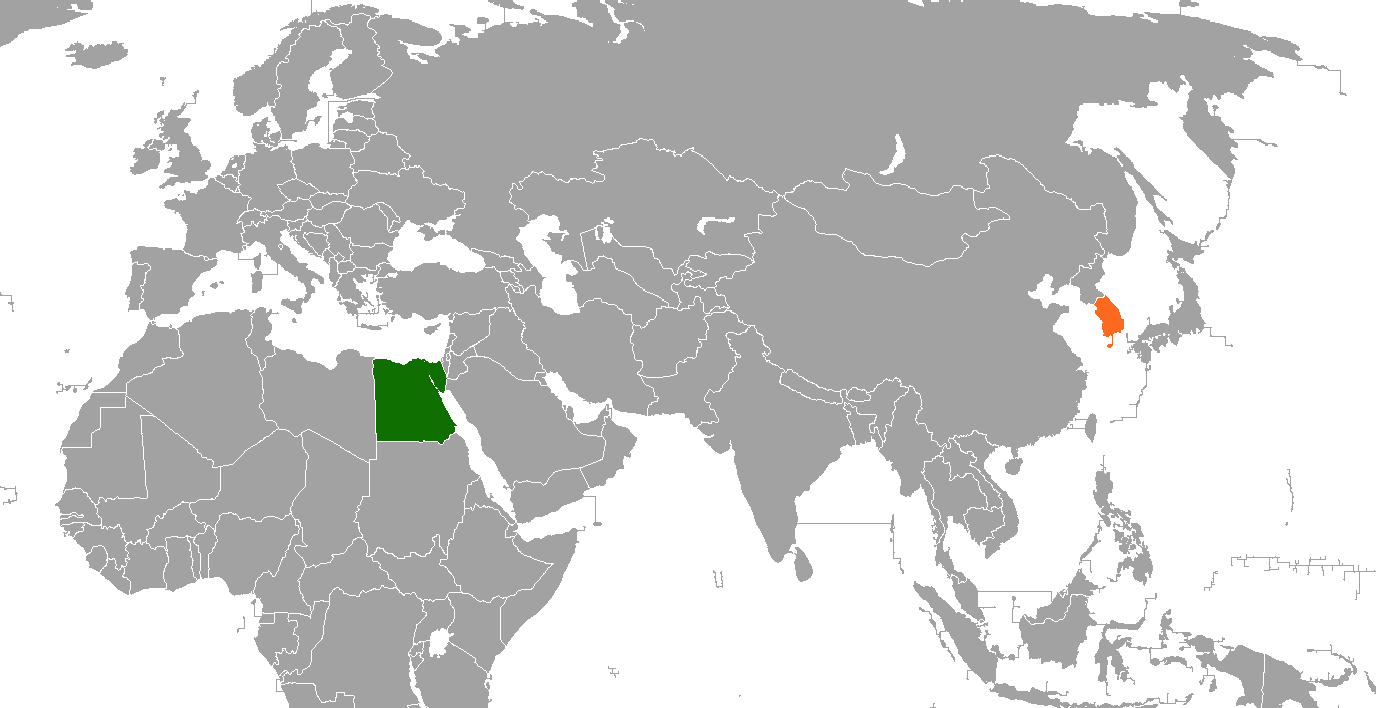
- Egypt: South Korea

Diplomatic mission
- Embassy of Egypt, Seoul: Embassy of South Korea, Cairo

Egypt–South Korea relations are the bilateral relations between Egypt and South Korea, which established consular relations in 1961, although Egypt's close ties with North Korea delayed full diplomatic relations until 13 April 1995. Egypt has an embassy in Seoul and South Korea has an embassy in Cairo. The relationship was described as a comprehensive cooperative partnership from 2016, and it was raised to a strategic partnership during Egyptian president Abdel Fattah el-Sisi's state visit to Seoul in October 2026.

== History ==
=== 1960s ===
South Korea and Egypt established consular relations in 1961, and South Korea opened a consulate-general in Cairo in 1962. North Korea also sent a delegation to Egypt in 1961 to seek consular relations. In 1963, under President Gamal Abdel Nasser, Egypt established full diplomatic relations with North Korea. For more than three decades afterwards, Egypt kept diplomatic relations with Pyongyang and only consular relations with Seoul.

=== 1970s ===
In the early 1970s, North Korea developed close military ties with Egypt. According to declassified South Korean diplomatic cables, the South Korean consulate-general in Cairo reported in 1973 that 33 North Korean air force pilots were stationed at an Egyptian air base near the Suez Canal. The consulate warned that this military cooperation had become a decisive obstacle to South Korea's diplomacy with Egypt. Hosni Mubarak, then commander of the Egyptian Air Force, enlisted North Korean pilots to support Egypt during the October 1973 war with Israel. In 1995, South Korea's Ministry of National Defense announced that Egypt had supplied North Korea with Soviet-made Scud-B missiles in return for the pilot deployment. The Diplomat dates the sale of these missiles to between 1976 and 1981, under President Anwar Sadat.

Egypt also developed economic and political links with South Korea during the decade. In May 1978, the North Korean ambassador in Cairo told Romanian diplomats that Pyongyang was displeased with Egypt's developing relations with Seoul, which included a visit by Egyptian members of parliament to South Korea.

=== 1980s ===
Mubarak remained a close friend of the North Korean leader Kim Il-sung. He visited North Korea as vice president in January 1980 and as president in April 1983 and May 1990. Boutros Boutros-Ghali, who led Egypt's diplomacy from 1977, repeatedly argued for establishing diplomatic relations with South Korea, but Mubarak blocked his efforts. According to Kyunghyang Shinmun, Mubarak promised Kim Il-sung that Egypt would not establish relations with South Korea while Kim was alive. Ties between Egypt and South Korea nevertheless continued to grow, and the two countries signed a program of cultural and scientific cooperation in 1988.

=== 1990s ===
Egypt opened a consulate-general in Seoul in 1991. After Kim Il-sung died in July 1994, Egypt agreed to establish full diplomatic relations with South Korea. South Korea reportedly conducted the negotiations in secret because it feared North Korean interference. The two countries established diplomatic relations on 13 April 1995. South Korea opened its embassy in Cairo on the same day, and Egypt opened its embassy in Seoul on 8 June 1995. A committee for political consultations was set up in 1996.

In August 1997, North Korea's ambassador to Egypt, Jang Seung-gil, defected and sought asylum at the United States embassy in Cairo. Egyptian authorities said that the North Korean embassy had reported Jang missing, and Egypt's ambassador in Seoul later said that his government had not been involved in the defection. Bilateral trade reached US$831 million in 1998. The Asian financial crisis cut the number of South Korean tourists visiting Egypt from about 30,000 a year to about 7,000. By 1999, South Korean companies were taking part in many construction projects in Egypt, and South Korean cars were common on Egyptian roads.

Mubarak made the first visit to South Korea by an Egyptian president from 9 to 11 April 1999. At his summit with President Kim Dae-jung on 9 April, the two leaders agreed on a science and technology agreement, and Egypt expressed support for Kim's engagement policy towards North Korea. Mubarak asked for South Korean investment in Egyptian projects, including a textile factory, the expansion of the Alexandria shipyard and an economic zone on the Gulf of Suez. At the request of South Korea's foreign minister, Egypt also passed messages about the Sunshine Policy to Pyongyang through its ambassador there.

=== 2000s ===
In 2005, the two countries marked the tenth anniversary of relations with events in South Korea, including an exhibition of ancient Egyptian artifacts at the National Library of Korea. The number of South Korean tourists visiting Egypt rose from 22,000 in 2003 to 55,000 in 2004. In March 2006, Roh Moo-hyun made the first visit to Egypt by a South Korean president, meeting Mubarak in Cairo at the start of a tour of Africa and the Middle East. The two presidents signed an agreement on cooperation in information technology and discussed energy cooperation and North Korea's nuclear program. Roh also promoted South Korea's K9 self-propelled howitzer to Egypt. In 2007, the two countries extended their cultural and scientific cooperation program. Bilateral trade reached almost US$1.4 billion in the first five months of 2008.

=== 2010s ===
South Korean prime minister Chung Hong-won visited Egypt in November 2014. The Korean Cultural Center in Cairo opened in the same year. In March 2016, Sisi visited Seoul as the final stop of an Asian tour and met President Park Geun-hye. The two sides signed nine memorandums of understanding covering industry, education, transport and justice. They also agreed to set up an Egyptian-Korean higher institute for technology in Egypt. South Korea's foreign ministry dates the two countries' comprehensive cooperative partnership to 2016. In 2018, Egypt marked the anniversary of diplomatic relations with folk art, music, seminars and art exhibitions.

=== 2020s ===
On 20 January 2022, President Moon Jae-in met Sisi in Cairo, in the first visit to Egypt by a South Korean president in 16 years. The two leaders agreed to establish an economic and political partnership within an integrated strategic framework, and Moon pledged US$1 billion through South Korea's Economic Development Cooperation Fund. Two weeks later, Egypt signed a contract for the K9 howitzer and three memorandums on defence cooperation.

In April 2025, the foreign ministers of the two countries exchanged letters marking the 30th anniversary of diplomatic relations. On 20 November 2025, President Lee Jae-myung visited Cairo for talks with Sisi, his first visit to Egypt since taking office. The two leaders agreed to promote peace in the Middle East and on the Korean Peninsula, and signed agreements covering education, culture and digital government. During the visit, Lee announced a new Middle East policy called SHINE, and South Korea pledged US$10 million to the Egyptian Red Crescent to support refugees from Gaza.

The two countries held their first foreign ministers' strategic dialogue in Seoul on 2 June 2026. Sisi made a state visit to South Korea from 7 to 9 October 2026, his first since 2016. On 8 October, Lee and Sisi issued a joint statement raising their relations to a strategic partnership. The two sides signed or revised 12 memorandums of understanding and launched negotiations on a comprehensive economic partnership agreement, which they had agreed to pursue at the Cairo summit in 2025. They also designated 2027 as a year of cultural exchanges.

== High-level visits ==
Visits by heads of state and government
Date	Visitor	Destination	Notes	Ref.
9–11 April 1999	President Hosni Mubarak	Seoul	First visit to South Korea by an Egyptian president	
March 2006	President Roh Moo-hyun	Cairo	First visit to Egypt by a South Korean president	
November 2014	Prime Minister Chung Hong-won	Egypt		
March 2016	President Abdel Fattah el-Sisi	Seoul	Nine memorandums of understanding signed	
20 January 2022	President Moon Jae-in	Cairo	First presidential visit in 16 years	
20 November 2025	President Lee Jae-myung	Cairo	30th anniversary of diplomatic relations	
7–9 October 2026	President Abdel Fattah el-Sisi	Seoul	State visit, strategic partnership	

== Economic relations ==
In 2020, bilateral trade was worth US$1.56 billion, with South Korea exporting US$1.21 billion in goods such as cars and synthetic resins and importing US$340 million in goods such as petroleum products. Daily News Egypt reported trade of about US$3.2 billion in 2022 and US$2 billion in 2023, noting that figures differ between sources. In 2025, Ahram Online put annual trade at more than US$3 billion.

South Korea's cumulative investment in Egypt reached US$930 million in 2024, and 171 South Korean companies were registered with Egypt's General Authority for Investment. Samsung, LG, Hyundai Rotem and SK lead South Korean investment in Egypt. Samsung Electronics operates a manufacturing facility in Egypt, and Hyundai Rotem has worked on the Cairo Metro. South Korea raised its pledge of soft loans to Egypt from US$1 billion to US$3 billion. Egypt is South Korea's only priority partner for official development assistance in the Middle East and North Africa, with a total of US$350 million in aid. About 750 South Koreans live in Egypt.

During his 2026 visit, Sisi called for an integrated South Korean industrial zone in the Suez Canal Economic Zone, and the two countries agreed to revive the Egyptian-Korean Business Council and hold a regular economic forum.

== Defence cooperation ==
In February 2022, Egypt agreed to buy K9 self-propelled howitzers from Hanwha Defense in a deal worth about US$1.7 billion, the largest export contract for the system and its first sale to Africa. Most of the howitzers and vehicles were to be produced locally at a state-run factory outside Cairo. Egypt's deputy defence minister also signed three memorandums covering the defence industry, logistics support and defence research and development.

== Cultural relations ==
The two countries signed a cultural and scientific cooperation program in 1988 and extended it in 2007. The Korean Cultural Center in Cairo, run under South Korea's Ministry of Culture, offers Korean language classes, film screenings and exhibitions. In 2022, it launched a K-pop academy and a course in Korean traditional music. According to Spotify, K-pop streaming in Egypt grew by 33 per cent in 2020. The number of Egyptian students studying the Korean language has also increased significantly. During Lee's 2025 visit, Sisi proposed a South Korean science and technology university and South Korean schools in Egypt.

== See also ==
- Foreign relations of Egypt
- Foreign relations of South Korea
- Egypt–North Korea relations
