= South Africa–South Korea relations =

Bilateral relations

- South Africa: South Korea

South Africa–South Korea relations are the bilateral relations between South Africa and South Korea. During the 1950s, two countries fought together during the Korean War under the United Nations Command. Formal diplomatic relations began on December 1, 1992. The two governments signed accords regulating taxes, aviation, and investment. High-level visits followed. In July 1995, South African President Nelson Mandela visited Seoul to meet with South Korean president Kim Young-sam. To institutionalize these visits, in 1997 the two nations agreed to hold regular Policy Consultative Meetings, where working groups focused on particular subjects of the relationship convene to negotiate shared rules and regulations. In 2005, Seoul hosted the Korea–South Africa Joint Committee on Science and Technology to promote cross-border scientific collaboration.

== Economic relations ==
South Africa is South Korea’s largest African trading partner, and South Korea is South Africa’s fourth largest Asian trading partner. South Africa largely exports unprocessed minerals, like ferro-chromium or platinum; semi-processed inputs like steel; and foodstuffs like sugar. Two growing areas of modern exchange include green energy, where South Korean and South African firms exchange solar energy and rare earth elements, and bilateral investment.

== Trade ==
	1995	2000	2005	2010	2015	2022
South Africa to South Korea	$0.60B	$0.54B	$1.40B	$1.84B	$1.20B	$1.25B
South Korea to South Africa	$1.26B	$0.90B	$1.48B	$1.78B	$1.31B	$2.89B
