= Gabon–South Korea relations =

- Gabon: South Korea

Gabon–South Korea relations are the bilateral relations between Gabon and South Korea.

== History ==
Gabon gained independence from France in 1960. On 1 October 1962, Gabon and the Republic of Korea (South Korea) established formal diplomatic relations. Since then, relations between the two countries have developed, and high-level exchanges have been maintained. Gabon's President-for-life, Omar Bongo Ondimba, visited South Korea four times, in 1975, 1984, 1996, and 2007. After Omar Bongo's death, his son, Ali Bongo Ondimba, became President of Gabon. While in office, he emphasised developing relations with South Korea. In 2010, Ali Bongo visited South Korea for the first time, and was received by South Korea's President Lee Myung-bak. The two agreed to strengthen cooperation in resources and infrastructure construction. In 2012, Ali Bongo visited South Korea again.

In 1980, South Korea's foreign minister Lho Shin-yong visited Gabon. In 1982, President Chun Doo-hwan made a state visit to Gabon. In 2011, foreign minister Kim Sung-hwan visited Gabon again and exchanged views with the Gabon government on strengthening high-level visits, investment from South Korea, and the Korean peninsula question.

In 2013, South Korea's foreign minister Yun Byung-se received Gabon's Minister of Foreign Affairs, Emmanuel Issoze-Ngondet, at the Korean foreign ministry. The two sides established a telephone consultation mechanism between the two foreign ministers, and signed an agreement on visa exemptions for holders of diplomatic and official passports.

== Diplomatic missions ==
Gabon established an embassy in Seoul in 1975, which was the first embassy from an African country established in South Korea. It also has dual accreditation to Thailand and the Philippines.

South Korea established an embassy in Libreville in 1973, which also was accredited to Equatorial Guinea and São Tomé and Príncipe.

== Economic relations ==
=== Bilateral trade ===
According to statistics from the Observatory of Economic Complexity, Gabon exported US$160 million worth of goods to South Korea in 2020, which made up 3.3% of its total exports. South Korea is Gabon's fourth largest trading partner in the Indo-Pacific region, after the People's Republic of China, India, and Singapore. Gabon's primary exports were petroleum, manganese ore, and other raw materials. In that year, South Korea's exports to Gabon approached US$10 million.

=== Investment ===
After President Ali Bongo's first visit to South Korea in 2010, Korean companies began to pay attention to Gabon's infrastructure construction and raw material exploration. The Gabonese government was also keen to attract Korean investment in information technology, services, agriculture, and resource development.

== Development aid ==
Between 1991 and 2015, South Korea's development aid to Gabon reached US$1.53 million.
