= Egypt–North Korea relations =

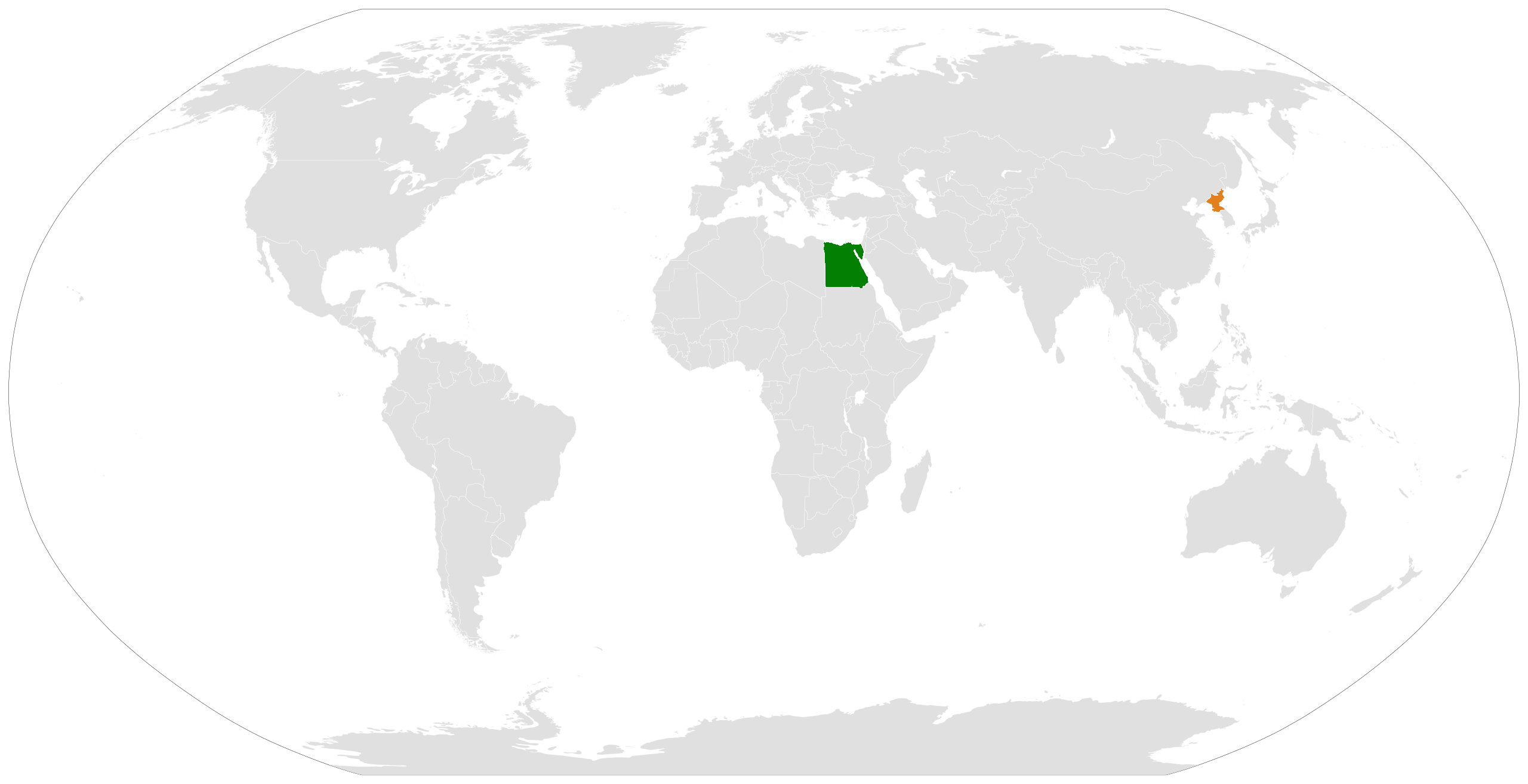

- Egypt: North Korea

Egypt–North Korea relations refer to the bilateral relations between Egypt and North Korea. Egypt has an embassy in Pyongyang whilst North Korea has an embassy in Cairo.

== History ==
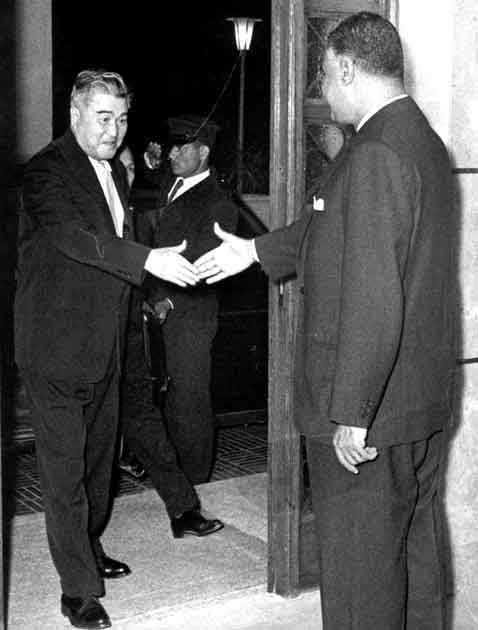
President Gamal Abdel Nasser shaking hands with Vice Marshal Choe Yong Gon during the latter's official visit to Cairo, 1964

Relations have remained fairly strong since the time of Gamal Abdel Nasser and the Non-Aligned Movement, when North Korea strongly supported Nasser's decision to nationalise the Suez Canal. During the Suez Crisis, on 3 November 1956, the DPRK issued a declaration of solidarity with Egypt, and sent a small amount of financial aid (60.000 won) in the aftermath of the invasion. In 1957 and 1958, the two governments signed a trade agreement and a cultural cooperation agreement, respectively. A North Korean diplomatic delegation was sent to Egypt in 1961 for the purpose of establishing consular relations. On 24 August 1963, the two governments elevated their diplomatic relations to the ambassadorial level.

During the annual UN General Assembly debates over the Korean problem, Egypt initially abstained on the question of whether both Koreas or only the Republic of Korea should be invited to participate in the UN discussions. On 11 December 1962, Egypt, for the first time, voted in favor of a Soviet draft resolution on inviting both Koreas; this step was probably a reaction to the recent establishment of diplomatic relations between Israel and South Korea (9 April 1962). Nevertheless, in 1962-1966 Egypt still refrained from rejecting the U.S.-sponsored UN resolutions on Korea; instead, it preferred to abstain from voting.

In the aftermath of the Six-Day War, North Korea provided Egypt with food aid (5.000 tons of cereals). Egypt, on its part, switched to a consistently pro-DPRK position in the UN. At that time, this shift reflected Nasser's growing dependence on Soviet assistance, but the Egyptian government maintained cordial relations with the DPRK even after Nasser's successor, Anwar Sadat, broke with the USSR in favor of a partnership with the U.S. In 1973–1976, Egypt continued to side with North Korea in the UN and the Non-Aligned Movement, whereas the DPRK expressed agreement with the Sinai Interim Agreement, the abrogation of the Egyptian-Soviet treaty of friendship (14 March 1976), Sadat's visit in Jerusalem (19–21 November 1977), and the Camp David Accords.

In 2015, Egyptian President Abdel Fattah el-Sisi, who has refused to enforce United Nations sanctions against North Korea, invited North Korean leader Kim Jong Un to attend the reopening of the reworked Suez Canal; Kim Yong-nam attended in his place.

== Military ==
During the visit of a North Korean government delegation headed by Kang Ryang-uk (1-7 March 1973), Egyptian Chief of Staff Saad el-Shazly asked the delegates to dispatch DPRK troops to train Egyptian pilots. On April 6–13, Shazly visited the DPRK, and gained the consent of Kim Il Sung. The North Korean trainers (20 pilots and 18 other staff members) arrived in June, and were assigned in July. On October 18, after the outbreak the Yom Kippur War, Kim Il Sung sent Egypt and 16 other Arab states a message of solidarity. However, during the Libyan–Egyptian War in July 1977, North Korea sided with Libya.

President Anwar el-Sadat approved the sale of R-17 Elbrus missiles to North Korea between 1976 and 1981. North Korea has also helped Egypt develop its own missile systems. North Korea obtained its first Scud-B ballistic missiles from Egypt in 1979 or 1980, whereas in the 1990s, Egypt purchased Scud-C missiles from North Korea.

Port Said has served as a transshipment port for North Korea weapon exports to Africa. The United Nations reported in 2016 that a North Korean freighter containing some 30,000 rocket-propelled grenades worth an estimated $26 million had been intercepted off the coast of Egypt; the RPGs were allegedly purchased by the Egypt-based Arab Organization for Industrialization overseen by President Abdel Fattah el-Sisi.

In 2017, following a visit to South Korea, Egyptian Defense Minister Sedki Sobhi reportedly announced that Egypt had "severed all military ties with North Korea", after the US slashed some $291 million worth of aid to Egypt.

== Economic relations ==
Egypt is one of North Korea's biggest trading partners. As of 2010, Egypt is the third-largest importer of North Korean goods, after China and South Korea, and also ranks among the top five exporters to North Korea. The Egyptian telecommunications company Orascom was critical to the establishment of Koryolink in 2008, creating North Korea's only 3G phone network. Orascom also became the first non-North Korean company to own a telecom license in North Korea.

== See also ==
- Foreign relations of Egypt
- Foreign relations of North Korea
