= Indo-Pacific strategy of South Korea =

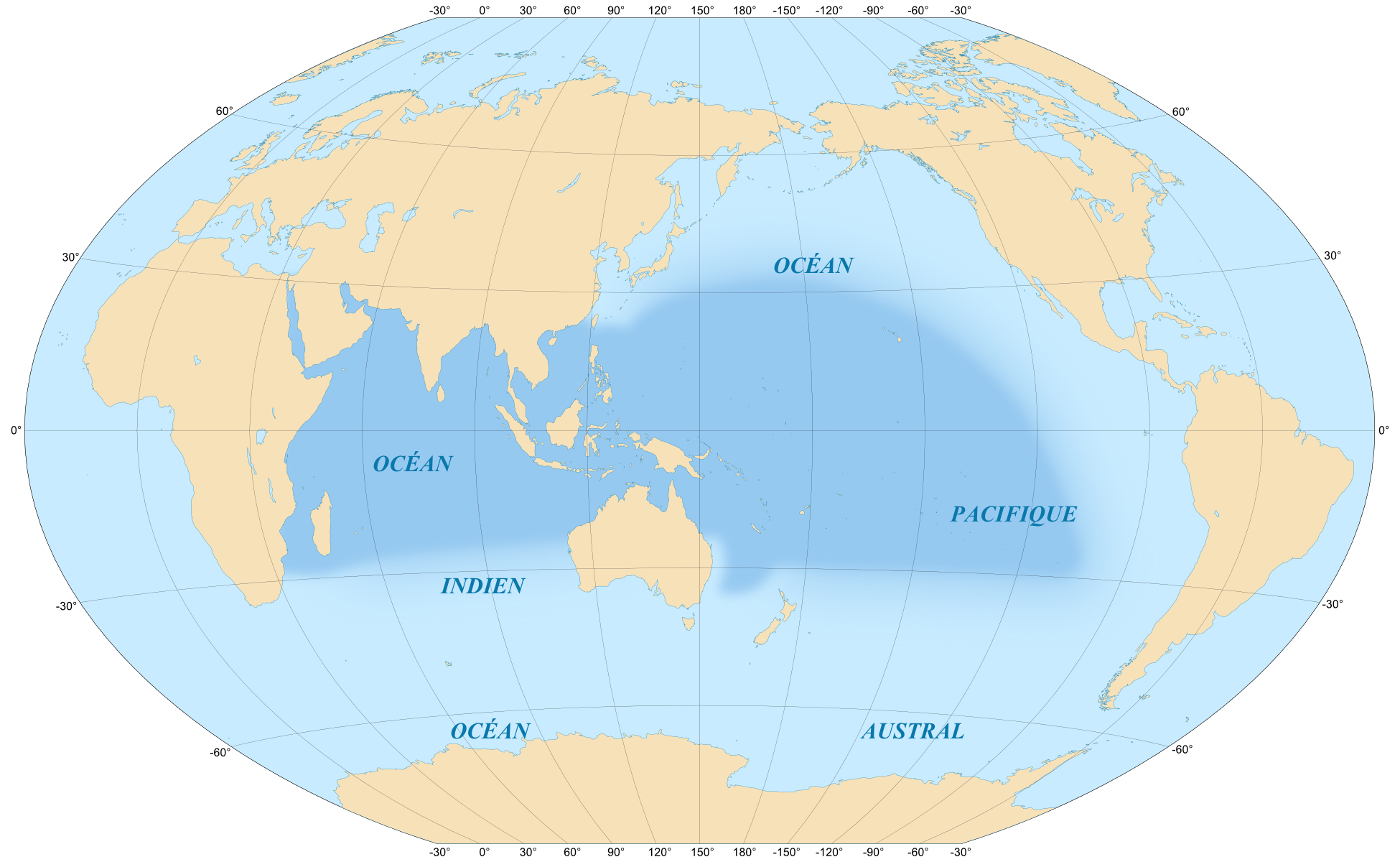
Indo-Pacific

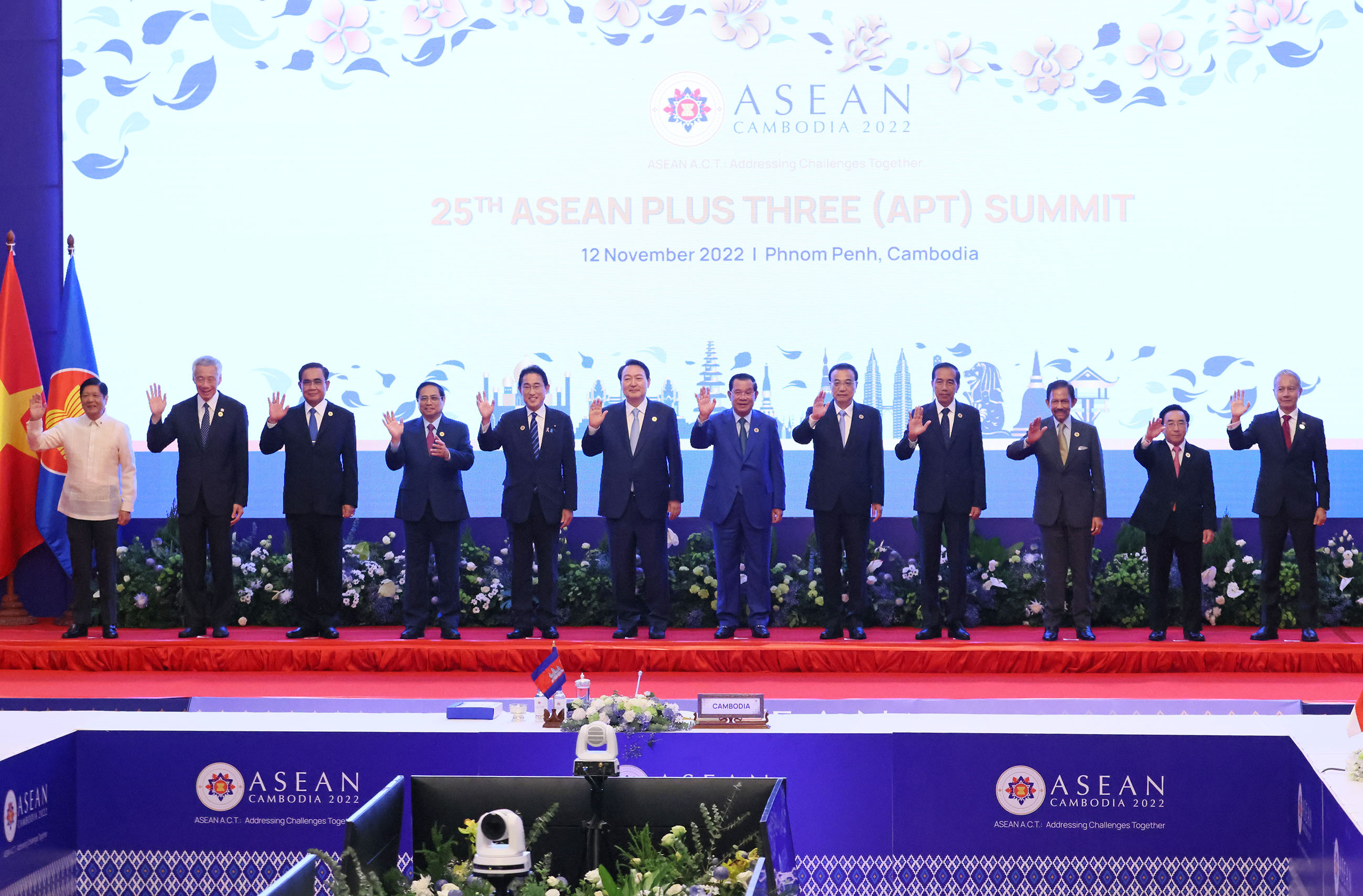
President Yoon Suk Yeol attends ASEAN+3 Summit

South Korea's Indo-Pacific strategy is a comprehensive strategy that encompasses the economic and security spheres of Indo-Pacific countries. Announcing the strategy, South Korea said, "While strengthening the rules-based international order, which is conducive to a stable and prosperous Indo-Pacific, we will work towards a regional order that enables a diverse set of nations to cooperate and prosper together."

President Yoon Suk Yeol emphasized the importance of the Indo-Pacific at a Republic of Korea-ASEAN Summit in November 2022, saying, "Peace and stability in the Indo-Pacific region directly affect our survival and prosperity."

== Overall ==
The Indo-Pacific strategy proposed by the Ministry of Foreign Affairs of South Korea is a 37-page document. It is regarded as the country's comprehensive regional strategy and will form a foreign policy for the Indo-Pacific region in the future. As emphasized in the report, the target regions for the Indo-Pacific strategy can be understood as the North Pacific, Southeast Asia, South Asia, Africa, and Oceanian countries along the Indian Ocean, Europe, and Latin America.

== Core Lines ==
- Build Regional Order Based on Norms and Rules

South Korean Foreign Minister, Park Jin, said the country should confront global issues head-on, urge countries to cooperate, and set an example. He said the country will play a role in establishing a rule-based international order that respects the rule of law and human rights by encouraging inclusivity, trust, and reciprocity.

- Build Economic Security Networks

South Korea has a plan of promoting free trade and a rules-based economic order in the Indo- Pacific.

- Strengthen Cooperation in Science and Technology

At the 2019 ASEAN 10-nation Special Group Summit, South Korea and ASEAN agreed to launch a technical cooperation organization.

South Korea's Industry Minister, Sung Yun-mo said, "South Korea can, for example, implement projects to beef up the competitiveness of Vietnamese firms based on its advanced technologies, and pursue further progress with countries that already have high technology levels, such as Singapore. Korea has decided to establish a joint research center for standardization in cooperation with ASEAN.

- Led Climate Change and Energy Security Cooperation

At COP27, Korea will contribute to reducing greenhouse gas emissions by balancing various energy sources, including renewable energy and nuclear power, said Na Kyung-won, the presidential envoy. At COP26, the government announced that South Korea's greenhouse gas emission by 2030 will be 60 percent of that by 2018.

South Korea announced additional cooperation with Quad in its working group on vaccines, new technologies, and climate initiatives. By providing solutions to nuclear power and cooperation on electric and hydrogen cars, Korea wants to contribute to climate goals. It has also increased development aid to developing countries, especially for digitalization.

== Cooperation with other countries ==
=== America ===
==== Canada ====
In APEC South Korea 2025, Canada signed defence cooperation partnership(dcp) with South Korea.

==== United States ====
Based on Mutual Defense Treaty, two countries has been cooperating in both military and diplomatic areas. Two countries are also working together with the concept of Indo-Pacific strategy with various examples, such as joint military exercises. In trade areas, two countries are both members of Indo-Pacific Economic Framework.

=== Asia ===
==== Japan ====
South Korea has called Japan "our closest neighbor." It also said Japan is essential for promoting cooperation and solidarity among like-minded Indo-Pacific countries.

==== China ====
The strategy stresses its inclusiveness that “neither targets nor excludes any specific nation” and specifies China as “a key partner for Korea to achieve its peace and prosperity in the Indo-Pacific.

==== South East Asia ====
ASEAN is a very important partner for Korea, as Korea tried to deepen diplomacy with the region in 2017 through its former strategy of New Southern Policy during the Moon Jae-in government.

Korea named Southeast Asia and ASEAN the second on its list of major partners, after its North Pacific neighbors. Korea announced the Korea-ASEAN Solidarity Initiative, which aims to improve economic ties, and agreed to deepen cooperation with ASEAN in various fields.

=== Europe ===
South Korea is the only country with three basic agreements with the EU that encompasses economic, political, and security. This is reflected in Brussels' Indo-Pacific strategy, in which South Korea is recognized as a potential partner in everything from semiconductors to digital cooperation. South Korea is also reflected in the EU's ESIWA project, which lists South Korea as one of the key partners in action cooperation.

When President Yoon attended the NATO summit in June 2022, he expressed Korea's commitment to strengthening its partnership with NATO and contributing to the preservation of rules-based international order based on the common values of democracy and the rule of law. This partnership is expected to be further developed through the recently established Korean mission to NATO. The Yoon government showed its intent to cooperate with other countries with shared interests and values, including United Kingdom and Turkey and the European Union and its member states like France, Germany, Italy and Spain.

=== Other countries ===
This strategy highlights South Korea's plan to pursue deeper cooperative relationships with like-minded countries in the Canada, Australia, New Zealand, Taiwan, Middle East, Africa, and Latin America. The Yoon administration is trying to strengthen Korea's leadership in the region.

== See also ==
- Indo-Pacific
- Foreign relations of South Korea
- South Korean foreign policy
- Foreign policy of the Yoon Suk Yeol government
- Bangladesh and the Indo-Pacific Strategy
