= Park Jin =

South Korean politician (born 1956)

The Honourable Park Jin CBE
- 박진
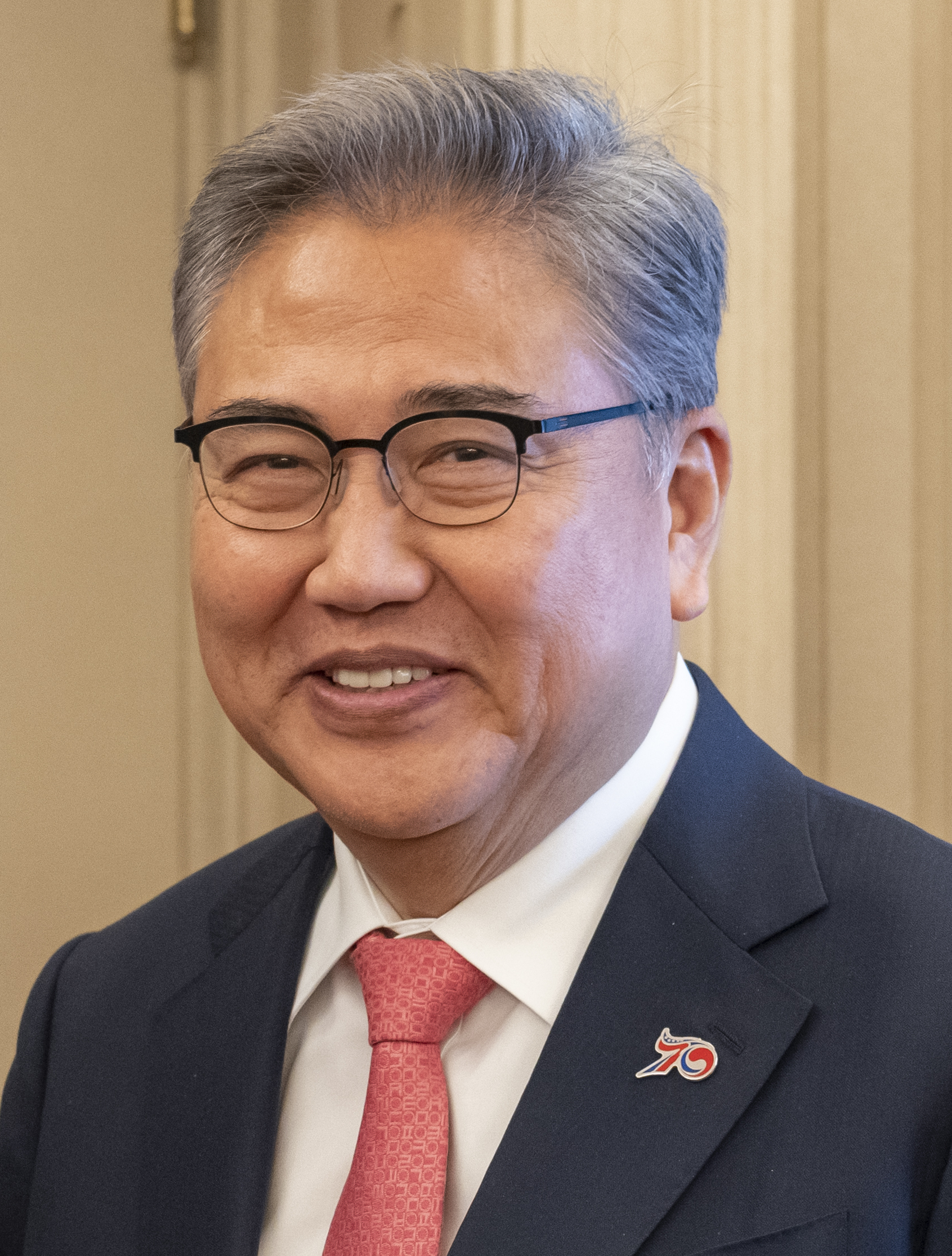
- Park in 2023

40th Minister of Foreign Affairs
- In office 12 May 2022 – 10 January 2024
- President: Yoon Suk Yeol
- Prime Minister: Choo Kyung-ho (acting); Han Duck-soo
- Preceded by: Chung Eui-yong
- Succeeded by: Cho Tae-yul

Member of the National Assembly
- In office 30 May 2020 – 29 May 2024
- Preceded by: Jeon Hyun-hee
- Succeeded by: Park Soo-min
- Constituency: Gangnam B (Seoul)
- In office 9 August 2002 – 29 May 2012
- Preceded by: Roh Moo-hyun; ~~Chung In-bong~~
- Succeeded by: Chung Sye-kyun
- Constituency: Jongno (Seoul)

Personal details
- Born: 16 September 1956 (age 70) Seoul, South Korea
- Party: People Power
- Education: Seoul National University (LLB); Harvard University (MPA); University of Oxford (DPhil); New York University (LLM)

Military service
- Allegiance: South Korea
- Branch/service: Republic of Korea Navy
- Years of service: 1980–1983
- Rank: Lieutenant JG (Korean: Jungwi)

Korean name
- Hangul: 박진
- Hanja: 朴振
- RR: Bak Jin
- MR: Pak Chin

Park Jin CBE (Korean: 박진; born 16 September 1956) is a South Korean diplomat and politician who served as the minister of foreign affairs from 2022 to 2024. He was a member of the National Assembly from 2002 to 2012 and from 2020 to 2024.

As foreign minister, Park presided over South Korea's controversial support for Israel and Azerbaijan during the Gaza war and 2023 Azerbaijani offensive in Nagorno–Karabakh respectively, as both countries were accused of genocide and ethnic cleansing.

== Biography ==
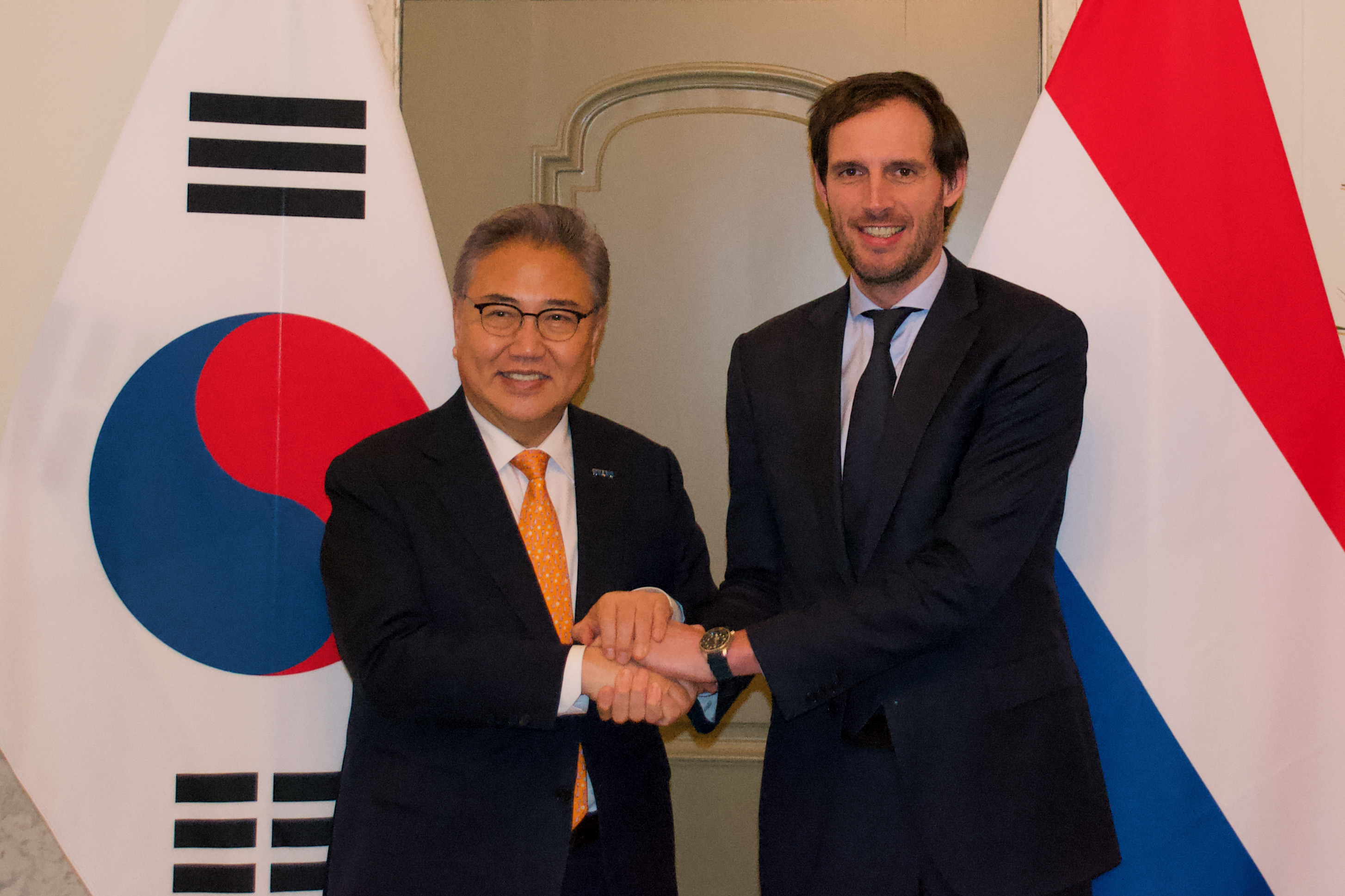
Minister Park met Dutch foreign minister Wopke Hoekstra.

Park passed the 11th Foreign Affairs Examination in 1977 and served as a Ministry of Foreign Affairs (South Korea) Officer in 1978. From 1980 to 1983, he served as a naval officer through a course of naval cadets. He was selected for the seventh term of state-funded international studies in 1983 and earned a master's degree in public administration at Harvard Kennedy School in 1985 and a Ph.D. in political science at Oxford University in 1993.

Since 1993, he has served as an overseas press secretary and political secretary at the presidential secretariat of the Kim Young-sam administration. Since 2002, he has served as the 16th and 17th lawmakers of Jongno-gu, Seoul, and served as the chairman of the National Assembly's Foreign Affairs and Trade Committee, taking the lead in ratifying the United States-Korea Free Trade Agreement and passing the North Korean Human Rights Act.

In 2008, he visited the U.S. as the head of the Korea-U.S. Congressional Diplomatic Association and met Joe Biden, then chair of the Senate Foreign Relations Committee.

In 2020, he moved to Gangnam-gu B, Seoul, and was elected to the 21st National Assembly (South Korea). In May 2022, he was appointed Foreign Minister of the Yoon Suk-yeol government.

In 2024, he ran in Seodaemun-gu B district in Seoul but was unsuccessful.

== Career ==
- May 2022 – Jan. 2024 Ministry of Foreign Affairs
- Apr. 2022 Head of the ROK-US Policy Consultation Delegation, 20th Presidential Transition Committee
- Jan. 2022 – Mar. 2022 Chairman of the Global Vision Committee, 20th Presidential Election Headquarters, People Power Party (South Korea)
- Sep. 2020 – Co- President of the Parliamentary Diplomacy Forum on the United States, 21st National Assembly (South Korea)
- Jul. 2020 – Co- Chairman of the Future Policy Research Association, 21st National Assembly (South Korea)
- Jul. 2020 – Chairman of the Global Diplomacy and Security Forum, 21st National Assembly (South Korea)
- Jul. 2020 Member, Foreign Affairs and Unification Committee, 21st National Assembly (South Korea)
- Jun. 2020 Chairman of the Special Committee on Diplomacy & Security, People Power Party (South Korea)
- May 2020 – Member of the 21st National Assembly (South Korea) (Gangnam 2nd District)
- Feb. 2017 – Feb. 2020 Chairman, Korea-America Association
- 2014 – Global Fellow, Woodrow Wilson International Center for Scholars
- Mar. 2013 – May 2020 Endowed Chair Professor, Graduate School of International and Area Studies, Hankuk University of Foreign Studies
- Aug. 2008 – Aug. 2010 Chairman, Foreign Affairs, Trade, and Unification Committee, 18th National Assembly (South Korea)
- May 2008 – May 2012 Member of the 18th National Assembly (South Korea) (Jongno District)
- Dec. 2007 – Feb. 2008 Head of the Foreign Affairs, Unification, and Security Subcommittee,17th Presidential Transition Committee
- Sep. 2007 – Jun. 2008 Chairman of the International Committee, Grand National Party
- Jul. 2004 – Feb. 2005 Chairman of the International Committee, Grand National Party
- May 2004 – May 2008 Member of the 17th National Assembly (South Korea) (Jongno District)
- 2004–2017 President, Korea Britain Society
- Aug. 2002 – May 2004 Member of the 16th National Assembly (South Korea) (Jongno District)
- Mar. 1999 – Feb. 2002 Research Professor, Institute of East and West Studies, Yonsei University
- Jul. 1996 – Mar. 1998 Presidential Secretary for Political Affairs, Office of the President
- May 1993 – Jul. 1996 Presidential Press Secretary, Office of the President
- 1990–1993 Lecturer in Politics, University of Newcastle upon Tyne
- 1989–1990 MacArthur Foundation Fellow, King's College London
- 1987–1988 Japan Foundation Fellow, University of Tokyo, Komaba Campus
- Nov. 1977 – Mar. 1978 Ministry of Foreign Affairs (South Korea)
- Aug. 1977 – Passed the Foreign Service Examination

== Election results ==
Year	Elections	Constituency	Political party	Votes (%)	Results
2002	2002 By-election	Jongno (Seoul)	GNP	20,300 (50.30%)	Won
2004	17th National Assembly General Election	Jongno (Seoul)	GNP	37,431 (42.81%)	Won
2008	18th National Assembly General Election	Jongno (Seoul)	GNP	34,113 (48.43%)	Won
2020	21st National Assembly General Election	Gangnam B (Seoul)	UFP	51,762 (50.94%)	Won
2024	22nd National Assembly General Election	Seodaemun B (Seoul)	PPP	42,059 (42.37%)	Defeated (2nd)

National Assembly of the Republic of Korea
Preceded by Roh Moo-hyun; ~~Chung In-bong~~	Member of the National Assembly from Jongno (Seoul); 9 August 2002–29 May 2012	Succeeded by Chung Sye-kyun
Preceded by Jeon Hyun-hee	Member of the National Assembly from Gangnam B (Seoul); 30 May 2020–29 May 2024	Succeeded by Park Soo-min
Political offices
Preceded by Chung Eui-yong	Minister of Foreign Affairs; 12 May 2022–10 January 2024	Succeeded by Cho Tae-yul
