= List of international trips made by Ban Ki-moon as Secretary-General of the United Nations =

This is a list of international trips made by UN Secretary-General Ban Ki-moon. Ban assumed office on January 1, 2007. He visited 155 countries.

== 2015 ==
Date	Countries	Places visited	Narrative
10–13 January	India	New Delhi; Ahmedabad; Vadodara	Ban met with the chairman of the Intergovernmental Panel on Climate Change Rajendra K. Pachauri. In Ahmedabad het attended the 8th Vibrant Gujarat Summit. He met also with Indian prime minister Narendra Modi, U.S. Secretary of State John Kerry, and with Prime Minister of Bhutan, Tshering Tobgay In Vadodara Ban inaugurated a solar energy plant. Back in New Delhi he met with several Indian officials.
14–15 January	Honduras	Tegucigalpa; Copán Ruinas	Ban met with the president of Honduras, Juan Orlando Hernández, and several other officials. He also visited the UNESCO World Heritage Site of Copán Ruinas.
15–17 January	El Salvador	San Salvador; Joya de Cerén	Ban attended the 23rd anniversary of the peace agreements that put an end to civil war in El Salvador. He met with Salvadoran President Salvador Sánchez Cerén and other officials. He also visited the UNESCO World Heritage Site of Joya de Cerén.
22–24 January	Switzerland	Davos	Ban attended the annual meeting of the World Economic Forum. This trip included meetings with Word Bank President Jim Yong Kim and European Parliament President Martin Schulz.
29–31 January	Ethiopia	Addis Ababa	Ban attended the 24th summit of the African Union. He met with the Chairperson of the African Union Nkosazana Dlamini-Zuma and with several African heads of state.
7–8 February	Saudi Arabia	Riyadh	Ban met with Secretary-General of the Gulf Cooperation Council Abdullatif bin Rashid Al Zayani. He also had an audience with King Salman of Saudi Arabia.
8–10 February	United Arab Emirates	Dubai; Abu Dhabi	Ban attended the 2015 Government Summit in Dubai. He met with Mohammed bin Zayed Al Nahyan, Crown Prince of the United Arab Emirates, in Abu Dhabi.
18–19 February	United States	Washington, D.C.	Ban attended the Summit on Countering Violent Extremism
25–26 February	Paraguay	Asunción	Ban met with Paraguayan President Horacio Cartes and other officials. He also visited the Itaipu Dam.
26 February – 1 March	Chile	Santiago; Isla Negra	Ban attended a high-level event on "Women in Power and Decision-Making". He met with Chilean president Michelle Bachelet, Lithuanian president Dalia Grybauskaitė and other officials. He also visited the Pablo Neruda museum.
13–17 March	Japan	Sendai; Tokyo	Ban met with Japanese prime minister Shinzō Abe. He then opened and attended the 3rd United Nations World Conference on Disaster Risk Reduction. He also met with Baldwin Lonsdale, President of Vanuatu, Gurbanguly Berdimuhamedow, President of Turkmenistan, Prayut Chan-o-cha, Prime Minister of Thailand, Hun Sen, Prime Minister of Cambodia, King Mswati III of Swaziland, and several other international and Japanese officials. He also had an audience with Crown Prince Naruhito.
17–21 March	Italy	Rome; Turin	Ban met with Italian president Sergio Mattarella and Italian prime minister Matteo Renzi. He then attended the 2015 Secretary-General's retreat in Turin.
28–30 March	Egypt	Sharm el-Sheikh	Ban attended the Summit of the Arab League. This trip included several bilateral meetings with heads of state from the region.
30 March	Iraq	Baghdad	Ban met with Iraqi president Fuad Masum and Iraqi prime minister Haider al-Abadi.
30 March – 1 April	Kuwait	Kuwait City	Ban attended the 3rd Humanitarian Pledging Conference for Syria. He attended several bilateral meetings, including with the Emir of Kuwait, Sabah Al-Ahmad Al-Jaber Al-Sabah.
9–10 April	Panama	Panama City	Ban attended the 7th Summit of the Americas. This trip included several bilateral meetings with regional leaders.
11–13 April	Qatar	Doha	Ban attended the 13th UN Congress on Crime Prevention and Criminal Justice. He also met with Tamim bin Hamad Al Thani, Emir of Qatar, and Abdullah bin Nasser bin Khalifa Al Thani, Prime Minister of Qatar.
15–18 April	United States	Washington, D.C.	Ban attended the Spring Meetings of the World Bank Group and the International Monetary Fund. He also met with United States officials.
26–28 April	Italy; Vatican City	Rome; Vatican City	Ban visited the Italian navy ship San Giusto off the coast of Sicily. He was accompanied by Italian prime minister Matteo Renzi and EU High Representative Federica Mogherini. In Rome, he also met with Queen Silvia of Sweden and had an audience with Pope Francis.
28 April −1 May	France	Paris	Ban met with the secretary-general of the OECD José Ángel Gurría. He then visited the UNESCO headquarters for several meetings. He also met with French president François Hollande.
6–8 May	Poland	Gdańsk	Ban attended the commemorations for the 70th anniversary of the end of World War II. He also met with Polish president Bronisław Komorowski, Ukrainian president Petro Poroshenko and Polish prime minister Ewa Kopacz.
8 May	Ukraine	Kyiv	Ban attended the commemorations for the 70th anniversary of the end of World War II. He also met with Ukrainian president Petro Poroshenko and Ukrainian prime minister Arseniy Yatsenyuk.
8–10 May	Russia	Moscow	Ban attended the Victory Day military parade. He also met with Russian president Vladimir Putin and the president of Cyprus, Nicos Anastasiades.
15–16 May	United States	Washington, D.C. College Park	Ban met with students at University of Maryland at College Park and held the commencement address at Georgetown University.
15–16 May	South Korea	Seoul; Incheon	Ban met with the president of the Republic of Korea Park Geun-hye and other senior officials. He also attended the 6th Asian Leadership Conference, the UN Global Compact Korea Leader's Summit, the World Education Forum 2015, and the Seoul Digital Forum.
22–23 May	Vietnam	Hanoi	Ban met with Vietnamese president Trương Tấn Sang, Vietnamese prime minister Nguyễn Tấn Dũng, and other senior officials.
24–26 May	Ireland	Tipperary; County Kildare; Dublin	Ban accepted the Tipperary International Peace Award. In County Kildare he visited the Curragh Defence Forces Training Camp. He then met with Irish president Michael D. Higgins and Irish prime minister Enda Kenny in Dublin.
25–28 May	Belgium	Brussels; Leuven	Ban met with EU High Representative Federica Mogherini, Jean-Claude Juncker, President of the European Commission, Donald Tusk, President of the European Council, and other senior officials. He was also awarded an honorary degree from the Katholieke Universiteit Leuven.
7–8 June	Germany	Bonn; Munich; Schloss Elmau	Ban met with German foreign minister Frank-Walter Steinmeier in Bonn. In Munich, he attended a dinner hosted by Horst Seehofer, Minister-President of the State of Bavaria. He then attended the 41st G7 summit.
9 June	Tajikistan	Dushanbe; Nurek	Ban met with Emomali Rahmon, President of Tajikistan, and Muhammad Nawaz Sharif, Prime Minister of Pakistan. He also visited the largest dam of the country in Nurek.
9–10 June	Kazakhstan	Astana	Ban attended the 5th Congress of Leaders of World and Traditional Religions. He also met with Kazakh president Nursultan Nazarbayev and Finnish president Sauli Niinistö.
10–11 June	Kyrgyzstan	Bishkek; Osh	Ban met with the president of Kyrgyzstan, Almazbek Atambaev and with the prime minister of Kyrgyzstan, Temir Sariev.
11–12 June	Uzbekistan	Tashkent; Bukhara	Ban met with Uzbek president Islam Karimov and visited the UNESCO World Heritage Site in Bukhara.
13–14 June	Turkmenistan	Ashgabat	Ban met with the president of Turkmenistan, Gurbanguly Berdimuhamedov
14–15 June	Switzerland	Geneva	Ban attended meetings concerning the war in Yemen.
21–22 June	Luxembourg	Luxembourg	Ban had an audience with Grand Duke Henri of Luxembourg and met with the prime minister of Luxembourg, Xavier Bettel.
25–27 June	United States	San Francisco; Stanford	Ban attended a ceremony to commemorate the 70th anniversary of the United Nations Charter. He also attended a round table meeting with technology entrepreneurs, a round table with United States climate change leaders and met with students of Stanford University.
1–3 July	Barbados	Bridgetown	Ban met with Freundel Stuart, President of Barbados, and attended the meeting of the Caribbean Community. He also attended bilateral meetings with David Granger, President of Guyana, and Kamla Persad-Bissessar, Prime Minister of Trinidad & Tobago.
5–9 July	Norway	Oslo; Longyearbyen; Ny-Ålesund	Ban attended the Global Launch of the Millennium Development Goals Report 2015. He also attended a bilateral meeting with Norwegian prime minister Erna Solberg and had an audience with Crown Prince Haakon of Norway. He then flew to Longyearbyen to meet with polar researchers. He visited the Blomstrandbreen glacier to view the changes since his las visit in 2009.
12–16 July	Ethiopia	Addis Ababa	Ban attended the 3rd International Financing for Development Conference.
4 August	United States	Washington, D.C.	Ban met with the president of the United States, Barack Obama.
23–24 August	Nigeria	Abuja	Ban met with Nigerian president Muhammadu Buhari and attended meetings on how to confront Boko Haram violence.
25–26 August	France	Paris	Ban met with French president François Hollande and attended several events on climate change.
2–6 September	China	Beijing	Ban met with Chinese president Xi Jinping and Chinese prime minister Li Keqiang.
8–10 October	Peru	Lima	Ban attended the annual meetings of the World Bank Group and the International Monetary Fund. He also met with the president of Peru, Ollanta Humala.
10–11 October	Bolivia	Cochabamba; Vila Vila	Ban attended the People's World Conference on Climate Change and the Defence of Life. He also met with Bolivian president, Evo Morales.
14–17 October	Italy	Rome; Turin; Milan	Ban addressed a joint meeting of the Italian Chamber of Senate and Deputies to mark the 60th anniversary of Italy's membership to the United Nations. He also attended the World Forum of Local Economic Development in Turin and visited the Expo 2015 in Milan.
17–20 October	Slovakia	Poprad; Levoča; Spiš Castle; Bratislava; Gabčíkovo	Ban visited Lomnický Peak and the UNESCO World Heritage Sites Levoča and Spiš Castle. He met with Slovak president Andrej Kiska and Slovak prime minister Robert Fico. He was awarded honorary doctorate at the Comenius University in Bratislava and visited the Humanitarian Centre in Gabčíkovo, which houses Syrian refugees.
19–21 October	Israel	Jerusalem	Ban met with Israeli president Reuven Rivlin and Israeli prime minister Benjamin Netanyahu.
21 October	Palestine	Ramallah	Ban met with the president of the State of Palestine Mahmoud Abbas and with the prime minister of the State of Palestine Rami Hamdallah.
21–22 October	Jordan	Amman	Ban met with King Abdullah II of Jordan.
28–30 October	Spain	Madrid; Alcobendas	Ban travelled to Spain to commemorate the 60th anniversary of Spain's membership in the United Nations. He met with Spanish prime minister Mariano Rajoy and King Felipe VI. He also visited a refugee centre in Alcobendas.
30 October – 1 November	Switzerland	Geneva	Ban met with ICRC President Peter Maurer and attended other meetings.
9-11 November	Saudi Arabia	Riyadh	Ban attended the 4th Summit of Arab and South American countries. He also met with King Salman of Saudi Arabia.
9-11 November	Turkey	Antalya	Ban attended the G-20 Summit. This trip included bilateral meetings with Turkish president Recep Tayyip Erdoğan and Brazilian president Dilma Rousseff.
22 November	Malaysia	Kuala Lumpur	Ban attended the Tenth East Asia Summit and the 7th ASEAN-UN Summit. This trip included bilateral meetings with the prime minister of Malaysia, Najib Razak, Indonesian president Joko Widodo, the president of Myanmar, Thein Sein, Lao prime minister Thongsing Thammavong, Australian prime minister Malcolm Turnbull and Russian prime minister Dmitry Medvedev.
26–28 November	Malta	Valletta; Mdina	Ban attended a special session on climate change of the Commonwealth Heads of Government Meeting 2015. This trip included an audience with Queen Elizabeth II, and bilateral meetings with British prime minister David Cameron and the president of Malta, Marie Louise Coleiro Preca.
28 November – 1 December	France	Paris	Ban attended the opening of the 2015 United Nations Climate Change Conference. This trip included bilateral meetings with French president François Hollande and several other world leaders.
4–8 December	France	Paris	Ban attended the 2015 United Nations Climate Change Conference. This trip included bilateral meetings with several world leaders.
8–9 December	Finland	Helsinki	Ban travelled to Finland to commemorate the 60th anniversary of Finland's membership in the United Nations. He met with Finnish president Sauli Niinistö and several other Finnish officials.
9–12 December	France	Paris	Ban attended the 2015 United Nations Climate Change Conference. This trip included bilateral meetings with several world leaders.

== 2016 ==
Date	Countries	Places visited	Narrative
17–19 January	United Arab Emirates	Dubai; Abu Dhabi	Ban attended a Panel on Humanitarian Financing and the World Future Energy Summit. He also held bilateral meetings with Nigerian president Muhammadu Buhari and Vice-President of Yemen Khaled Bahah.
19–22 January	Switzerland	Geneva; Davos; Zürich	Ban met with the WMO director-general Petteri Taalas and WHO director-general Margaret Chan in Geneva. He then travelled to Davos and attended the annual meeting of the World Economic Forum. He also held a number of bilateral meetings with several heads of state. In Zürich he met with Swiss Federal Council Didier Burkhalter and attended the Annual Conference of Swiss Development Cooperation.
28–31 January	Ethiopia	Addis Ababa; Oromia Region	Ban attended the 26th African Union Summit. He held a number of bilateral meetings including the Chairperson of the African Union, Nkosazana Dlamini-Zuma and several African leaders. Before leaving Ethiopia he visited drought affected areas in the Oromia Region.
31 January – 2 February	Oman	Muscat	Ban delivered a lecture at the National Defense College and met with Badr bin Saud al Busaidi, Minister Responsible for Defense, Yusuf bin Alawi bin Abdullah, Minister Responsible for Foreign Affairs, and Fahd bin Mahmoud al Said, Deputy Prime Minister of Oman.
2–5 February	United Kingdom	London; Cambridge	Ban attended the Supporting Syria and the Region Conference 2016 and held bilateral meetings with a number of heads of state. In Cambridge he received an honorary doctorate by the University of Cambridge.
11–13 February	Canada	Ottawa; Montreal	Ban met with Canadian prime minister Justin Trudeau and Canadian governor-general David Johnston. He also held a speech at McGill University and met with representatives of the Mohawk Nation.
21–23 February	Burundi	Bujumbura	Ban met with representatives of Burundi's political parties and with the president of Burundi, Pierre Nkurunziza.
23–25 February	Democratic Republic of the Congo	Goma; Kinshasa	Ban visited a camp for displaced persons in the North Kivu province. In Kinshasa he met with several officials among them Prime Minister Augustin Matata Ponyo and President Joseph Kabila.
25 February	South Sudan	Juba	Ban met with the president of South Sudan, Salva Kiir and spoke with the leader of the opposition, Riek Machar, by phone.
29 February-1 March	Switzerland	Geneva	Ban met with UN Special Envoy for Syria Staffan de Mistura. He also addressed the Human Rights Council and met with representatives of several human rights non-governmental organizations.
1–2 March	Spain	Madrid	Ban met with the Spanish foreign minister José García-Margallo y Marfil.
2–3 March	Burkina Faso	Ouagadougou	Ban met the president of Burkina Faso, Roch Marc Christian Kaboré, and the prime minister of Burkina Faso, Paul Kaba Thieba. He also visited a centre for malnourished children.
3–5 March	Mauritania	Nouakchott	Ban met the president of Mauritania, Mohamed Ould Abdel Aziz. He visited Mauritania to discuss the situation in Western Sahara. He also met with Prime Minister Yahya Ould Hademine.
5–6 March	Algeria	Tindouf; Algiers	Ban visited a refugee camp in the Tindouf area. He met with the secretary-general of the Polisario, Mohamed Abdelaziz to discuss the situation in Western Sahara. In Algiers he met with the Algerian prime minister Abdelmalek Sellal and the president of Algeria, Abdelaziz Bouteflika.
7–8 March	Germany	Baden-Baden; Berlin; Bonn	Ban accepted the German media price in Baden-Baden. He travelled to Berlin to meet with the president of the Parliament, Norbert Lammert and with the German chancellor Angela Merkel. He visited Bonn to mark the 20th anniversary of the United Nations offices in the city.
23 March	Turkey	Istanbul	Ban met with the mayor of Istanbul, Kadir Topbaş.
23–26 March	Lebanon	Beirut; Naqoura; Tripoli; Beqaa Valley	Ban visited the Headquarters of the United Nations Interim Force in Lebanon (UNIFIL) in Naqoura. He met with several Lebanese officials in Beirut. He also travelled to Tripoli to visit a Palestinian refugee camp and to the Beqaa Valley to visit a Syrian refugee settlement.
26 March	Iraq	Baghdad; Erbil	Ban met with Iraqi president Haider al-Abadi. He also laid a wreath to remember the victims of the Canal Hotel attack. He later flew to Erbil to meet with the president of the Kurdistan Regional Government Masoud Barzani and the prime minister of the Kurdistan Regional Government, Nechervan Barzani.
26–28 March	Jordan	Amman	Ban visited the Zaatari refugee camp. He also met with Jordan prime minister Abdullah Ensour and had an audience with King Abdullah II of Jordan. Furthermore he met with the president of the State of Palestine, Mahmoud Abbas.
28–29 March	Tunisia	Tunis	Ban met with the Tunisian president Beji Caid Essebsi, Tunisian prime minister Habib Essid and other Tunisian and regional officials. He also laid a wreath to remember the victims of the Bardo National Museum attack and visited the Carthage ruins.
29–30 March	Switzerland	Geneva	Ban participated in the high-level meeting on Global Responsibility Sharing for Syrian Refugees.
30–31 March	Sweden	Stockholm	Ban delivered the Dag Hammarskjöld lecture and met with Swedish prime minister Stefan Löfven.
31 March-1 April	United States	Washington, D.C.	Ban attended the Nuclear Security Summit and met with French president François Hollande and Ukrainian president Petro Poroshenko.
5–7 April	United States	Los Angeles; Santa Barbara	Ban spoke at the Los Angeles World Affairs Council and received an honorary doctorate from Loyola Marymount University. He travelled to Santa Barbara to attend the "ECO:nomics" conference.
8–10 April	Switzerland	Geneva	Ban attended the Geneva Conference on the Prevention of Violent Extremism, and met with several officials.
12–13 April	United States	New Haven	Ban attended the Global Colloquium of University Presidents at Yale University.
15–16 April	United States	Washington, D.C.	Ban attended the spring meetings of the International Monetary Fund and the World Bank Group. He also met with several international officials.
19–21 April	Netherlands	The Hague; Rotterdam	Ban attended the opening of the new premises of the International Criminal Court. He met with Dutch prime minister Mark Rutte and King Willem-Alexander of the Netherlands. He also visited several international institutions in The Hague. He then travelled to Rotterdam to receive the World Leader Cycle Award at the Erasmus University Rotterdam.
26–29 April	Austria	Vienna	Ban chaired the meeting of the UN System Chief Executives Board for Coordination. He also met with Austrian chancellor Werner Faymann and Austrian president Heinz Fischer.
29 April	Switzerland	Geneva; Lausanne	Ban attended the arrival of the Olympic flame at the Palais des Nations. He then travelled to Lausanne to visit the Olympic Museum.
4–6 May	United States	Washington, D.C.	Ban attended Climate Action 2016 event and met with international leaders.
7–8 May	Seychelles	Victoria; Praslin	Ban visited a nature reserve on Praslin Island. He then met with President James Michel and addressed the Seychelles National Assembly.
8–10 May	Mauritius	Port Louis	Ban met the president of Mauritius, Ameenah Gurib and with Prime Minister Anerood Jugnauth to discuss the implementation of the Sustainable Development Goals in the country. He also met with other officials and visited UNESCO World Heritage Sites Aapravasi Ghat and Le Morne Brabant.
10–11 May	Madagascar	Antananarivo	Ban met with the president of Madagascar, Hery Rajaonarimampianina to discuss the human rights and humanitarian situation in the country. He also visited a United Nations-supported development project.
12–13 May	Portugal	Lisbon	Met with President Marcelo Rebelo de Sousa, Prime Minister António Costa, and Foreign Minister Augusto Santos Silva; Visited the Champalimaud Foundation
20–22 May	Qatar	Doha	Met with the Qatari Prime Minister, Sheikh Abdullah bin Nasser bin Khalifa Al Thani; Held a trilateral meeting with the Emir of Qatar, Tamim bin Hamad Al Thani, and the president of Yemen, Abdrabbuh Mansur Hadi; Addressed the Doha Forum; Met with Ashraf Ghani, President of Afghanistan
22–24 May	Turkey	Istanbul	Attended the World Humanitarian Summit
22–24 May	South Korea	Jeju Island	Attended the Jeju Peace Forum; Met with President Hwang Kyo-ahn
26–27 May	Japan	Nagoya, Shima	Met with the president of Vietnam, Nguyễn Xuân Phúc, and the prime minister of Papua New Guinea, Peter O'Neill; Attended the 42nd G7 summit
27–29 May	South Korea	Seoul, Andong, Gyeongju	Attended the Rotary International Convention; Visited the Hahoe Folk Village
3 June	France	Paris	Attended a French ministerial conference meeting on the Middle East; Met with United States Secretary of State, John Kerry
13–15 June	Belgium	Brussels	Attended the European Development Days Forum; Met with the president of the European Council, Donald Tusk, the president of the European Parliament, Martin Schulz, and the president of the European Commission, Jean-Claude Juncker; Met with Kenyan President Uhuru Kenyatta, and Ethiopian prime minister Hailemariam Desalegn; Received the Grand Cordon of the Order of Leopold from King Philippe of Belgium and Queen Mathilde of Belgium
15–17 June	Russia	Saint Petersburg	Attended the St. Petersburg International Economic Forum; Met Guinean president Alpha Condé, Russian foreign minister Sergey Lavrov, Russian president Vladimir Putin, and Kazakh president Nursultan Nazarbayev; Visited the Hermitage Museum
15–17 June	Greece	Athens, Mytilene	Met with Greek president Prokopis Pavlopoulos, and Prime Minister Alexis Tsipras; Visited the Moria refugee camp and the Kara Tepe refugee camp
5 August	Brazil	Rio de Janeiro	Ban assisted with the opening ceremony of the 2016 Summer Olympics.
