= Jeju Peace Institute =

South Korean think tank

The Jeju Peace Institute
- Abbreviation: JPI
- Formation: 2006
- Type: Think Tank in Peace and conflict studies, Foreign & Security Policy
- Location: Seogwipo Jeju Province South Korea
- President: SUH Chung-ha(2016- )
- Website: http://eng.jpi.or.kr/

The Jeju Peace Institute (JPI; Korean: 제주평화연구원; Hanja: 濟州平和硏究院) is a South Korean think tank that was created in 2006 as research institution devoted to the study and promotion of peace on the Korean Peninsula and to foster regional cooperation in East Asia. It is located in the International Peace Center, the Jungmun Tourism Complex, which is on the southern coast of Jeju Island.

== Purpose and background ==
The Jeju Peace Institute was founded with three goals: to promote the vision of Northeast Asia as a region of unity and cooperation, to raise Jeju Island's stature as an Island of World Peace, and to become a leading organization in peace research and programs throughout Asia and the world. JPI's mission of fostering understanding is not exclusive to international politics, and help the people of Jeju strengthen their relationship with the mainland. Its purpose also promotes the use of economic-political diplomacy in achieving stable peace.

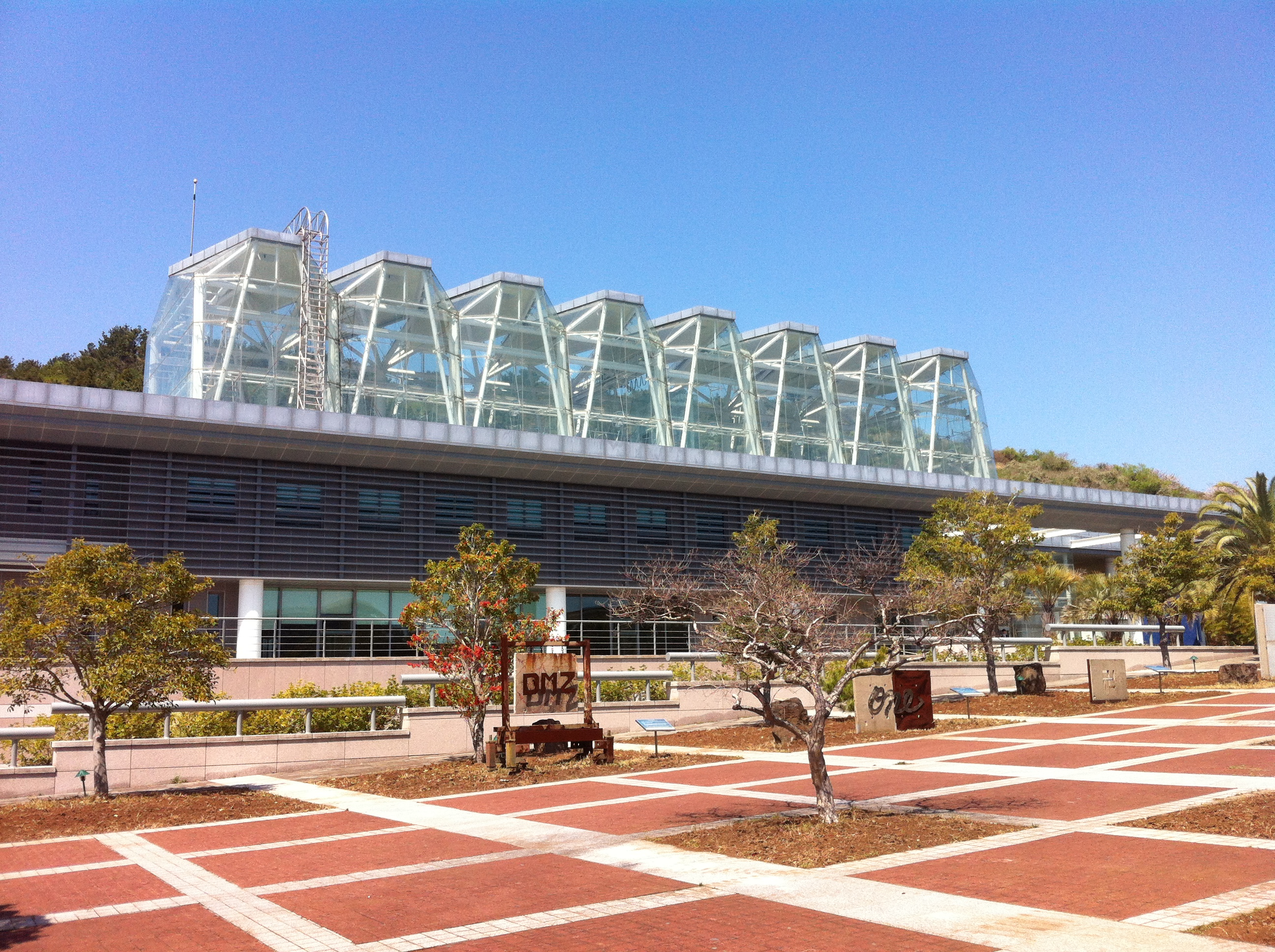
Jeju Peace Institute in International Peace Center, Jeju

== Legal status ==
The Jeju International Peace Foundation had its first general meeting in January 2006 to establish and organize management for the Jeju Peace Institute. JPI became operational in the same month by filing its article of association with the Jeju Regional Court as a non-profit organization.

== Source of operating funds ==
JPI's operating budget is to come from a planned 20 billion won foundation fund. The fund was fully made up by 2008 with funding from the Ministry of Foreign Affairs and Trade, Republic of Korea, the Jeju provincial government and donations from the private sector.

== Organization ==
The Jeju International Peace Foundation, a financier of Jeju Peace Institute, is headed by 2nd Vice Minister of Foreign Affairs, Republic of Korea. The board members include president of Northeast Asian History Foundation, the president of Jeju National University, the lieutenant governor for administrative affairs of Jeju Province, the chairman of the Jeju Free International City Development Center, and the managing director of the East Asia Foundation, president of JPI and director of Jeju International Training Center affiliated with UNITAR. JPI employs a small staff made up of experts in their fields based on two departments: Planning and Coordination, and Research.

== Publication ==
JPI regularly publishes on and off-line materials to disseminate research findings and conference results to major institutions, interested individuals and experts.

- JPI Policy Forum
- JPI PeaceNet
- Jeju Forum Reports
- Research Reports

== Organizer of Jeju Peace Forum ==
Jeju Peace Forum (Jeju Forum for Peace and Prosperity) held in May as an annual meeting is organized by the permanent secretariat in the Jeju Peace Institute.
