= Ban Ki-moon =

UN Secretary-General from 2007 to 2016

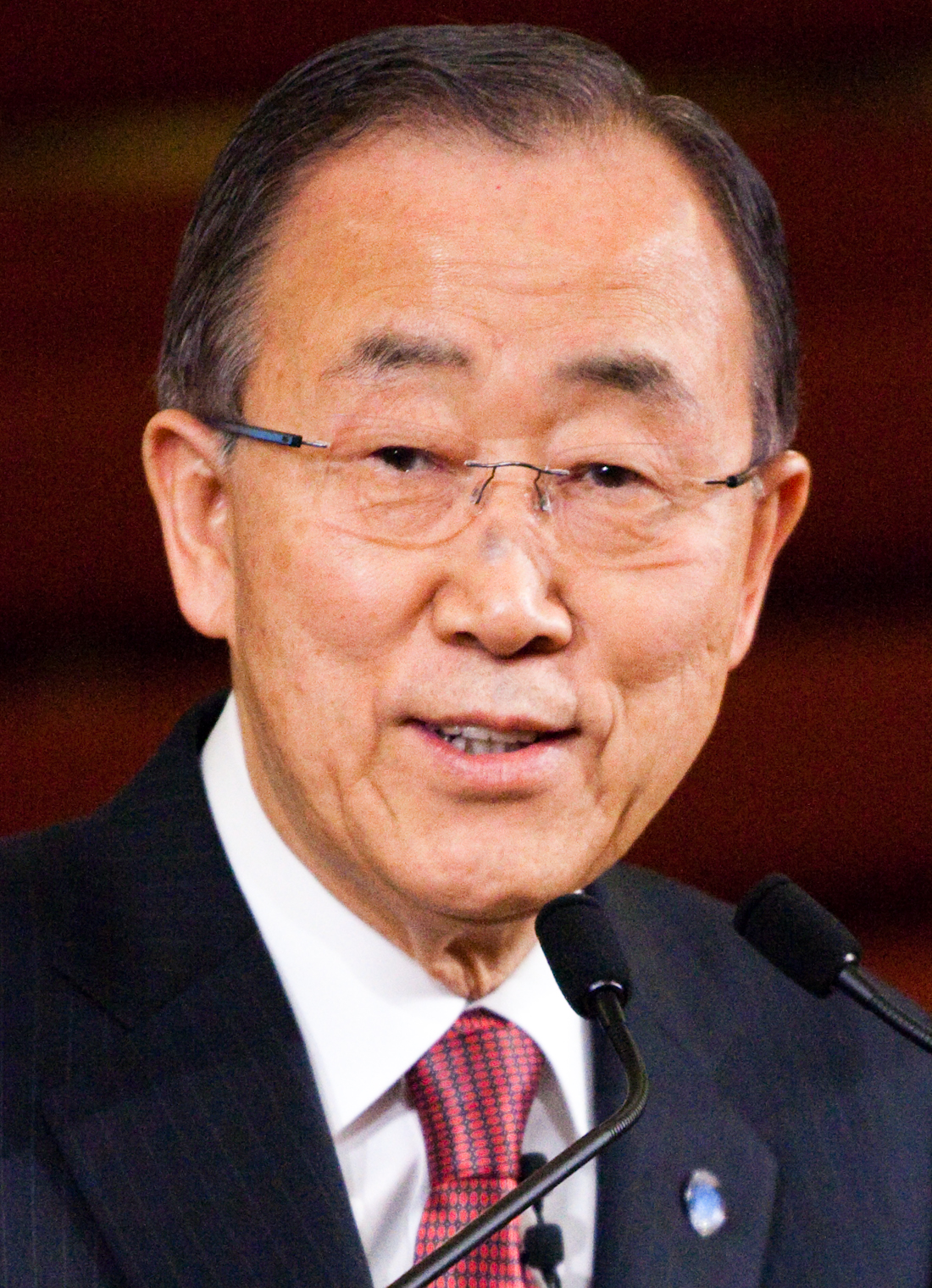
- Ban in 2016

8th Secretary-General of the United Nations
- In office 1 January 2007 – 31 December 2016
- Deputy: Asha-Rose Migiro; Jan Eliasson
- Preceded by: Kofi Annan
- Succeeded by: António Guterres

Minister of Foreign Affairs and Trade
- In office 17 January 2004 – 10 November 2006
- President: Roh Moo-hyun
- Preceded by: Yoon Young-kwan
- Succeeded by: Song Min-soon

Personal details
- Born: 13 June 1944 (age 82) Insei, Chūseihoku Province, Korea, Empire of Japan
- Party: Independent
- Spouse: Yoo Soon-taek (m. 1971)
- Children: 3
- Education: Seoul National University (BA); Harvard University (MPA)
- Ban Ki-moon's voice Ban addressing the Universal Postal Union; Recorded 13 April 2015; Ban Ki-moon voice.ogg

Korean name
- Hangul: 반기문
- Hanja: 潘基文
- RR: Ban Gimun
- MR: Pan Kimun
- IPA: [pan.ɡi.mun]

Ban Ki-moon (Korean: 반기문; born 13 June 1944) is a South Korean politician and diplomat who served as the eighth Secretary-General of the United Nations between 2007 and 2016. Prior to his appointment as secretary-general, Ban was the South Korean minister of foreign affairs and trade between 2004 and 2006. Ban was initially considered to be a long shot for the office of Secretary-General of the United Nations; he began to campaign for the office in February 2006. As the foreign minister of South Korea, he was able to travel to all the countries on the United Nations Security Council, a manoeuvre that subsequently turned him into the campaign's front-runner.

On 13 October 2006, Ban was elected as the eighth secretary-general by the United Nations General Assembly. On 1 January 2007, he succeeded Kofi Annan. Diplomatically, Ban has taken particularly strong views on global warming, pressing the issue repeatedly with U.S. president George W. Bush, and on the Darfur conflict, where he helped persuade Sudanese president Omar al-Bashir to allow peacekeeping troops to enter Sudan.

António Guterres was appointed by the General Assembly on 13 October 2016 to be the successor of Ban Ki-moon as he exited on 31 December 2016. On 14 September 2017, Ban was elected chair of the International Olympic Committee's Ethics Commission. Also in 2017, Ban co-founded the nonprofit Ban Ki-moon Centre for Global Citizens. He also currently serves as the Distinguished Chair Professor at Yonsei University's Institute for Global Engagement and Empowerment.

On 20 February 2018, Ban was unanimously elected as the president of the Assembly and chair of the council of the Global Green Growth Institute (GGGI). Ban also served as co-chair of the Global Center on Adaptation from 2018 to 2026, which has taken forward the work of the Global Commission on Adaptation through its programmes. In March 2026, the organisation announced the conclusion of his tenure as founding chair and that he would assume the role of GCA Chair Emeritus. He became the first major international diplomat to back the Green New Deal, a nascent effort by the progressive wing of the Democratic Party in the United States to zero out planet-warming emissions and end poverty over the next decade.

== Early life and education ==
Ban was born on 13 June 1944 in the small farming village of Haengchi, Wonnam Township (-myeon), in Insei, Chūseihoku Province, Korea, Empire of Japan (now North Chungcheong Province, South Korea). He is of the Gwangju Ban clan. His family then moved to the nearby town of Chungju, where he grew up. During Ban's childhood, his father had a warehouse business, but the warehouse went bankrupt and the family lost its middle-class standard of living. When Ban was six, his family fled to a remote mountainside for much of the Korean War. After the war ended, his family returned to Chungju. Ban has said that, during this time, he met American soldiers.

During his secondary school education at Chungju High School, Ban was part of the local Scout movement while he also became a star student, particularly in his studies of the English language. In 1962, Ban won an essay contest sponsored by the Red Cross and earned a trip to the United States where he lived in San Francisco with a host family for several months. As part of the trip, Ban met U.S. President John F. Kennedy. When a journalist at the meeting asked Ban what he wanted to be when he grew up, he said, "I want to become a diplomat."

Ban graduated from Seoul National University in 1970 with a bachelor's degree in international relations. He subsequently went on to complete a Master of Public Administration degree at the John F. Kennedy School of Government at Harvard University in 1985. At Harvard, he studied under Joseph Nye, who remarked that Ban had "a rare combination of analytic clarity, humility and perseverance."

In addition to his native Korean, Ban speaks English and French. According to a retired UN official, "one of Ban's biggest handicaps was his lack of fluency in English, which made it difficult for him to win over audiences in the US and elsewhere." There have also been questions, however, regarding the extent of his knowledge of French, one of the two working languages of the United Nations Secretariat.

== Career ==
=== Diplomatic career ===
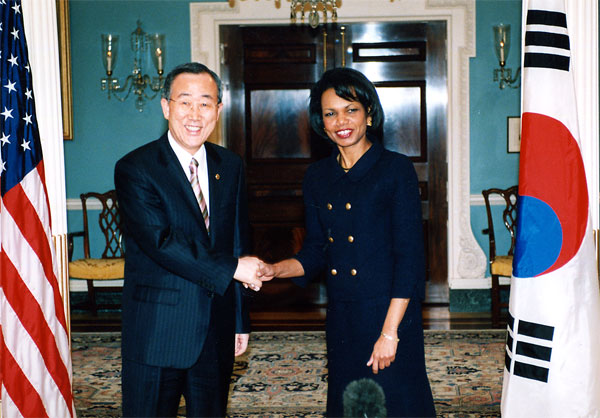
Ban, left, with U.S. Secretary of State Condoleezza Rice in January 2006

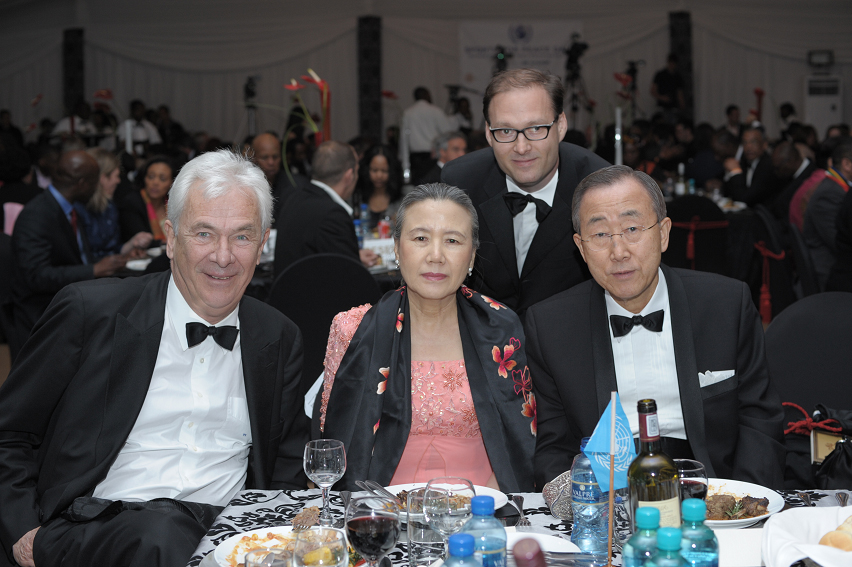
Left to right: Peter Krämer, Yoo Soon-taek, Jaka Bizilj, and Ban at Sports for Peace in July 2010

After graduating from university, Ban received the top score on Korea's foreign service exam. He joined the Ministry of Foreign Affairs in May 1970 and worked his way up the career ladder during the years of the Yusin Constitution.

Ban's first overseas posting was to New Delhi, India, where he served as vice consul and impressed many of his superiors in the foreign ministry with his competence. Ban reportedly accepted a posting to India rather than the United States, because in India he would be able to save more money to send to his family. In 1974 he received his first posting to the United Nations, as First Secretary of the South Permanent Observer Mission (South Korea became a full UN member-state on 17 September 1991). After Park Chung Hee's 1979 assassination, Ban assumed the post of director of the United Nations Division.

In 1980, Ban became director of the United Nations' International Organizations and Treaties Bureau, headquartered in Seoul. He has been posted twice to the South Korean embassy to the U.S. in Washington, D. C. Between these two appointments, he served as Director-General for American Affairs in 1990–92. In 1992, he became Vice Chairman of the South-North Joint Nuclear Control Commission, following the adoption by South and North Korea of the Joint Declaration of the Denuclearization of the Korean Peninsula. From 1993 to 1994 Ban was Korea's deputy ambassador to the United States. He was promoted to the position of deputy minister for policy planning and international organisations in 1995 and then appointed national security advisor to the president in 1996. Ban's lengthy career overseas has been credited with helping him avoid South Korea's unforgiving political environment.

Ban was appointed ambassador to Austria and Slovenia in 1998, and a year later he was also elected as chairman of the Preparatory Commission for the Comprehensive Nuclear-Test-Ban Treaty Organization (CTBTO PrepCom). During the negotiations, in what Ban considers the biggest blunder of his career, he included in a public letter a positive statement about the Anti-Ballistic Missile Treaty in 2001, not long after the United States had decided to abandon the treaty. To avoid anger from the United States, Ban was fired by President Kim Dae-jung, who also issued a public apology for Ban's statement.

Ban was unemployed for the only time in his career and was expecting to receive an assignment to work in a remote and unimportant embassy. In 2001, during the 56th Session of the United Nations General Assembly, South Korea held the rotating presidency, and to Ban's surprise, he was selected to be the chief of staff to general assembly president Han Seung-soo. In 2003, incoming president Roh Moo-hyun selected Ban as one of his foreign policy advisors.

==== Foreign minister of South Korea ====
In 2004, Ban replaced the resigning Yoon Young-kwan as foreign minister of South Korea under president Roh Moo-hyun. At the beginning of his term, Ban was faced with two major crises: in June 2004 Kim Sun-il, a South Korean working as an Arabic translator, was kidnapped and killed in Iraq by Islamic extremists; and in December 2004 dozens of Koreans died in the 2004 Indian Ocean tsunami. Ban survived scrutiny from lawmakers and saw an upturn in his popularity when talks began with North Korea. Ban became actively involved in issues relating to North-South Korean relationships. In September 2005, as foreign minister, he played a leading role in the diplomatic efforts to adopt the Joint Statement on resolving the North Korean nuclear issue at the fourth round of the Six-party talks held in Beijing.

As foreign minister, Ban oversaw the trade and aid policies of South Korea. This work put Ban in the position of signing trade deals and delivering foreign assistance to diplomats who would later be influential in his candidacy for secretary-general. For example, Ban became the first senior South Korean minister to travel to the Republic of the Congo since its independence in 1960.

=== United Nations career ===
==== Campaign for secretary-general: 2007 ====
2007 Secretary-General candidates
Nationality	Name	Position
(South Korea)	Ban Ki-moon	South Korean foreign minister
(India)	Shashi Tharoor	Under-Secretary-General of the United Nations for public information; from India
(Latvia)	Vaira Vīķe-Freiberga	President of Latvia
(Afghanistan)	Ashraf Ghani	Chancellor of Kabul University, Afghanistan
(Thailand)	Surakiart Sathirathai	Deputy prime minister of Thailand
(Jordan)	Prince Zeid bin Ra'ad	Jordan's ambassador to the United Nations
(Sri Lanka)	Jayantha Dhanapala	Former Under-Secretary-General for disarmament; from Sri Lanka

In February 2006, Ban declared his candidacy to replace Kofi Annan as UN Secretary-General at the end of 2006, becoming the first South Korean to run for the office. Though Ban was the first to announce a candidacy, he was not originally considered a serious contender.

Over the next eight months, Ban made ministerial visits to each of the 15 countries with a seat on the Security Council. Of the seven candidates, he topped each of the four straw polls conducted by the United Nations Security Council: on 24 July, 14 September, 28 September, and 2 October.

During the period in which these polls took place, Ban made major speeches to the Asia Society and the Council on Foreign Relations in New York City. To be confirmed, Ban needed not only to win the support of the diplomatic community, but also to be able to avoid a veto from any of the five permanent members of the council: People's Republic of China, France, Russia, the United Kingdom, and the United States. Ban was popular in Washington for having pushed to send South Korean troops to Iraq, and had the support of the Bush administration as he pursued the position. But Ban also opposed several U.S. positions: he expressed his support for the International Criminal Court (ICC), and favoured an entirely non-confrontational approach to dealing with North Korea. Ban said during his campaign that he would like to visit North Korea in person to meet with Kim Jong Il directly. Ban was viewed as a stark contrast from Kofi Annan, who was considered charismatic, but perceived as a weak manager because of problems surrounding the UN's oil-for-food program in Iraq.

Ban struggled to win the approval of France. His official biography states that he speaks both English and French, the two working languages of the UN Secretariat. However, he has repeatedly struggled to answer questions in French from journalists. Ban has repeatedly acknowledged his limitations at French, but assured French diplomats that he was devoted to continuing his study. At a press conference on 11 January 2007, Ban remarked, "My French perhaps could be improved, and I am continuing to work. I have taken French lessons over the last few months. I think that, even if my French isn't perfect, I will continue to study it."

As the secretary-general election drew closer, there was rising criticism of the South Korean campaign on Ban's behalf. Specifically, his alleged practice of systematically visiting all member states of the Security Council in his role as the Minister of Foreign Affairs and Trade to secure votes in his support by signing trade deals with European countries and pledging aid to developing countries was the focus of many news articles. According to The Washington Post, "rivals have privately grumbled that Republic of Korea, which has the world's 11th-largest economy, has wielded its economic might to generate support for his candidacy". Ban reportedly said that these insinuations were "groundless". In an interview on 17 September 2006 he stated: "As front-runner, I know that I can become a target of this very scrutinising process", and that he was "a man of integrity".

In the final informal poll on 2 October, Ban received fourteen favourable votes and one abstention ("no opinion") from the fifteen members of the Security Council. The one abstention came from the Japanese delegation, who vehemently opposed the idea of a Korean taking the role of secretary-general. Due to the overwhelming support of Ban by the rest of the Security Council, Japan later voted in favour of Ban to avoid controversy. More importantly, Ban was the only one to escape a veto; each of the other candidates received at least one "no" vote from among the five permanent members. After the vote, Shashi Tharoor, who finished second, withdrew his candidacy and China's Permanent Representative to the UN told reporters that "it is quite clear from today's straw poll that Minister Ban Ki-moon is the candidate that the Security Council will recommend to the General Assembly".

On 9 October, the Security Council formally chose Ban as its nominee. In the public vote, he was supported by all 15 members of the council. On 13 October, the 192-member General Assembly acclaimed Ban as secretary-general.

Ban joked about his nomination at a December gala for UN correspondents. He invoked the film Casino Royale, which was in theatres at time, stating "The name is Ban. Not James Ban. But I am coming in '07." as well as hesitatingly singing a modified rendition of Santa Claus Is Coming To Town; "I'm making a list, I'm checking it twice, I'm going to find out who's naughty or nice. Ban Ki-moon is coming to town!".

==== First term as secretary-general ====
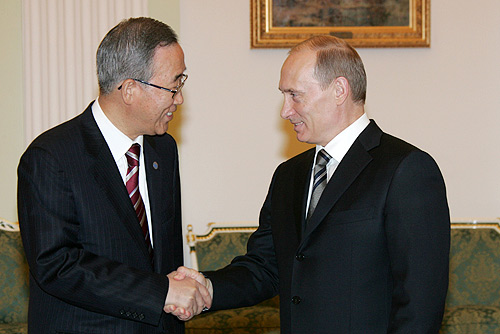
Ban Ki-moon with the President of Russia Vladimir Putin in Moscow in April 2008

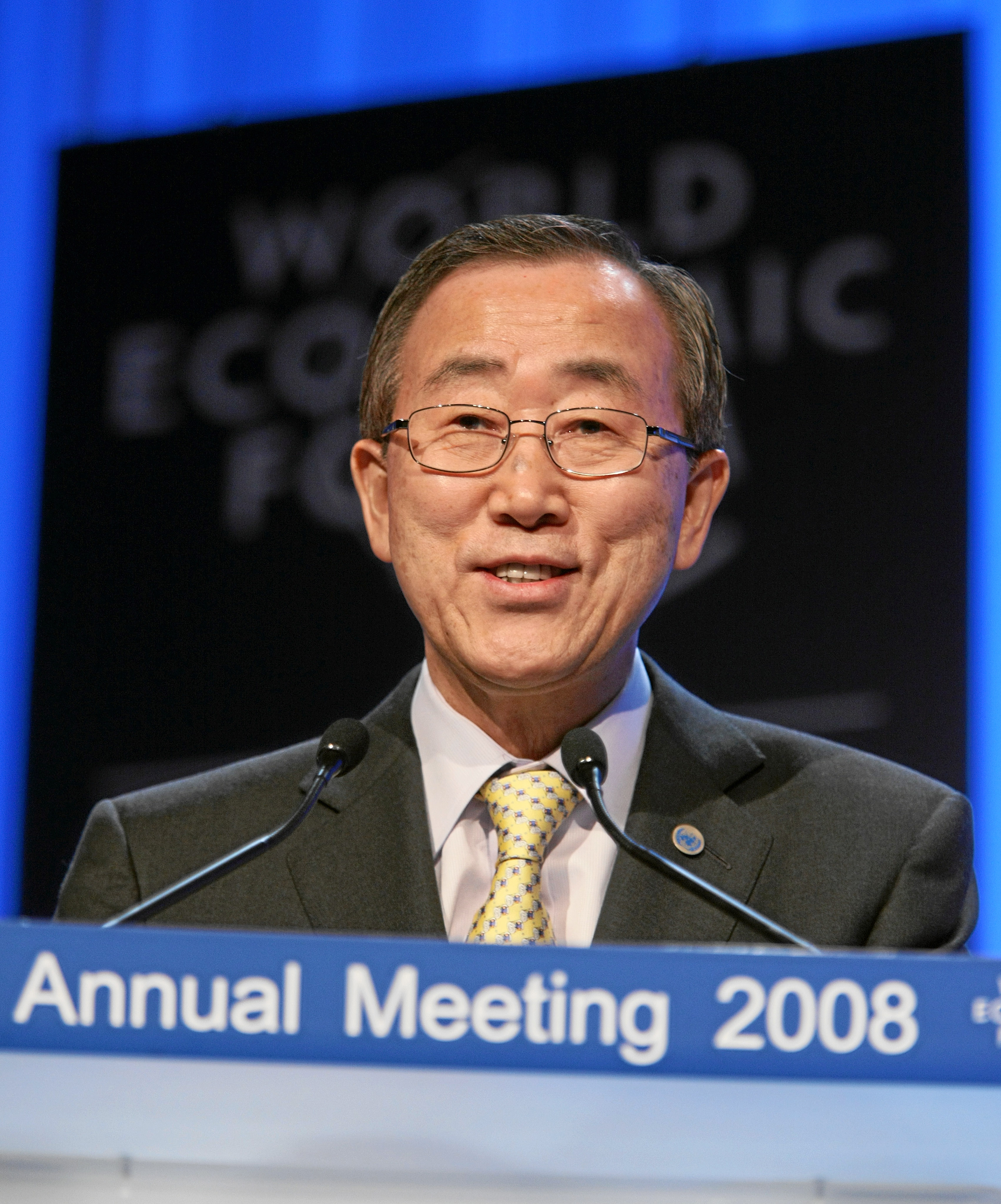
Ban Ki-moon at Davos, Switzerland in the World Economic Forum.

When Ban became secretary-general, The Economist listed the major challenges facing him in 2007: "rising nuclear demons in Iran and North Korea, a hemorrhaging wound in Darfur, unending violence in the Middle East, looming environmental disaster, escalating international terrorism, the proliferation of weapons of mass destruction, the spread of HIV/AIDS. And then the more parochial concerns, such as the largely unfinished business of the most sweeping attempt at reform in the UN's history". Before starting, Kofi Annan shared the story that when the first Secretary-General Trygve Lie left office, he told his successor, Dag Hammarskjöld, "You are about to take over the most impossible job on earth".

On 23 January 2007, Ban took office as the eighth Secretary-General of the United Nations. Ban's term as Secretary-General opened with a flap. At his first encounter with the press as Secretary-General on 2 January 2007, he refused to condemn the death penalty imposed on Saddam Hussein by the Iraqi High Tribunal, remarking, "The issue of capital punishment is for each and every member State to decide". Ban's statements contradicted long-standing United Nations opposition to the death penalty as a human-rights concern. He quickly clarified his stance in the case of Barzan al-Tikriti and Awad al-Bandar, two top officials who were convicted of the deaths of 148 Shia Muslims in the Iraqi village of Dujail in the 1980s. In a statement through his spokesperson on 6 January, he "strongly urged the Government of Iraq to grant a stay of execution to those whose death sentences may be carried out in the near future". On the broader issue, he told a Washington, D.C. audience on 16 January 2007 that he recognised and encouraged the "growing trend in international society, international law and domestic policies and practices to phase out eventually the death penalty".

On the tenth anniversary of Khmer Rouge leader Pol Pot's death, 15 April 2008, Ban Ki-moon appealed for the senior leaders of the regime to be brought to justice. The Extraordinary Chambers in the Courts of Cambodia-tribunal, which was established by both the United Nations and Cambodia, and which became operational in 2006, is responsible for prosecuting the aforementioned senior leaders.

Ban has received strong criticism from the UN Office of Internal Oversight Services (OIOS), which stated that the secretariat under Ban's leadership was "drifting into irrelevance".

===== Cabinet =====
In early January, Ban appointed the key members of his cabinet. As his Deputy Secretary-General, he selected Tanzanian foreign minister and professor Asha-Rose Migiro, a move that pleased African diplomats who had concerns about losing power without Annan in office.

The top position devoted exclusively to management, Under-Secretary-General for Management, was filled by Alicia Bárcena Ibarra of Mexico. Bárcena was considered a UN insider, having previously served as Annan's chief of staff. Her appointment was seen by critics as an indication that Ban would not make dramatic changes to UN bureaucracy. Ban appointed Sir John Holmes, the British Ambassador to France, as Under-Secretary-General for humanitarian affairs and coordinator of emergency relief.

Ban initially said that he would delay making other appointments until his first round of reforms were approved, yet later abandoned this idea after receiving criticism. In February he continued with appointments, selecting B. Lynn Pascoe, the U.S. ambassador to Indonesia, to become Under-Secretary-General for political affairs. Jean-Marie Guéhenno, a French diplomat, who had served as Under-Secretary-General for peacekeeping operations under Annan, remained in office. Ban selected Vijay K. Nambiar as his chief of staff. Nambiar later stepped down in 2012, and was replaced by Susana Malcorra of Argentina, who served as chief of staff from April 2012 to November 2016.

The appointment of many women to top jobs was seen as fulfilling a campaign promise Ban had made to increase the role of women in the United Nations. During Ban's first year as secretary-general, more top jobs were being handled by women than ever before. Though not appointed by Ban, the president of the General Assembly, Haya Rashed Al-Khalifa, is only the third woman to hold this position in United Nations history.

===== Reform agenda =====
During his first month in office, Ban proposed two major reforms: to split the UN peacekeeping operation into two departments and to combine the political affairs and disarmament department. His proposals were met with stiff resistance from members of the UN General Assembly who bristled at Ban's request for rapid approval. The proposed merger of the disarmament and political affairs offices was criticized by many in the developing world, partially because of rumours that Ban hoped to place U.S. B. Lynn Pascoe in charge of the new office. Alejandro D. Wolff, then acting American ambassador, said the United States backed his proposals.

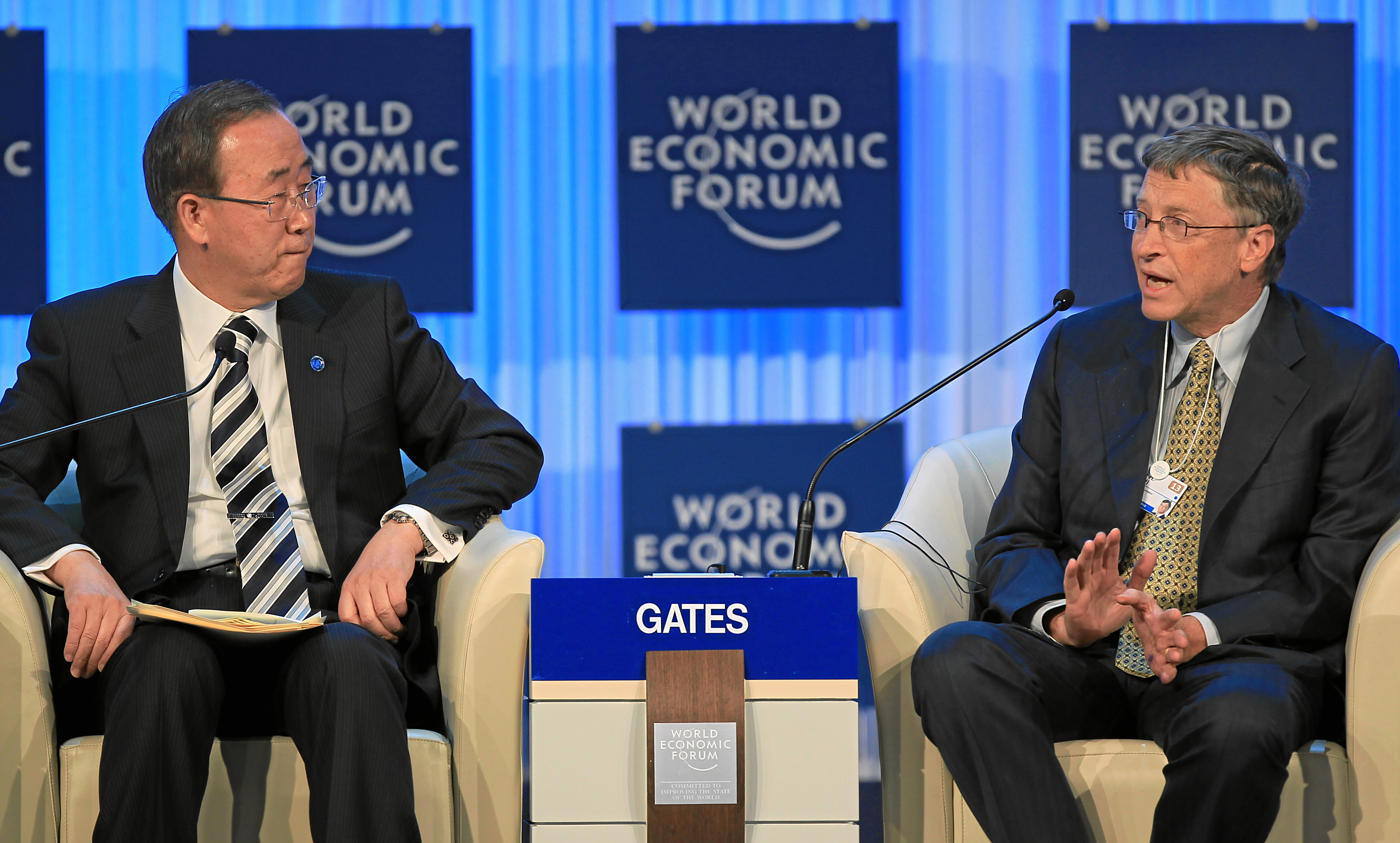
Ban Ki-moon with Bill Gates, World Economic Forum, 24 January 2013

After the early bout of reproach, Ban began extensive consultation with UN ambassadors, agreeing to have his peacekeeping proposal extensively vetted. After the consultations, Ban dropped his proposal to combine political affairs and disarmament. Ban nevertheless pressed ahead with reforms on job requirements at the UN requiring that all positions be considered five-year appointments, all receive strict annual performance reviews, and all financial disclosures be made public. Though unpopular in the New York office, the move was popular in other UN offices around the world and lauded by UN observers. Ban's proposal to split the peacekeeping operation into one group handling operations and another handling arms was finally adopted in mid-March 2007.

===== Key issues =====
The Secretary-General of the United Nations has the ability to influence debate on nearly any global issue. Although unsuccessful in some areas, Ban's predecessor Annan had been successful in increasing the UN peacekeeping presence and in popularizing the Millennium Development Goals. UN observers were eager to see on which issues Ban intended to focus, in addition to his declared interest in reforming the United Nations bureaucracy.

On several prominent issues, such as proliferation in Iran and North Korea, Ban has deferred to the Security Council. In 2007, the Republic of Nauru raised the issue of allowing the Republic of China (Taiwan) to sign the Convention on the Elimination of All Forms of Discrimination Against Women. Ban referenced the United Nations General Assembly Resolution 2758, and refused the motion. On 19 July 2007, Taiwanese President Chen Shui-bian wrote to request admission into the UN by the name Taiwan. Ban rejected the request, stating that Resolution 2758 defined Taiwan as part of China.

====== Global warming ======
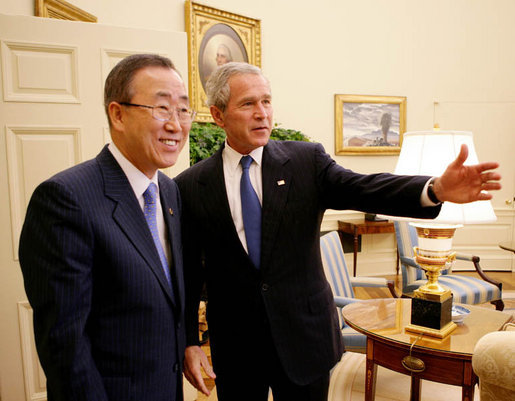
U.S. President George W. Bush talks with United Nations Secretary-General Ban Ki-moon of South Korea in October 2006. In their early meetings, Ban stressed the importance of confronting global warming.

Ban early on identified global warming as one of the key issues of his administration. In a White House meeting with U.S. President George W. Bush in January, Ban urged Bush to take steps to curb greenhouse gas emissions. On 1 March 2007 in a speech before the UN General Assembly, Ban emphasized his concerns about global warming. Ban stated, "For my generation, coming of age at the height of the Cold War, fear of nuclear winter seemed the leading existential threat on the horizon. But the danger posed by war to all humanity—and to our planet—is at least matched by climate change" (referring to Global Warming, see P:GW portal). On 3 September 2009, he further emphasised his concerns at the World Climate Conference in Geneva, when he stated, "Our foot is stuck on the accelerator and we are heading towards an abyss". In September 2014, Ban joined demonstrators in the People's Climate March in New York City, and also called together world leaders for the UN Climate Summit, in preparation for the United Nations Climate Change Conference to be held in Paris in late 2015.

====== Middle East ======
On Thursday, 22 March 2007, while Ban was taking part in the first stop of a tour of the Middle East, a mortar attack hit just 80 meters (260 ft) from where the Secretary-General was standing, interrupting a press conference in Baghdad's Green Zone, and visibly shaking Ban and others. No one was hurt in the incident. The United Nations had already limited its role in Iraq after its Baghdad headquarters was bombed in August 2003, killing 22 people. Ban said, however, that he still hoped to find a way for the United Nations to "do more for Iraqi social and political development".

On his trip, Ban visited Egypt, Israel, the West Bank, Jordan, Lebanon, and Saudi Arabia, where Ban attended a conference with leaders of the Arab League and met for several hours with Omar Hassan al-Bashir, the Sudanese president who had resisted UN peacekeepers in Darfur. While Ban met with Mahmoud Abbas, the Palestinian president, he declined to meet with Ismail Haniyeh of Hamas.

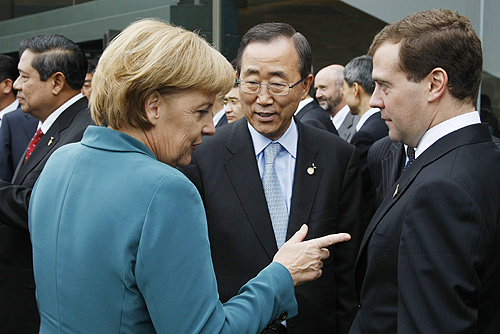
Ban with German Chancellor Angela Merkel and Russian President Dmitry Medvedev at the 34th G8 Summit, July 2008

Ban Ki-moon criticized Israel on 10 March 2008 for planning to build housing units in a West Bank settlement, saying the decision conflicts with "Israel's obligation under the road map" for Middle East peace.

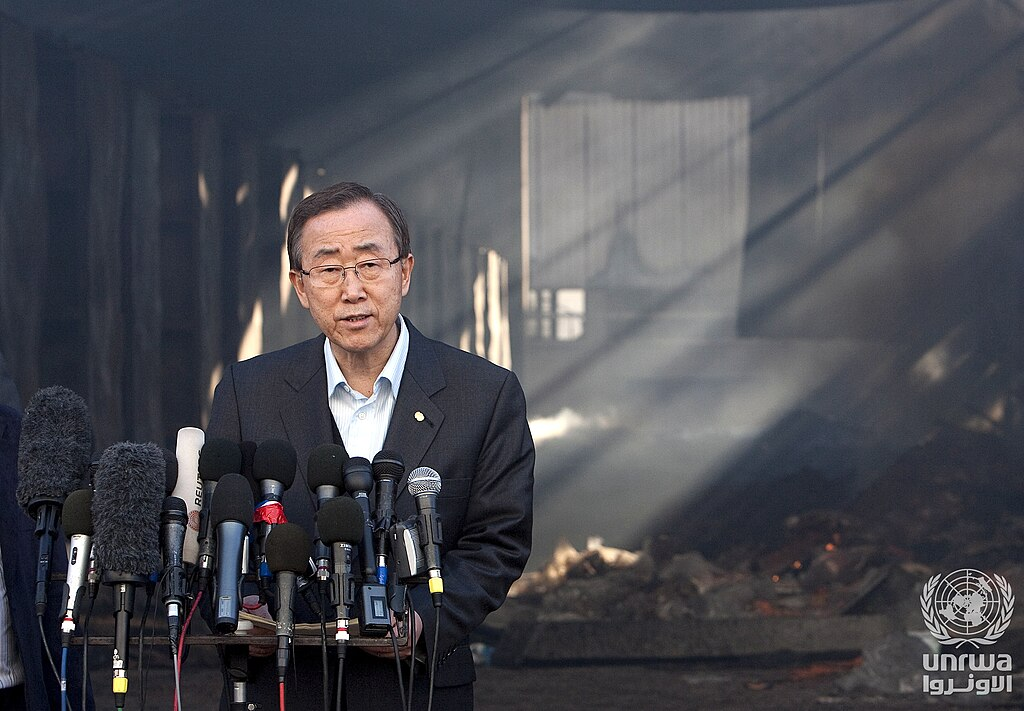
Ban ki-Moon visiting Gaza in 2009

During a meeting of the UN Security Council on Wednesday, 7 January 2009, Ban called for an immediate end to fighting in the Gaza Strip. He criticised both sides, Israel for bombarding Gaza and Hamas for firing rockets into Israel.

Although the 2009 Iranian presidential election was widely disputed, Ban Ki-moon sent a traditional congratulation message to the Iranian president upon his inauguration. He kept silent over the request of Shirin Ebadi to visit Iran after the crackdown on peaceful post-election protests by the Iranian police, which was perceived as a crime against humanity. More than 4,000 people were arrested and nearly 70 were killed, some while being held in prison. In another incident, several prominent intellectuals, including Akbar Ganji, Hamid Dabashi, and Noam Chomsky, went on a three-day hunger strike in front of the UN. The incident was followed by an official request by more than 200 intellectuals, human rights activists and reformist politicians in Iran for the UN reaction. Ban Ki-moon however did not take any action to stop the violence in Iran.

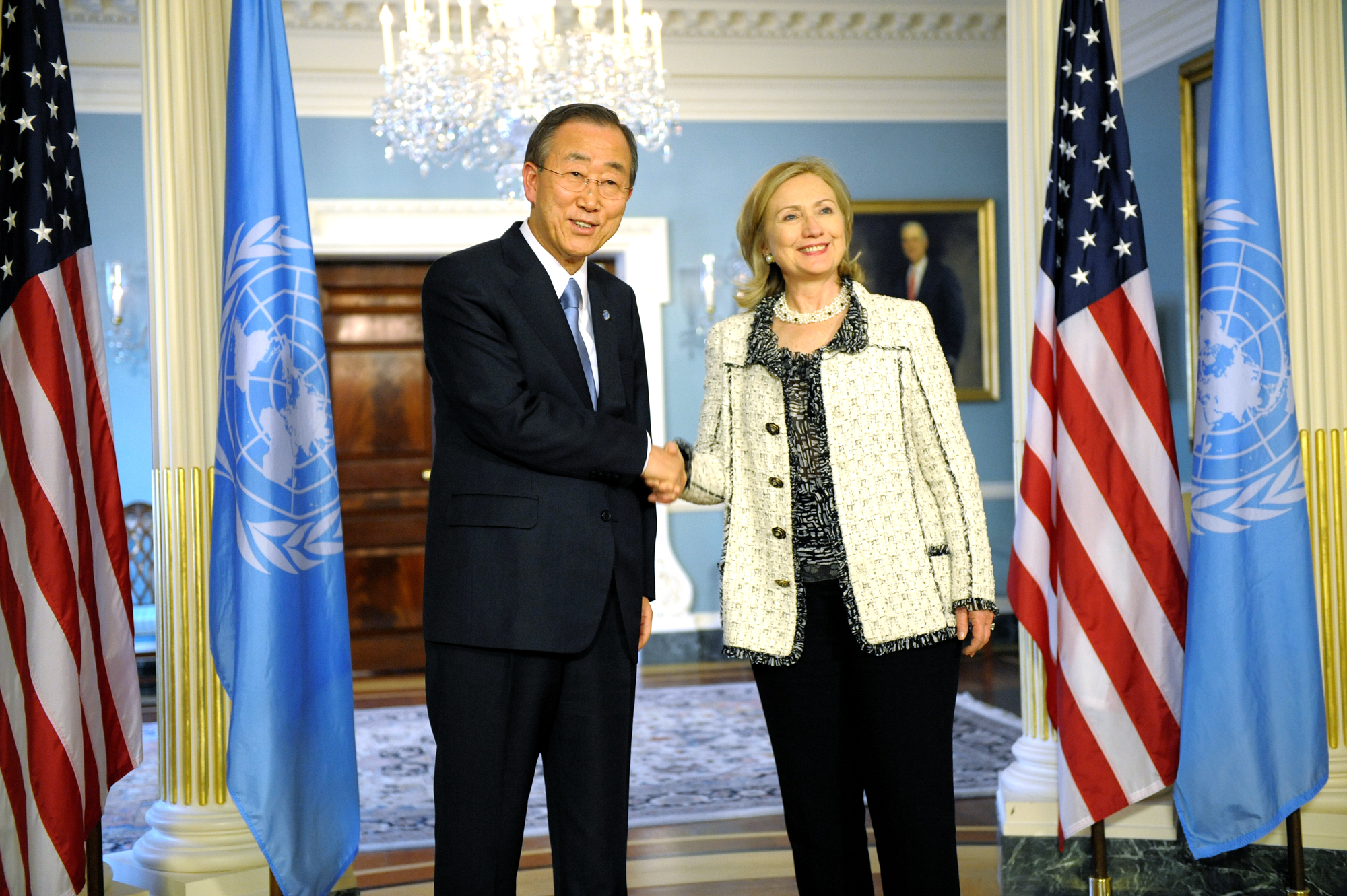
U.S. Secretary of State Hillary Clinton with Ban Ki-Moon, 7 April 2011

The Libyan Civil War began in 2011, the last year of Ban's first term, and dominated his attention and public statements that year. Throughout the conflict, he lobbied for peaceful solutions to the crisis. He frequently spoke out against military action in Libya, believing that a diplomatic solution would be possible and preferable. However, he conceded that if then-leader Muammar Gaddafi refused to abide by a cease fire agreement, the international coalition of military forces would have no choice but to intervene to protect the human rights of Libyans. The Gaddafi government was eventually overthrown and Gaddafi killed in the conflict.

====== Darfur ======
Ban took the first foreign trip of his term to attend the African Union summit in Addis Ababa, Ethiopia, in January 2007 as part of an effort to reach out to the Group of 77. He repeatedly identified Darfur as the top humanitarian priority of his administration. Ban played a large role, with several face-to-face meetings with Sudanese President Omar Hassan al-Bashir, in convincing Sudan to allow UN peacekeepers to enter the Darfur region. On 31 July 2007, the United Nations Security Council approved sending 26,000 UN peacekeepers into the region to join 7,000 troops from the African Union. The resolution was heralded as a major breakthrough in confronting the Darfur conflict (although the United States labelled the conflict a "genocide", the United Nations has declined to do so). The first phase of the peacekeeping mission began in October 2007.

====== Myanmar ======
Ban Ki-moon flew to Myanmar on 25 May 2008 to guide a conference with international agencies aimed at boosting donations for the nation, which was struck by Cyclone Nargis on 2 May 2008. The conference was initiated after Ban had met with Than Shwe, the leading figure of Myanmar's government 23 May 2008. Ban toured the devastation—especially in the hard-hit Irrawaddy Delta—23 May 2008 and 24 May 2008. Myanmar officials agreed to allow the Yangon International Airport to be used as a logistical hub for aid distribution.

==== Campaign for second term as secretary-general: 2011 ====
On 6 June 2011, Ban Ki-moon formally announced his candidacy for a second consecutive term as Secretary-General of the United Nations. He announced his candidacy at a press conference, following a meeting with the Asian group of countries at the United Nations. Ban Ki-moon's first mandate as the Secretary-General was set to end on 31 December 2011. The five permanent Security Council members supported his candidacy. There was no declared rival for the post.

==== Second term as secretary-general ====
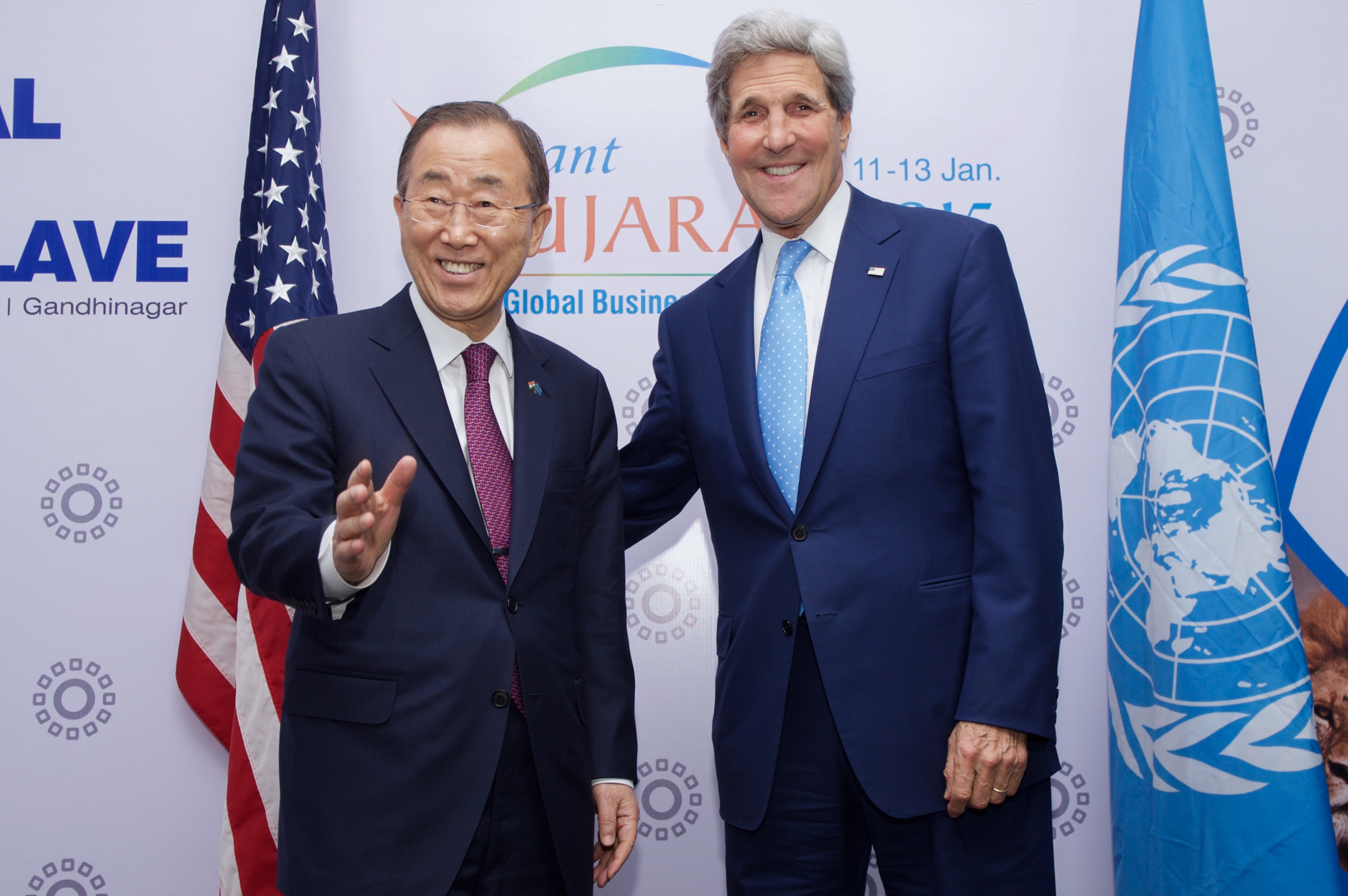
U.S. Secretary of State John Kerry and Ban Ki-moon, 11 January 2015

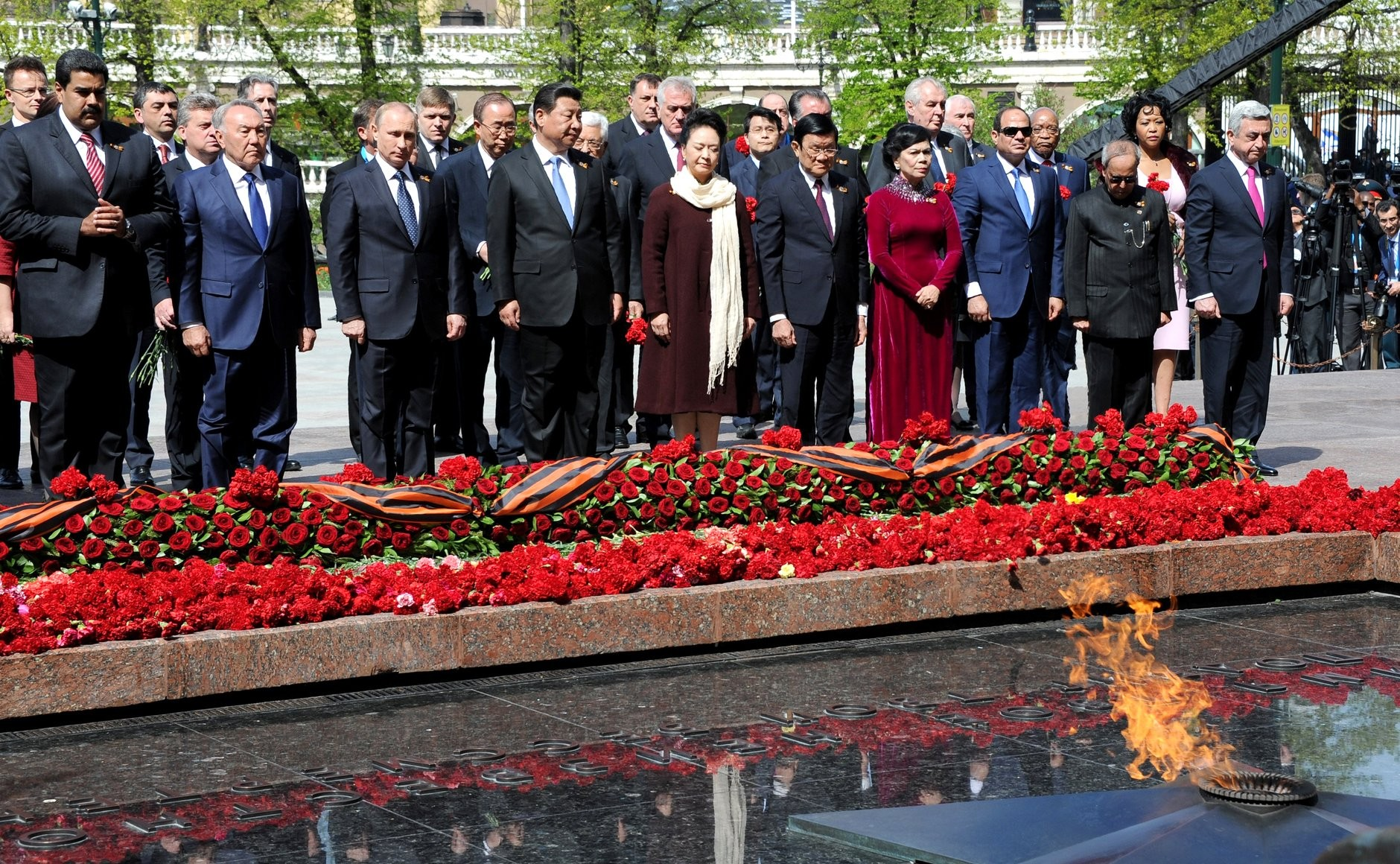
Ban with leaders of Russia, China, India, South Africa, Vietnam and Egypt during the Moscow Victory Day Parade, 9 May 2015

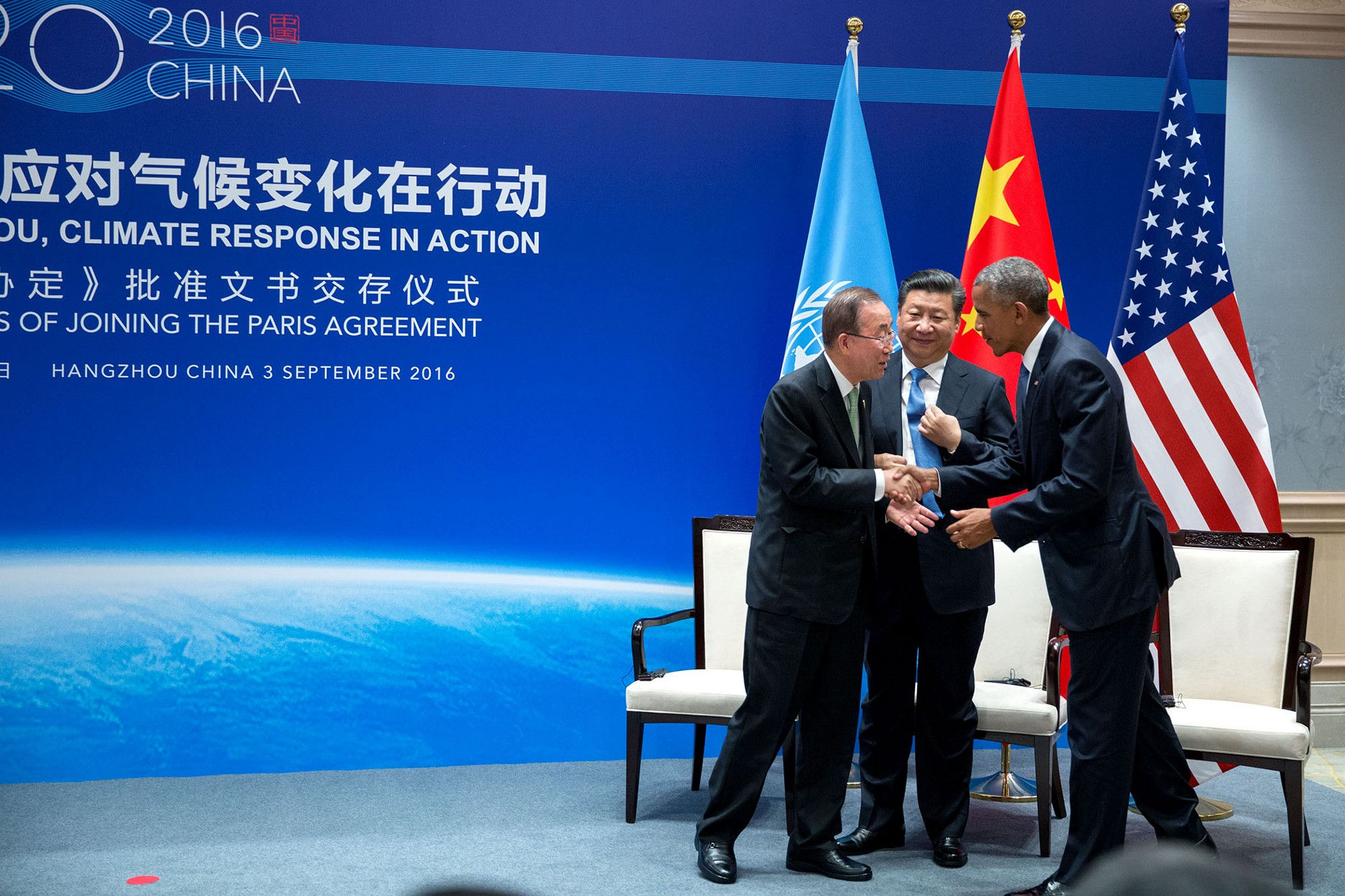
Ban Ki-moon, Chinese President Xi Jinping, and U.S. President Barack Obama in Hangzhou, China, 3 September 2016

On 17 June 2011, he received the recommendation of the Security Council by a unanimous vote, and, on 21 June, his nomination was confirmed by a unanimous acclamation vote at the United Nations General Assembly. His new five-year term as Secretary-General commenced on 1 January 2012 and ended on 31 December 2016.

===== Cabinet =====
Ban appointed Swedish diplomat Jan Eliasson as his new deputy secretary-general on 2 March 2012. His chief of staff is Edmond Mulet of Guatemala. The appointments were part of Ban's commitment to replace top positions in his group for his second term.

===== Key issues =====
After beginning his second term in January 2012, Ban focused his public statements and speeches on peace and equality in the Middle East and on equality issues.

====== Middle East ======
The aftermath of the Libyan Civil War and other events of the Arab Spring continued to command Ban's attention with the start of his second term. He focused in 2012 on what he termed "intolerance" in the Arab world. After travelling to Vienna to participate in the opening of the KAICIID Dialogue Centre to foster interreligious dialogue, Ban commented, "Many countries in the Arab world including Saudi Arabia are changing. Since the Arab Spring, the leaders have begun to listen to the voice of their people." He was however criticised in the Austrian press for associating himself with a project of Saudi King Abdullah, Saudi Arabia being a location of perceived religious intolerance.

Throughout 2012, Ban expressed his concern about the continuing Israeli–Palestinian conflict, in particular the condition of the Palestinian hunger strikers in Israeli prisons and the movement restrictions imposed on Gaza Strip residents. On 30 August 2012 Ban criticized the Iranian leadership due to their statements regarding Israel's destruction and denying the Holocaust. On 16 August 2013, Ban Ki-moon admitted that the UN was biased against Israel, stating in a meeting with Israeli students that there was a biased attitude towards the Israeli people and Israeli government at the UN. He described this as "an unfortunate situation." A few days later, he backtracked on the utterance. During an interview on 16 December 2016, Ban said that the UN has issued a "disproportionate volume of resolutions, reports and conferences criticizing Israel."

On 26 January 2016, Ban made a statement in relation to the attacks by Palestinians against Israelis. Ban Ki-moon said that "as oppressed peoples have demonstrated throughout the ages, it is human nature to react to occupation, which often serves as a potent incubator of hate and extremism". In rebuking Ban's statement, the Israeli PM Benjamin Netanyahu stated that "there is no justification for terror".

Ban has criticized Saudi Arabian-led intervention in Yemen, saying: "Grave violations against children increased dramatically as a result of the escalating conflict". In June 2016, Ban Ki-moon removed a Saudi-led coalition from a list of children's rights violators. He later admitted that Saudi Arabia threatened to cut Palestinian aid and funds to other UN programs if coalition was not removed from blacklist for killing children in Yemen. According to one source, there was also a threat of "clerics in Riyadh meeting to issue a fatwa against the UN, declaring it anti-Muslim, which would mean no contacts of OIC members, no relations, contributions, support, to any UN projects, programs".

====== Ukraine ======
On 26 June 2016, during a speech in Saint Petersburg, Russia, Ban said Russia "has a critical role to play" in addressing global issues "from ending the conflicts in Ukraine and Syria, to safeguarding human rights and controlling the proliferation of weapons of mass destruction". His comments were condemned by Ukraine's UN envoy Volodymyr Yelchenko, saying that he does not understand how the UN chief "can say such things which sort of praise the role of Russia in settling the conflict in Ukraine when the Russian Federation is the main player in aggressing Ukraine and in keeping this conflict boiling". He also noted that Russia is being accused of human rights abuses in Crimea and is "building up the nuclear potential" on the peninsula.

====== LGBT rights ======
On 7 March 2012, Ban delivered a speech titled "The Time Has Come" to the United Nations Human Rights Council urging the council to place greater emphasis on combating homophobia and promoting LGBT rights around the world. The speech was met by a protest by a group of delegates, who organized a walk-out protest during the speech.

During a speech at the UN headquarters commemorating Human Rights Day, Ban condemned countries with anti-gay laws, mentioning 76 countries that criminalize homosexuality. He said:

"It is an outrage that in our modern world, so many countries continue to criminalize people simply for loving another human being of the same sex."

Ban has told senior managers that homophobia will not be tolerated. He pointed to countries such as Ukraine which has proposed criminalizing public discussion about homosexuality as threatening basic human rights. He further stated that governments have a duty to defend vulnerable minorities. In April 2013, he described LGBT rights as one of the great neglected human rights of our time. He also said that religion, culture or tradition can never justify denial of basic rights.

====== Syrian conflict ======
Ban has been organizing and moderating the Geneva II Conference on Syria.

====== Humanitarian action ======
On 25 January 2012, Ban announced that he would convene the world's first summit on humanitarian aid in order to "share knowledge and establish common best practices." Known as the World Humanitarian Summit, the event took place in the 23–24 May 2016 in Istanbul, Turkey. In preparation for the summit, Ban released a report on 9 February 2016 titled 'One Humanity, Shared Responsibility' in which he laid out an "Agenda for Humanity" based on consultations with more than 23,000 people in 153 countries. The Agenda for Humanity outlines what is needed to reform humanitarian action, including political leadership to prevent and end conflict, new forms of financing, and a shift from providing aid to ending need. The summit is scheduled to include 5,000 participants, including representatives from governments, NGOs, civil society organisations, and the private sector, as well as individuals affected by humanitarian crises.

==== Criticism as UN secretary-general ====
According to The Washington Post, "some UN employees and delegates" expressed resentment at Ban's perceived favouritism in the appointment of South Korean nationals in key posts. Previous UN chiefs such as Kurt Waldheim (Austria), Javier Pérez de Cuéllar (Peru), and Boutros Boutros-Ghali (Egypt) brought small teams of trusted aides or clerical workers from their country's Foreign Ministry, and South Korean nationals have been historically underrepresented at the United Nations. Nonetheless, according to "some officials" in the Post story, Ban had allegedly gone further, boosting South Korea's presence in UN ranks by more than 20% during his first year in office. In response, Ban and his aides stated that the allegations of favouritism are wrong and that some of the harshest criticisms against him have undercurrents of racism. He said that the South Korean nationals he had appointed—including Choi Young-jin, who had already served as a high-ranking official in the United Nations' peacekeeping department—are highly qualified for their positions. Others such as Donald P. Gregg, a former U.S. ambassador to South Korea, said that the complaints were driven by envy: "I think being from South Korea, and people have growing respect for South Korea, that's a great enhancement for the secretary general. If he brings along talented people who he knows very well, I think that's also a plus." UN records show that South Korea, the organisation's eleventh-largest financial contributor, had only 54 South Korean nationals assigned to its mission six months before Ban took over the top UN post. By contrast, the Philippines, a significantly poorer country, had 759 nationals in its mission.

Former UN Under Secretary General for Oversight Services Inga-Britt Ahlenius denounced Ban Ki-moon after resigning her post in 2010, calling him "reprehensible". Ahlenius claimed that the Secretary-General made efforts to undermine the Office of Internal Oversight Services (OIOS) mandate and challenge its operational independence. In particular, the two disputed Ahlenius's plans to hire a former prosecutor, Robert Appleton, who had carried out investigations into corruption in UN peacekeeping missions from 2006 to 2009. Ban's staff explained that Appleton's appointment was rejected because Ahlenius had not properly considered female candidates for the appointment, and said that the final selection should have been made by Ban, not Ahlenius. Ahlenius claimed in her End of Assignment memo that "for the Secretary-General to control appointments in OIOS is an infringement of the operational independence of OIOS". Ban's chief of staff Vijay Nambiar described Ahlenius's complaints as "a deeply unbalanced account", and also stated that "many pertinent facts were overlooked or misrepresented" in Ahlenius's memo. Nambiar further noted that Ban "fully recognises the operational independence of OIOS, [but that] does not excuse [Ahlenius] from applying the standard rules of recruitment".

American diplomat James Wasserstrom claimed that Ban attempted to limit the jurisdiction of the UN dispute tribunal following Wasserstrom's dismissal from his Kosovo post and lengthy appeals process. Ban had refused to hand over confidential documents relating to the case to the UN personnel tribunal, despite repeated orders by the court to do so. In relation to another case, Ban was admonished by Judge Michael Adams for "willful disobedience" for again refusing to hand over key documents in an internal promotions dispute.

In 2013, Ban was accused of undermining the collective bargaining rights of The Staff Coordinating Council, the union representing United Nations staff. Ban unilaterally eliminated the role of the union to negotiate on behalf of the employees and terminated talks when the union protested.

Ban was named in a lawsuit challenging UN legal immunity on behalf of Haitians with cholera in the U.S. District Court of Manhattan. UN peacekeepers from Nepal are said to be the source of the 2010–13 Haiti cholera outbreak. Ban declared that the legal immunity of the United Nations before national courts should be upheld, but that this does not reduce the UN's moral responsibility to overcome Haiti's cholera epidemic. In January 2015, Judge J. Paul Oetken dismissed the lawsuit, affirming UN immunity. An appeal to Oetken's decision was submitted to the Court in May 2015.

British magazine The Economist, in May 2016, called Ban "plodding, protocol-conscious and loth to stand up to the big powers" and "the dullest—and among the worst" secretaries-general. Japanese diplomat Kiyotaka Akasaka defended Ban's understated presence as more quietly Confucian, stating that "[Ban's] behaviour has been like that of the wise man, the sage in Oriental philosophy". One UN official claimed that while Ban would greet world leaders in their native language, he would then read directly from his talking points without small talk. The UN official opined, "Quiet diplomacy? He [Ban] displayed no skills for that." South African lawyer Nicholas Haysom also defended Ban, saying that the news media "caricatured [Ban] as invisible when he made outspoken comments that the media then failed to report".

=== 2017 presidential candidacy speculation ===
Until the outbreak of the 2016 South Korean political scandal, Ban was the leading potential candidate for President of South Korea in 2017. However, recent polls showed Moon Jae-in of the main opposition Minjoo Party of Korea in the lead with a support rating of 32.8%, while Ban trailed in distant second with 15.4%. Moon was eventually elected president on 10 May. Although Ban repeatedly expressed his desires for running, a UN resolution in 1946 says "a Secretary-General should refrain from accepting" any Governmental position "at any rate immediately on retirement." Exceptions to the rule have been made in history with the 1986 election of Kurt Waldheim to the post of President of Austria, although the position is ceremonial in nature.

Contrary to Ban's public comments hinting at any likely run, private reports indicated otherwise. Kim Jong-pil, former Prime Minister of South Korea, was reported to say that Ban Ki-moon would announce his candidacy for the presidency shortly after his term as Secretary-General ended. Ban was originally predicted to run under the conservative Saenuri Party, but President Park Geun-hye's scandal cast doubts as to which party Ban would run under.

Ban returned to South Korea on 13 January 2017. On 1 February 2017, he announced he would not be a candidate for president.

=== Post-U.N. work ===
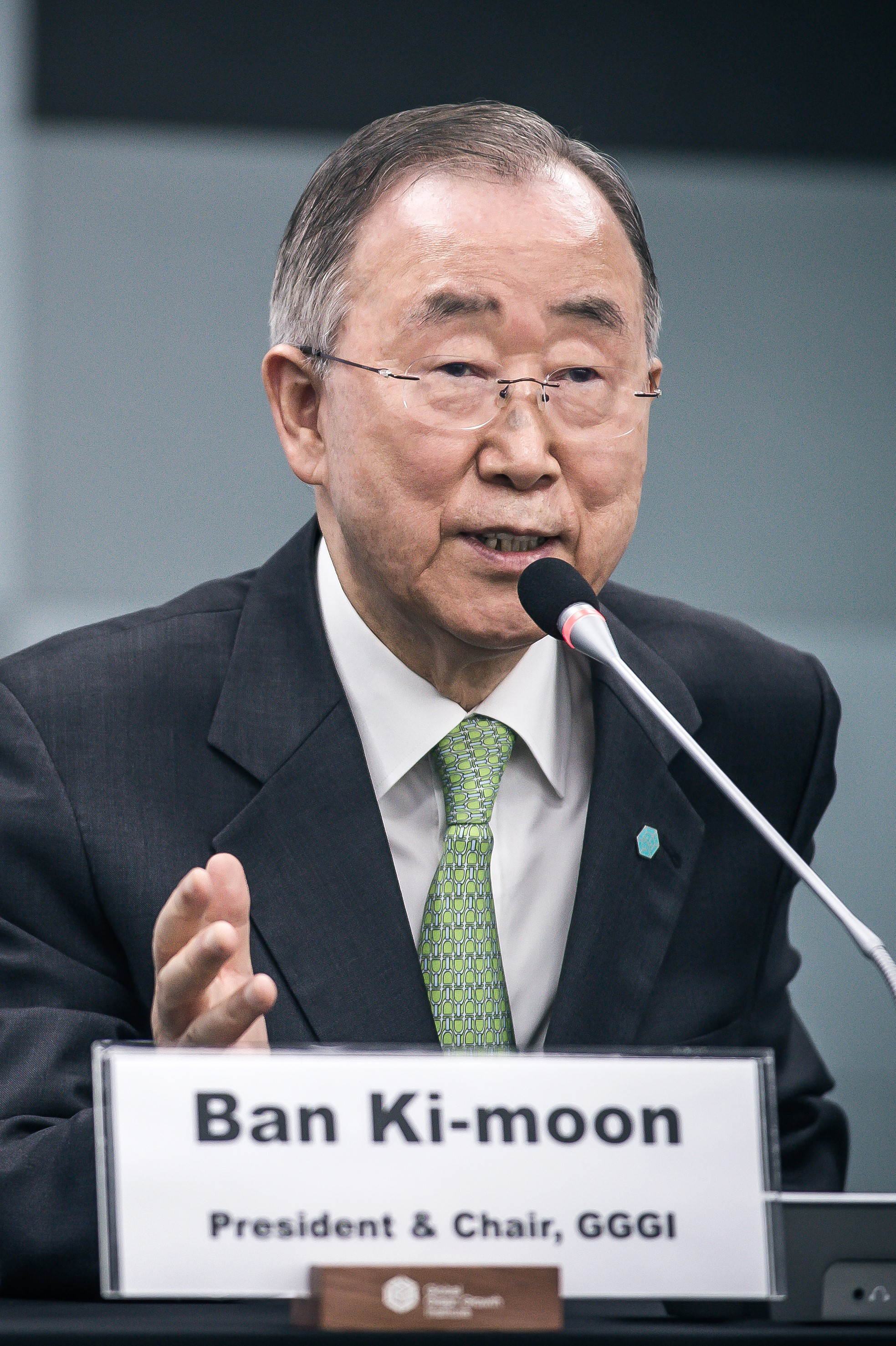

In 2017, Ban and Heinz Fischer, former president of Austria, founded, and are co-chairs of, the Ban Ki-moon Centre for Global Citizens in Vienna. The nonprofit group's mission is to support youth and women, working within the UN's Sustainable Development Goal frameworks.

In June 2017, Ban joined The Elders, a human rights group composed of international statesmen that was founded by Nelson Mandela. In November 2018, he became a deputy chair of the group, serving jointly with Graça Machel.

In 2017, he joined French president Emmanuel Macron in calling for a Global Pact for the Environment.

In early 2018, Ban was elected to lead the Global Green Growth Institute (GGGI), a treaty-based intergovernmental organisation. He has been unanimously re-elected to serve additional 2-year terms in the dual roles of the president of the Assembly and chair of the council, and his 4th term as president and chair of GGGI will end on 31 December 2025.

Ban supports the U.S. Democrats' Green New Deal.

In 2020, Ban Ki-Moon was appointed as the Official Ambassador of the GEMS World Academy Model United Nations.

== Personal life ==
=== Family ===
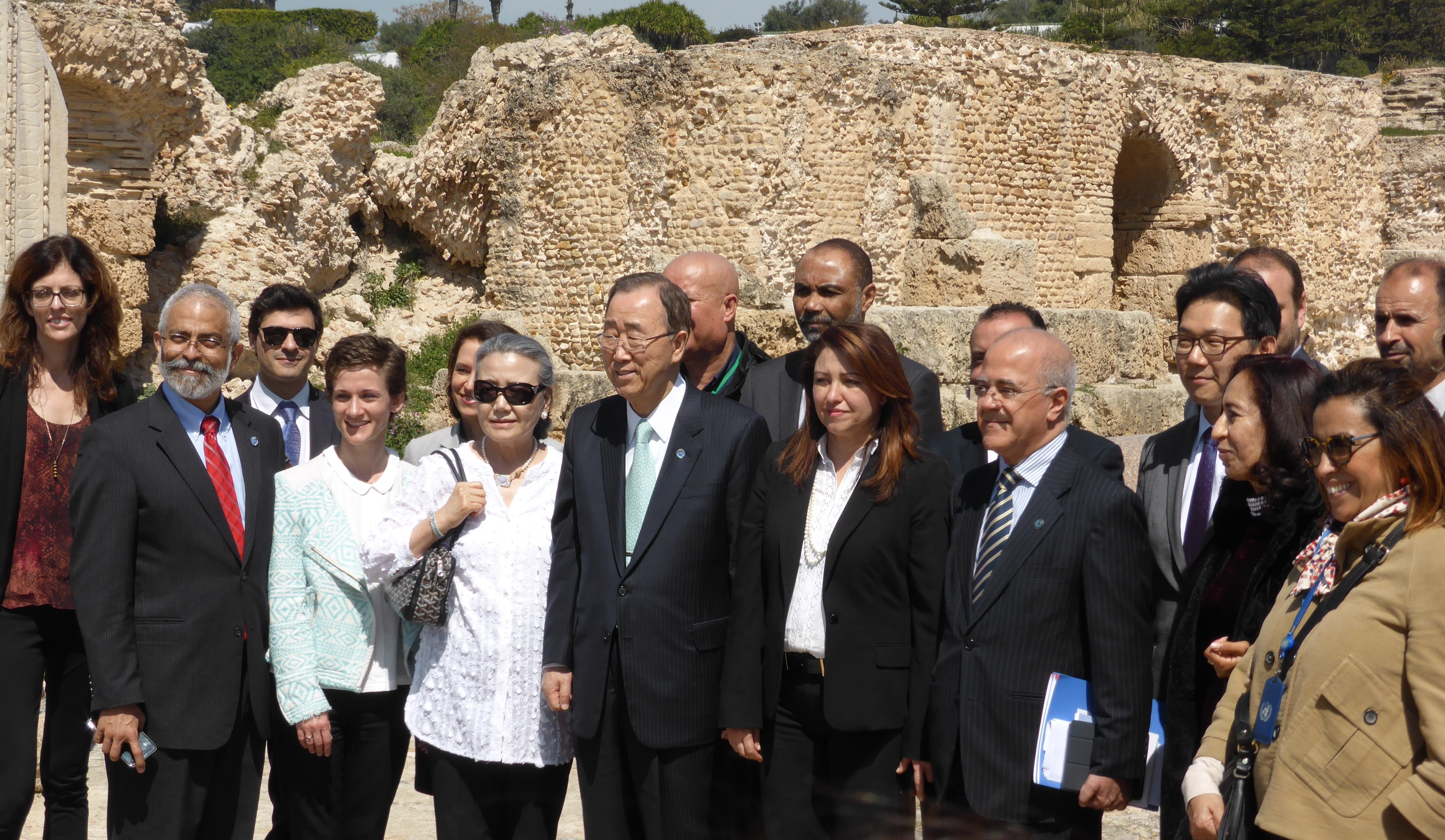
Ban Ki-moon and his wife visit the ancient ruins of Carthage in Tunisia, 29 March 2016

Ban Ki-moon met Yoo Soon-taek in 1962 when they were both in high school. Ban was 18 years old, and Yoo was his secondary school's student council president. They were married in 1971.

They have three adult children: two daughters and a son. His elder daughter, Seon-yong, was born in 1972 and now works for the Korea Foundation in Seoul. Her spouse is a native of India. His son Woo-hyun was born in 1974 in India. He received an MBA from Anderson School of Management at University of California, Los Angeles, and works for an investment firm in New York. His younger daughter, Hyun-hee (born 1976), is a field officer for UNICEF in Nairobi.

After he was elected secretary-general, Ban became an icon in his hometown, where his extended family still resides. Over 50,000 gathered in a soccer stadium in Chungju to celebrate the result. In the months following his election, thousands of practitioners of geomancy went to his village to determine how it produced such an important person. Ban himself is not a member of any church or religious group and has declined to expound his beliefs: "Now, as Secretary-General, it will not be appropriate at this time to talk about my own belief in any particular religion or god. So maybe we will have some other time to talk about personal matters." His mother is Buddhist.

In January 2017, Ban's brother Ban Ki-sang and nephew Bahn Joo-hyun were indicted on charges that they had engaged in a scheme to bribe a Middle Eastern official in connection with the attempted US$800 million sale of a building complex in Vietnam. In September 2018, Bahn Joo-hyun was sentenced to six months in prison in Manhattan federal court.

=== Personality and public image ===
During his tenure at the South Korean Foreign Ministry, Ban's nickname was jusa (주사), meaning "the administrative clerk". The name was used as both positive and negative: complimenting Ban's attention to detail and administrative skill while deriding what was seen as a lack of charisma and subservience to his superiors. The South Korean press corps calls him "the slippery eel" (기름장어), for his ability to dodge questions. His peers praise his understated "Confucian approach", and he is regarded by many as a "stand-up guy" and is known for his "easy smile". After he assumed the post of UN Secretary-General, he was caricatured as "invisible man", "powerless observer", or "nowhere man" for his lack of powerful personality and leadership.

== Honours and awards ==
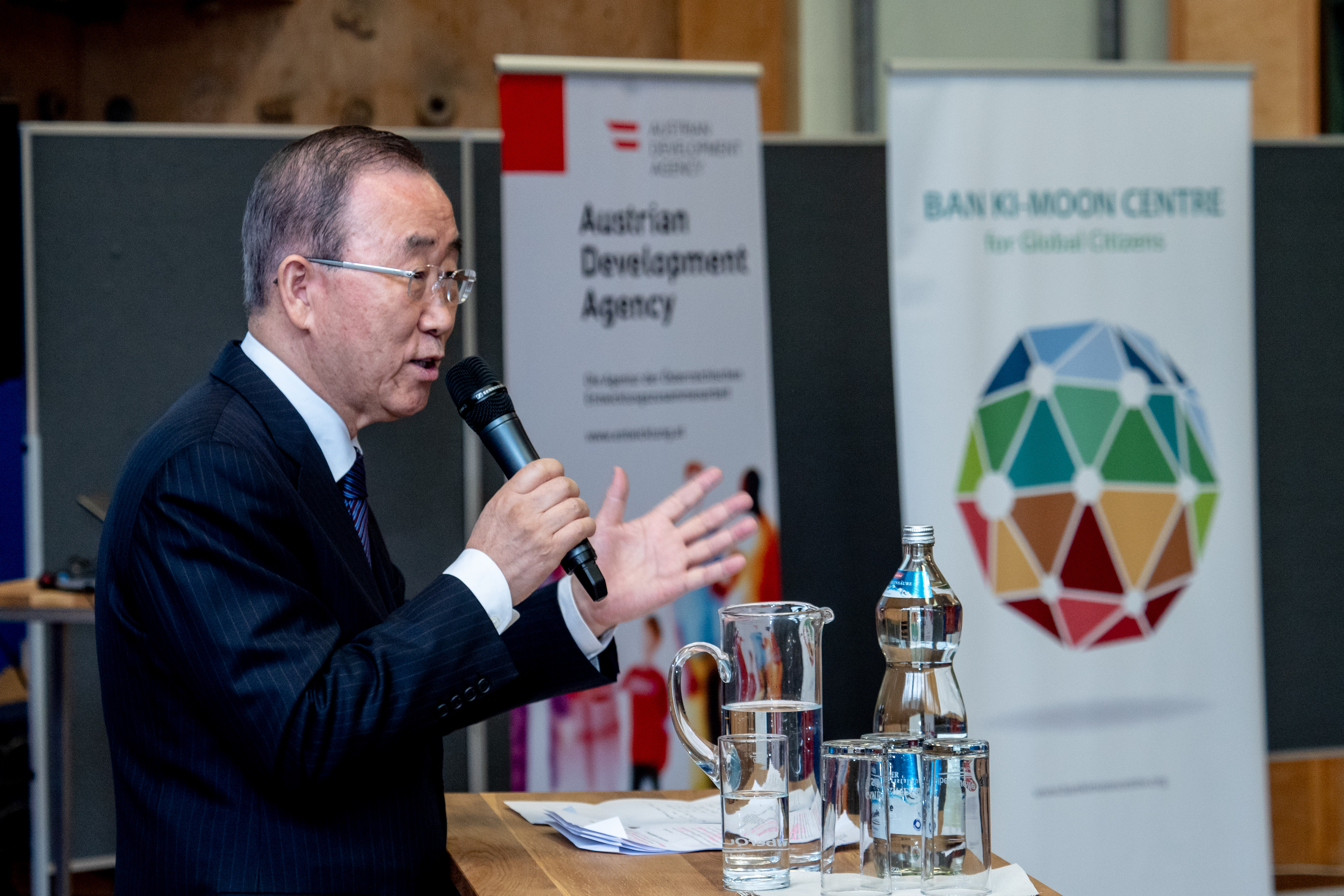
Ban Ki-moon speaking at an event in 2018

=== National ===
- South Korea: Blue Stripes or 1st Class of the Order of Service Merit (1975), (1986), (2006)

=== Foreign ===
- Algeria: National Order of Merit of Algeria
- Argentina: Grand Cross of the Order of the Liberator General San Martín (2016)
- Austria: Grand Decoration of Honour in Gold with Star of the Decoration of Honour for Services to the Republic of Austria (2001)
- Brazil: Grand Cross of the Order of Rio Branco
- Burkina Faso: Grand Cross of the National Order of Burkina Faso (2008)
- El Salvador: Grand Cross with Silver Star of the Order of Jose Matias Delgado
- Ivory Coast: Grand Officer of the National Order of Ivory Coast (2008)
- Kazakhstan: Order of Friendship, 1st class (2010)
- Kenya: Chief of the Order of the Golden Heart (Kenya) (2025)
- Monaco: Grand Cross of the Order of Saint-Charles (2013)
- Netherlands: Grand Cross of the Order of the Netherlands Lion (19 April 2016)
- Peru: Grand Cross of the Order of the Sun (2006)
- Philippines: Grand Cross of the Order of Sikatuna, Rank of Raja (30 October 2008)
- Portugal: Grand Cross of the Order of Liberty (13 May 2016)
- Russia: Order of Friendship (8 June 2016)
- San Marino: Order of Saint Agatha (2013)
- Spain: Collar of the Order of Civil Merit (2 December 2016)
- Tajikistan: Order of Ismoili Samoni (2010)
- Uruguay: Medal of the Oriental Republic of Uruguay (2011)

=== Foreign Awards ===
- Turkmenistan: Jubilee medal "25th anniversary of the neutrality of Turkmenistan" (2020)
- Austria: Grand Golden Order of the City of Vienna (2013)
- Samoa: High Matai title conferred by Samoa as Prince Tapua Ban Ki-Moon of Suipapa Saleapaga. September 2014 during UN SIDS Conference.
- Ban Ki-moon, in his capacity as Secretary-General of the United Nations, was one of the Olympic Torch carriers of the 2016 Summer Olympics.
- Ban Ki-moon, in his capacity as Secretary-General of the United Nations, was one of the Olympic Torch carriers and he was also one of the Olympic Flag carriers of the 2012 Summer Olympics opening ceremony.
- He was awarded the Arctic Circle Prize in 2016 in recognition of his advocacy for climate diplomacy during his tenure as UN Secretary-General, specifically for his role in negotiating the Paris Agreement.
- He was honoured with James A. Van Fleet Award by the Korea Society in New York City for his contributions to friendship between the United States and South Korea.
- He accepted the 2014 Tipperary International Peace Award, described as "Ireland's outstanding award for humanitarian work", in County Tipperary, Ireland in May 2015.
- Commemorative Medal of Freedom Heroes of the Republic of Hungary

=== Honorary degrees ===
- Honorary Doctor of Public Service degree from University of Maryland, College Park on 17 October 2016
- Honorary Doctor of Humane Letters degree from Loyola Marymount University on 6 April 2016
- Honorary Doctor of Laws degree of The University of Auckland on 3 September 2014
- Honorary Doctorate in Human Letters from Fairleigh Dickinson University on 10 September 2008
- Honorary doctorate from Seoul National University (2008)
- Doctor Honoris Causa from the National University of San Marcos, the main university in Peru and the oldest of the Americas (2011)
- Doctor of Laws Degree Honoris Causa from the College of Law at the University of the Philippines Diliman, the national university of the country, in 2008
- Honorary Doctor by the National University of Mongolia in 2009
- "Doctors of Letters" by Jamia Millia Islamia in New Delhi
- Honorary doctorates in law from the University of Malta (2009) and the University of Washington (2009)
- Honorary doctorate of public service from University of Denver (2013)
- Honorary doctorate from Georgetown University (2015)
- Honorary doctorate from Katholieke Universiteit Leuven (2015)
- Doctor honoris causa from Comenius University (2015)
- Degree of Doctor of Civil Law Honoris Causa from University of Mauritius (2016)
- Honorary Doctor of Laws from Columbia University (2016)
- Honorary Degree from Marymount Manhattan College (2016)
- Doctor honoris causa from Panthéon-Sorbonne University (2016)
- Doctor of Law (honoris causa) from the University of Cambridge (3 February 2016)
- Honorary doctorate from the University of Groningen (2018)
- Honorary doctorate in Global Peace and Sustainable Development from Universiti Kebangsaan Malaysia (2019)
- Honorary doctorate in recognition of work in pursuing peace, promoting human rights, and advancing UN Sustainable Development from Tampere University (2022)

== Books ==
- Resolved: Uniting Nations in a Divided World. India: HarperCollins. 2021. p. 376. ISBN 9789354893087.

== See also ==
- List of trips by Ban Ki-moon

== Notes ==
Political offices
Preceded by Yoon Young-kwan	Minister of Foreign Affairs and Trade; 2004–2006	Succeeded by Song Min-soon
Positions in intergovernmental organisations
Preceded by Kofi Annan	Secretary-General of the United Nations; 2007–2016	Succeeded by António Guterres
