= Ban Ki-moon Centre for Global Citizens =

International NGO

- Abbreviation: BKMC
- Founded: January 2018; 8 years ago
- Type: International Organization
- Headquarters: Vienna, Austria
- CEO: Monika Froehler
- Website: www.bankimooncentre.org.

The Ban Ki-moon Centre for Global Citizens (BKMC) is a Quasi-International Organization located in Vienna, Austria, with the mission to foster leadership for the implementation of the Sustainable Development Goals (SDGs) and the Paris Climate Agreement by inspiring current leaders as decision makers and empowering the next generation of leaders as change makers.

The BKMC's stated aims are to advocate for governmental policymaking on global issues such as sustainable development, climate action, gender justice, and transformative education, while offering opportunities to young change makers to amplify their voices and equip them with knowledge about the SDGs, 21st century skills and global citizenship values. The BKMC further aims to empower women, youth and leaders across borders to create change.

== Co-Founders and Co-Chairs ==
Established in January 2018, the BKMC was co-founded and is co-chaired by Ban Ki-moon, the 8th Secretary-General of the United Nations, and Heinz Fischer, the 11th President of the Republic of Austria. Ban Ki-moon is a former South Korean politician and diplomat who served as Secretary-General of the United Nations from 2007 to 2016. Prior to this appointment, Ban was Minister of Foreign Affairs and Trade of South Korea between 2004 and 2006. Heinz Fischer is a former Austrian politician. He took office as President of Austria on 8 July 2004 and was re-elected for a second and last term on 25 April 2010, leaving office on 8 July 2016. Fischer previously served as Minister of Science and Research from 1983 to 1987 and as president of the National Council of Austria from 1990 to 2002.
