= Yoon Young-kwan =

South Korean politician (born 1951)

- 윤영관
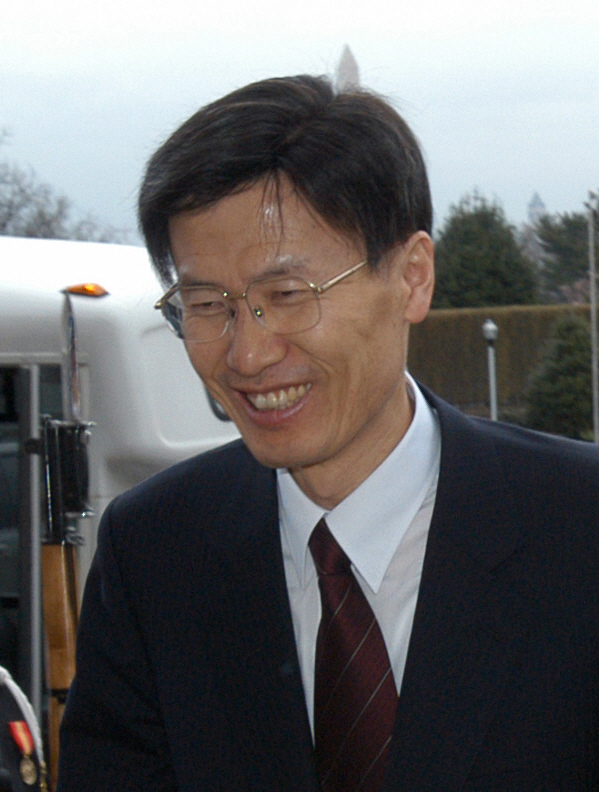
- Yoon in 2003

Minister of Foreign Affairs and Trade
- In office 27 February 2003 – 15 January 2004
- President: Roh Moo-hyun
- Preceded by: Choi Sung-hong
- Succeeded by: Ban Ki-moon

- Yoon Young-kwan
- Hangul: 윤영관
- Hanja: 尹永寬
- RR: Yun Yeonggwan
- MR: Yun Yŏnggwan

Yoon Young-kwan (born January 12, 1951) is a South Korean academic and politician, who was the Foreign Minister of South Korea in 2003.

Yoon is a professor emeritus at Seoul National University's Department of Political Science and International Relations and taught courses on International Political Economy, Introduction to International Relations, and South-North Korean relations. He began teaching at the department in 1990. Before he joined the faculty of Seoul National University, he taught at the University of California, Davis for 3 years.

He was appointed the 32nd Foreign Minister of South Korea on February 27, 2003. He resigned from this post on January 15, 2004. He served as Korea's eminent representative to and the co-chair of the East Asia Vision Group II for the ASEAN+3 Summit Meeting from September 2011 to October 2012.

Yoon has published several books and about 70 articles in the field of international political economy, Korea's foreign policy, and inter-Korean relations. He was the recipient of the Korean Government Scholarship (1981–85), the Best Book Award (by the Korean Association of International Studies) (1996), and the Best Teachers' Award (Seoul National University) (2015).

== Education ==
Yoon received his B.A. and M.A. in International Relations from Seoul National University in 1975 and 1977, respectively.

After completing his military service as a lecturer in International Law at the Republic of Korea Naval Academy, he went on to receive a master's degree (1983) and a Ph.D. at Johns Hopkins University's School of Advanced International Studies (SAIS) in 1987 ("Political Economy of Foreign Investment and Productivity: A Historical Observation and Industry-Specific Case Studies").

Political offices
Preceded by Choi Sung-hong	Minister of Foreign Affairs and Trade of South Korea; 2003–2004	Succeeded by Ban Ki-moon
