= Jeju Peace Forum =

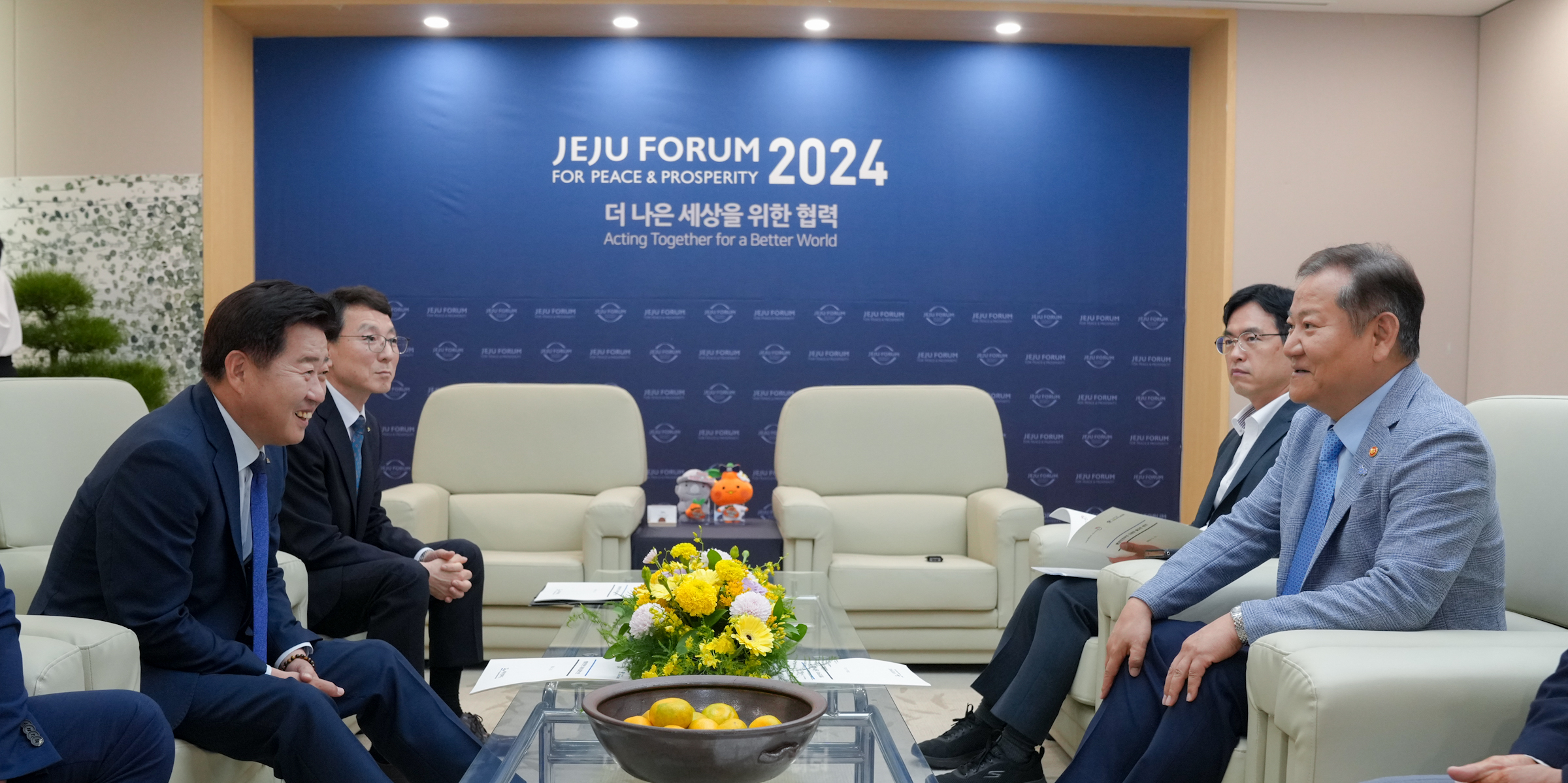
Lee Sang-min and Oh Young-hoon (Jeju Forum)

The Jeju Forum for Peace and Prosperity, formerly known as the Jeju Peace Forum, started in 2001. The Forum is an international comprehensive forum in East Asia in which the official aims are to build common peace and prosperity and addressing stability and security issues within the region through international cooperation. The Jeju Peace Forum started as a biennial meeting but it was reorganized as an annual event in May 2011. Its permanent secretariat is located in the Jeju Peace Institute.

== Mission ==
The Jeju Forum is a regional multilateral dialogue for promoting peace and prosperity in Asia. The Forum serves as a platform for discussing and sharing future visions on sustainable peace and prosperity in Asia. Hosted by the Government of Jeju Special Self-governing Province with the full support of the Ministry of Foreign Affairs of South Korea, the Forum was launched in 2001 as Jeju Peace Forum. The Forum had been held biennially before 2009 and when it became an annual event in 2011, the Forum was renamed as the Jeju Forum for Peace and Prosperity. Its Secretariat is headquartered in Jeju, South Korea. The Jeju Forum is held in Jeju each year with more than 60 sessions, including plenary sessions and various networking opportunities, thereby providing a great deal of insights to the world. As its title suggests, the Jeju Forum for Peace and Prosperity has always been driven by a central mission to build peace in East Asia by facilitating a multilateral dialogue on peace, diplomacy and security among related stakeholders. Though its core vision remains unchanged, the forum has been expanding its scope and boundaries to devote attention to not just international relations, but also a wide range of subjects from other fields.

== History ==
=== 1st Forum ===
TITLE: Building Common Peace & Prosperity in Northeast Asia

DATE: June 15 to June 17, 2001

The first forum coincided with the first anniversary of the South-North Summit on June 15 to address the region's prospects for peace, stability, and prosperity in the twenty-first century. President Kim Dae-jung of the Republic of Korea emphasized that coexistence and peaceful reunification can only be achieved through South-North reconciliation, exchange, and cooperation based on mutual understanding and tolerance.

=== 2nd Forum ===
TITLE: Building a Northeast Asian Community: Challenges and New Visions

DATE: October 30 to November 1, 2003

The establishment of a multilateral security institution through the Six-Party Talks was the main topic of the second forum, together with the exchange of various views and practical measures addressing the topic of regional security cooperation. Other discussion points included the North Korean nuclear threat, inter-Korean relations, and the role of South Korea in promoting peace and prosperity in the region.

=== 3rd Forum ===
TITLE: Building a Northeast Asian Community: Towards Peace and Prosperity

DATE: June 9 to June 11, 2005

The third forum discussed necessary measures for establishing a regional security institution for peace and prosperity and the expected challenges. Participants exchanged their views to facilitate regional cooperation in the trade, energy, and ¬financial sectors.

=== 4th Forum ===
TITLE: Peace & Prosperity in Northeast Asia: Exploring the European Experience

DATE: June 21 to June 23, 2007

The fourth forum examined political, security, and economic experiences of Europe that were applicable to the context of Northeast Asia, such as the reunifi¬cation of Germany and European integration. An institutional framework for peace and prosperity on the Korean Peninsula and Northeast Asia was also discussed.

=== 5th Forum ===
TITLE: Shaping New Regional Governance in East Asia: A common Vision for Mutual Benefit and Common Prosperity

DATE: August 11 to August 13, 2009

Based on the cumulative content from previous forums, wider issues such as historical disputes, economic crises, and regional cooperation were covered at the fifth forum. Nontraditional security issues, such as economic security and human security, were also discussed, together with the traditional security agendas such as North Korean nuclear weapons.

=== 6th Forum ===
TITLE: New Asia for Peace and Prosperity

DATE: May 27 to May 29, 2011

The sixth forum focused on key Northeast Asian regional issues including China’s rising power and its implications for Asian economies and financial markets. Regional security agendas, such as nuclear and maritime security, as well as issues concerning the Korean Peninsula and reunification, were also discussed.

=== 7th Forum ===
TITLE: New Trends and the Future of Asia

DATE: May 31 to June 2, 2012

The main topic of the seventh forum was the future and the role of Asia amid the rapid changes in society. The forum also covered other topics such as measures to facilitate and widen regional cooperation, economic cooperation and free trade, cultural exchange, mutual understanding, and human interchange

=== 8th Forum ===
TITLE: New Waves in Asia

DATE: May 29 to May 31, 2013

The year 2013 was a transitional point for the international community as the United States, Japan, China, Russia, North Korea, and South Korea all underwent changes in their respective administrations. The adoption of major policy changes by the new governments was anticipated, and the new role and paradigm of the Asia-Pacific region, where tensions remained high owing to territorial disputes and North Korean nuclear weapons, were discussed during the eighth forum.

=== 9th Forum ===
TITLE: Designing New Asia

DATE: May 28 to May 30, 2014

The ninth forum dealt with international cooperation and security, business and economy, culture, gender, the environment, sustain-ability, and community development. The former and incumbent leaders of the Asia-Pacific region shared their perspectives on these issues. More than sixty sessions were held for participants to discuss solutions to unravel the paradoxes within the region in search of a "New Asia."

=== 10th Forum ===
TITLE: Towards a New Asia of Trust and Harmony

DATE: May 20 to May 22, 2015

The tenth forum focused on building a more solid mechanism for multilateral cooperation in Asia. The year 2015 marked the seventieth anniversary of key historical events including the end of World War II, the founding of the United Nations, and the liberation of Korea from Japanese colonial rule. One of the highlights of the forum was the review of progress made toward maintaining a peaceful coexistence within the region.

=== 11th Forum ===
TITLE: Asia’s New Order and Cooperative Leadership

DATE: May 25 to May 27, 2016

Asia’s political and economic situation is in transition, fraught with a mix of old and new problems. As we witness a daunting array of challenges, we are also seeing rays of hope in the cooperation among Korea, China, and Japan. The eleventh forum examined the implications for leadership against this backdrop, covering a range of topics from peaceful cooperation to climate change.

=== 12th Forum ===
TITLE: Sharing a Common Vision for Asia’s Future

DATE: May 31 to June 2, 2017

Today, humanity is facing supranational issues such as low growth, climate change, and cybersecurity amid a new political and economic order symbolized by the recent deglobalization trend. An agenda for a "cooperative Asia" was presented and discussed at the twelfth forum, aiming to provide ways for a better future with regard to the universal wishes of humanity.

=== 13th Forum ===
TITLE: Reengineering Peace for Asia

DATE: June 26 to June 28, 2018

Over the years, Asia has been facing an increasing array of security problems and nontraditional security challenges to maintaining peace and stability. The thirteenth forum aimed at redefining peace and seeking ways to build enduring peace in Asia to promote the denuclearization of the Korean Peninsula and the establishment of a permanent peace regime.

=== 14th Forum ===
TITLE: Asia Towards Resilient Peace: Cooperation and Integration

DATE: May 29 to May 31, 2019

Amidst growing uncertainties in the regional order, seeking resilient and sustainable peace in the whole of the Asia-Pacific has become vital. The fourteenth forum presented ways to find a balancing point for coexistence and turning insecure peace into a resilient peace. Strategies for making cities resilient and making the Asia-Pacific nuclear-free region were discussed.

=== 15th Forum ===
TITLE: Reinventing Multilateral Cooperation: Pandemic and Humane Security

DATE: November 5 to November 7, 2020

In 2020, humanity faced its greatest threat from the surge of unilateralism and COVID-19. The concept of security was revisited to ensure multilateralism and peace throughout the world. The fifteenth forum aimed to reinvent multilateral cooperation in the age of pandemics and establish the concept of "Humane Security."

=== 16th Forum ===
TITLE: Sustainable Peace, Inclusive Prosperity

DATE: June 24 to June 26, 2021

Even amid the COVID-19 pandemic, the Jeju Forum has managed to carry on the tradition of opening up to the public and participants across borders, leading the discourse on sustainable peace and prosperity. In particular, this year’s forum celebrated the thirtieth anniversary of the South Korea–Soviet Union summit on Jeju in 1991, which gave birth to the idea of designating Jeju as "The Island of World Peace" and revisited what the end of the Cold War implied for peace in Northeast Asia.
