= Koreatown =

Korean-dominated ethnic enclave

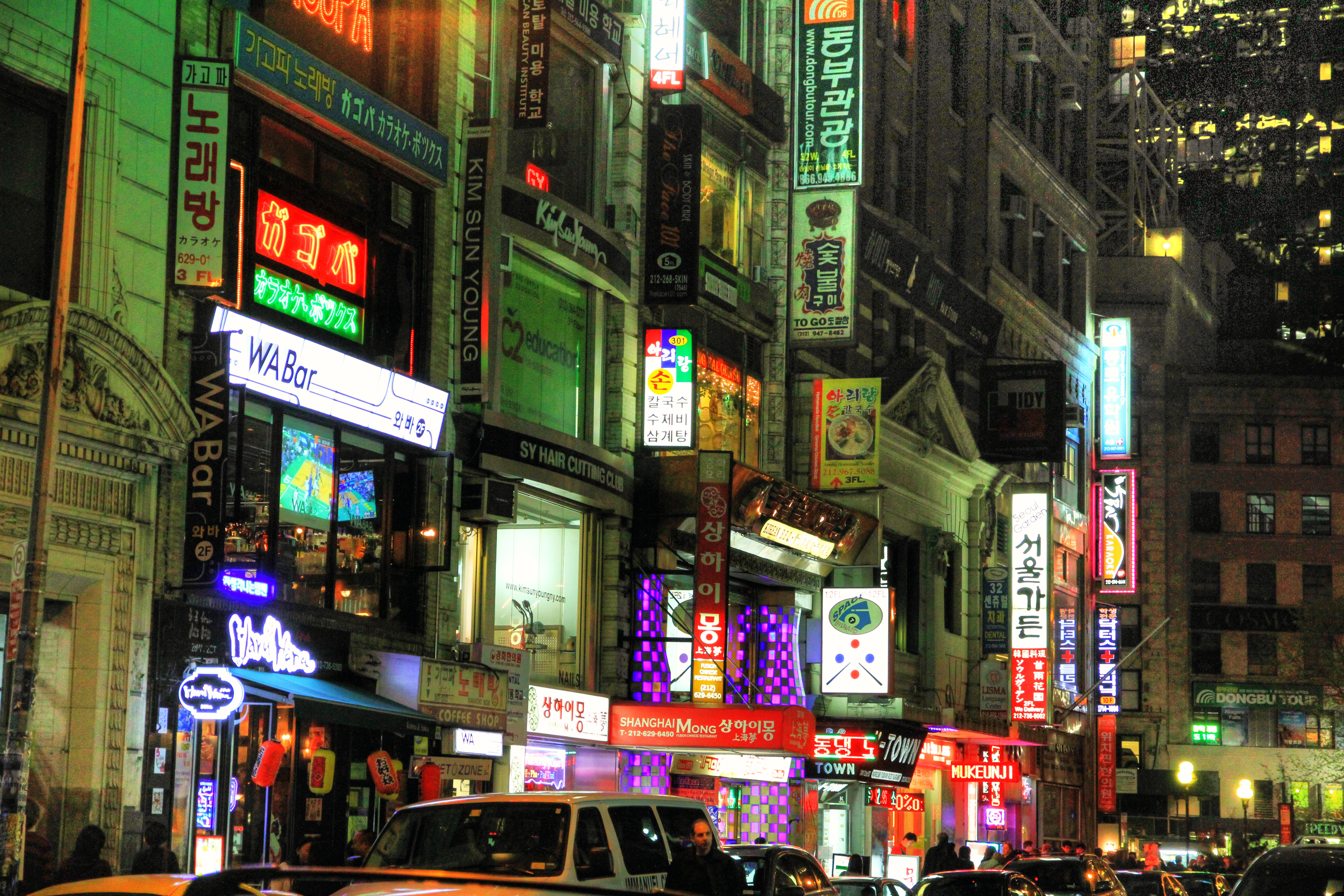
Koreatowns, like this one on 32nd Street in Midtown Manhattan, represent an overseas Korean diaspora and Korean culture.

A Koreatown (Korean: 코리아타운), also known as a Little Korea or Little Seoul, is a Korean-dominated ethnic enclave within a city or metropolitan area outside the Korean Peninsula.

== Etymology ==
The New York Times coined the term "Koreatown" in 1977 to refer to the Korean neighborbood of Los Angeles. The name "Koreatown" was modeled after the older, well-established term "Chinatown", which dates back to 1606. The Korean residents of Los Angeles successfully lobbied for Koreatown to be formally recognized by Los Angeles County in 1980, and the first Koreatown sign was installed in 1982. Prior to the popularization of the name "Koreatown," Korean Americans often referred to Korean ethnic enclaves as "Korean village," a translation of the Korean term "Haninchon" (Korean: 한인촌; Hanja: 韓人村; lit. 'Korean people's village'). In the early 21st century, other countries have adopted the name "Koreatown" to designate their own Korean ethnic enclaves, such as Canada recognizing Koreatown, Toronto in 2004.

== History ==
Koreatowns as an East Asian ethnic enclave have only been in existence since the mid-1860s, as Korea had been a territorially stable polity for centuries; according to Jaeeun Kim, "The congruence of territory, polity, and population was taken for granted." Large-scale emigration from Korea was only mainly into the Russian Far East and Northeast China; these emigrants became the ancestors of the two million Koreans in China and several hundred thousand ethnic Koreans in Central Asia.

Koreatowns in Western countries such as the United States and Canada have only been in place much later with the Los Angeles Koreatown receiving official recognition in 2008. Also many Koreatowns are not officially sanctioned where the only evidence of such enclaves exist as clusters of Korean stores with Korean signage existing only on the storefronts. In the 1992 Los Angeles riots, many Korean businesses were targeted where the signage only served to point out targets for rioters. In Philadelphia's Koreatown, anti-Korean sentiment was so strong that official signage was often vandalized as residents protested the "official recognition" of such areas, making many Koreatowns across the western countries never having official statuses that many Chinatowns receive today. Many Koreatowns today exist in a suburban setting as opposed to the urban settings of Chinatown mainly because many ethnic Koreans, especially in the western countries, fear crime that is often associated with the city dwellings and the higher quality of schools as education is often a top priority, which is why the Philadelphia Koreatowns exist in suburban settings such as Cheltenham, Pennsylvania instead of its original location in the Olney section of Philadelphia.

== Characteristics ==
The features described below are characteristic of many modern Koreatowns:

=== Korean signage ===
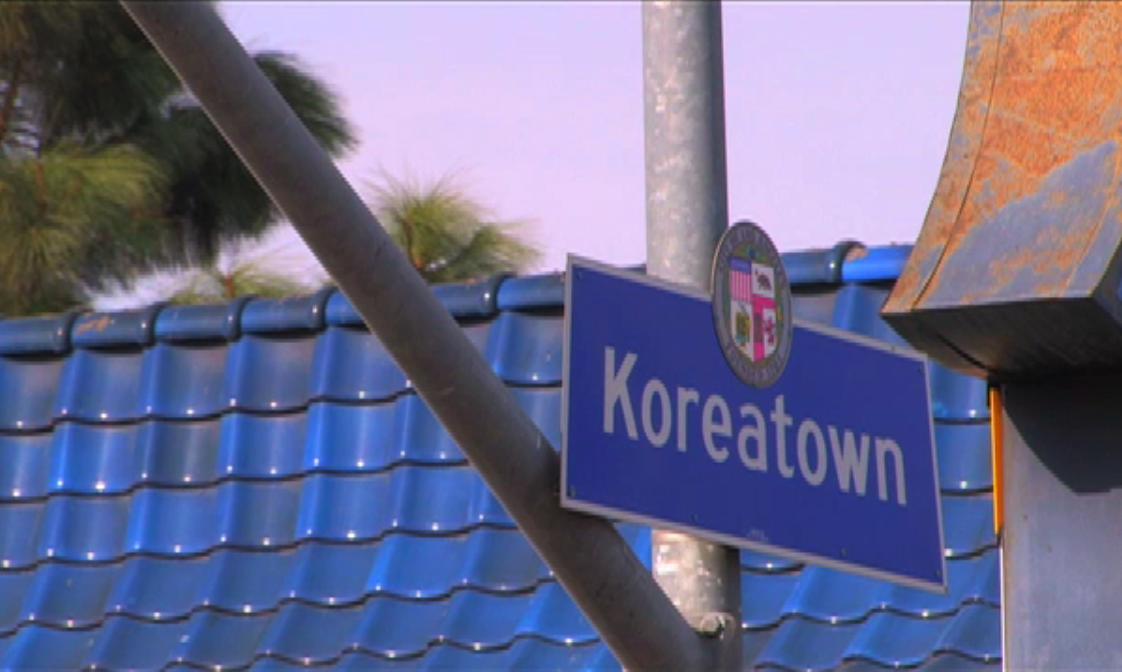
The Koreatown marker in Los Angeles

Many modern Koreatowns will exhibit the usage of the Korean language and Hangul on storefront signs sometimes on official highway signage. Officially sanctioned Koreatowns may also exhibit signs in the local language. In English, the word "Koreatown", "Little Korea" and "Korea Way" can sometimes be seen, as in the case with the Los Angeles Koreatown.

=== Korean restaurants ===
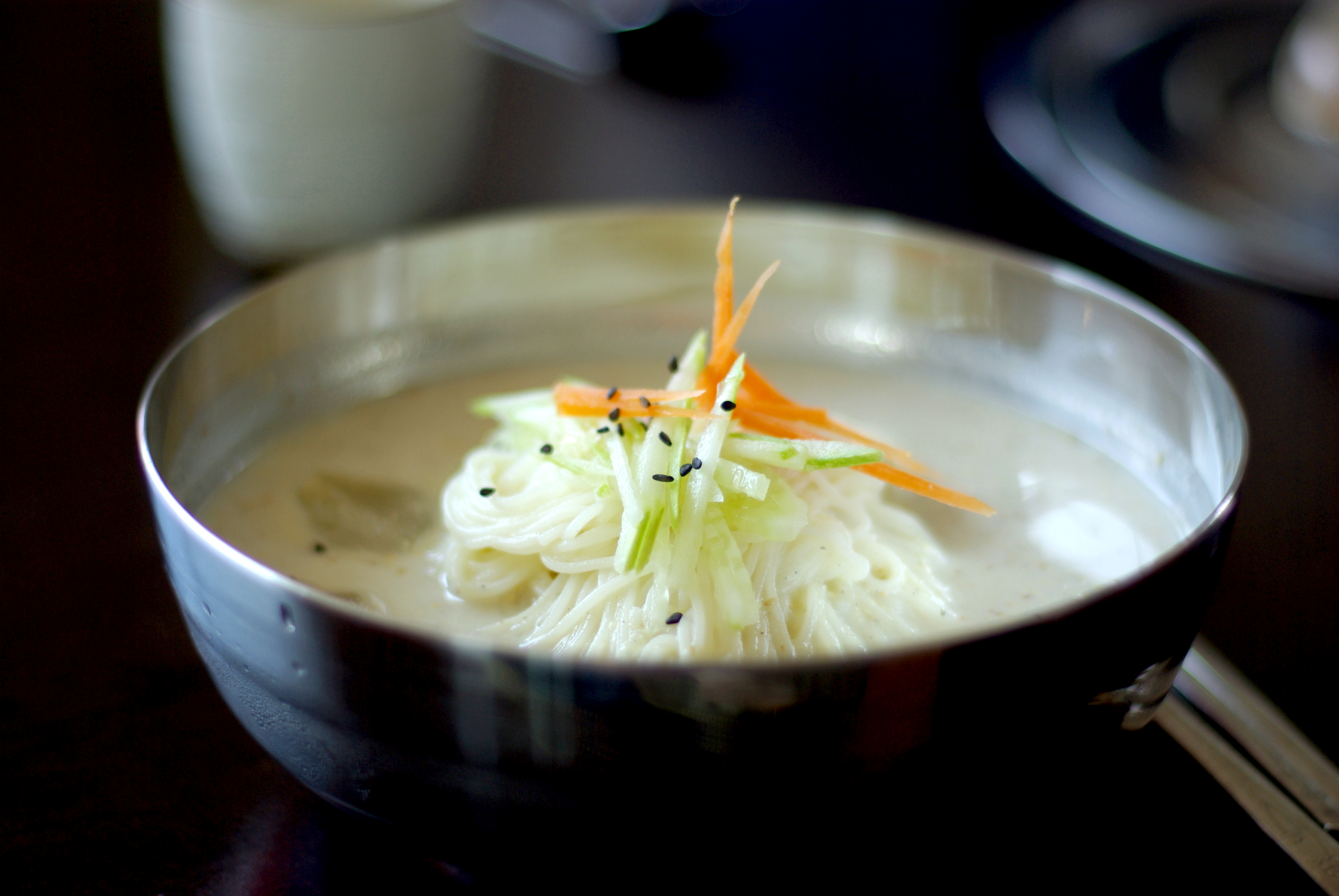
Kongguksu, a cold noodle dish with a broth made from ground soy beans

Many Koreatowns will have stores that serve Korean cuisine, usually serving as the major differentiator between other East Asian and Southeast Asian ethnic enclaves such as Chinatown and Little Saigons. The Korean national cuisine known today has evolved through centuries of social and political change. Originating from ancient agricultural and nomadic traditions in Southern Manchuria and the Korean Peninsula, Korean cuisine has evolved through a complex interaction of the natural environment and different cultural trends.

Korean cuisine is largely based upon rice, vegetables and meats. Traditional Korean meals are noted for the number of side dishes (banchan) that accompany steam-cooked short-grain rice. Kimchi is served often, sometimes at every meal. Commonly used ingredients include sesame oil, doenjang (fermented bean paste), soy sauce, salt, garlic, ginger, pepper flakes and gochujang (fermented red chili paste).

== Locations ==
=== Korean demographics ===
Many Koreatowns are actual ethnic enclaves where nearly four-fifths of migrant Koreans live in just three countries: China, the United States and Mexico. Other countries with greater than 0.5% Korean minorities include Australia, Canada, Kazakhstan, New Zealand, and Uzbekistan. All these figures include both permanent migrants and sojourners. If one focuses on long-term residents, there were about 5.3 million Korean emigrants as of 2010.

Overseas Koreans 교포·재외동포 / 僑胞·在外同胞 gyopo/jaeoedongpo
Total population
- 7,325,143 (2021)

Regions with significant populations
- United States: 2,546,982
- China: 2,461,386
- Japan: 824,977
- Canada: 241,750
- Uzbekistan: 177,270
- Vietnam: 172,684
- Russia: 169,933
- Australia: 167,331
- Kazakhstan: 109,923
- Philippines: 85,125
- Brazil: 48,281
- Germany: 44,864
- United Kingdom: 40,770
- New Zealand: 38,114
- France: 29,167
- Argentina: 23,063
- Indonesia: 22,774
- Singapore: 21,406
- Malaysia: 20,861
- Thailand: 20,200
- Kyrgyzstan: 18,515
- Ukraine: 13,070
- Sweden: 12,721
- Cambodia: 11,969
- Mexico: 11,897
- India: 11,273
- United Arab Emirates: 10,930
- Denmark: 9,581
- Netherlands: 8,601
- Norway: 7,667

Languages
- Korean, various local languages

Related ethnic groups
- Korean people

=== Americas ===
==== Argentina ====
Buenos Aires's 'Barrio Coreano' is in the neighborhood of Flores, specifically in the south of this neighborhood. The primary artery of the district is Avenida Carabobo, which houses various Korean businesses and organizations, including restaurants, beauty salons, a Korean school (Instituto Coreano Argentino) and churches, among others. In recent years, there has been a huge move from the Bajo Flores towards the Avellaneda Avenue, the reason being the increasing theft and insecurity around the slums close to Avenida Castanares. What some might call these days "The New Koreatown" has been increasing in size at a faster rate while the shops in Avenida Carabobo have been closing. There are over 22,000 Koreans in Argentina, most of them in Buenos Aires, where the Asian population is around 2.5%.

==== Brazil ====
Brazil has several Korean enclaves but, recently a Koreatown was formed in Bom Retiro a densely populated area of Brazil's biggest city, São Paulo. It is also a Korean gastronomic center. There are traditional dishes such as bibimbap and samgyeopsal or a good cup of coffee at a cafe like the ones in Seoul. There are also Korean markets with hard-to-find Hansik ingredients such as gochujang, soybean sauce and sesame oil. Korean culture is also well preserved in there. Korean culture is mixed with that of Brazil in this neighborhood: Posters with Hangul written on them are alongside those in Portuguese, and most people are fluent in both Korean and Portuguese in the area.

Also, the residents of Bom Retiro preserve Korean culture while making it more vigorous and active. Cultural festivals including K-pop concerts are held there frequently, and many museums or workshops allow visitors to experience traditional Korean culture. Quite a few Korean artists also live in this community. For instance, Hwang Young-ah uses Bom Retiro as a platform to exhibit her collections and cultivate her artistic talent. And the Hallyu Cultural Center was opened a few years ago to offer a variety of programs on Korean culture including classes in the Korean language, K-pop dance and traditional handicrafts.

The city of Fortaleza in Ceará state hosted many immigrants from South Korea in Brazil.

The Korean consulate in Brazil said that the municipal government in São Paulo has designated Bom Retiro as 'Koreatown' and could pass an ordinance that will see the city provide administrative and financial support to the new community.

==== Chile ====
The Korean population of Chile is mostly concentrated in Patronato in Santiago. Currently, approximately 3000 Koreans live in Chile. The Korean community is well organized and united. Colonia Coreana organizes several events annually. Among these events are: soccer tournaments, Korean festivals, and the annual Mr. and Ms. Patronato.

==== Mexico ====
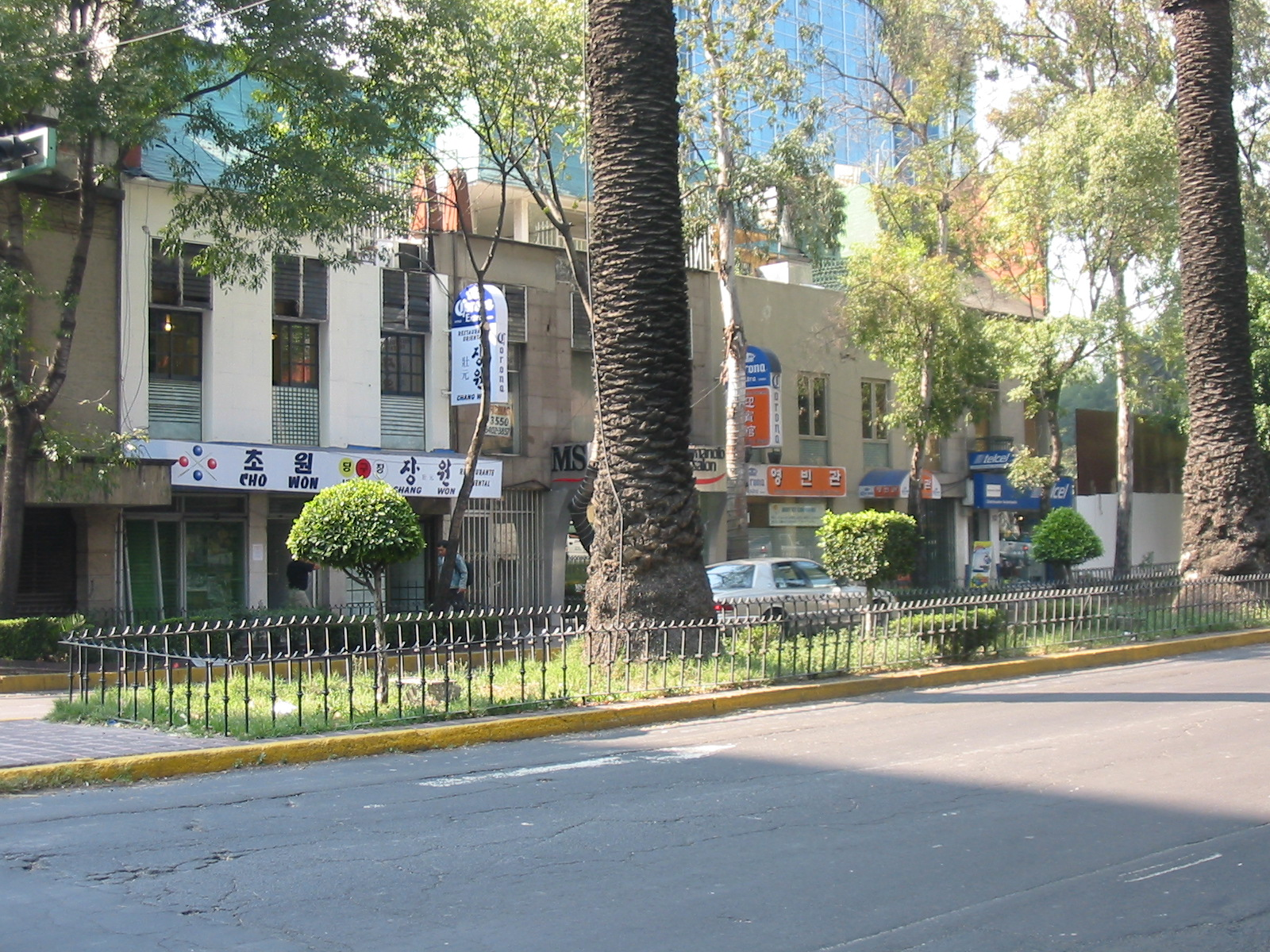
South Korean businesses on Florencia Street in Mexico City

Mexico has a large Korean population that lives in and around Zona Rosa in Mexico City. According to the newspaper Reforma, there are at least 1,000 Koreans living in Zona Rosa and about 3,000 total in Colonia Juárez, the larger official neighborhood of which Zona Rosa is a part. The area around Hamburgo, Praga, Florencia, and Biarritz streets converted into “Pequeño Seul,” or Little Seoul in the 1990s before receding since then.

==== Canada ====
===== Toronto, Ontario =====
Toronto officially designated the area on Bloor Street from Bathurst Street to Christie St. as Koreatown in 2004.^{[12]} According to the 2001 census Toronto had roughly 43,000 Koreans living in the city,^{[13]} and in 2011 the numbers have grown to 64,755.^{[14]} The Korean community in Toronto has developed Koreatown such that it offers a Korean grocery store,^{[15]}hairdressers, karaoke bars and a multitude of restaurants.^{[16]} The City of Toronto describes Koreatown as "primarily a business district offering a wide range of Korean restaurants, high-end-fashion Korean boutiques, herbalists, acupuncturist and many other unique services and shops which are filled with made-in-Korea merchandise."^{[12]} Koreatown Toronto is also known for its Spring Dano Festival, which is run on the 5th day of 5th month of the Korean Lunar Calendar. The festival is run in the Christie Pits area and has been run for the past 21 years with the exception of 2013 when it was cancelled.^{[12][17]} Today, although many Koreans work in the area, very few Koreans actually live there. An influx of Latino immigrants is changing the demographics of the area today.

Koreatown North is the unofficial name for the area situated along Yonge Street from Sheppard Avenue in North York, an administrative area in northern Toronto, to Clark Avenue in neighboring Thornhill, Ontario. This area does not have official signage as they are mixed with establishments catering to Persians and Chinese clientele.

===== Vancouver, British Columbia =====
The highest concentration of Koreans is found near Lougheed Town Centre in Burnaby, British Columbia and in the adjacent city of Coquitlam. Along the North Road (from Delestre Ave (South) to Burquitlam Skytrain Station (North)), sizable supermarkets such as Hannam Supermarket and H Mart, hair shops, Korean restaurants, bars, law firms, accountants' offices, realty offices, child care, clinics and auto repair shops are to be found. For a few years, following the housing boom, the number of Korean Canadians has increased in Langley, Surrey, Port Coquitlam, Maple Ridge, Mission and Abbotsford, and more businesses are opening up shops and offices in east Metro Vancouver and Fraser Valley.

==== United States ====
The first large group of Korean immigrants settled in the United States between 1901 and 1905. Between those years 7,226 immigrants, including 6,048 men, 637 women, and 541 children, came on 65 trips. Most of the early immigrants of that period had some contract with American missionaries in Korea. For some Western-oriented Korean intellectuals, immigrating to the United States was considered useful, in part, to help them in the modernization of their homeland. Consequently, the recruiter for labourers for the Hawaiian Sugar Planters' Association (HSPA), David Deshler, had no trouble finding Koreans from a wide range of social classes willing to sail to Hawaii.

San Francisco, Dinuba, and Riverside, California have a claim as the first Korean U.S. settlement.

===== Atlanta, Georgia =====
In 2010, Atlanta has a population of approximately 94,000 individuals of Korean descent. Atlanta's Koreatown is mostly centered around the corridor extending from Duluth, Georgia, westward along Buford Highway into northeast Atlanta and Suwanee, Georgia. KoreanBeacon named Atlanta #5 in its list of Top Korean-American cities, citing the Korean population in Gwinnett County, GA (which contains Duluth) doubling over the past decade, in addition to large stretches of Buford Highway being populated with retail and services with many signs in Korean. Atlanta also has four Korean-language television stations broadcast in the Atlanta area, in addition to a local daily Korean newspaper, the Atlanta ChoSun.

===== Aurora, Colorado =====
Roughly two thousand Korean immigrants live in Aurora, and the stretch of Havana Street running from Mississippi Avenue to Iliff Avenue contains a very high number of Korean businesses. A motion to designate the surrounding area as an official Koreatown was at one time considered by the Aurora City Council.

===== Baltimore, Maryland =====
There is a small portion of lower Charles Village, referred to as the Station North Arts and Entertainment District, is sometimes referred to as Koreatown or Little Korea and is home to a number of Korean restaurants, but it has not been officially designated as a Koreatown. This developing Koreatown is bounded on the north by 24th Street, on the south by North Avenue, on the west by Maryland Avenue, and on the east by St. Paul Street. Meanwhile, suburban Ellicott City, Maryland and Catonsville, Maryland has also developed Koreatowns, along Route 40.

===== Boston, Massachusetts =====
Boston's Koreatown is in Allston Village and includes parts of Cambridge Street and Brighton, Harvard, and Commonwealth Avenues, with a growing Korean and Korean American residential and commercial presence.

===== Chicago, Illinois =====
Chicago's Albany Park neighborhood has been referred to as Chicago's "Koreatown" since the 1980s. The majority of Korean shops in Albany Park can be found along Lawrence Avenue (4800 North) between Kedzie (3200 West) and Pulaski (4000 West). This particular section of Lawrence Avenue has been officially designated by the city of Chicago as "Seoul Drive" because of the multitude of Korean-owned enterprises on the street. Although many of the Korean Americans in the neighborhood have been moving to the north suburbs in recent years, it still retains its Korean flavor. Every year there is a Korean festival, and the neighborhood is home to a Korean television station (WOCH-CD Ch. 41) and radio station (1330 AM) as well as two Korean-language newspapers. There are still many Korean businesses interspersed among the newer Mexican bakeries and Middle Eastern grocery stores. Approximately 45% of the businesses on this particular stretch of Lawrence Avenue are owned by Korean-Americans.

===== Columbus, Ohio =====
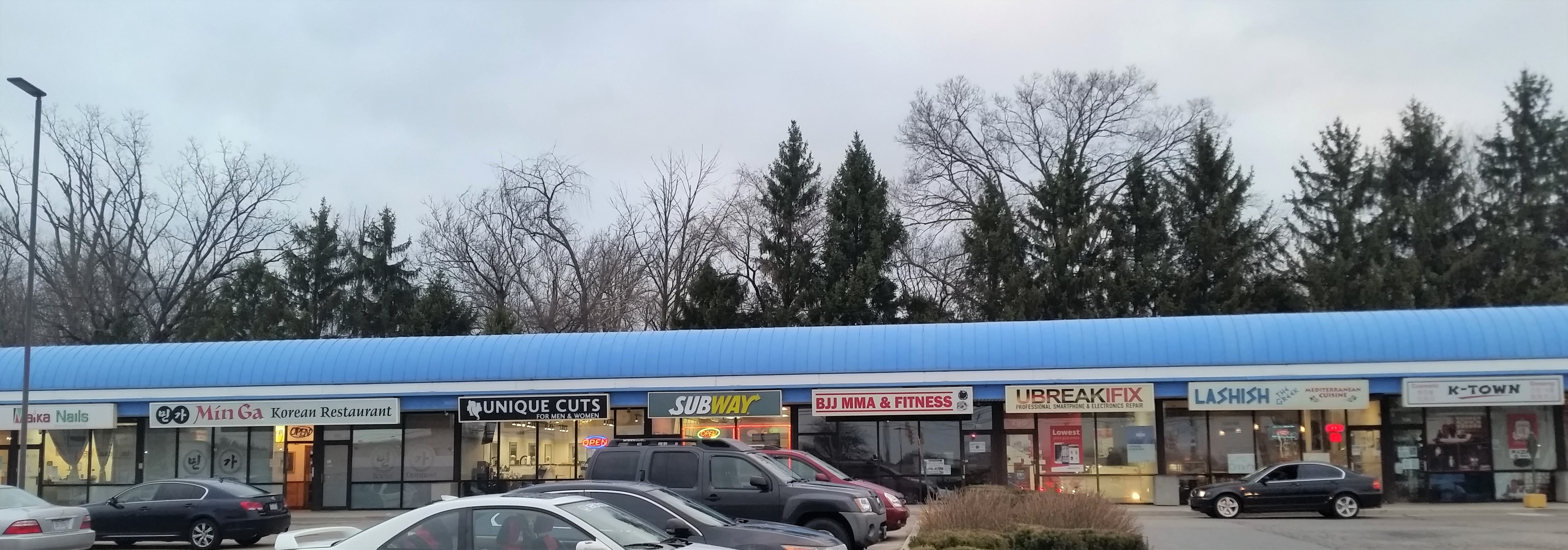
This strip mall on Bethel Road in Columbus, Ohio includes a Korean nail salon, a Korean restaurant, a Korean beauty products store, and a Korean grocery store.

Koreatown is in the vicinity of Bethel and Henderson Roads in Northwest Columbus. This area includes several Korean grocery stores, churches, and restaurants.

===== Dallas, Texas =====
Dallas has the largest Korean-American community in Texas and second (to Atlanta) in the southern United States. A sizable Koreatown can be found in Dallas. In 2023, The state of Texas officially designated the area as a Koreatown in legislation. This area in the Northwest part of the city, known as the Asian Trade District, is characterized by a large number of Korean-owned businesses serving the city's sizable Korean-American community, concentrated along a 1.5 mile strip of Royal Lane between Luna Rd and Harry Hines Blvd. Although Korean business is undoubtedly the most dominant in the area, there are isolated Chinese and Vietnamese businesses as well.

Another Koreatown can be found in Carrollton, Texas, which is part of the greater DFW area. This area is referred to as "New Koreatown" by locals, due to it growing from the arrival of Hmart to the city. Over the years, more and more restaurants and shops have opened around the Hmart.

Ellicott City, Maryland

Ellicott City is home to the officially-designated Koreatown in Maryland.

===== Honolulu, Hawaii =====
Korean businesses congregate on Keeaumoku Street, which earned the nickname "Koreamoku." As of 2016 it has been officially designated as a Koreatown. Roughly bounded by Kalakaua Ave (East), Kapiolani Blvd. (South), King St. (North) and Keeaumoku St. (West). With recent gentrification and condominiums pricing out Korean merchants in the Ke‘eaumoku district, a new Koreatown is emerging in downtown Honolulu.

===== Houston, Texas =====
Spring Branch in Houston is considered to have the largest Koreatown in the Houston area.

===== Orange County, California =====
Orange County, California is home to two Koreatowns. They are located in Garden Grove and Buena Park.

On February 12, 2019, Garden Grove City Council unanimously voted to rename and designate the historic Korean business district on Garden Grove Boulevard between Beach Boulevard (Route 39) and Brookhurst Street in Garden Grove as an official Koreatown.

In 2023, Buena Park City Council unanimously voted to officially name and designate the area between Orangethorpe Avenue and Rosecrans Avenue on Beach Boulevard in Buena Park as Orange County's second Koreatown. The first official signage was installed at the intersection of Beach Boulevard and Orangethorpe Avenue on October 10, 2023.

===== Los Angeles, California =====
The Greater Los Angeles Area is home to the largest number of ethnic Koreans outside of the Korean Peninsula. Koreatown is an officially recognized district of the city and contains probably the heaviest concentration of Korean residents and businesses. However, when the term "Koreatown" is used it usually refers to a larger area that includes the adjacent neighborhoods of Wilshire Center, Harvard Heights and Pico Heights. Koreans began to move into the area in the late 1960s after changes in US immigration laws as part of the greater Civil Rights Movement (especially the Immigration and Nationality Act of 1965 which formally ended the Chinese Exclusion Act), establishing numerous businesses, although never outnumbering Latino residents. In the aftermath of the 1992 riots, Koreatown entered into a period of development, especially during the 1994 Asian Market Crisis as South Korean investors sought to invest in the then-profitable California real-estate market. More recently, L.A.'s Koreatown has been perceived to have experienced declining political power secondary to re-districting and an increased crime rate, prompting an exodus of Koreans from the area.

===== Newport News, Virginia =====
A Korean Enclave exists on the north end of Newport News, Virginia. It is centered around Denbigh Blvd and Warwick Blvd, following mostly along Warwick Blvd. Originally the area was established as an enclave when Korean War veterans stationed at the nearby Fort Eustis brought home wives from Korea. The area has been affectionately called "little Seoul" because of this. There are numerous shops catering the Korean population of the entire Hampton Roads area. The shops range from hair salons, to grocers, and even a bakery. There are also significant numbers of Taiwanese, Philippine, Vietnamese and other Asian ethnicities in the area.

===== New York metropolitan area =====
As of the 2010 United States census, the self-identified Korean American population in the metropolitan New York Combined Statistical Area was 218,764, the second largest population of ethnic Koreans outside Korea.

According to the 2011 American Community Survey, there were approximately 100,000 Korean Americans in New York City, with two-thirds living in borough of Queens. In particular, Fresh Meadows is home to the most Korean immigrants of any neighbourhood in the city. In Bergen County, New Jersey, where several towns are home to significant Korean populations, the survey counted 63,247 Korean Americans or 6.9% of the total population. The Korean population in borough of Manhattan has nearly doubled to approximately 20,000 since the 2000 Census.

As of 2014, there were 180 franchisees of Korean coffeehouse chain Caffe Bene in the metro area. Korean Air and Asiana Airlines provide non-stop flights from Seoul to JFK Airport.

====== Manhattan ======
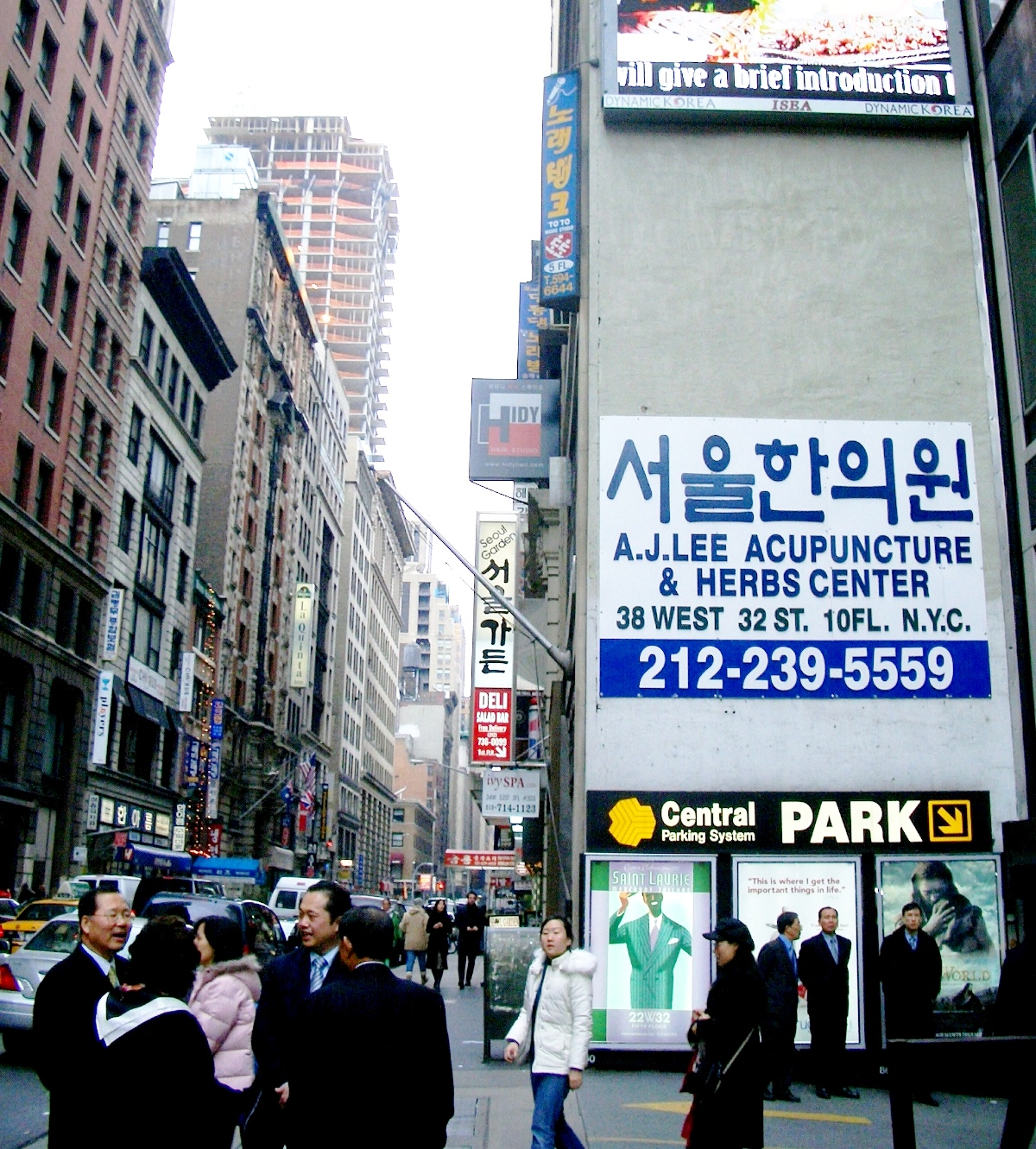
Congregating in Manhattan's Koreatown

In Midtown Manhattan, Koreatown is bordered by 31st and 33rd Streets, Fifth Avenue, and the Avenue of the Americas, close to the Empire State Building and Macy's at Herald Square. The heart of the district is the block of 32nd Street between Fifth Avenue and Broadway, officially nicknamed "Korea Way", which features stores on multiple stories, with small, independently run establishments reaching up to the third or fourth floors, including restaurants, exuding an ambience of Seoul. The New York City Korean Chamber of Commerce estimates there to be more than 100 small businesses on the block. It is home to numerous restaurants that serve both traditional and/or regional Korean cuisine and Korean fusion fare (including Korean Chinese cuisine), several bakeries, grocery stores, supermarkets, bookstores, consumer electronics outlets, video rental shops, tchotchke and stationery shops, hair and nail salons, noraebang bars, nightclubs, as well as cell phone service providers, internet cafés, doctors' offices, banks, and hotels. Approximately twelve 24/7 restaurants conduct business on Korea Way. According to the 2000 Census, a slightly larger area including Koreatown was 46 percent Asian. Koreatown is expanding eastward toward Madison Avenue in Midtown Manhattan.

====== Long Island ======
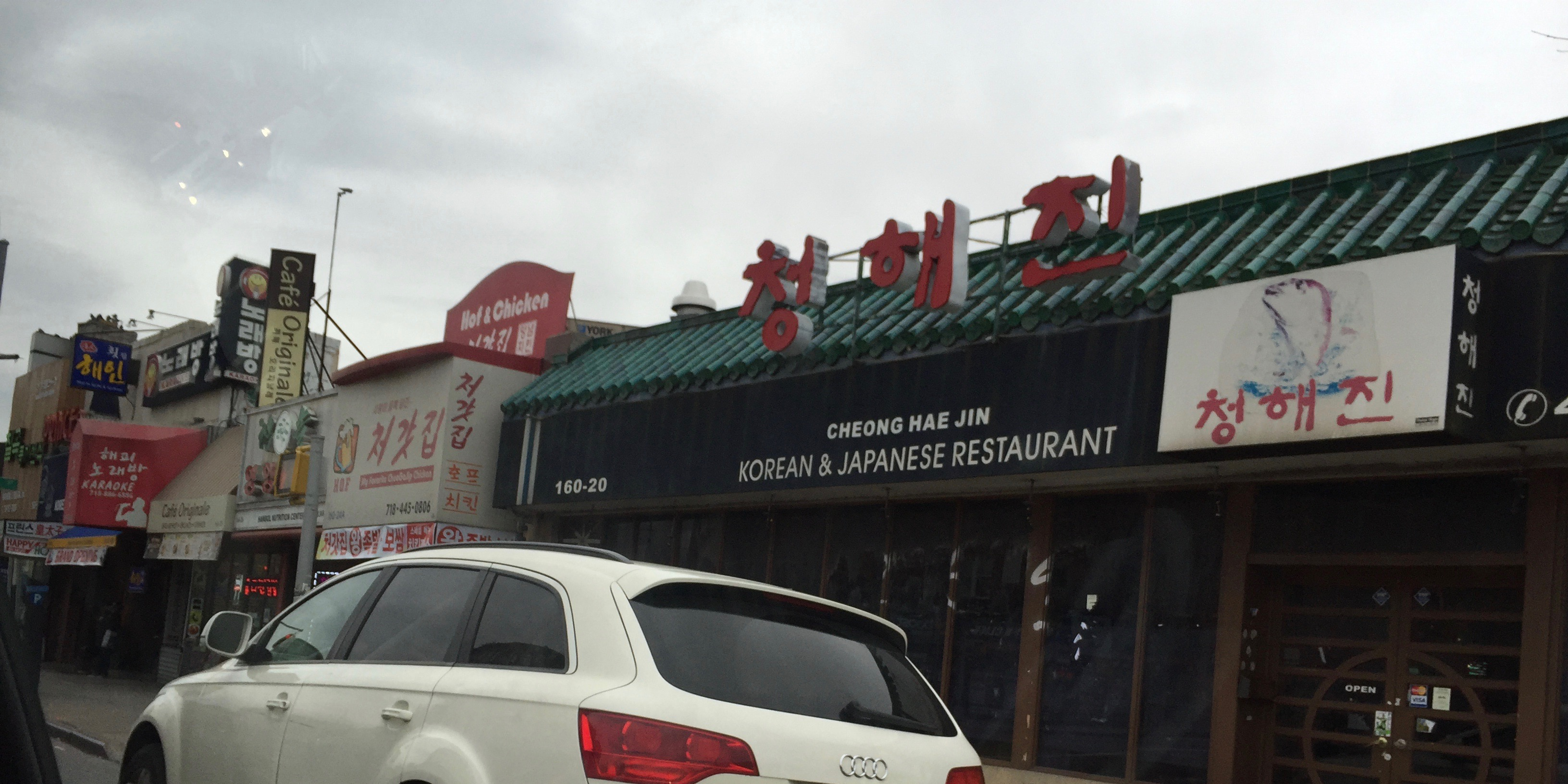
The Long Island Koreatown originated in Flushing, Queens before sprawling eastward along Northern Boulevard and eventually into adjacent suburban Nassau County.

The Long Island Koreatown is one of the largest and fastest growing ethnic enclaves outside Korea. The core of this Koreatown originated in the Flushing neighborhood borough of Queens. It has continued to expand rapidly eastward through the neighborhoods of Murray Hill, Bayside, Douglaston and Little Neck, and into adjacent suburban Nassau County, Long Island. In the 1980s, a continuous stream of Korean immigrants many of whom began as workers in the medical field or Korean international students moved to New York City to find or initiate professional or entrepreneurial positions. They established a foothold on Union Street in Flushing between 35th and 41st Avenues, featuring restaurants and karaoke (noraebang) bars, grocery markets, education centers and bookstores, banking institutions, offices, electronics vendors, apparel boutiques and other commercial enterprises. As the community grew more affluent and rose in socioeconomic status, Koreans moved eastward along Northern Boulevard, buying homes in more affluent and less crowded Queens neighborhoods and Nassau County, bringing their businesses with them. The eastward pressure was created in part by the inability to move westward due to the formidable presence of the enormous Flushing Chinatown (法拉盛華埠; Fǎlā Shèng Huá Bù) centered on Main Street. The expansion led to the creation of an American Meokjagolmok or Restaurant Street, around the Murray Hill station of Long Island Rail Road station which is reminiscent of Seoul. According to The New York Times, a "Kimchi Belt" stretches along Northern Boulevard and the Long Island Rail Road tracks, from Flushing into Nassau County; while according to a Korean food chef, "Queens is the closest you can come to authentic Korean food". The Long Island Koreatown features numerous restaurants that serve both traditional and/or regional Korean cuisine. Korean Chinese cuisine is also available in the Long Island Koreatown.

====== Bergen County ======
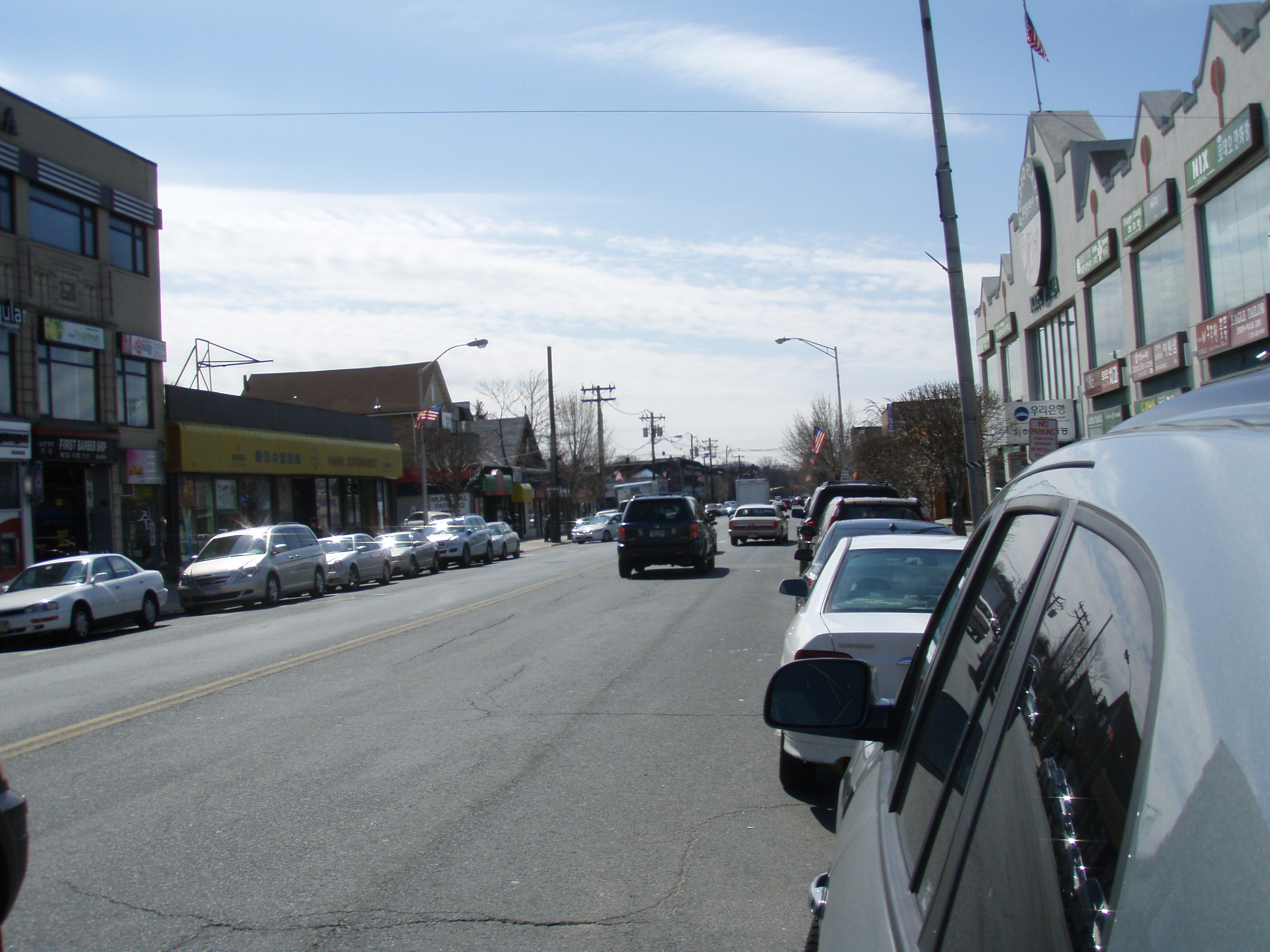
Broad Avenue, Koreatown in Palisades Park, Bergen County, New Jersey, where Koreans comprise the majority (52%) of the population

Koreans began moving to Eastern Bergen County, New Jersey in the 1980s and by the 1990s, several enclaves were established. According to the 2010 Census, Bergen County had the highest per capita population of Koreans of any United States county, at 6.3%, including all of the nation's top ten municipalities by percentage of Korean population. In 2012, the county mandated the publication of voting ballots in the Korean language. The two most prominent Koreatowns are centered along Broad Avenue in Palisades Park and Leonia, Ridgefield and around the intersection of Main Street and Lemoine Avenue in Fort Lee, close to the George Washington Bridge. Both districts have developed dining destinations for Korean cuisine, while Broad Avenue in Palisades Park has evolved into a dessert destination as well. Koreatown, Palisades Park has been nicknamed the Korean village and Koreatown on the Hudson. The Chusok Korean Thanksgiving harvest festival has become an annual tradition celebrated in Overpeck County Park. Korean chaebols have established North American headquarters operations in Bergen County, including Samsung, LG Corp, and Hanjin Shipping. Korean professionals have also expanded northward into the Northern Valley area and more recently, into adjacent Rockland County, New York. Route 303 in Tappan, New York, Rockland County, has become the hub of Korean activity in the Lower Hudson Valley area.

===== Oakland, California =====
The largest concentration of Korean businesses and community services in the San Francisco Bay Area is centered on Oakland's Telegraph Avenue between 20th and 35th Streets between Downtown Oakland and the Temescal district. Roughly 150 Korean-owned businesses are located in the neighborhood, including a shopping center and Korean American community centers. This segment of Telegraph Avenue is lined with bright banners proclaiming the district as "Koreatown-Northgate" with the slogan "Oakland's got Seoul" and accompanied by an annual cultural festival. Officially named "Koreatown-Northgate" (abbreviated KONO), the area was characterized by urban decay before Korean Americans began opening businesses and reviving the area in the late 1980s and early 1990s. Before 1991, the area was characterized by homelessness and crime and was known as the Northgate district. The aftermath of the Los Angeles Riots of 1992 also saw a large number of Koreans from Southern California moving to the Bay Area and opening businesses and buying property in the district on a large scale. There has been criticism from the non-Korean residents about the city officially naming the district Koreatown, mostly from the African American population who form the majority in the area. Despite Korean Americans owning much of the property in the neighborhood, the largest group of residents still remains African American. Tensions remain between African Americans and Koreans in the neighborhood, which has witnessed declines in both populations. Despite some Koreans continuing to move into the neighborhood, the majority of the Bay Area's Korean population is concentrated in the suburbs surrounding Oakland and in the South Bay.

===== Philadelphia, Pennsylvania =====
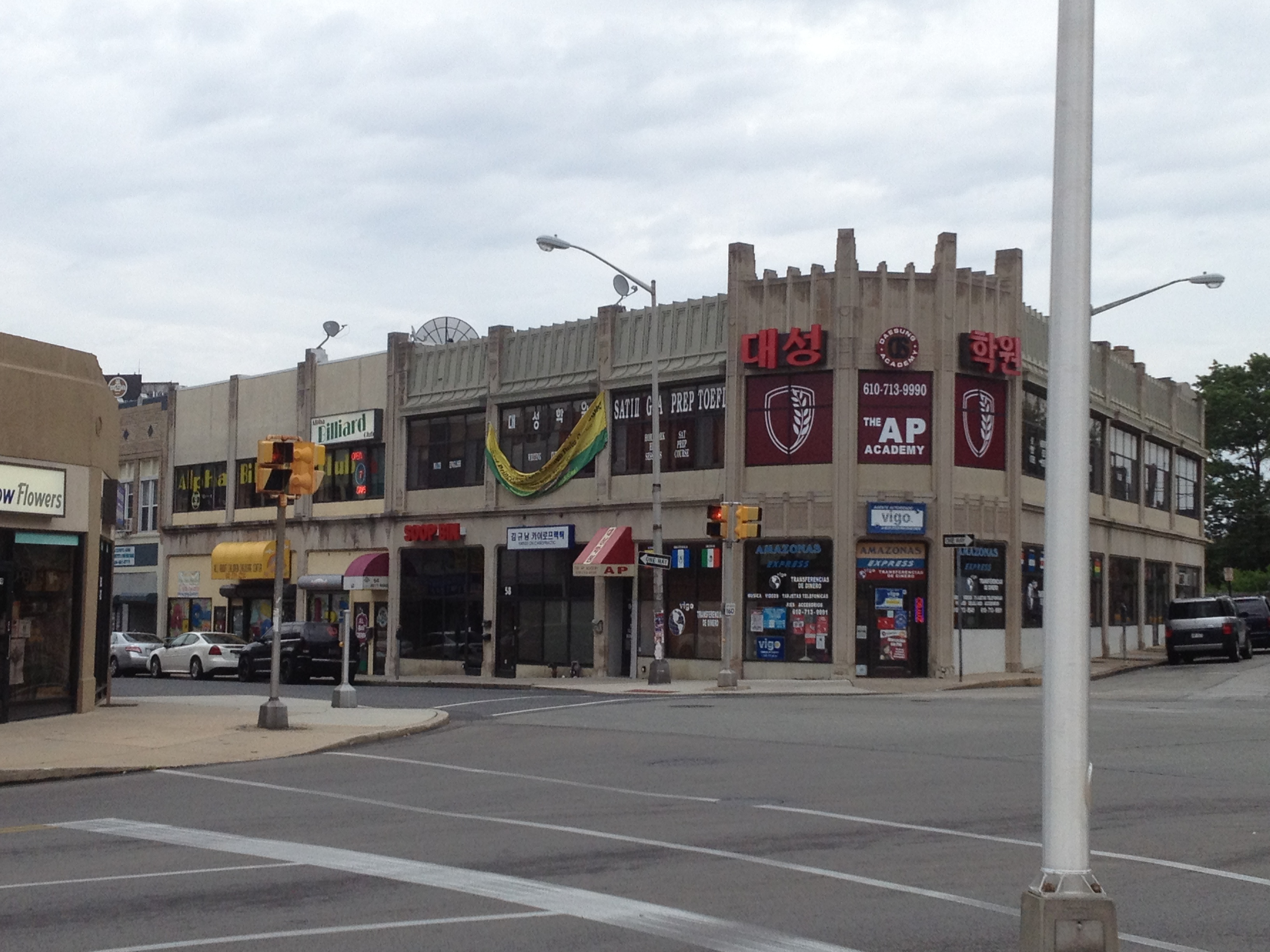
Upper Darby is one area around Philadelphia where there are significant pockets of Korean people, at Fairfield Avenue and Garrett Road.

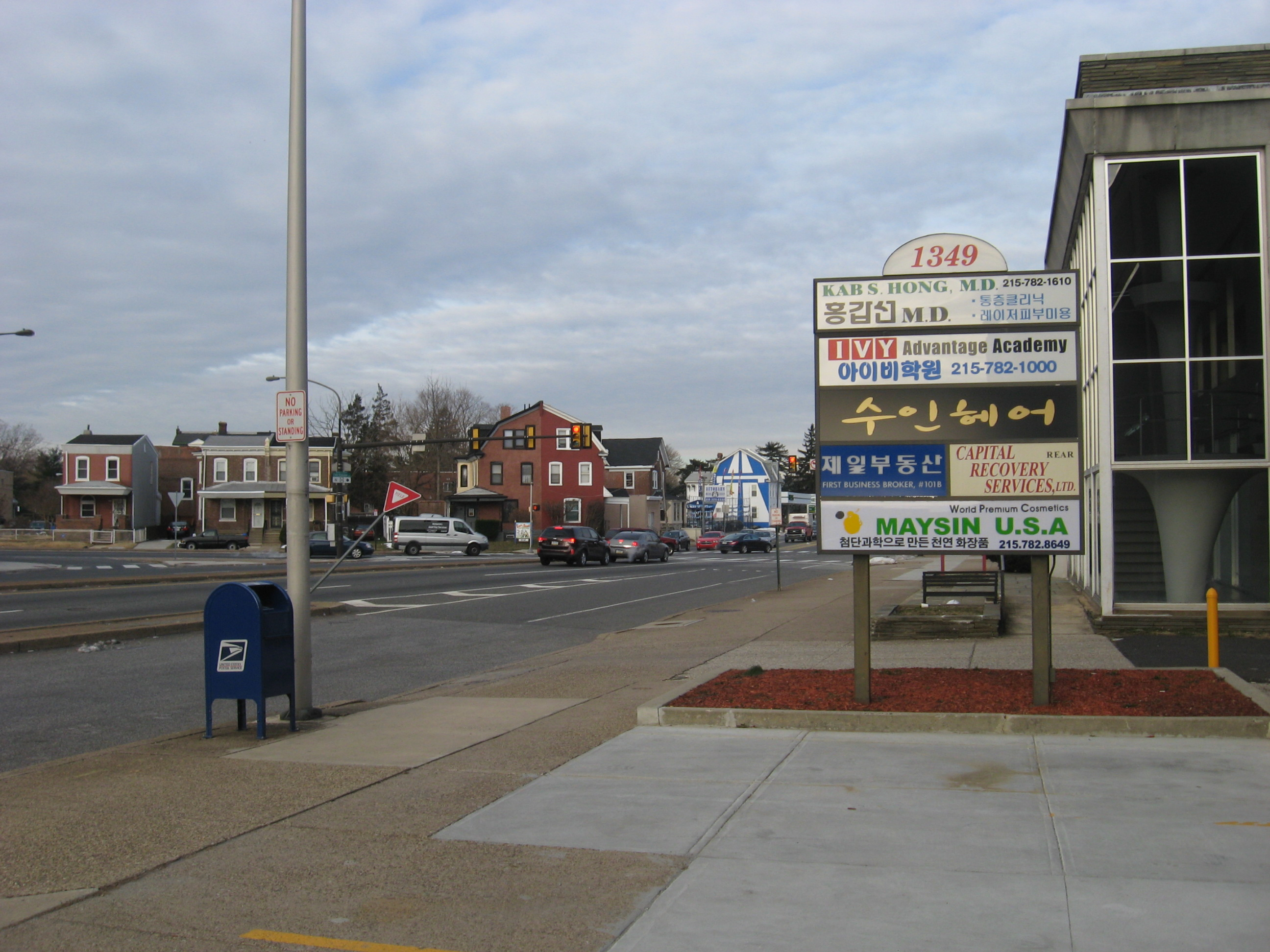
Professional offices along Cheltenham Avenue in Cheltenham Township, Pennsylvania, another area in the Philadelphia region with a significant Korean population

Philadelphia's first Koreatown is located in the Olney section of the city. Since the late 1980s, the Korean community has expanded to the north and now straddles the border between Philadelphia proper and the suburb of Cheltenham, though many Korean American businesses and organizations and some residents remain in Olney and adjoining neighborhoods. Upper Darby Township, bordering West Philadelphia, also has a large Korean American population; meanwhile, a rapidly growing Korean population and commercial presence has emerged in nearby suburban Cherry Hill, New Jersey since 2010, centered along Marlton Pike.

===== Washington, D.C. =====
Koreatown in Annandale, Virginia starts at the intersection of Little River Turnpike and Hummer Road, runs for 1.5 miles to the turnpike's intersection with Evergreen Lane and provides a hub for the 93,787 individuals of Korean descent residing in the Washington-Baltimore-Northern Virginia, DC-MD-VA-WV Combined Statistical Area, as estimated by the 2009 American Community Survey. According to the Boston Globe, over 1,000 Korean-owned businesses are in Annandale. They cater to Koreans as well as non-Koreans. Businesses and establishments include accountants, banks, bakeries, billiards, bookstores, churches, college preparatory classrooms, cybercafés, department stores, newspapers, optometrists, real estate offices, restaurants and salons.

=== East Asia ===
==== Mainland China ====
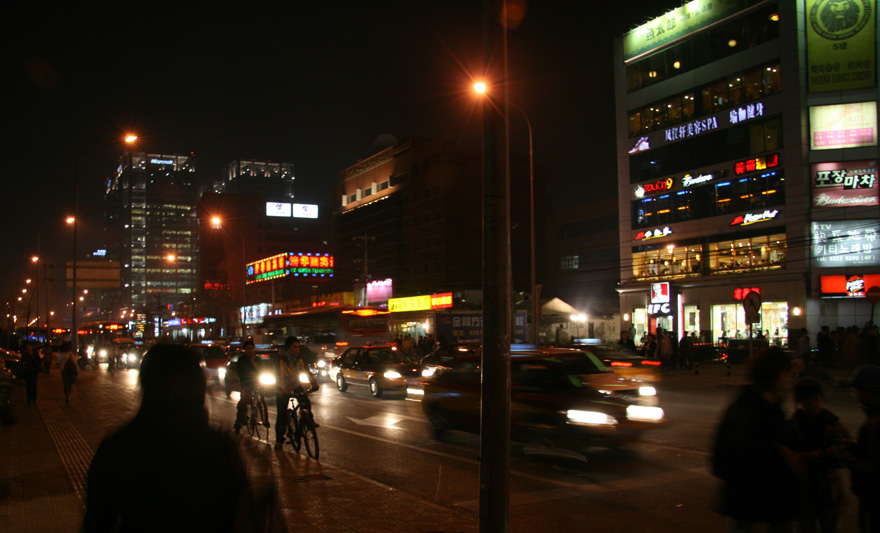
Koreatown in the Wudaokou neighborhood in the Haidian district of Beijing

The population of Koreans in China include millions of descendants of Korean immigrants with citizenship of the People's Republic of China, as well as smaller groups of South and North Korean migrants, with a total of roughly 2.3 million people as of 2009. China has the largest ethnic Korean population living outside mainland Korea.

Yanbian Korean Autonomous Prefecture has 854,000 ethnic Koreans living there who are Joseonjok or Chosŏnjok (Korean: 조선족), Cháoxīanzú (Chinese: 朝鮮族) and form one of the 56 ethnicities officially recognized by the Chinese government.

===== Beijing =====
There are roughly 200,000 Koreans living in Beijing, including 120,000 Chosŏnjok/Joseonjok (ethnic Korean citizens of China) and about 80,000 South Korean migrants. Prominent areas include Wudaokou and Wangjing.

There are two Koreatowns in Beijing: The bigger Korean enclave is in Wangjing in the Chaoyang district. There are many Korean companies who have established their businesses in Wangjing. Wangjing also has an all-Korean international school (all grade levels) in the Wangjing vicinity. Many of the Korean businesses in Wangjing cater towards families, businessmen, students and tourists with restaurants, bath houses/spas, bookstores, clubs/bars, golfing and Korean banks. Although Wangjing is known as a Korean district, there is a great number of third- and fourth-generation Korean Chinese ethnic minorities who live and coexist with South Korean nationals.

The second Koreatown, Wudaokou, is in the Haidian district where most of the city's universities are. Because of the vibrant university scene in Wudaokou, there are many Korean college students who live and attend universities in this area.

Although the Korean districts are on different ends of the city, Wangjing and Wudaokou are connected by subway line 13.

===== Qingdao =====
An estimated 182,000 ethnic Koreans live in Qingdao, Shandong Province, including 134,000 Chosŏnjok/Joseonjok and 48,000 South Korean migrants.

===== Shenyang =====
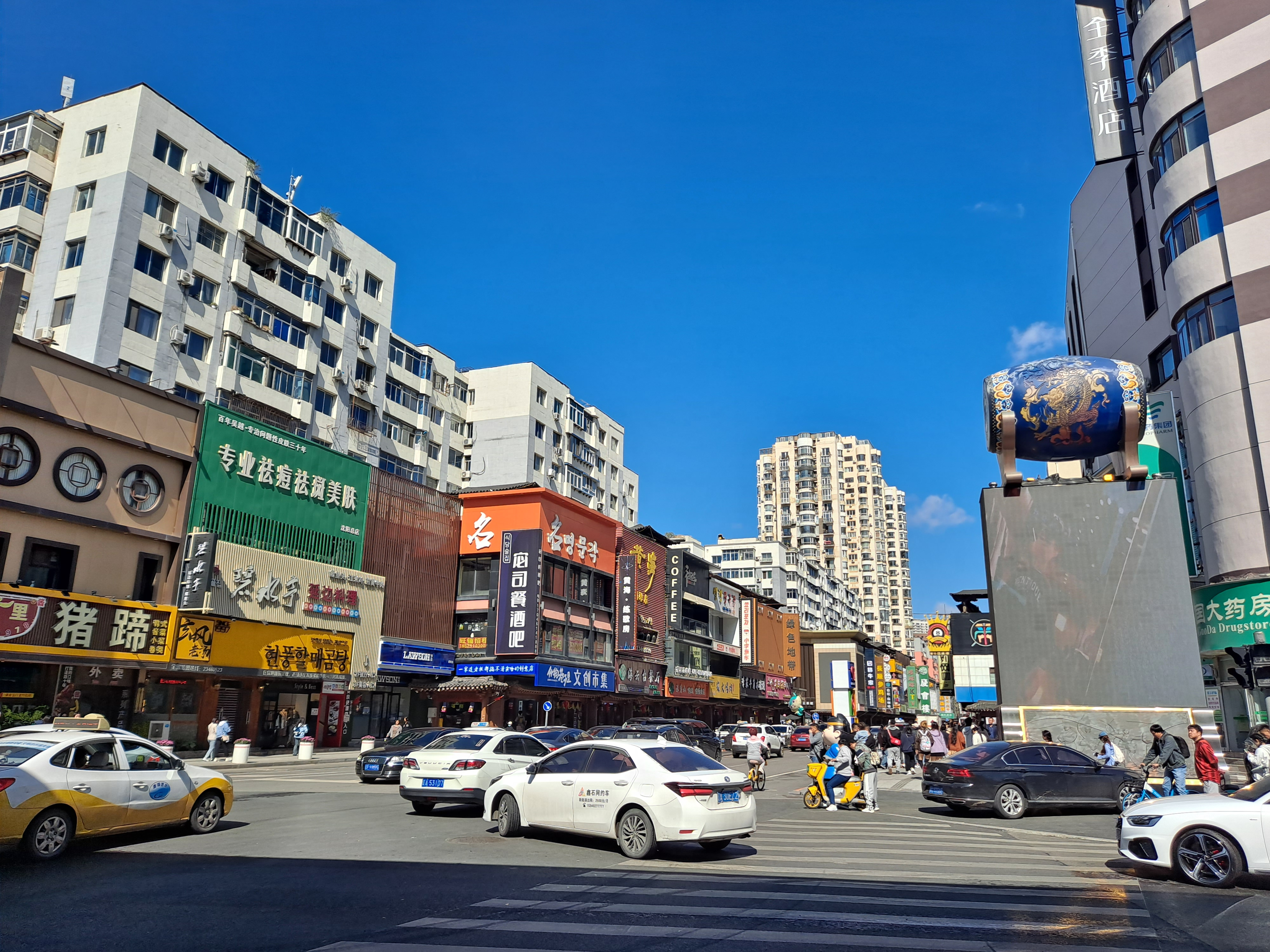
Koreatown, Shenyang

Shenyang has a large Koreatown known as Xita/Sŏtap/Seotap (Chinese: 西塔; pinyin: Xītǎ; Korean: 서탑, Seotab) meaning Western Pagoda. Both North and South Korea have consulates in Shenyang but in different districts.

===== Shanghai =====
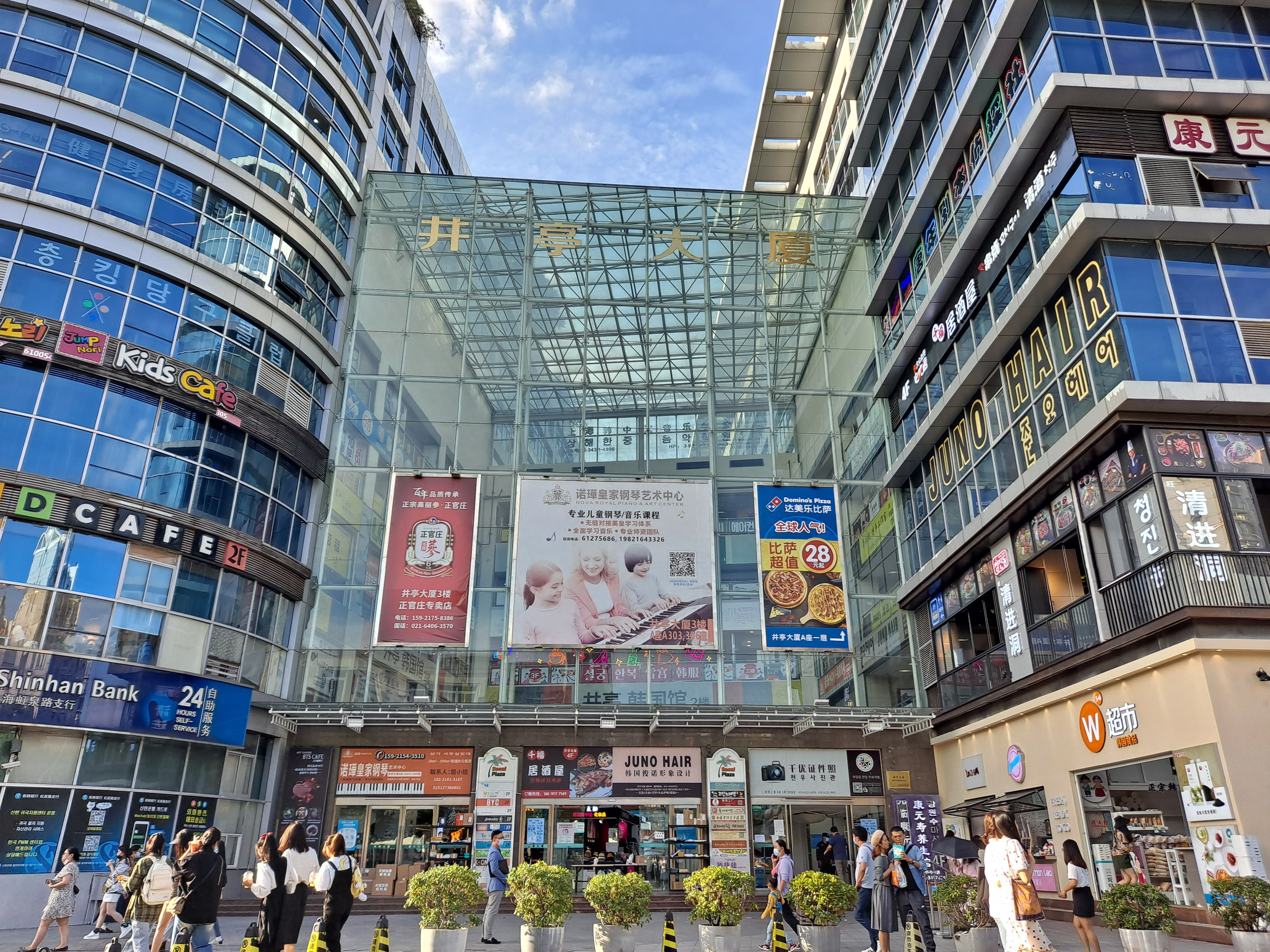
Koreatown, Shanghai

86,000 Koreans live in Shanghai, including 65,000 Chosŏnjok/Joseonjok and 21,000 South Korean migrants. Longbai in the Minhang district, to the west of the city, has a Korean-oriented neighborhood.

==== Hong Kong ====
In 2011, there were 13,288 individuals of Korean descent in Hong Kong. Kimberley Street in Tsim Sha Tsui has Korean restaurants and grocery stores; and is known by the local nicknames Korean Street and Little Korea (Chinese: 小韓國).

==== Japan ====
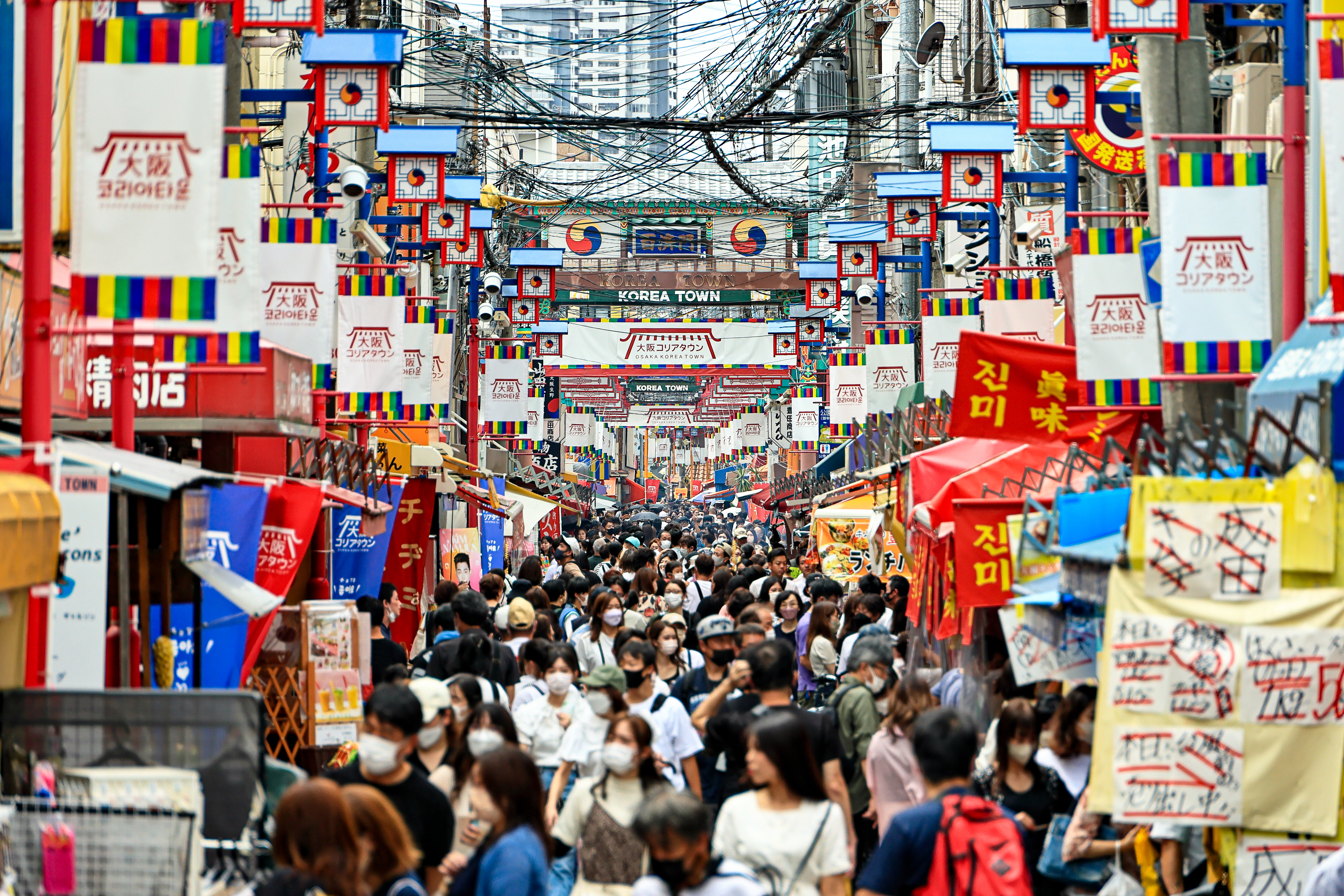
Osaka Korea Town

During the Korea under Japanese rule, approximately 2.4 million ethnic Koreans emigrated to Japan. Some for economic reasons and some were forced to move during the Second World War to work as laborers. While most departed after the war, still many chose to remain and were joined in the 1950s by a wave of refugees from Jeju Island. Today, Koreans, known as Zainichi Koreans, are the third largest ethnic minority in Japan, amounting to 432,000 in 2024. Those with North Korean ties are a key source of remittances to North Korea. There is a separate group of more recent migrants from South Korea with strong links to their home country, and there is a considerable cultural gap between these so-called "newcomers" and the Zainichi Koreans.

A shantytown of former forced laborers, Utoro district, exists in Uji, part of Kyoto Prefecture.

===== Osaka =====
Ikuno Korea Town in Osaka has a population of over 57,000, making it the largest in Japan. In Ikuno Ward, 1% of the inhabitants are of Korean origin. Tsuruhashi in the Ward is the largest Koreatown in Japan and is dominated by Jeju Islanders. Imazato-Shinchi is an area increasingly dominated by recent South Korean "new-comers". The total Korean population in Osaka prefecture amounted to 93,000 in 2022.

===== Tokyo =====
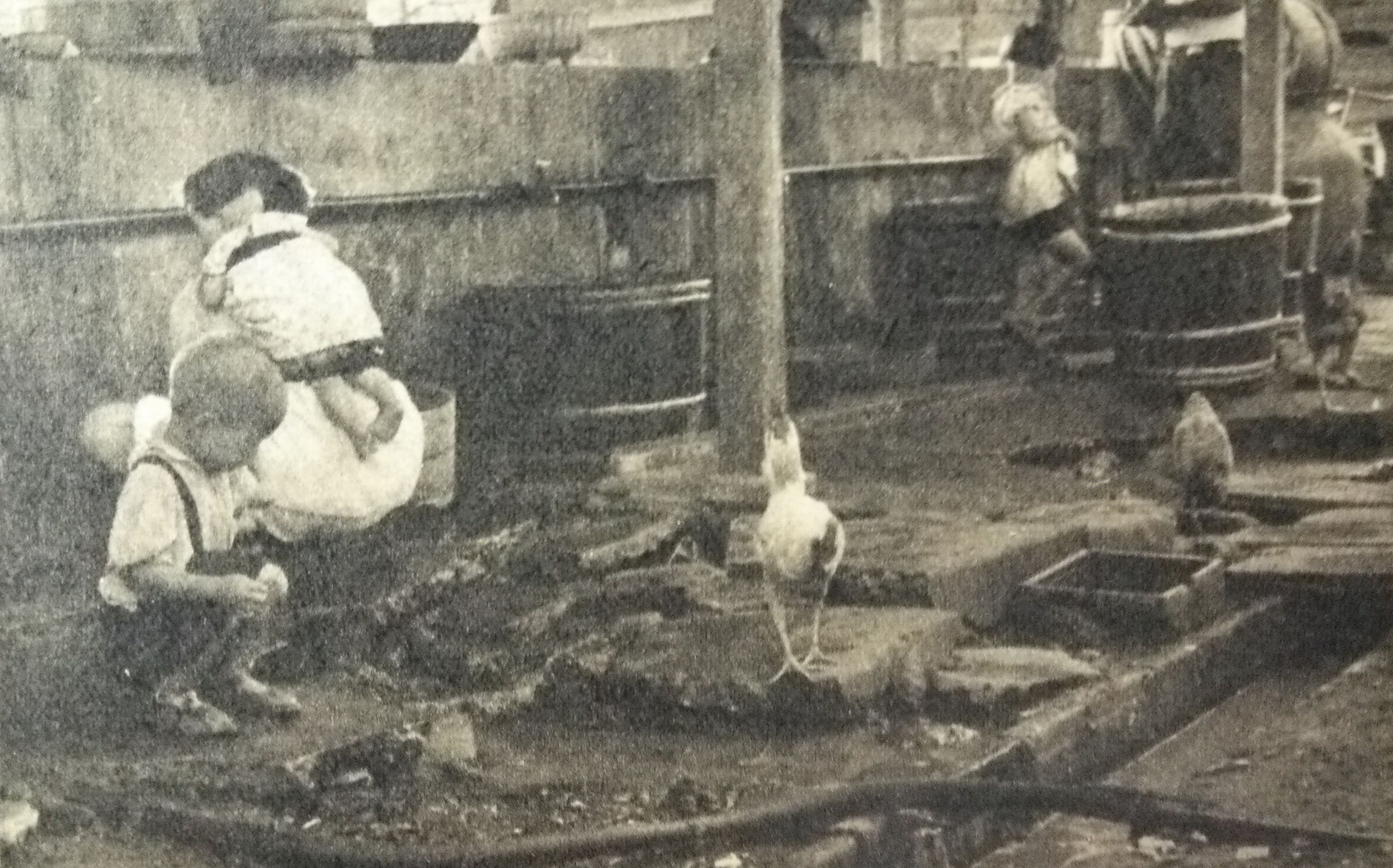
Edakawa Korean Town, Koto, Tokyo in 1953

According to official statistics in 2024, the Korean population in Tokyo amounted to 96,000, which was the second largest following that of Osaka.

Tokyo's Korean-oriented commercial centre is located in the district of Okubo around the area of Shin-Okubo Station and Okubo Station in Shinjuku Ward. Shinjuku Ward itself has over 9,100 registered Korean residents, representing over 10% of the registered Korean residents in Tokyo. Unlike other Japanese Koreatowns, the Okubo Koreatown developed after World War II and is dominated by "new-comers" - recent immigrants from South Korea who have retained their ethnic and cultural identity, as can be seen from the ubiquitous signs written in hangul.

One of the contributing factors in the development of Okubo into a Korean area was the low rents. The low rents and willingness of landlords to accept foreign tenants attracted Korean and other Asian migrants to the area. These businesses cater to the migrant community and increasingly Japanese who come to experience ethnic cuisine. Other immigrants from China, Taiwan, Southeast Asia, and various other nationalities including Muslim and Nepali operated stores make this one of the most colourful and multicultural areas in Tokyo.

The area around Mikawashima station on the Jōban Line, to the north of the city, is a Koreatown dominated by Zainichi immigrants from Jeju Island.

Also noteworthy is a smaller-scale Zainichi Korean quarter to the southeast of Ueno station, and to the southwest, a community of South Korean "new-comers".

===== Shimonoseki =====
Green Mall in Shimonoseki, Yamaguchi Prefecture is a Koreatown. It is also known as "Little Pusan" partly because of the Kanpu ferry that goes to the city of Pusan in South Korea.

==== Taiwan ====
A small Koreatown exists in Zhongxing Street located in Yonghe District, New Taipei City

=== Southeast Asia ===
==== Indonesia ====
Korean presence in Indonesia goes back to several decades, in 1982, A Koreatown began to form in South Jakarta's Kebayoran Baru subdistrict, when Kim Woo-jae opened a shop selling kimchi and doenjang.

A 31,000 m^{2} Koreatown block is being constructed on north Jakarta Pulomas. Upon its completion, it will be the first artificially made Koreatown in the world with 7 blocks and 9 buildings.

Koreans in Indonesia number approximately 40,000, which makes Indonesia the 12th largest country with Koreans living outside Korea.

==== Malaysia ====
===== Kuala Lumpur =====
There are more than 20,000 Koreans living in the capital of Malaysia. Sri Hartamas is an affluent residential township in the city which houses many migrants families, particularly from Korea. There are two Korean supermarkets in the area - Seoul Mart and Lotte Mart, various Korean restaurants and many Korean hair salons. Malaysia's first officially registered school for Korean nationals, the Malaysia Korean School, was established on 7 December 1974; it had 26 teachers and enrolled 148 students as of 2006. It is located on Jalan Ampang.

==== Philippines ====
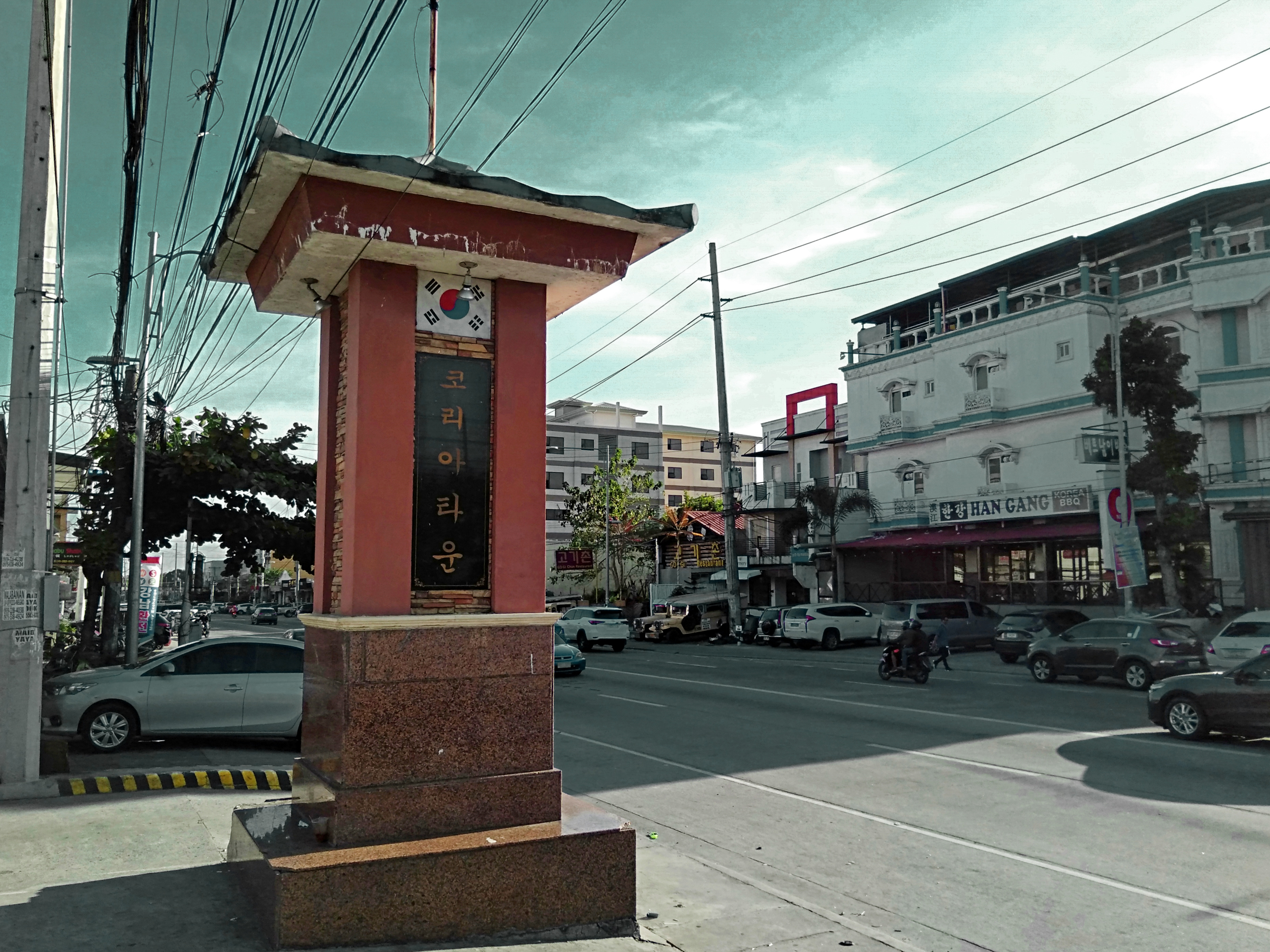
The entrance of Koreatown in Angeles, Pampanga serves as a welcome of Filipino-Korean Communities within the city, a number of various Korean Establishments and significant Ethnic Koreans that concentrated in Fil-Am Friendship Highway.

The most well-known Koreatown in the Metro Manila area is located in Makati's Barangay Poblacion. Most of the Korean businesses can be found in the area bounded north–south by JP Rizal Avenue and Jupiter, and east–west by Makati Avenue and Rockwell Drive, with P. Burgos running roughly through the middle of the area. In Quezon City, the Kalayaan Plaza Building has various Korean businesses, apartments and a church (one of seven or eight Korean churches in QC that existed in 2005).

On Angeles, Pampanga. Anunas is the barangay that houses the city's Koreatown, a chain of Korean establishments along the Fil-Am Friendship Highway. Anunas is also identified as one of the growth centers of the city, focusing on light industries such as woodcarving and rattan craft.

In Iloilo City, a commercialized Koreatown known as K-Town, located in Iloilo Business Park, features a lineup of Korean stores and restaurants. Since its establishment, it has become the primary venue for most Korean-related activities in the city. K-Town is also home to a commemorative historical marker celebrating the friendship between the Ilonggo and Korean people.

Currently, Manila Mayor Isko Moreno and South Korea Ambassador to the Philippines Kim Inchul are in talks about establishing a "Korea Town" in Manila's Malate district

==== Singapore ====
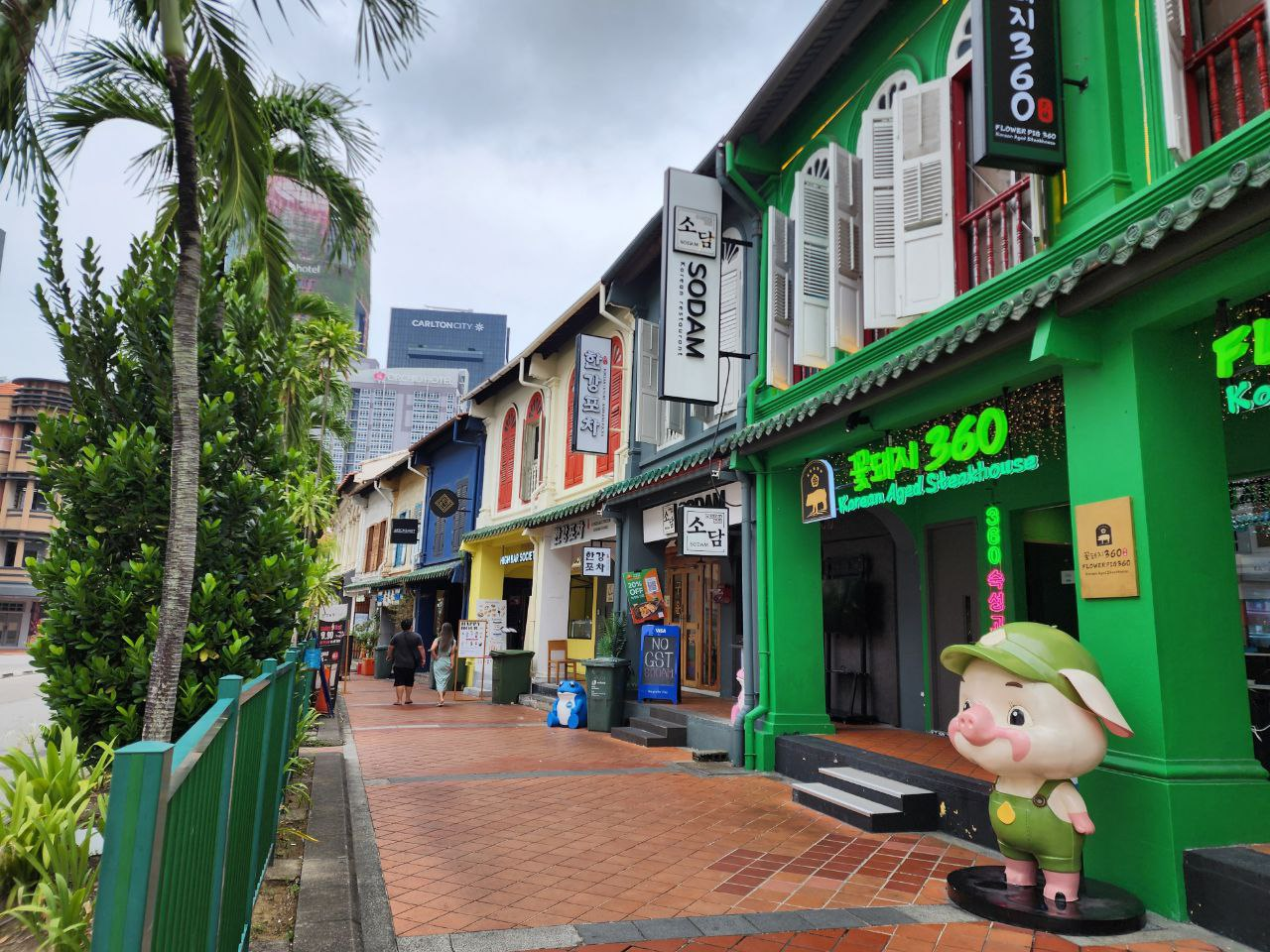
Korean establishments along Tanjong Pagar Road in the Central Region of Singapore

There are Koreatowns in the Upper Bukit Timah area and the Tanjong Pagar area, both within the Central Region of Singapore, due to the large number of Koreans living in these two areas. Following the increase in the Korean population, the number of restaurants and retailers aimed at the community is on the rise, with a majority of these establishments setting up in Tanjong Pagar. Koreans in Singapore formed a population of 21,203 individuals as of 2023, according to the South Korea's Ministry of Foreign Affairs and Trade.

==== Thailand ====
There is one Koreatown in Bangkok near Sukhumvit Soi 12 and one in Phuket. It consists mainly of North Korean refugees and South Korean expatriates, along with a number of South Korean immigrants who have naturalised as citizens of Thailand and their descendants.

==== Vietnam ====
Koreans in Vietnam is a community of Vietnam with a population of Korean migrants along with Vietnamese citizens of Korean ancestry. The population initially came in a military capacity, fighting on both sides of the Vietnam War. After the end of the war, there was little Korean migration or tourism in Vietnam, until the rise of the South Korean economy and the decline of the North resulted in an influx of South Korean investors and North Korean defectors, as well as South Korean men seeking Vietnamese wives. As of 2011, according to statistics of South Korea's Ministry of Foreign Affairs and Trade, they numbered roughly eighty thousand people, making them the second-largest Korean diaspora community in Southeast Asia, after the Korean community in the Philippines and the tenth-largest in the world. A more recent estimate from Vietnam Television says their population might be as large as 130,000.

=== Europe ===
==== United Kingdom ====
===== London =====
The south west London suburb of New Malden is home to the largest population of both South Koreans and North Koreans in Europe. One-third of New Malden residents are Korean and the town is a cultural hub for British Koreans. Korean businesses include two large supermarkets (H Mart and Korea Foods), several corner shops, cafés, karaoke bars, travel agents, hair dressers, butchers and over 20 restaurants.

=== Oceania ===
==== Australia and New Zealand ====
===== Sydney =====
Koreatown in the Sydney central business district is located around Pitt Street between Bathurst and Goulburn streets and Liverpool Street between George and Elizabeth streets. The area contains many retail businesses such as restaurants, grocers, travel agents, and bars on a block between Liverpool Street. Koreatown, along with the adjacent Thai Town, emerged in the early 21st century, decades after Chinatown was established nearby in 1980.

The eastern part of the town centre of Eastwood, in northern Sydney, is also officially promoted as "Koreatown". In 2023, the New South Wales government finance the campaign to "market the suburb's Rowe Street East as ‘Koreatown’".

Other concentrations of Korean shops and restaurants, exist around the secondary transport hub of Strathfield railway station, also sometimes referred to as "Little Korea", as well as in Campsie (said to be the first) which is home to the Sydney Korean Society. These areas feature a concentration of restaurants and shops catering to Korean cultural needs, as well as number of Korean-speaking businesses.

===== Melbourne =====
Melbourne's de facto Koreatown is concentrated around the vicinity of La Trobe Street, specifically Healeys Lane. It also now has a distinct pocket on Victoria Street, North Melbourne directly opposite the Queen Victoria Market.

In 2024, the city council voted to officially create the Korean district, and to erect a jangseung to mark the entrance of Koreantown.

== See also ==
- Japantown
- Little Saigon
- Little Manila
- Little India
- List of named ethnic enclaves in North American cities
- List of named ethnic enclaves in Philippine cities
