= Cul-de-sac conquest =

Card game

Cul-De-Sac Conquest
- Players: 2-8
- Setup time: >10 minutes
- Playing time: 30-60 minutes
- Chance: High
- Age range: 14+
- Skills: Strategy

Cul-De-Sac Conquest is a dedicated deck card game developed by Atheris Games where players choose a character and compete to annoy one another. The game was created by Andrew and Colby Birkett.

== Development ==
The game was funded through a successful Kickstarter campaign. The game was one of several products that got stranded at sea during the Hanjin bankruptcy.

== Reviews ==
- Board Game Geek
- All Us Geeks
- WUFT Gainesville
- SmarterBacker
