= Senator Lines =

- Formerly: DSR Senator Lines Holding GmbH (1994-2000)
- Industry: Shipping
- Predecessors: DSR-Lines GmbH; Senator Linie GmbH & Co. KG
- Founded: 1994; 31 years ago
- Defunct: 2009
- Fate: Ceased operations
- Headquarters: Bremen, Germany
- Parent: Hanjin Shipping (from 1997)

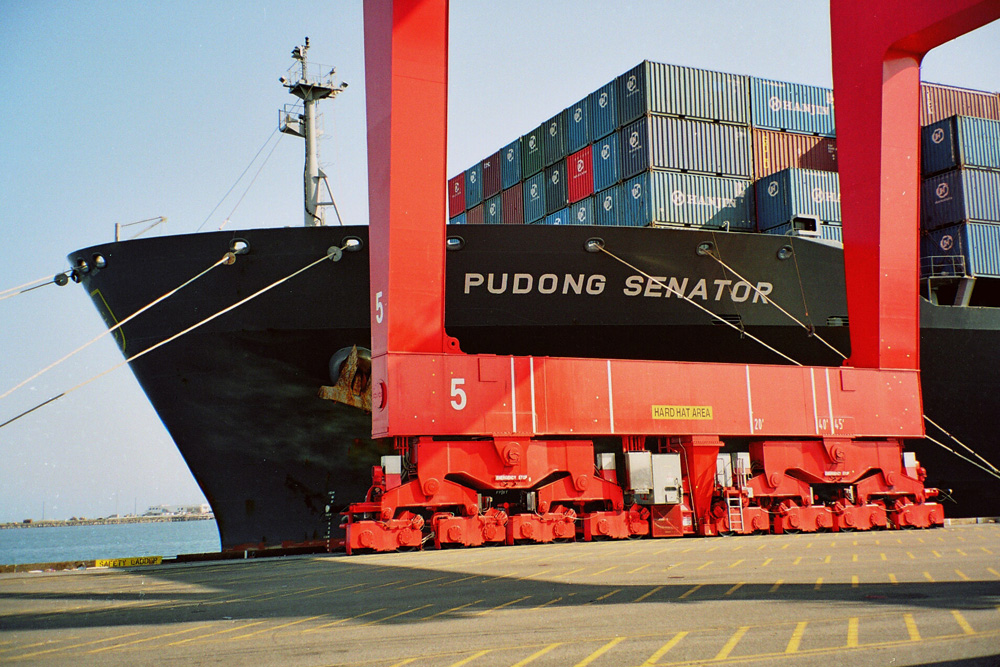
Bow of the "Pudong Senator" container ship

Senator Lines was a German based container transportation and shipping company headquartered in Bremen. The company was formed in 1994 with the merger of DSR-Lines GmbH (Rostock) and Senator Linie GmbH & Co. KG (Bremen).

== Company profile ==
DSR began in 1956 with service to Finland. Two years later it travelled to Egypt, following that with service to India in 1963. "Senator Linie" was founded in 1985 by Karl Heinz Sager ex CEO of Hapag lloyd and Hans Gerd Gielessen with a chartered fleet of small container ships sailing around the world eastbound and west bound. The company started operating as a subsidiary of Bremer Vulkan and began its operations in April 1987.

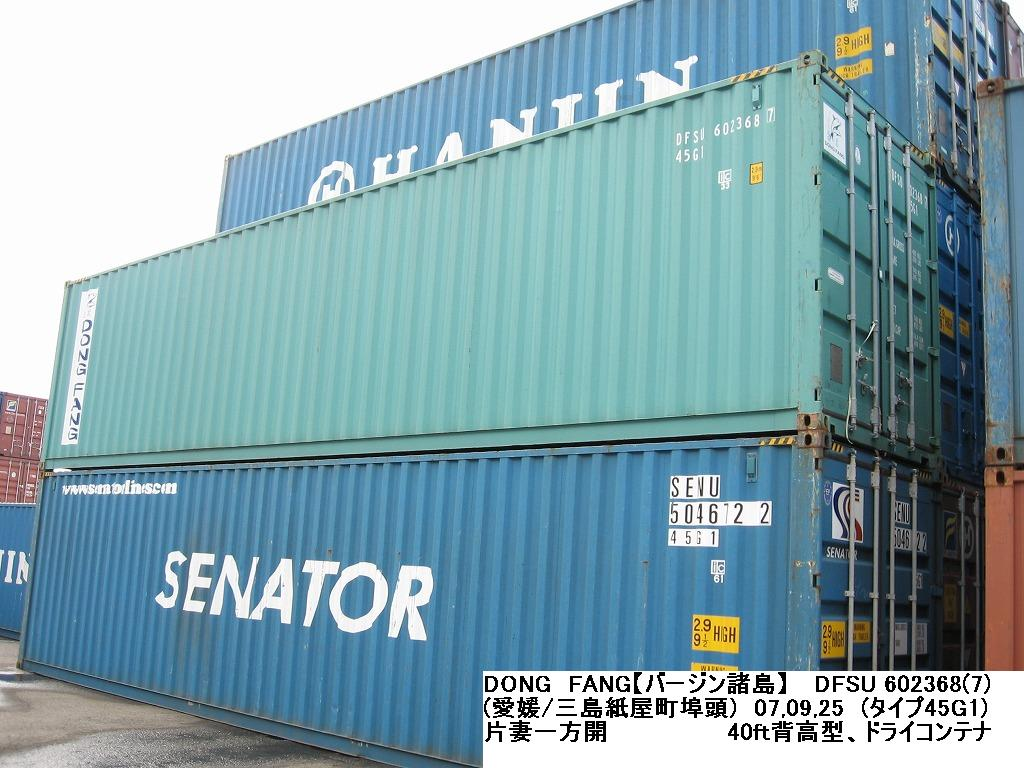
Senator Lines container

In 1987 a "Round the World Service" with 14-day departures was launched. After the German reunification, starting from January 1990, a cooperation with the East German liner shipping company DSR took place, from which the TRICON consortium emerged in June 1990 with the inclusion of the South Korean shipping company Cho Yang Line. The existing container liner services of the three shipping companies were coordinated and aligned. The cooperation between DSR and Senator resulted in 1994 in a merger of the two companies under the name DSR Senator Lines Holding GmbH, in which the German Seereederei Holding and Bremer Vulkan each held 50 percent of the shares. In the same year, the French company Maritime d'Affretement (CMA) and the Belgian CAST Container Line joined the TRICON consortium.

Three years later in 1997, DSR Senator was in financial difficulties, after which the South Korean shipping company Hanjin Shipping, already holding the majority share (80%) of the Senator Line took over (another 10% were each owned by the Bremen investment company BiG, and the Hamburg shipping company F. Laeisz). The TRICON "Round the World Service" concept was finally abandoned after the acquisition, and replaced by Pendulum services. In the year 2000 a name change to Senator Lines was decided and further strategic alliances evaluated.

== Operations merge ==
By combining its container fleet with Hanjin's, the newly created Hanjin-Senator became the seventh largest container shipping company in the world. Senator called on 250 ports in 64 countries all over the world, with a fleet of 113 container vessels. From 2004, the company increasingly focused on services between Europe and Asia. On the Northern Europe-Asia route, five services were operated in 2007 with 49 vessels with space capacities ranging from 4500 to 9500 TEU. Between the Mediterranean and Asia, 36 ships between 2200 and 5500 TEU were in operation. In addition, there were eight vessels with capacities ranging from 950 to 1500 TEU on the route between the Mediterranean and Montreal in Canada, six ships with an average of 2600 TEU were used between Europe and the ports of the South American East Coast and another four ships with an average of 1600 TEU drove on the Route between Northern Europe and the Mediterranean.

Hanjin-Senator announced that they would cease operations at end of February 2009.
