= Hanjin Sooho-class container ship =

Container ship class

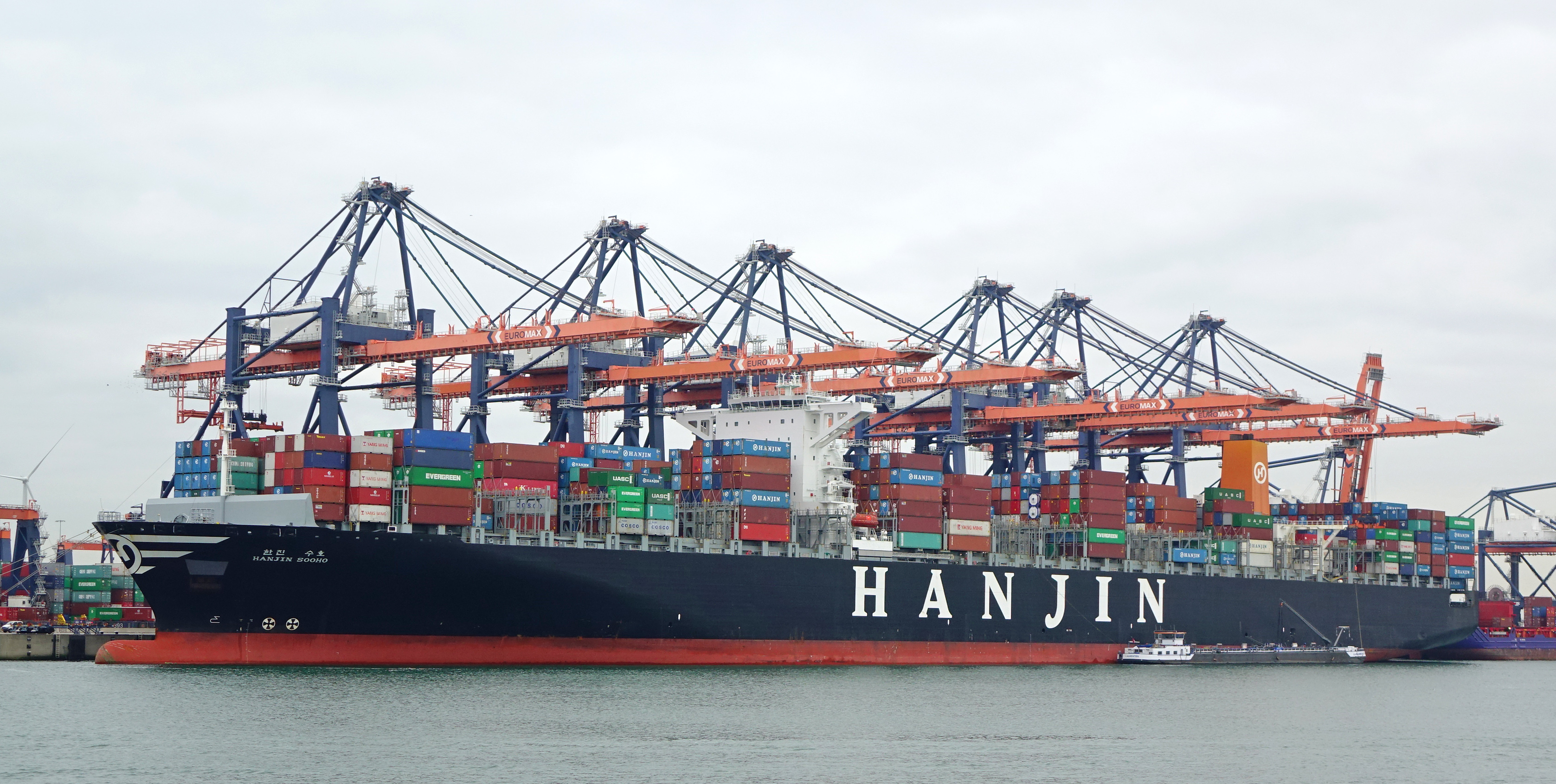
- Hanjin Sooho in the port of Rotterdam

Class overview
- Builders: Hyundai Heavy Industries
- Operators: Maersk Line; Mediterranean Shipping Company
- In service: 2012–present
- Planned: 9
- Completed: 9
- Active: 9

General characteristics
- Type: Container ship
- Tonnage: 140,973 GT
- Length: 366.5 m (1,202 ft)
- Beam: 48.3 m (158 ft)
- Draught: 15.5 m (51 ft)
- Capacity: 13,102 TEU

The Hanjin Sooho class is a series of 9 container ships built for the now defunct Hanjin Shipping. The ships were built by Hyundai Heavy Industries in South Korea. The ships have a maximum theoretical capacity of around 13,102 twenty-foot equivalent units (TEU).

Following the bankruptcy of Hanjin Shipping, the ships were auctioned off and are now operated by Maersk Line and Mediterranean Shipping Company.

== List of ships ==
Ship	Previous names	Yard number	IMO number	Delivery	Status	ref
Maersk Eureka	Hanjin Sooho (2012-2017)	2230	9501239	30 Mar 2012	In service	
Maersk Edirne	Hanjin Asia (2012-2017)	2231	9502867	13 Apr 2012	In service	
MSC Topaz	Hanjin Europe (2012-2017)	2232	9502908	4 May 2012	In service	
Maersk Emerald	Hanjin Africa (2012-2017)	2233	9502910	10 Aug 2012	In service	
Maersk Enshi	Hanjin America (2012-2017)	2234	9502946	7 Sep 2012	In service	
Maersk Ensenada	Hanjin Harmony (2013-2017)	2235	9502958	22 Mar 2013	In service	
MSC Ruby	Hanjin Gold (2013-2017)	2236	9502960	5 Apr 2013	In service	
MSC Perle	Hanjin Green Earth (2013-2017)	2238	9503732	12 Apr 2013	In service	
Maersk Esmeraldas	Hanjin Blue Ocean (2013-2017)	2237	9502972	3 May 2013	In service	
