= Healeys Lane =

Lane in Melbourne, Australia

Healeys Lane Healeys Alley Victoria
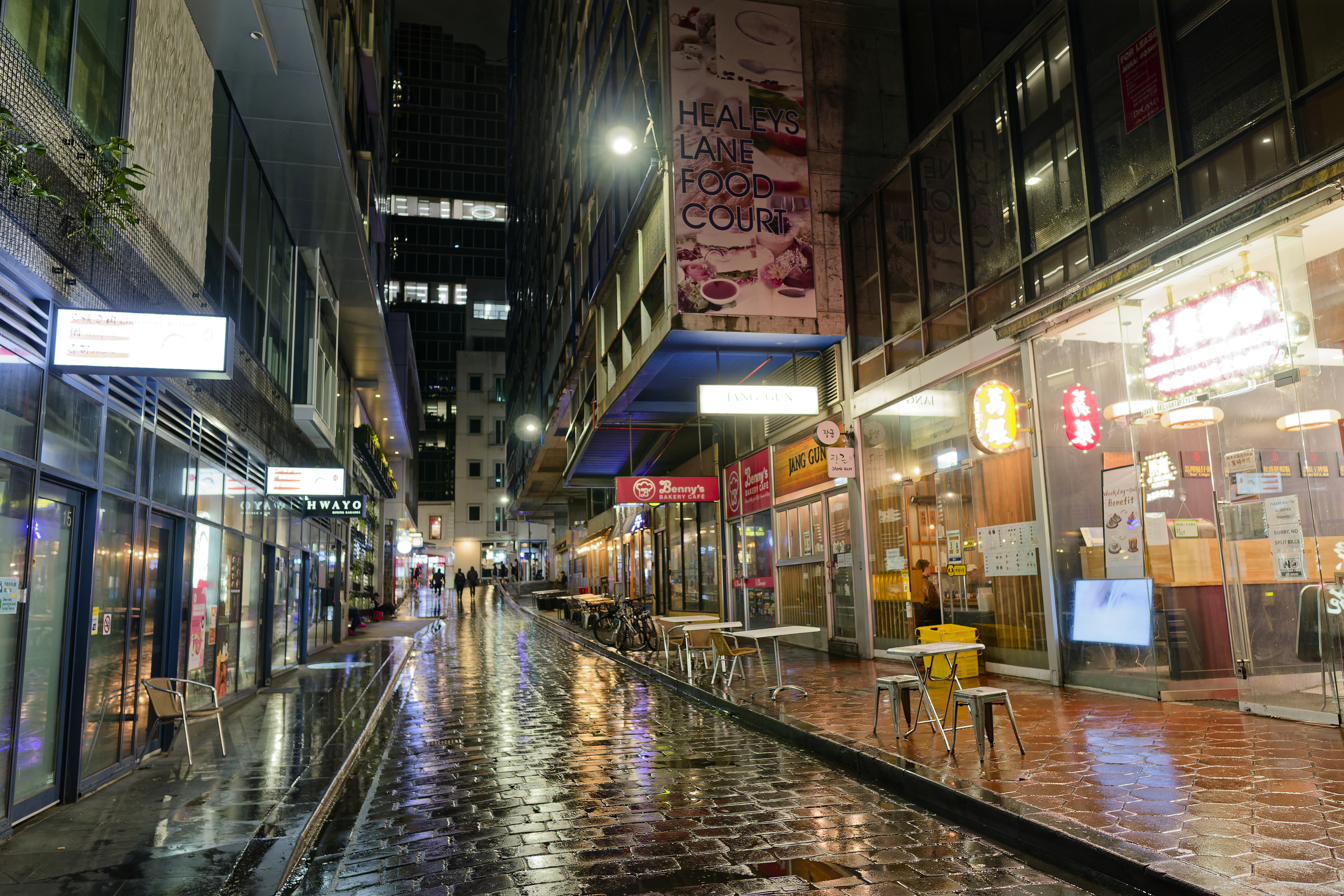
- Healeys Lane facing northward.
- Melbourne
- Coordinates: 37°48′48″S 144°57′21″E

General information
- Type: Street
- Location: Melbourne

Major junctions
- North end: Little Lonsdale Street
- South end: Lonsdale Street

Location(s)
- LGA(s): City of Melbourne

Healeys Lane is a cobblestone laneway in the central business district (CBD) of Melbourne, Victoria, Australia. Located on the CBD's northern edge between King Street and William Street, Healeys Lane runs north–south between Little Lonsdale Street and Lonsdale Street, close to Melbourne's legal precinct. Previously known as Healeys Alley prior to 1915, the lane was named in the 1860s after Martin Healey.

With at least 25 Korean businesses situated in the laneway or in its vicinity, Healeys Lane is known as the Koreatown of Melbourne, and is also informally referred to as "Kimchi Lane" and "Kimchi Street", with the lane attracting approximately 5000 patrons a day. Healeys Lane's designation as Melbourne's Koreatown was formalised in September 2024, with Future Melbourne Committee passing a unanimous vote on 3 September 2024 to ratify the Koreatown precinct and to approve the installation of four 3-metre tall jangseung (traditional Korean totem poles) at the entrances of the lane. The Consulate-General of the Republic of Korea in Melbourne will fund the production and installation of the jangseung, while the Melbourne City Council will cover the costs of project management and relevant approvals. In collaboration with the Melbourne Korean Business Association (MKBA), the consulate-general is aiming for an official opening ceremony for the precinct in the first half of 2025. Healeys Lane's designation as Melbourne's Koreatown sees it join Chinatown and the Greek Precinct as one of Melbourne's designated cultural precincts.

== See also ==
- Lanes and arcades of Melbourne
- Koreatown
