= Hanjin-Senator =

- Industry: Shipping
- Defunct: February 4, 2009
- Fate: Senator Lines ceased operations
- Parent: Hanjin Shipping; Senator Lines

Hanjin-Senator was achieved by combining the container fleets of Hanjin Shipping and Senator Lines, making Hanjin-Senator the eighth largest container shipping company in the world. Hanjin was Senator's majority shareholder; the two companies are run separately but combine their fleet numbers for statistical purposes.

The German subsidiary carrier Senator Lines announced on February 4, 2009 that they would be ceasing operations due to the economic downturn.

== See also ==
- Hanjin Shipping
- Senator Lines
