= Northwest Columbus (Ohio) =

- Neighborhood of Columbus, Ohio
- Interactive map of Northwest Columbus
- Coordinates: 39.98°N 83.01°W
- ZIP Code: 43235 & 43085 & 43214 & 43220 & 43017 & 43016
- Area code: 614

Northwest Columbus is a region in Franklin County, Ohio. It has about 45,000 residents, according to the 2010 U.S. census.

Northwest Columbus is bounded by the Scioto River on the west, the Olentangy River on the east, State Route 161 on the north, and Highland Drive and Henderson Road on the south.

The region includes parts of Perry Township, Sharon Township, the City of Dublin, and the City of Worthington.

== History ==
Northwest Columbus was originally defined as the area bounded by Kenny Road on the east, Dierker Road on the west, Bethel Road on the north, and Old Henderson Road on the south. It was later expanded to the boundaries of the Olentangy River on the east, the Scioto River on the west, State Route 161 on the north, and the border of Upper Arlington/Highland Drive on the south.

Northwest Columbus now includes parts of Perry and Sharon Townships, Dublin, and Worthington. In 2007, the boundaries were changed to include only property within the City of Columbus.

Northwest Columbus used to be mainly farm land. However, since the development of the automobile, they have evolved into suburbs. The area has now includes housing developments, commercial and entertainment sites, schools, and medical facilities.

== Neighborhoods ==
=== Sharon Township ===
In 1796, the area now known as Sharon Township was part of the U.S. Military District. It was originally called Liberty Township and extended into Delaware County. On March 4, 1806, its name was changed to Sharon Township. The Township was officially established with its current boundaries on March 4, 1816. Today, Sharon is bounded on the north by Delaware County, on the east by Blendon Township, on the south by Clinton Township and on the west by Perry Township.

=== Perry Township ===
Perry Township, formed in the early 1800s, was named after Commodore Oliver Hazard Perry. Perry is surrounded by Columbus, Upper Arlington, Dublin and Worthington.

=== Northcrest ===
Northcrest is bounded by Bethel Road on the north, Reed Road on the east, Woodrun Boulevard on the west, and West Henderson Road on the south.

Northcrest is served by the Columbus City School District, the Dublin City School District, and the Upper Arlington City School District.

=== Linworth ===
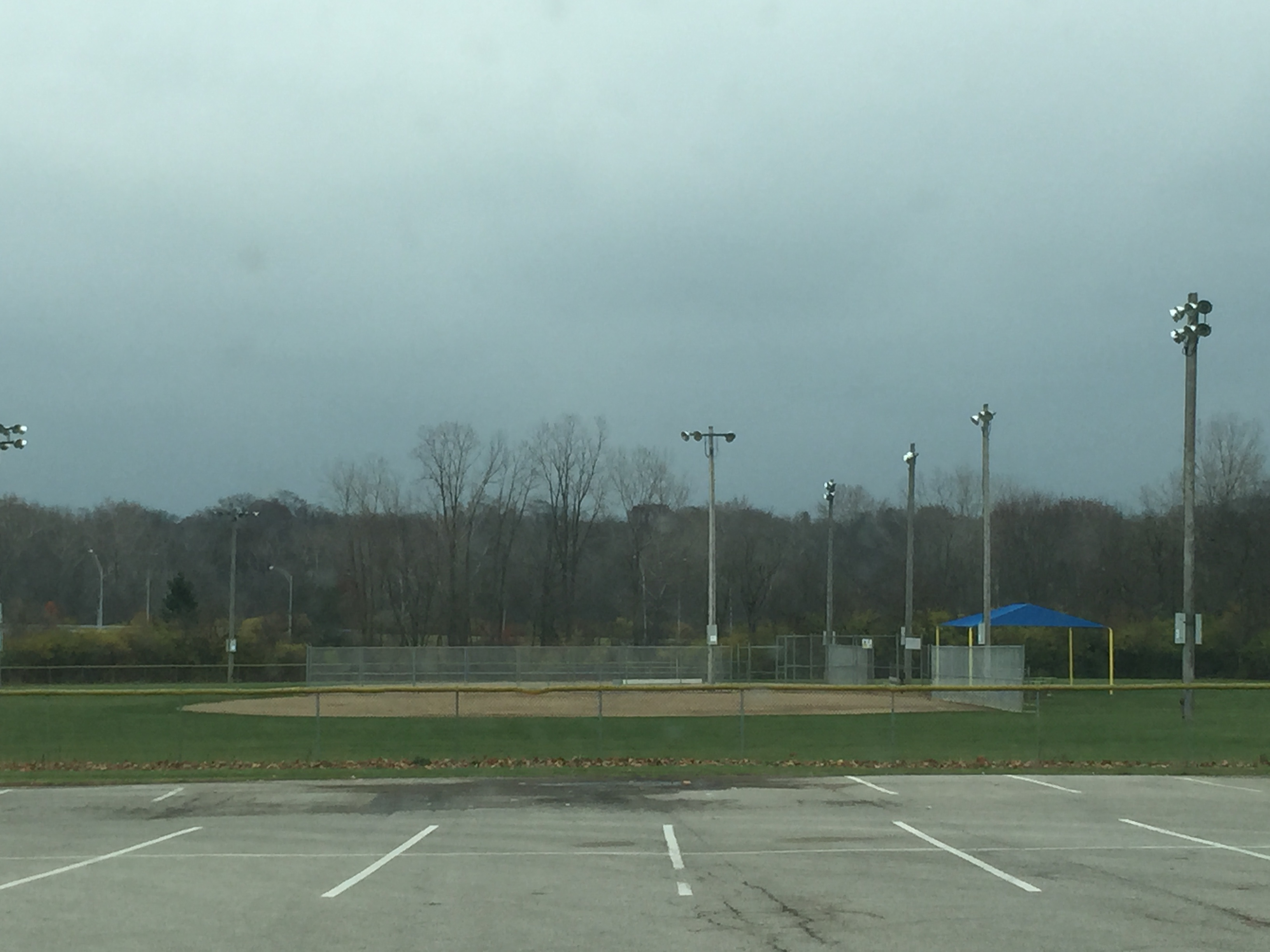
Anheuser-Busch Softball Fields

Linworth is located at the intersection of State Route 161 and Linworth Road It is bordered on the west by Brookside Estates and the Ohio State University Airport, and on the east by State Route 315. The area derived its name from Dublin and Worthington.

=== Olentangy Commons ===
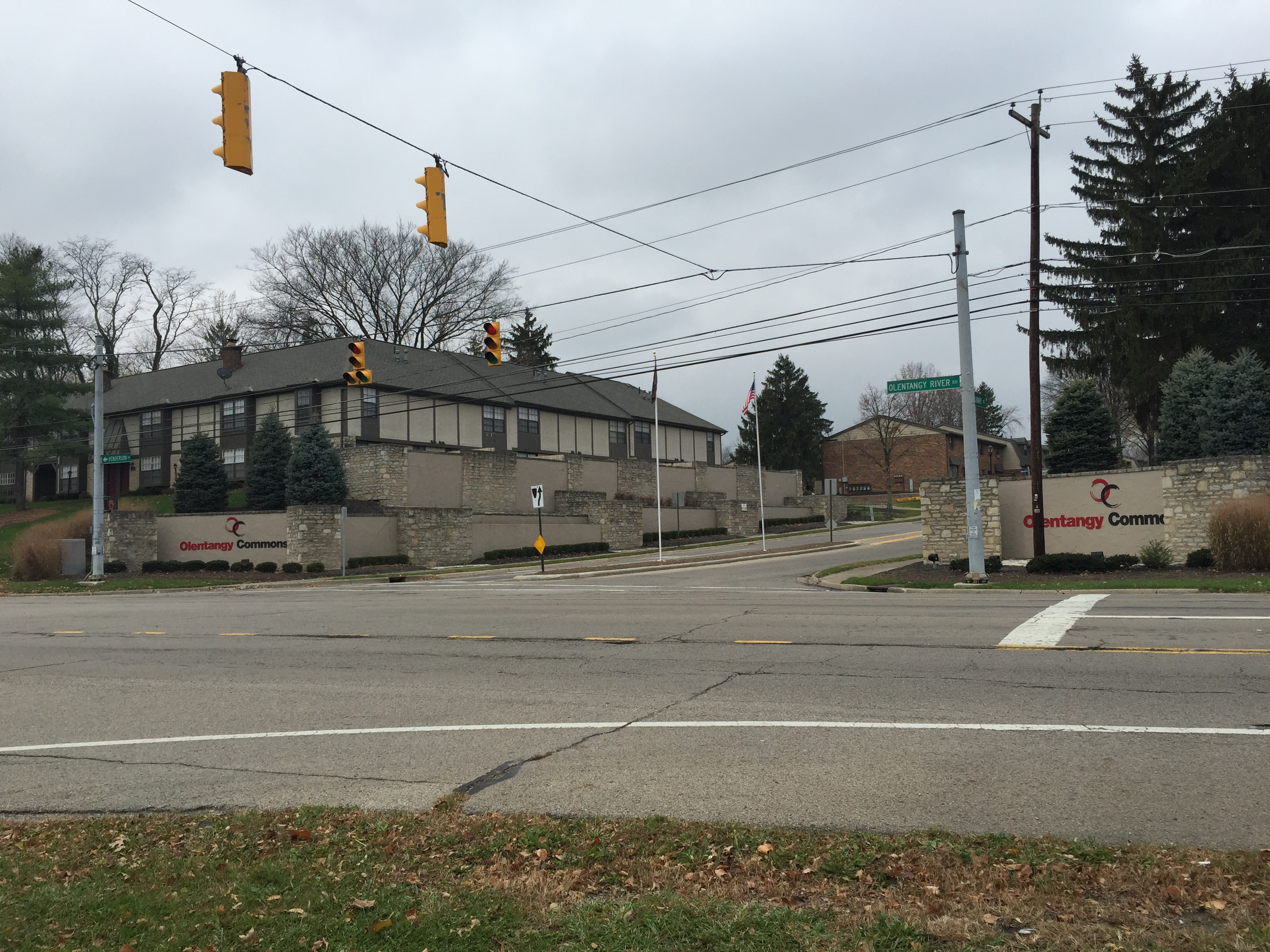
Olentangy Commons

Olentangy Commons is located in the Olentangy River Rd/W Henderson Rd area. It provides off-campus housing to many Ohio State University (OSU) students.

=== Governor's Square ===
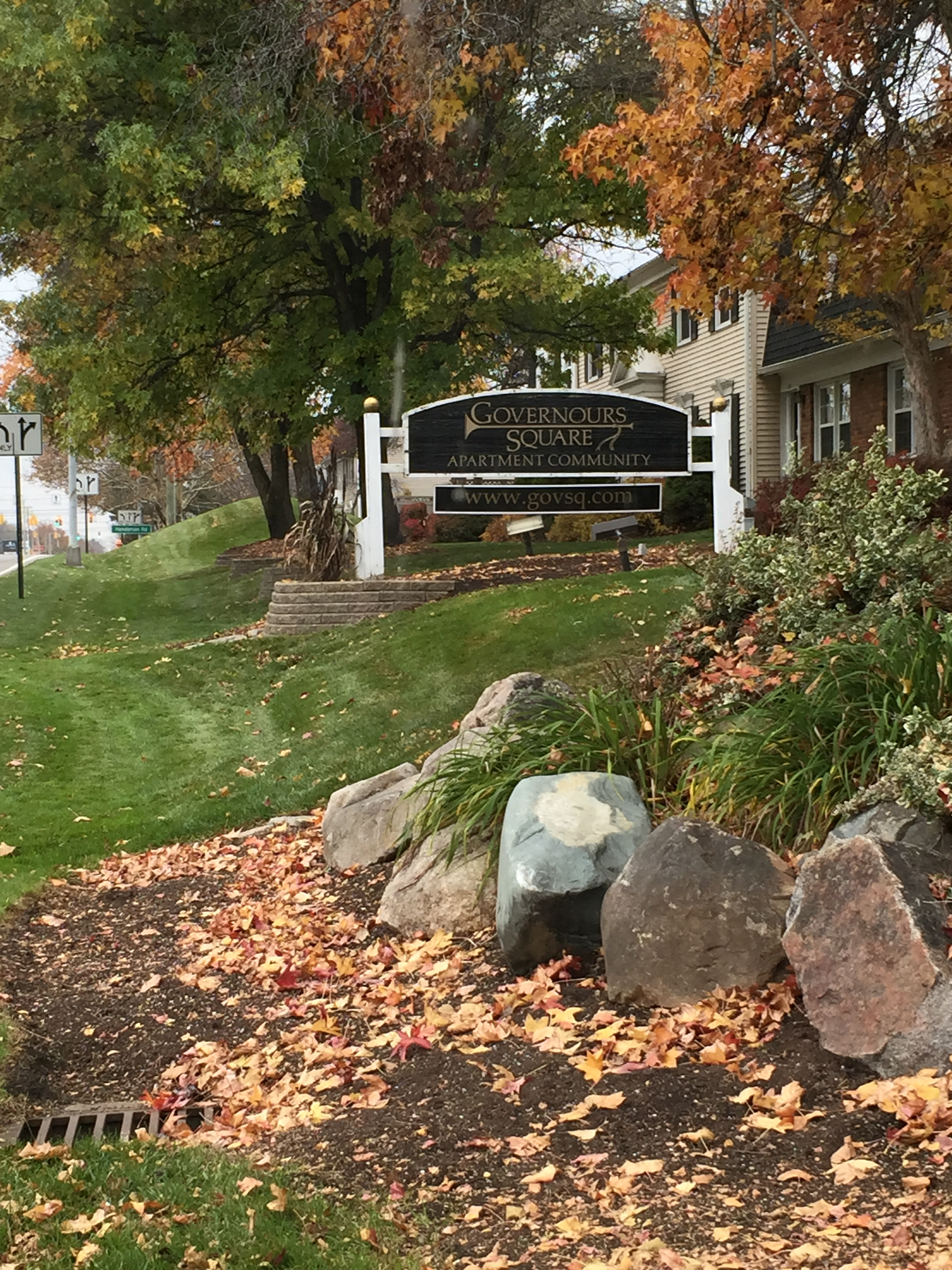
Governor's Square

Governor's Square is located in the Kenny Rd/W Henderson Rd area. Almost half of the units are occupied by single people/one person.

== Transportation ==
The Central Ohio Transit Authority (COTA) has multiple lines in Northwest Columbus. Walking paths and bike lanes are newer additions to the region. It is close to the Olentangy Trail.

== Structures and landmarks ==
The Ohio State University Airport is located in Northwest Columbus It contributes over $157 million in direct and indirect benefits to Central Ohio each year.

== Entertainment ==
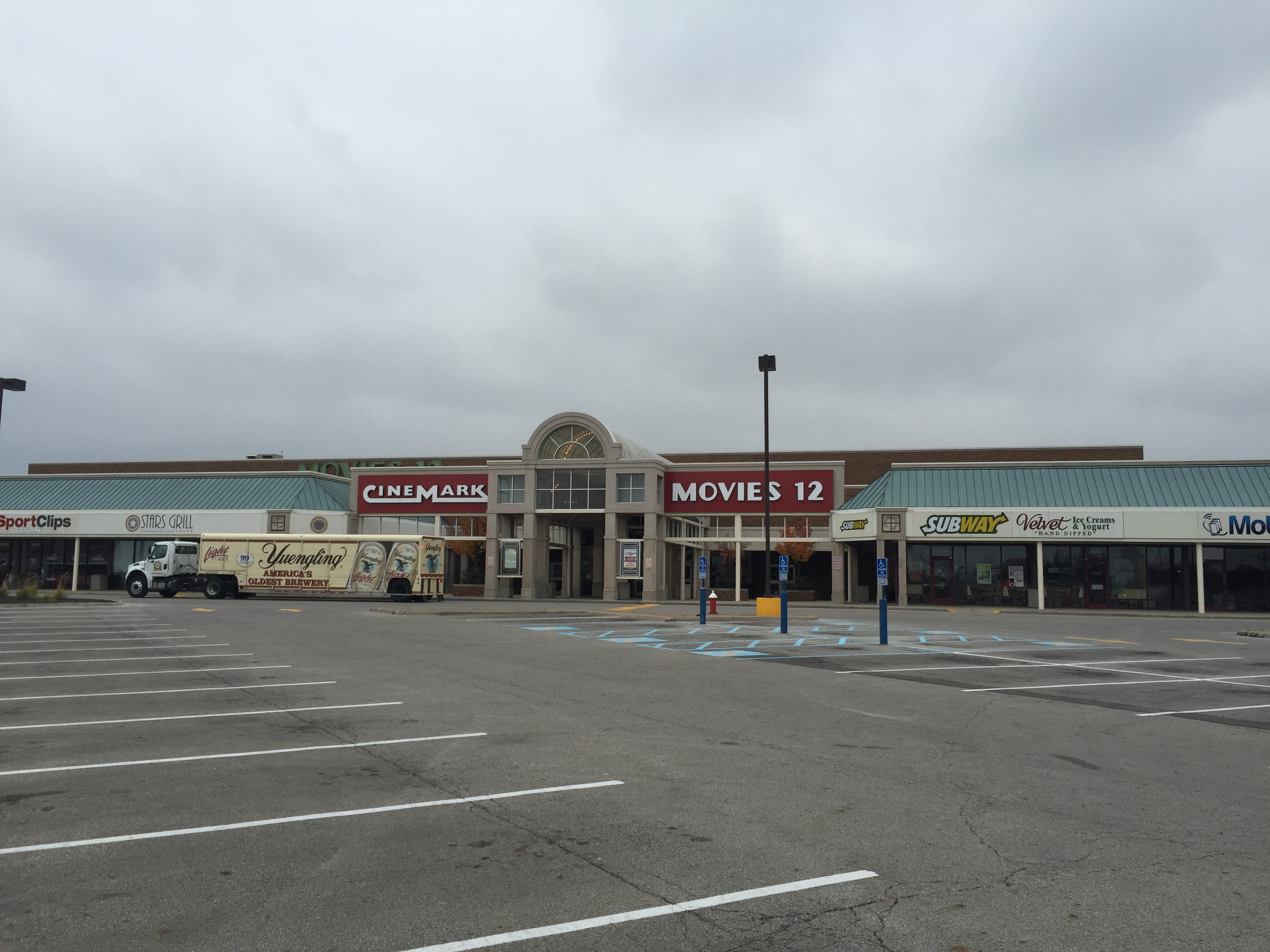
Cinemark Carriage Place Dollar Theater

Entertainment in Northwest Columbus includes Cinemark Dollar Theater, Buckeye Entertainment, and Sawmill Lanes Bowling Alley.

== Parks ==
- Antrim Park
- Godown Road Dog Park
- Riverside Green Park
- Carriage Place Recreation Center
- Northcrest Park
- Anheuser Busch Sports Park
- Olentangy Park
- Shaker Square Park
- Sycamore Hills Park

== Education ==
- Ridgeview Middle School
- Centennial High School
- Winterset Elementary School,
- Gables Elementary School,
- Wright Elementary School.
