= Hanjin Shipping =

Defunct South Korean logistics company

Hanjin Shipping Co. Ltd

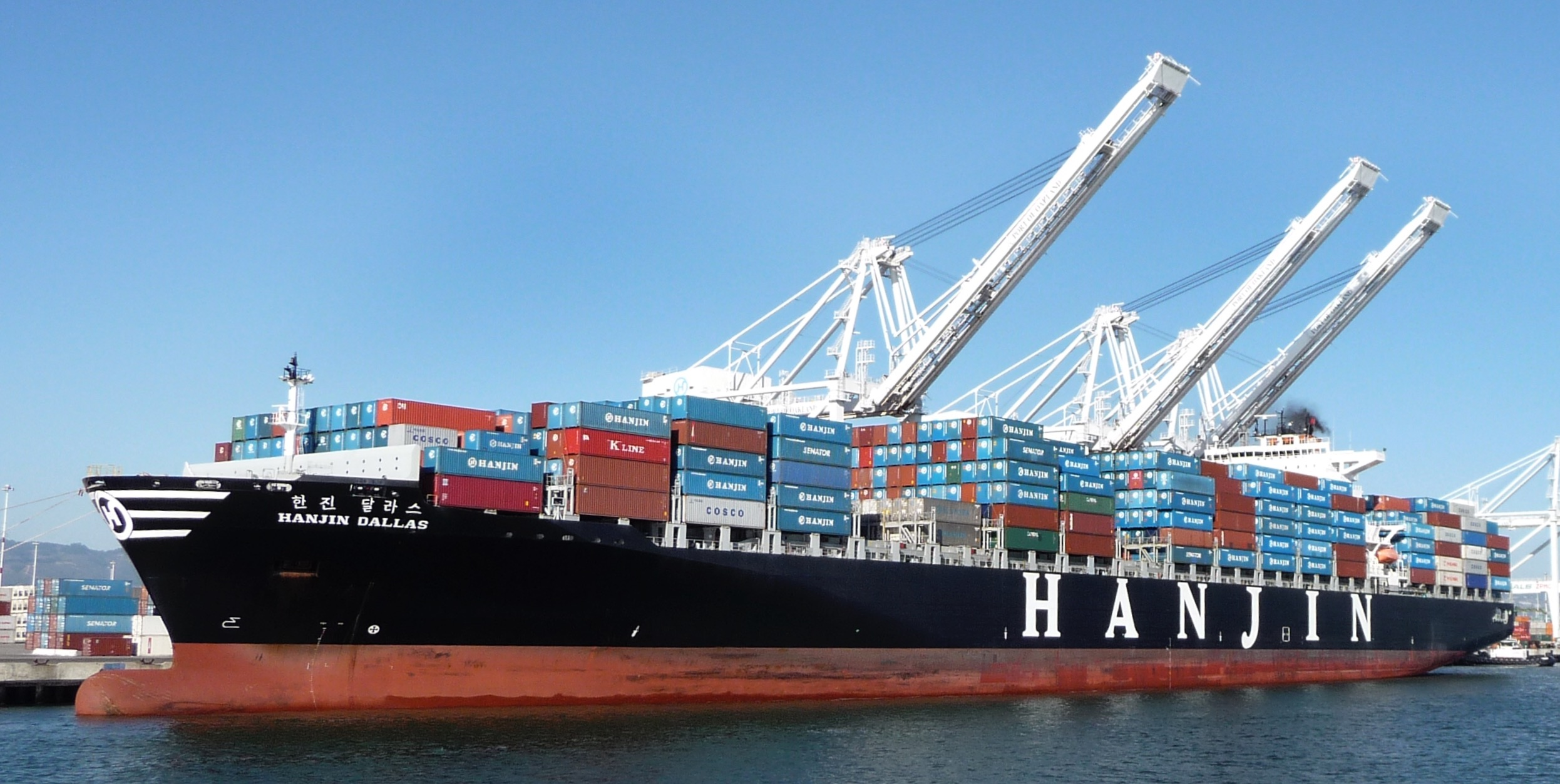
- Trade name: Hanjin Shipping
- Native name: 한진해운
- Industry: Containerization, shipping, ocean freight transport
- Founded: 16 May 1977
- Defunct: 17 February 2017
- Fate: Bankruptcy & Liquidation
- Successor: Kumarasinghe Shipping
- Headquarters: South Korea
- Services: Cargo transport, container terminal management
- Owner: Hanjin
- Parent: Korean Air (43.26%)
- Website: hanjin.com

Hanjin Shipping Co., Ltd. was a South Korean logistics and container transport company. Hanjin Shipping was South Korea's largest container line and one of the world's top ten container carriers in terms of capacity.

Hanjin was declared bankrupt by South Korean courts on 17 February 2017.

== History ==
Cho Choong Hoon founded the company in November 1945 with a single truck in the port city of Inchon. It provided the U.S. Army with the transportation of material to both Korea and Vietnam. The company signed a major contract with the US 8th Army in November 1956, and another contract in March 1966, with all of the U.S. armed forces in Vietnam, including the Army, Navy, and Air Force. In November 1969, Hanjin made its entry into the containerized shipping business signing a deal with Sea-Land Service, Inc. In September 1970, the company opened its first container yard at the port of Busan.

The late 1970s saw a major push into the Middle East with contracts signed to Kuwait at the port of Shuwaik (September 1977), Saudi Arabia at the port of Dammam (March 1979), and at the port of Jeddah (May 1980). In August 1992, the company started to load and unload cargo at the ports of Long Beach and Seattle with the joint venture Total Terminals International LLC.

After Hanjin's founder, Cho Choong-hoon, died in 2002, his eldest son, Cho Yang-ho, inherited Korean Air (KAL), when his third son, Cho Soo-ho, was handed Hanjin Shipping. Cho Soo-ho died from lung cancer in 2006 and his widow, Choi Eun-young, became the chairwoman of Hanjin Shipping in the following year.

Before the Great Recession, global container shipping rates were rising. Hanjin placed orders for 250,000 TEU of new ships from 2008 onwards. However, less than two months after placing the new ship orders, the Great Recession started. Hanjin reduced its ship orders, but still had seven ships delivered in the period 2010–2013 which doubled company debt to $8Bn.

In June 2014, in order to bring additional liquidity to the business, KAL acquired 33.2 percent of Hanjin Shipping. By August 2016, the company owned only 44 per cent of the container fleet in operation, and the rest was chartered-in. Container shipping rates continued to fall which resulted in financial losses.

In April 2016, Hanjin applied to its creditors for debt restructuring, in order to avoid formal insolvency proceedings. Hanjin Shipping's creditors withdrew their support after deeming a funding plan by parent company Hanjin inadequate.

On 31 August 2016, Hanjin filed for receivership at the Seoul Central District Court and requested the court to freeze its assets, after losing support from its banks the previous day. After Hanjin's receivership was publicized, creditors confiscated assets and Hanjin vessels experienced access issues in ports globally because service providers were not informed if and how they would be paid to load and unload Hanjin vessels.

On 2 September 2016, Hanjin Shipping filed papers in U.S. Bankruptcy court in Newark that allowed its vessels to dock without getting confiscated by creditors.

On 17 February 2017, Hanjin Shipping Co. was declared bankrupt by South Korean courts.

In February 2017, SM Line, a new shipping firm formed by Samra Midas (SM) Group, purchased five vessels previously owned by Hanjin. In March, SM Line acquired two of Hanjin Shipping's terminals in Korea, in the cities of Gwangyang and Incheon.

In August 2017, a South Korean bankruptcy trustee which was appointed to manage the liquidation of Hanjin Shipping reported that it had only collected 220 million USD from the sale of Hanjin's assets. This sum amounts to only 2% of the US$10.5 billion total debt Hanjin owes to its creditors.

== Legacy ==
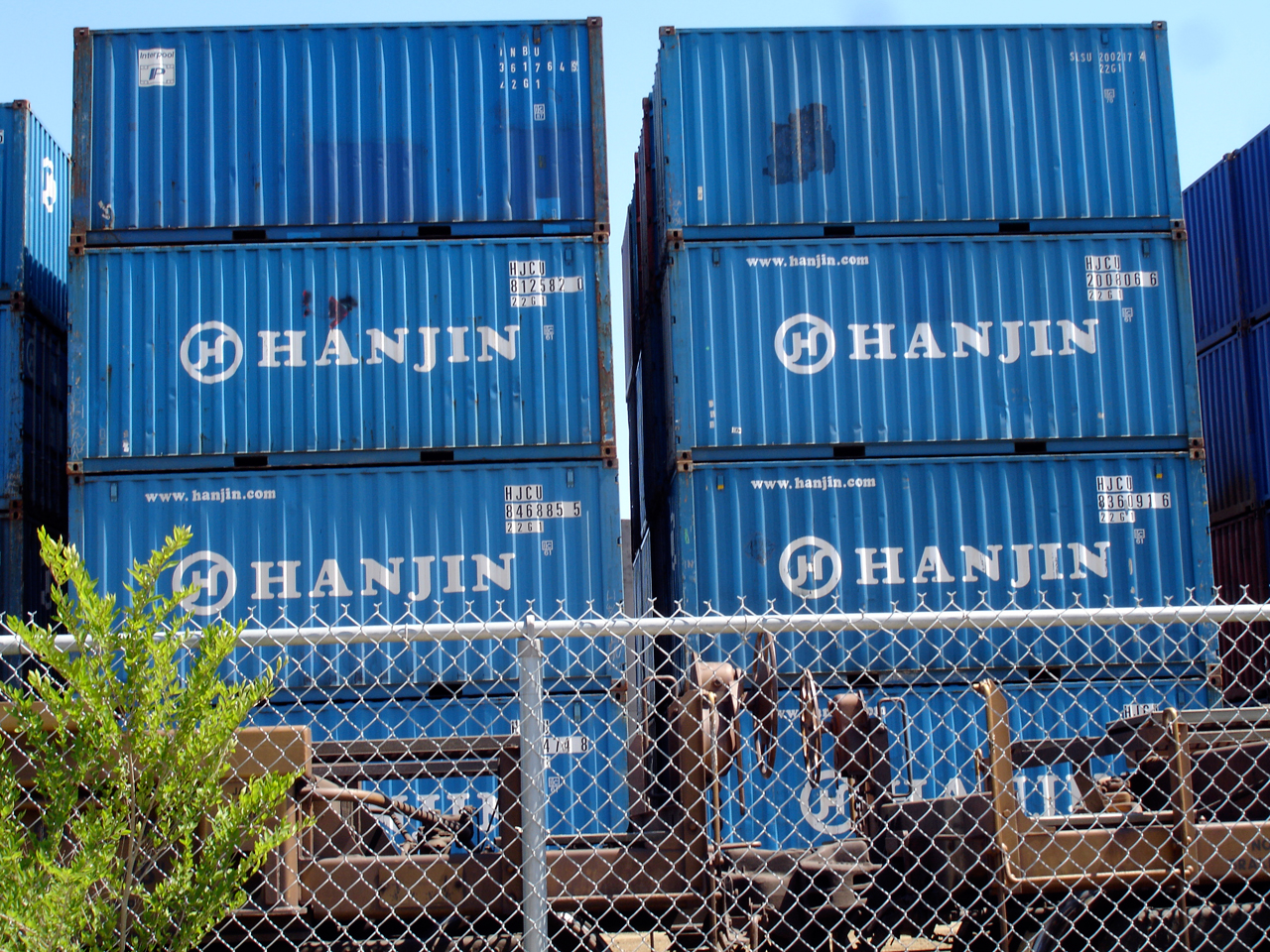
Hanjin 20 foot containers

Hanjin Shipping was the largest bankruptcy in the container transport industry and it caused worldwide supply chain and shipping disruption as cargo ships were left stuck at ports and canals waiting for cash payments. Hanjin's bankruptcy created a massive ripple effect. Other businesses that rely on physical products found themselves without the expected revenue from inventory that became stuck at sea. The containers of other container ship companies also became stranded on Hanjin vessels. Hanjin collapsed at an especially inconvenient time for retailers furnishing their inventories with imported items in preparation for a seasonal uptick in Thanksgiving, Christmas, Black Friday, and New Year's sales. Although large companies such as Nike were affected, the repercussions were more prominent on smaller companies.

== Operations ==
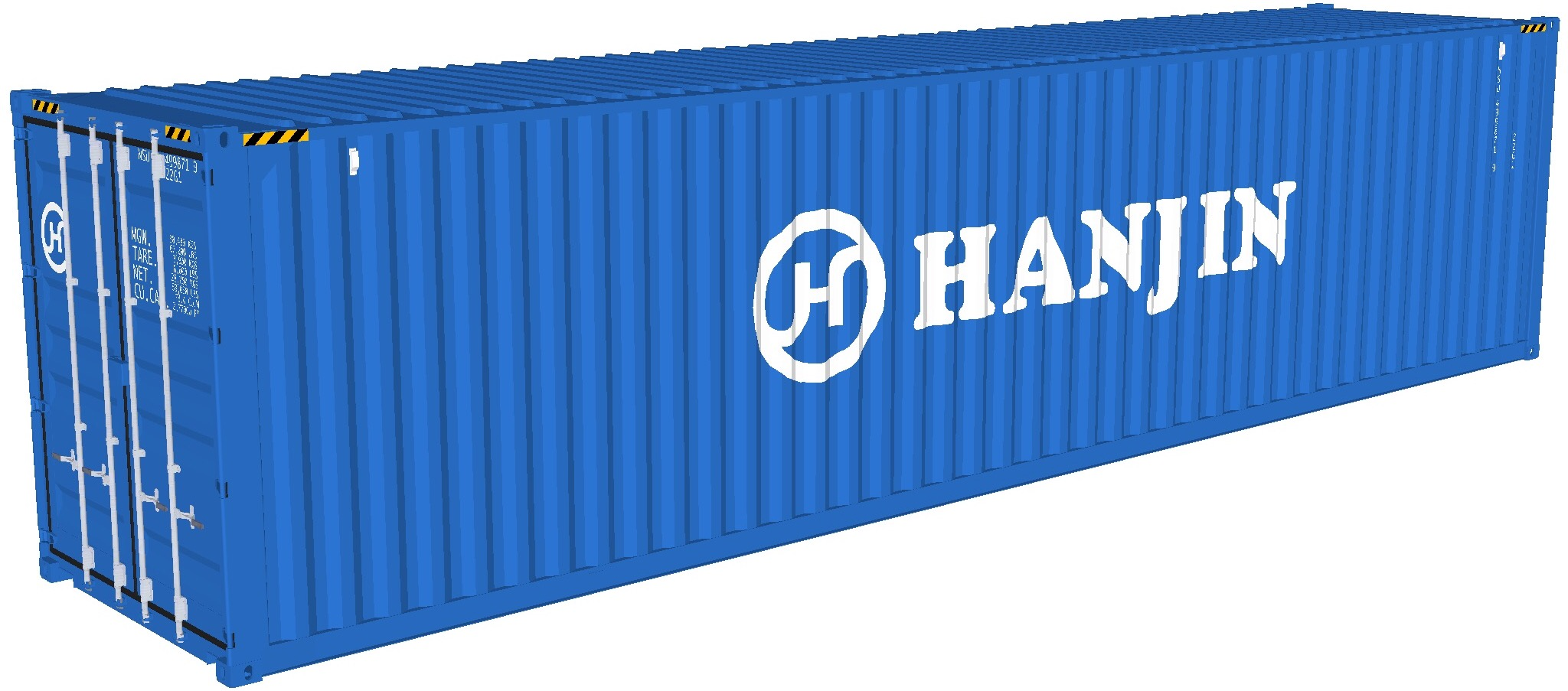
Hanjin container

Hanjin shipping formerly operated some 60 liner and tramper services around the globe, transporting over 100 million tons of cargo annually. Its fleet consisted of many container ships, bulk and LNG carriers. Hanjin Shipping had its own subsidiaries dedicated to ocean transportation and terminal operation and it had several branch offices in various countries. Hanjin-Senator once was the seventh largest container transportation and shipping company in the world (operations ceased February 2009).

=== Services ===
- Container – Transported approximately 3.7 million TEU containers a year. This service consisted of 24 container ships which allowed for this service to produce such an output per year. In 2010 Hanjin was the first to introduce a 10,000 TEU class carrier ship, which travelled between Asia and Europe.
- Bulk - This division of the shipping company delivered a variety of resources and raw materials through its ‘contract of affreightment’ with other companies. The division's ships were LNG and VLCC ships which carried crude oil and chemicals.
- Terminal – The shipping terminals for this company were distributed internationally. There were fourteen [sic] dock yards that this company owned: four in Korea, three in the United States of America, two in Japan, and one each in Spain, Taiwan, Vietnam and Belgium.

=== Fleet ===
Container ship classes of Hanjin Shipping
Ship class	Built	Capacity (TEU)	Ships in class	Notes
Sooho-class	2012–2013	13,102	9	

== See also ==
- Top container shipping companies
- HMM (company)
- EUKOR
- Hyundai Glovis
