= Korean Americans =

Americans of Korean ancestry

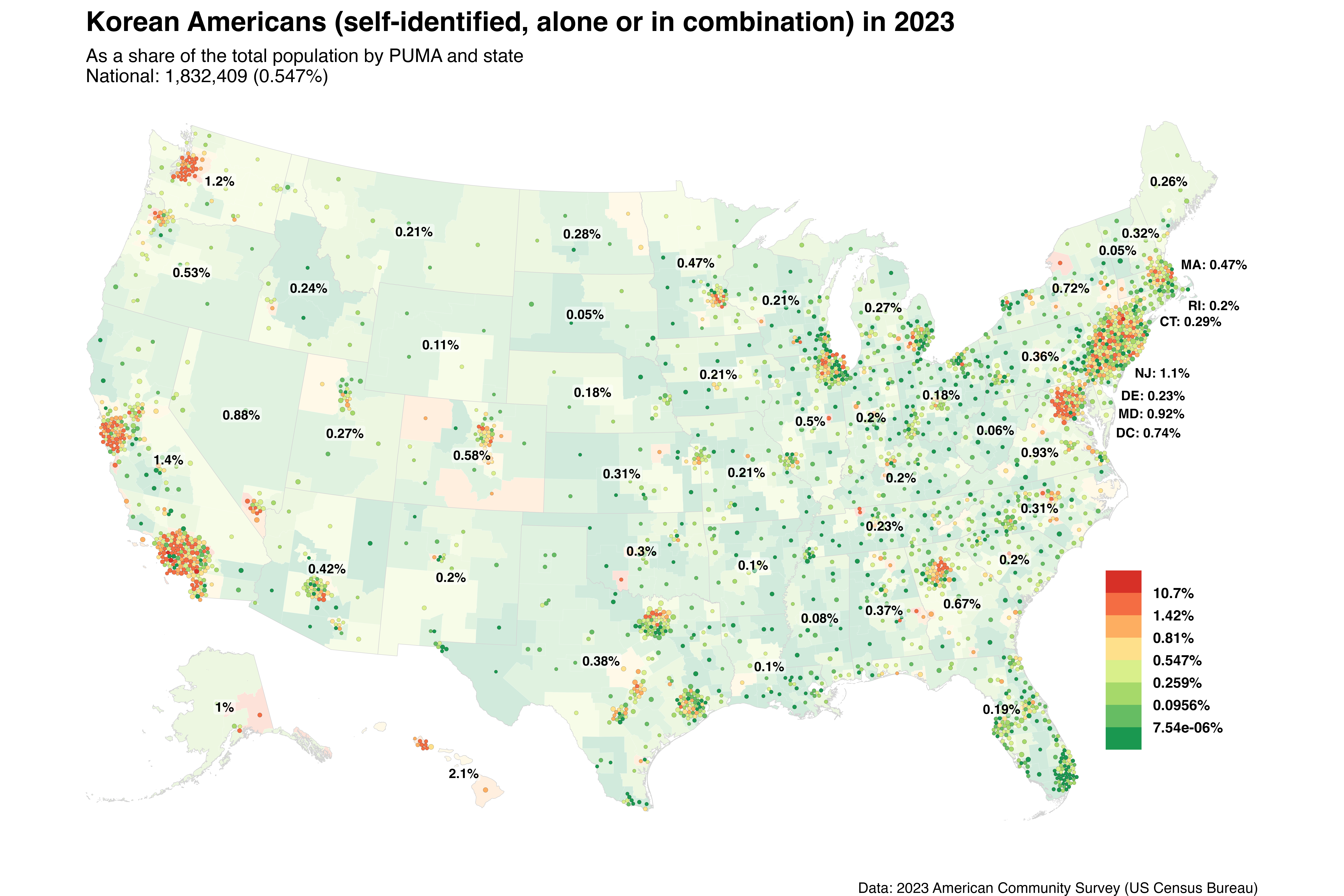

Total population
- 2,023,517 (2023) (ancestry or ethnic origin); 1,017,250 (2023) (born in Korea)

Regions with significant populations
- Los Angeles metropolitan area; New York metropolitan area; Baltimore–Washington metropolitan area; San Francisco Bay Area; Denver metropolitan area; Seattle metropolitan area; Minneapolis–Saint Paul; St. Louis metropolitan area; Kansas City metropolitan area; Philadelphia metropolitan area; Boston metropolitan area; Chicago metropolitan area; Milwaukee metropolitan area; Atlanta metropolitan area; Miami metropolitan area; Greater Orlando; Pensacola metropolitan area; New Orleans metropolitan area; Houston metropolitan area; Anchorage, Alaska; Portland metropolitan area; Dallas–Fort Worth metropolitan area; Riverside, California

Languages
- American English, Korean

Religion
- 61% Protestantism; 23% Unaffiliated; 10% Roman Catholicism; 6% Buddhism

- Korean Americans
- Hangul: 한국계 미국인
- Hanja: 韓國系美國人
- RR: Hangukgye Migugin
- MR: Han'gukkye Migugin

Koreans in America
- Hangul: 미주 한인
- Hanja: 美洲韓人
- RR: Miju Hanin
- MR: Miju Hanin

Korean Americans (Korean: 한국계 미국인) are Americans who have full or partial Korean ethnic ancestry. While the broader term Overseas Korean in America (미주한인/재미교포/재미한인) may refer to all ethnic Koreans residing in the United States, the specific designation of Korean American implies the holding of American citizenship.

As of 2022, there are 1.5–1.8 million Americans of Korean descent, of whom roughly 1.04 million were born abroad, accounting for 8% of all Asian Americans and 0.5% of the total U.S. population. However, prominent scholars and Korean associations claim that the Korean American population exceeds 2.5–3 million, which would make it the largest community of Overseas Koreans in the world, ahead of China's 2.1 million.

Nearly the entire population of Korean Americans traces its ancestry to South Korea (Republic of Korea), with North Korea (Democratic People's Republic of Korea) accounting for a negligible number. An estimated 20,000 second generation Korean Americans are "dual citizens by birth" of South Korea and the United States of America (선천적 한미 복수국적자).

In contrast to Northeast Asia, which is grappling with significantly low birth rates, the number of Korean Americans with both parents from Korea is growing by 5.9%. Moreover, the population of those with mixed heritage is increasing at a rate of 16.5%.

== Background ==
As of 2023, Korean Americans made up about 0.6% of the U.S. population, numbering approximately 2 million people. They are the fifth-largest subgroup within the Asian American community, following Chinese Americans, Filipino Americans, Indian Americans, and Vietnamese Americans.

The United States is the residence of the world's most extensive Korean diasporas, largely from South Korea. As of 2006, due to historical diplomatic challenges stemming from the Korean War in the 1950s, the number of North Korean defectors to the United States has remained below 220, constituting a negligible 0.008352 percent of the total Korean American demographic. Thus, it is evident that an overwhelming majority, approximately 99.991648 percent, of the Korean American population traces its roots to South Korea. The Republic of Korea is acknowledged as a principal ally of the United States, fostering a relationship built on intertwined economic interests, and strategic security cooperation.

According to the Ministry of Foreign Affairs of South Korea, as of 2021, the population of Overseas Koreans residing in the United States was 2,633,777. This figure includes both U.S. citizens of Korean descent and South Korean nationals living in the U.S. Specifically, there were 1,529,855 U.S. citizens of Korean descent and 1,103,922 South Korean nationals. By 2021, the U.S. Census Bureau reported the number of Korean Americans as 1,469,854, considering only those who identified with a single race. Notably, about 1,011,589 of these individuals were born in Korea. The population has remained relatively stable into 2023, with the Overseas Koreans Foundation reporting a figure of 2,615,419.

== Demographics ==
Historical population
Year	Pop.	±%
1910	462	—
1920	1,224	+164.9%
1930	1,860	+52.0%
1940	1,711	−8.0%
1970	69,130	+3940.3%
1980	354,593	+412.9%
1990	798,849	+125.3%
2000	1,076,872	+34.8%
2010	1,423,784	+32.2%
2020	1,508,575	+6.0%

As of 2023, the United States, which is home to the largest population of overseas Koreans, has the following distribution of Korean Americans.

- California: 558,338
- New York: 141,745
- Texas: 115,107
- New Jersey: 113,736
- Virginia: 94,275
- Washington (state): 92,798
- Illinois: 81,340
- Georgia: 75,525
- Maryland: 48,468
- Other states: 509,870

In 2023, the proportion of Korean Americans in the population varies significantly across the United States. The highest proportion is in Hawaii, accounting for 3.87% of the state's total population. California follows with 1.43%, hosting a large Korean American community; this is notably high considering the overall Korean ethnicity ratio of 0.59% in the U.S. Washington State (1.28%), New Jersey (1.19%), and Virginia (1.09%) also have relatively large Korean American communities. Maryland's proportion is 0.97%, and Alaska's is 0.95%. Nevada has 0.72%, New York City 0.71%, and Georgia 0.69%.

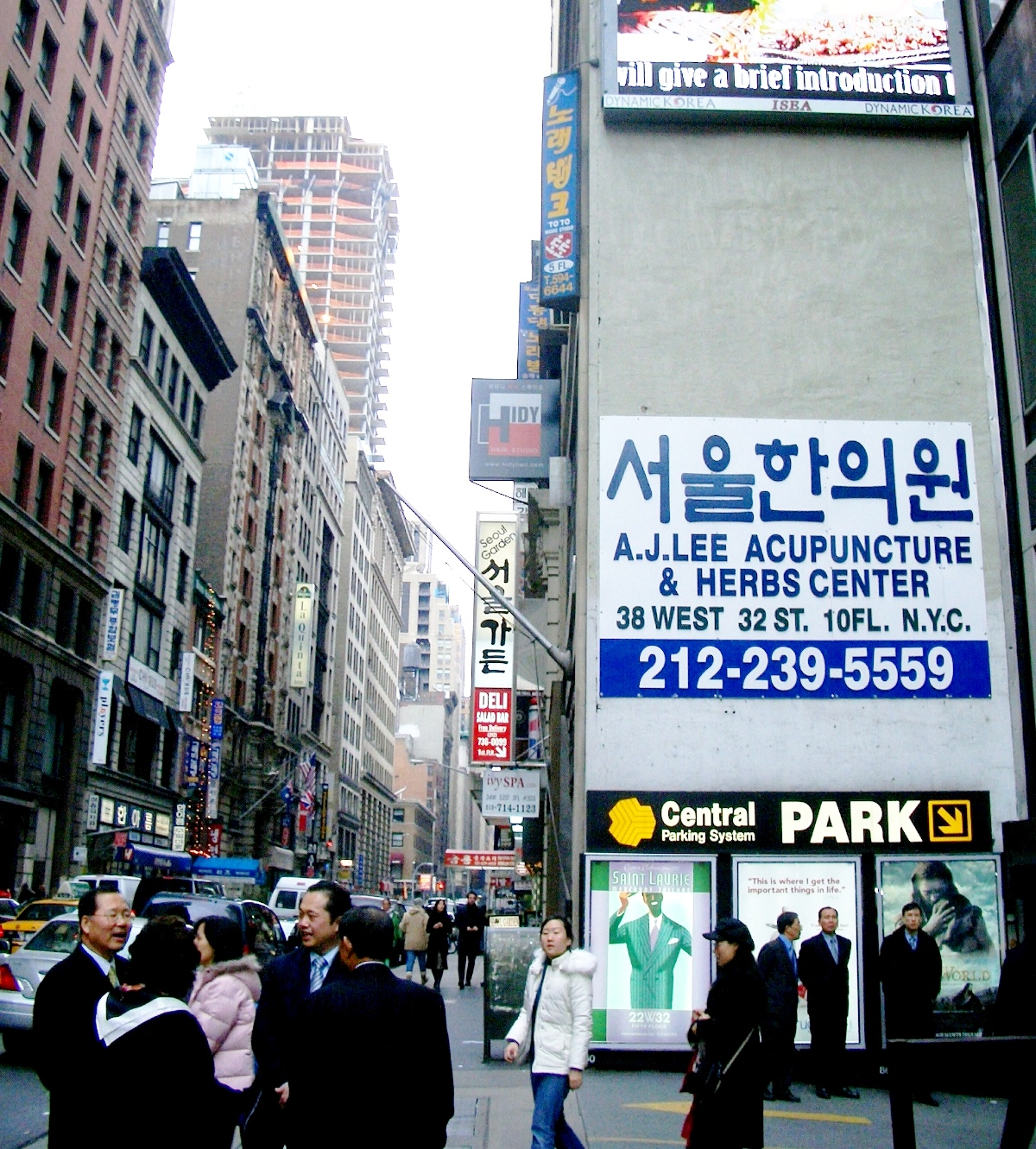
Korean Americans have achieved a high demographic profile in some U.S. cities, including New York City.

The two metropolitan areas with the highest Korean American populations as per the 2010 census were the Greater Los Angeles area Combined Statistical Area (334,329) and the Greater New York Combined Statistical Area (218,764). The Baltimore-Washington metropolitan area ranks third, with approximately 93,000 Korean Americans clustered in Howard and Montgomery Counties in Maryland and Fairfax County in Virginia. Southern California and the New York City metropolitan area have the largest populations of Koreans outside of the Korean Peninsula. Among Korean Americans born in Korea, the Los Angeles metropolitan area had 226,000 as of 2012; New York (including Northern New Jersey) had 153,000 Korean-born Korean Americans; and Washington had 60,000.

By percentage, the Korean American population of Bergen County, New Jersey, in the New York City Metropolitan Area, at 6.5% of Bergen County's population in 2022, was the highest of any county in the United States. Bergen County, host to the county's highly ranked Academies magnet public high school as well as to the North American headquarters operations of South Korean chaebols including Samsung, LG Corp, and Hanjin Shipping, was home to all of the nation's top 10 municipalities by percentage of Korean population. These top 10 municipalities in the growing Korean hub of Bergen County, New Jersey, across the George Washington Bridge from New York City, were led by Palisades Park, the municipality with the highest density of ethnic Koreans in the Western Hemisphere. Displaying ubiquitous Hangul signage and known as the Korean Village, Palisades Park uniquely comprises a Korean majority, at 53.7% of the borough's population in 2022. with both the highest Korean-American density and percentage of any municipality in the United States. The city of Los Angeles contained the highest Korean American population of any city proper in 2010, approximately 108,282. Between 1990 and 2000, Georgia was home to the fastest-growing Korean community in the U.S., growing at a rate of 88.2% over that decade. There is a significant Korean American population in the Atlanta metropolitan area, mainly in Gwinnett County (2.7% Korean) and Fulton County (1.0% Korean).

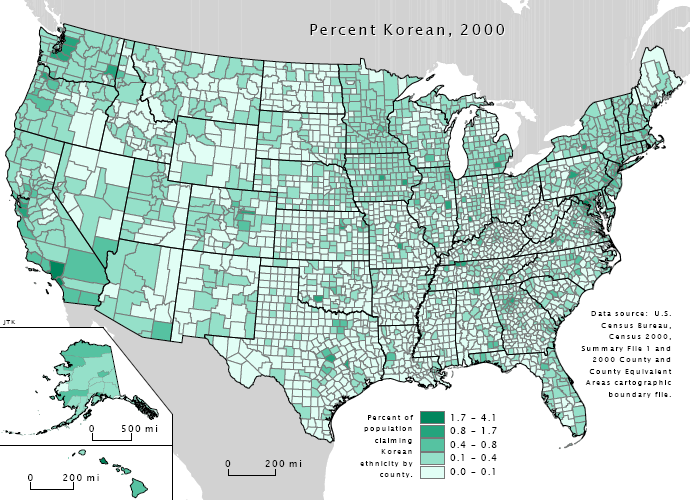
Koreans in the United States, on the census 2000

According to the statistics of the Overseas Korean Foundation and the Republic of Korea's Ministry of Foreign Affairs and Trade, 107,145 South Korean children were adopted into the United States between 1953 and 2007. In a 2005 United States Census Bureau survey, an estimated 432,907 ethnic Koreans in the U.S. were native-born Americans, and 973,780 were foreign-born. Korean Americans that were naturalized citizens numbered at 530,100, while 443,680 Koreans in the U.S. were not American citizens.

While people living in North Korea cannot—except under rare circumstances—leave their country, there are many people of North Korean origin living in the U.S., a substantial portion who fled to the south during the Korean War and later emigrated to the United States. Since the North Korean Human Rights Act of 2004 allowed North Korean defectors to be admitted as refugees, about 130 have settled in the U.S. under that status after 2004. The counties with largest Korean population are Los Angeles County and Orange County in California, Bergen County in New Jersey, and Queens County in New York.

== History ==
North and South Korean obtaining lawful permanent resident status: fiscal years 1940 to 2016

Korean Immigration to the US can be divided into four phases:

1. Small-scale immigration around 1884
2. Early immigration from 1903 to 1950
3. Immigration following the Korean war (1950–1964)
4. Immigration following the 1965 Immigration Act

=== Small-scale immigration around 1884 ===
Around 1884, following the establishment of diplomatic relations between the US and Korea (then referred to as Chosen) through the Treaty of Peace, Amity, Commerce, and Navigation, a small number of diplomats entered the US as part of the 1883 Korean special mission to the United States. Included among the members of this mission were Min Yong-ik and Yu Kil-chun, the latter of whom stayed in the US for several years to study, making him the first Korean exchange student in the US.

=== Early immigration from 1903 to 1950 ===
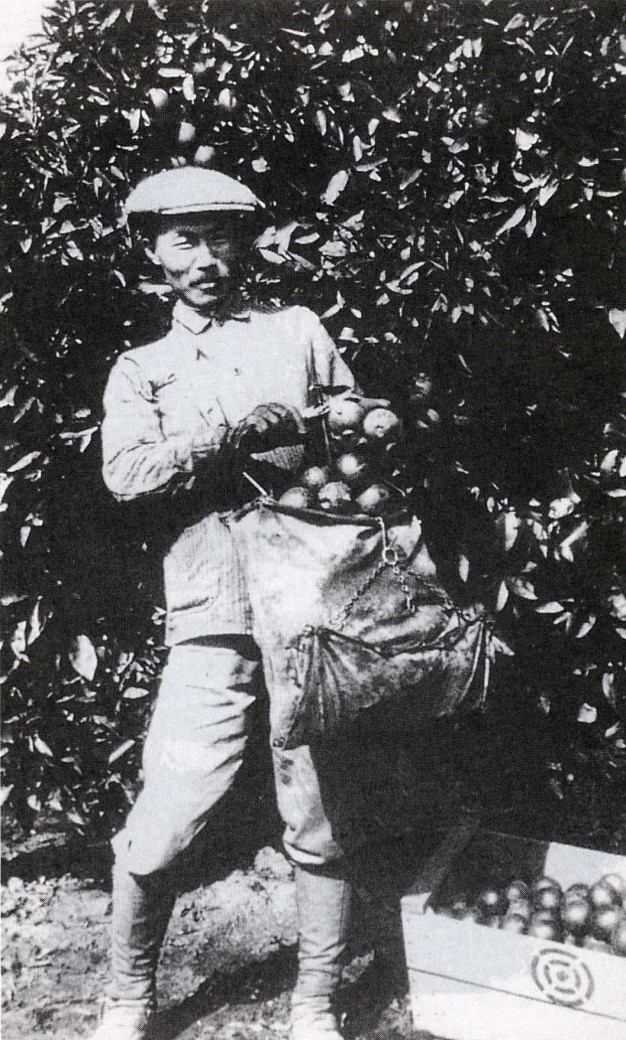
Dosan Ahn Chang Ho, picking oranges in Southern California

One of the first Korean Americans was Philip Jaisohn, who came to America in 1884 and became a leader in the movement for Korean independence. Another prominent figure among the Korean immigrant community is Ahn Chang Ho, art name Dosan, a Protestant social activist. He came to the United States in 1902 for education. He founded the Friendship Society in 1903 and the Mutual Assistance Society. He was also a political activist during the Japanese occupation of Korea.

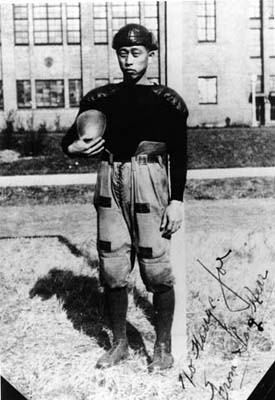
Korean American football player in Chicago, 1918

According to historian Takaki, following the annexation of Korea by Japan in 1910, Korean migrants in the United States increasingly emphasized education as a means of national survival and resistance. This emphasis was reflected in community institutions such as Hung Sa Dahn, founded in 1913 by Ahn Chang Ho, which promoted both educational development and nationalist ideals among Korean Americans. Korean immigrant communities also established Korean-language schools in cities including Sacramento, San Francisco, Riverside, and Los Angeles, viewing language education as essential to preserving cultural identity. Second-generation Korean Americans often attended these schools in addition to American public schools.

Another prominent figure among the Korean immigrant community was Syngman Rhee, a Methodist. He came to the United States in 1904 and earned a bachelor's degree at George Washington University in 1907, a master's degree at Harvard University, and a PhD from Princeton University in 1910. In 1910, he returned to Korea and became a political activist. He later became the first president of the Republic of Korea.

In 1903, the first group of Korean laborers came to Hawaii on January 13, now known annually as Korean American Day. The migration of Koreans to Hawaii can be explained by conditions in both the US and Korea. Koreans suffered from a series of natural disasters and heavy taxation. In Hawaii, plantation owners who had relied upon Chinese and Japanese labor faced a labor shortage after the Chinese Exclusion Act of 1882. Koreans were brought in as an alternative labor source. King Kojong promoted Korean immigration by establishing a Korean Department of Emigration and granting American businessmen permission to recruit Koreans for immigration to Korea.

Between 1904 and 1907, about 1,000 Koreans entered the mainland from Hawaii through San Francisco. Many Koreans dispersed along the Pacific Coast as farm workers or as wage laborers in mining companies and as section hands on the railroads. Picture brides became a common practice for marriage to Korean men. Other than those seeking better economic opportunities in the US, there were also Koreans who left for the US as refugees of the Japanese empire. Between 1910 and 1918, 541 students escaped Japan and arrived in the US through a third country. Individuals such as Whang Sa Sun, who were deeply involved in the Korean independence movement also came to the US to escape Japanese persecution. Between 1905 and 1910, political activities in Korean American communities surged in opposition towards Japanese aggression towards Korea.

Korean Americans formed organizations throughout the US, with a concentration in Hawaii and California. In 1903, the same year that the first Korean laborers arrived in Hawai, Koreans formed the Sinminhoe (New People's Association). In 1909, two of the largest Korean American organizations would merge to form the Korean National Association, the largest Korean immigrant organization in North America. Established in San Francisco, The Korean National Association, would eventually expand to 130 chapters. The organization coordinated the activities of Korean Americans across North America, holding mass protests and positioning itself as the official representative of Korean Americans. Leaders included An Changho, Syngman Rhee, and Park Yong-man. This organization, along with many others, would play a key role in the Korean independence movement between 1910 and 1945.

After the annexation of Korea by Japan in 1910, Korean migration to the United States came to a virtual halt. The Japanese colonial government had initially allowed Koreans to immigrate to the US starting in 1902, but later banned Korean emigration to secure manpower on the Korean peninsula and to protect Japanese Americans from Korean competition in the US. The Japanese government did, however, allow Korean women to immigrate to the US (many of whom arrived as picture brides) to pacify nationalist sentiment in Korean American communities. The Immigration Act of 1924 (also referred to as the Oriental Exclusion Act) also worked to systematically exclude Korean immigrants from coming to the US.

=== Immigration following the Korean War (1950–1964) ===
Due to the Immigration and Nationality Act of 1952, opportunities were more open to Asian Americans, enabling Korean Americans to move out of enclaves into middle-class neighborhoods. When the Korean War ended in 1953, small numbers of students and professionals entered the United States. A larger group of immigrants included women married with U.S. servicemen commonly referred to as "war brides". These women faced discrimination in the US as well as in South Korea, where many were labelled as whores or traitors. Following in 1953, South Korea had allowed international adoption. This had stemmed from the result of the Korean war as it left many children displaced. As a result of allowing external adoption in South Korea, a majority of the children have been adopted from families across the United States. With the passage of the Immigration and Nationality Act of 1965, Koreans became one of the fastest growing Asian groups in the United States, surpassed only by Filipinos.

=== Immigration following the 1965 Immigration Act ===
The Immigration and Nationality Act of 1965 abolished the quota system that had restricted the numbers of Asians allowed to enter the United States. Over 560,000 Koreans have immigrated to the US from 1970 to 1990. Large numbers of Koreans, including some from North Korea who had come via South Korea, have immigrated ever since, placing Korea in the top six countries of origin of immigrants to the United States since 1975. The reasons for immigration vary and include the desire for freedom and to seek better economic opportunities. The 1965 Immigration Act also generated a shift in the demographics of the Korean American community, with "new immigrants" making up the majority of the Korean American population.

=== The Korean American Experience after the 1980s ===
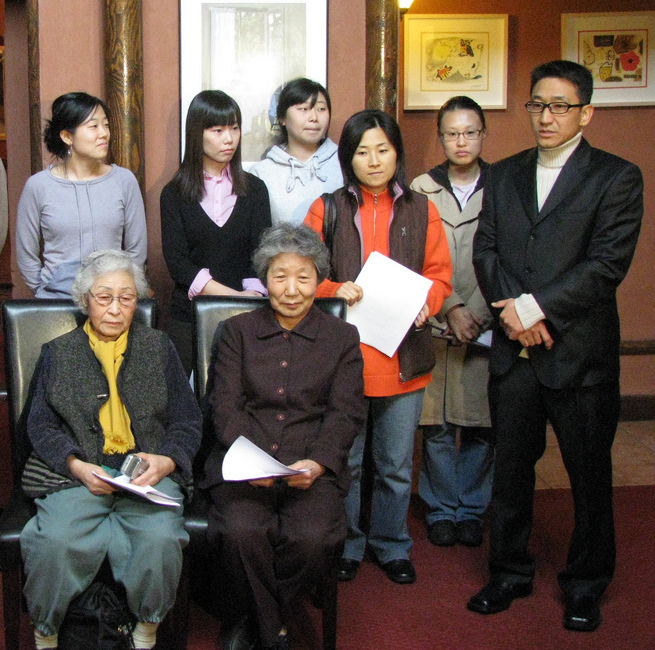
A wide range of Korean Americans

In the 1980s and 1990s, Koreans became noted not only for starting small businesses such as dry cleaners or convenience stores, but also for diligently planting churches. They would venture into abandoned cities and start up businesses which happened to be predominantly African American in demographics. This would sometimes lead to publicized tensions with customers as dramatized in movies such as Spike Lee's Do the Right Thing. Their children, along with those of other Asian Americans, would also be noted in headlines and magazine covers in the 1980s for their numbers in prestigious universities and highly skilled white collar professions. Favorable socioeconomic status and education have led to the painting of Asian Americans, including Korean Americans, as a "model minority". However, this label is a controversial one: many individuals claim that the "model minority" label derides other communities of color and dismisses the challenges that the Korean Americans, and other Asian American ethnic groups, face. For instance, 12.8% of all Korean Americans live at or below the poverty line.

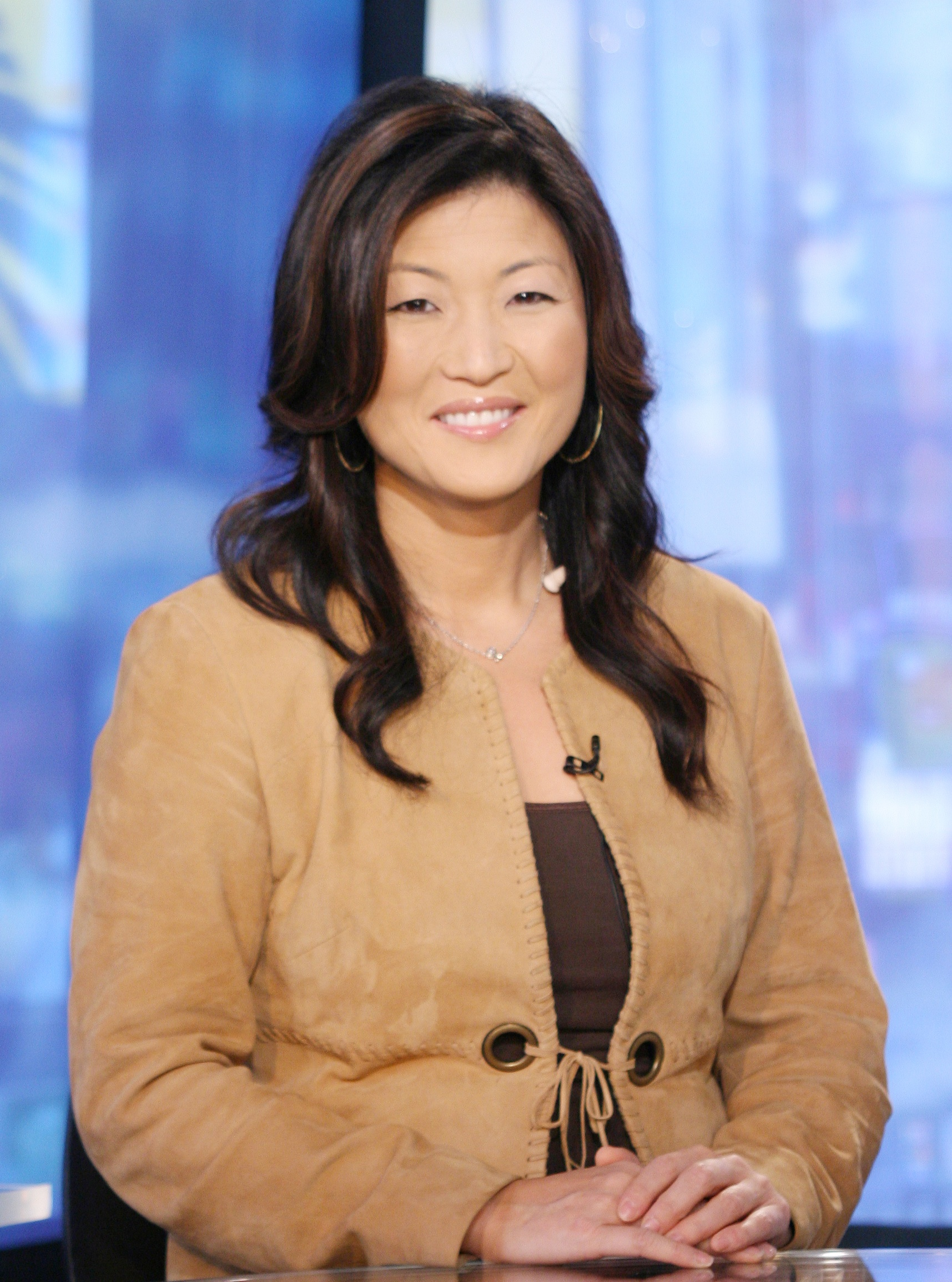
Juju Chang is a Korean American television journalist for ABC News, and currently serves as an anchor of Nightline.

A large number of Korean Americans do not have health insurance due to language access barriers. Furthermore, older Korean Americans, who are at significant risk of developing mental health conditions, are less likely to access mental health services even when exhibiting symptoms. This is due to stigma and cultural misconceptions regarding mental health conditions.

Los Angeles has emerged as a major center of the Korean American community. The city has undergone a rapid transition in the 1990s marked by an influx of Koreans and investment by Korean banks and corporations. Many entrepreneurs opened small businesses, and were hard hit by the 1992 Los Angeles riots More recently, L.A.'s Koreatown has been perceived to have experienced declining political power secondary to re-districting, and an increased crime rate, prompting an exodus of Koreans from the area. Furthermore, the aftermath of the 1992 riots witnessed a large number of Koreans from Southern California moving to the San Francisco Bay Area and opening businesses and buying property near downtown Oakland, furthering the growth of that city's Koreatown until the early 2000s.

According to Park (1998), the violence against Korean Americans in 1992 stimulated a new wave of political activism among Korean Americans, but it also split them into two main camps. The "liberals" sought to unite with other minorities in Los Angeles to fight against racial oppression and scapegoating. The "conservatives," emphasized law and order and generally favored the economic and social policies of the Republican Party. The conservatives tended to emphasize the political differences between Koreans and other minorities, specifically blacks and Hispanics. Abelmann and Lie, (1997) report that the most profound result was the politicization of Korean Americans, all across the U.S. The younger generation especially realized they had been too uninvolved in American politics, and the riot shifted their political attention from South Korea to conditions in the United States.

Also accelerated by the 1992 riots, Orange County's Korean population grew from its starting point in Koreatown, Garden Grove. As of 2020, Orange County had the second largest number of Korean Americans of any county in America, neighboring Los Angeles County has the most, numbering over 229,593. Koreans originally moved into Garden Grove after Olympic gold medalist Sammy Lee bought a home in the 1950s signaling to other ethnic minorities that they could move into Orange County. Since then, Koreans have spread throughout northern Orange County, mainly concentrating in Buena Park, Fullerton, Cerritos, La Palma, Cypress, and Irvine. Garden Grove is now home to more than 1,500 Korean businesses, and has held a Korean festival, night market, and parade every year since 1983. Mostly older and more traditional Korean businesses and food are found in Garden Grove, while newer and trendier Seoul based chains often locate in Buena Park and Irvine. The Source OC is a multi-level Korean themed mall in Buena Park that houses over 100 restaurants, as well as Korean themed bars, a school, K-pop stores, and a PC gaming café.

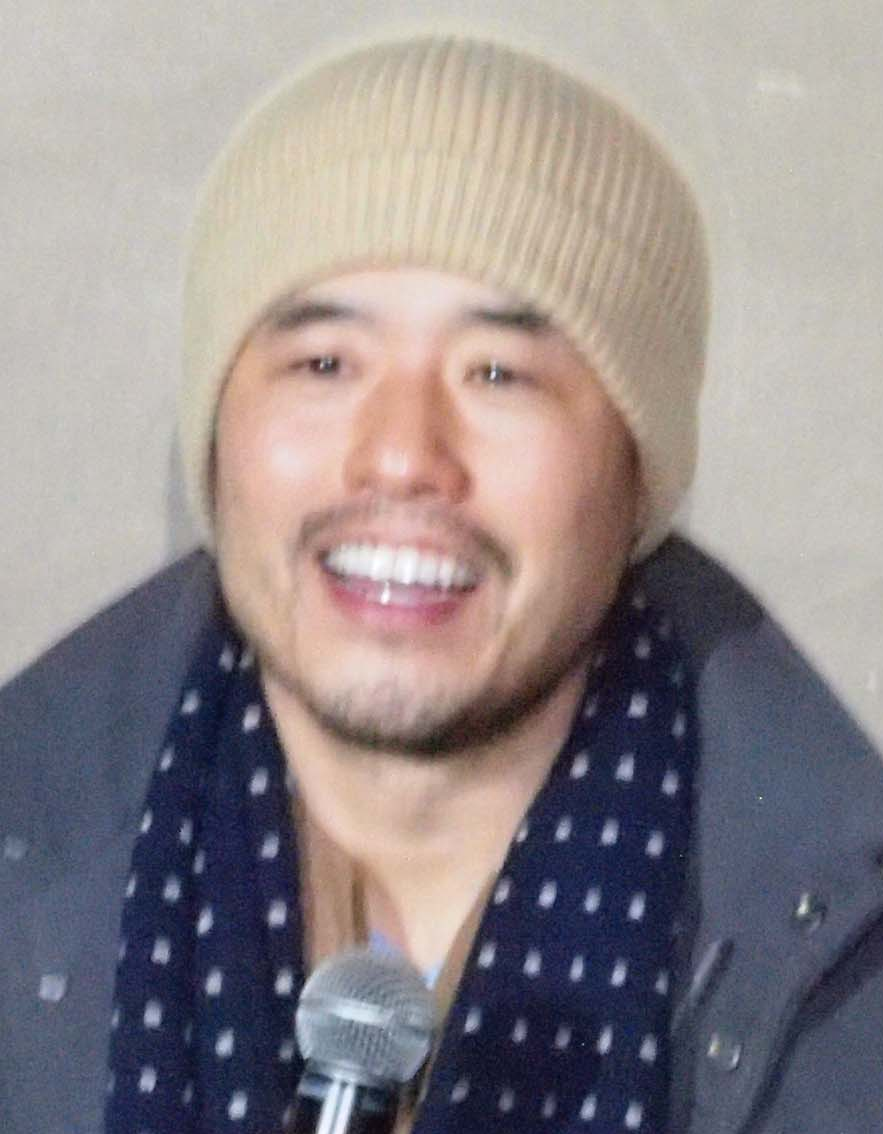
Actor Randall Park, who since 2015 portrayed Eddie Huang's father, Taiwanese-American restaurateur Louis Huang, in ABC's television show Fresh Off the Boat.

A substantial number of affluent Korean American professionals have settled in Bergen County, New Jersey since the early 2000s (decade) and have founded various academically and communally supportive organizations, including the Korean Parent Partnership Organization at the Bergen County Academies magnet high school and The Korean-American Association of New Jersey. Holy Name Medical Center in Teaneck, New Jersey, within Bergen County, has undertaken an effort to provide comprehensive health care services to underinsured and uninsured Korean patients from a wide area with its Korean Medical Program, drawing over 1,500 Korean American patients to its annual health festival. Bergen County's Broad Avenue Koreatown in Palisades Park has emerged as a dominant nexus of Korean American culture, and its Senior Citizens Center provides a popular gathering place where even Korean grandmothers were noted to follow the dance trend of the worldwide viral hit Gangnam Style by South Korean "K-pop" rapper Psy in September 2012; while the nearby Fort Lee Koreatown is also emerging as such. The Chusok Korean Thanksgiving harvest festival has become an annual tradition in Bergen County, attended by several tens of thousands.

Bergen County's growing Korean community was cited by county executive Kathleen Donovan in the context of Hackensack, New Jersey attorney Jae Y. Kim's appointment to Central Municipal Court judgeship in January 2011. Subsequently, in January 2012, New Jersey Governor Chris Christie nominated attorney Phillip Kwon of Bergen County for New Jersey Supreme Court justice, although this nomination was rejected by the state's Senate Judiciary Committee, and in July 2012, Kwon was appointed instead as deputy general counsel of the Port Authority of New York and New Jersey. According to The Record of Bergen County, the U.S. Census Bureau has determined the county's Korean American population—2010 census figures put it at 56,773 (increasing to 63,247 by the 2011 American Community Survey)—grew enough to warrant language assistance during elections, and Bergen County's Koreans have become a significant voice in local politics. As of May 2014, Korean Americans had garnered at least four borough council seats in Bergen County.

=== Flatbush boycott ===
In 1990, Korean American owned shops were boycotted in the Flatbush section of the borough of Brooklyn in New York City. The boycott started by Black Nationalist, Sonny Carson, lasted for six months and became known as the Flatbush boycott.

=== Comfort women ===
In May 2012, officials in Bergen County's borough of Palisades Park, New Jersey rejected requests by two diplomatic delegations from Japan to remove a small monument from a public park, a brass plaque on a block of stone, dedicated in 2010 to the memory of comfort women, thousands of women, many Koreans, who were forced into sexual slavery by Japanese soldiers during World War II. Days later, a South Korean delegation endorsed the borough's decision. However, in neighboring Fort Lee, various Korean American groups could not reach consensus on the design and wording for such a monument as of early April 2013. In October 2012, a similar memorial was announced in nearby Hackensack, to be raised behind the Bergen County Courthouse, alongside memorials to the Holocaust, the Great Irish Famine, the Armenian genocide, and Slavery in the United States and was unveiled in March 2013. An apology and monetary compensation of roughly $8,000,000 by Japan to South Korea in December 2015 for these crimes largely fell flat in Bergen County, where the first U.S. monument to pay respects to comfort women was erected.

=== East Sea controversy ===
According to The Record, the Korean American Association of New Jersey petitioned Bergen County school officials in 2013 to use textbooks that refer to the Sea of Japan as the East Sea as well. In February 2014, Bergen County lawmakers announced legislative efforts to include the name East Sea in future New Jersey school textbooks. In April 2014, a bill to recognize references to the Sea of Japan also as the East Sea in Virginia textbooks was signed into law.

=== Sewol ferry tragedy memorial in the United States ===
In May 2014, the Palisades Park Public Library in New Jersey created a memorial dedicated to the victims of the tragic sinking of the Sewol ferry off the South Korean coast on April 16, 2014.

=== Nail salon abuse ===
According to a 2015 investigation by The New York Times, abuse by Korean nail salon owners in New York City and Long Island was rampant, with 70 to 80% of nail salon owners in New York being Korean, per the Korean American Nail Salon Association; with the growth and concentration in the number of salons in New York City far outstripping the remainder of the United States since 2000, according to the U.S. Census Bureau. Abuses routinely included underpayment and non-payment to employees for services rendered, exacting poor working conditions, and stratifying pay scales and working conditions for Korean employees above non-Koreans.

=== Recent statistics ===
It is hard to determine the accuracy of this reporting due to the figures being sourced from the Korean Consulate in Korea, and the channels of various Korean-affiliated organizations. For example, tens of thousands of immigrant women who have been married to USFK since the 1950s and who have been adopted since the liberation of the United States have not been identified in the Korean consulate statistics.

== Languages ==
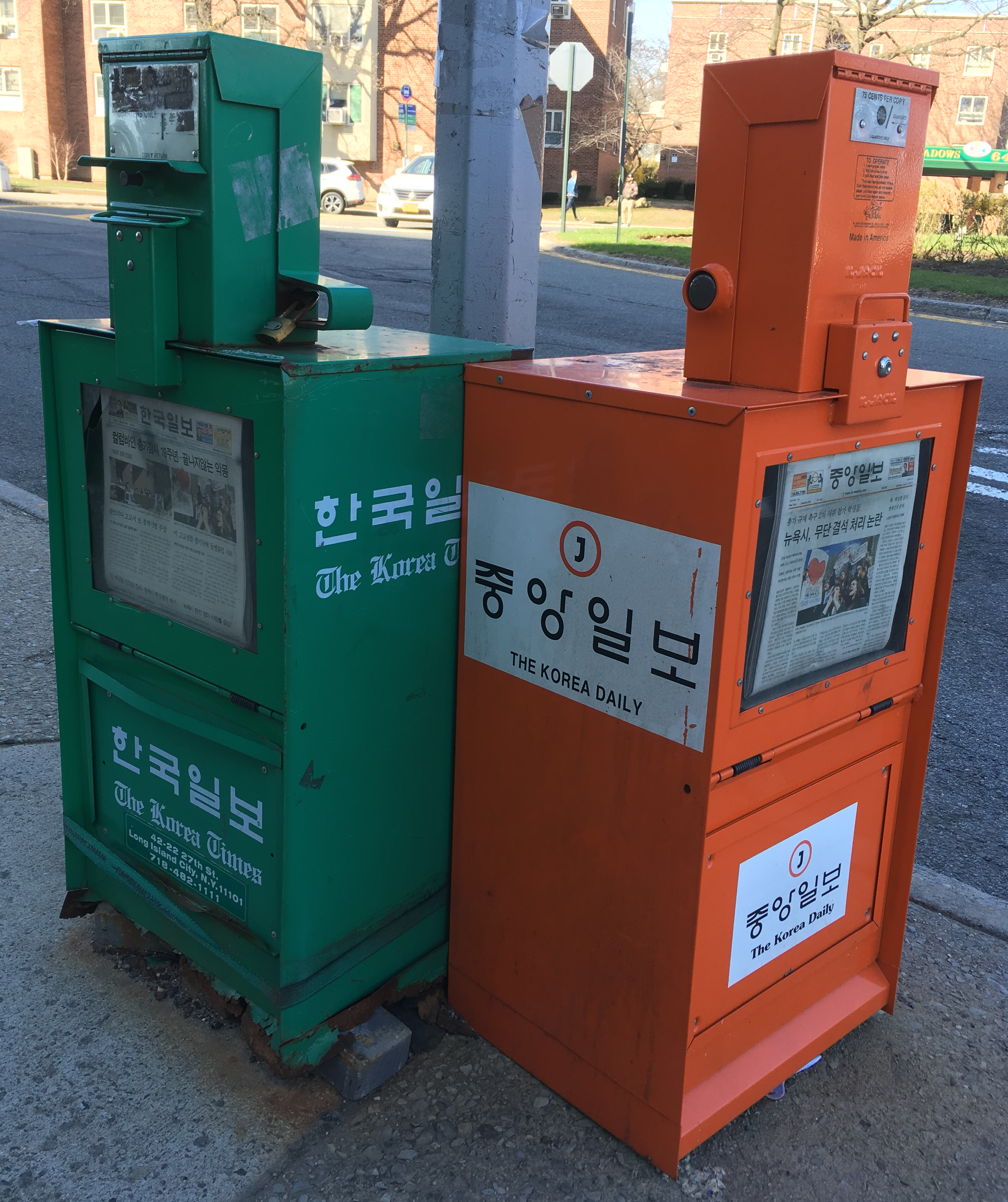
Korean-language newspapers being sold in the United States (2018)

Korean Americans can speak a combination of English and Korean depending on where they were born and when they immigrated to the United States. New immigrants often use a mixture of Korean and English (Konglish), a practice also known as code-switching.

== Memorials and celebrities ==
Korean American Day, celebrated on January 13, commemorates the arrival of the first Korean immigrants to the United States on January 13, 1903. This day was first proclaimed by President George W. Bush in 2003 and officially recognized by the U.S. Congress in 2005. It honors the significant contributions of Korean Americans in various fields such as small business, the military, faith leadership, medicine, the arts, and politics, reflecting over a century of their impact on American society.

Celebrities are named at List of Korean Americans.

== Politics ==
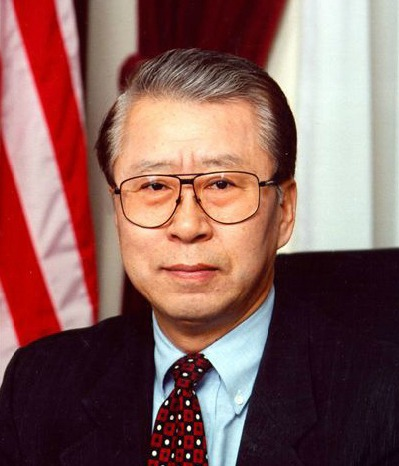
Jay Kim (R-CA)

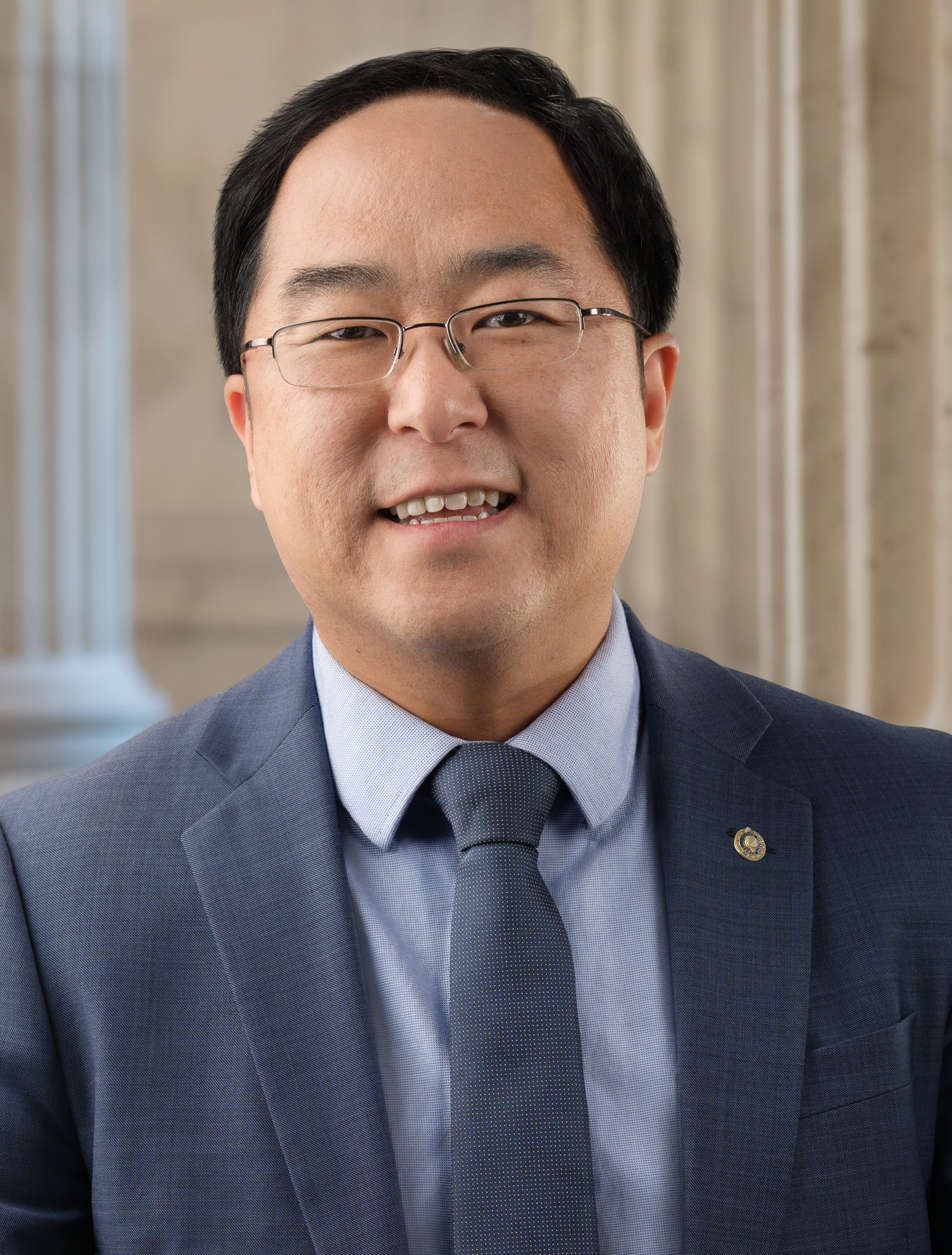
Andy Kim (D-NJ)

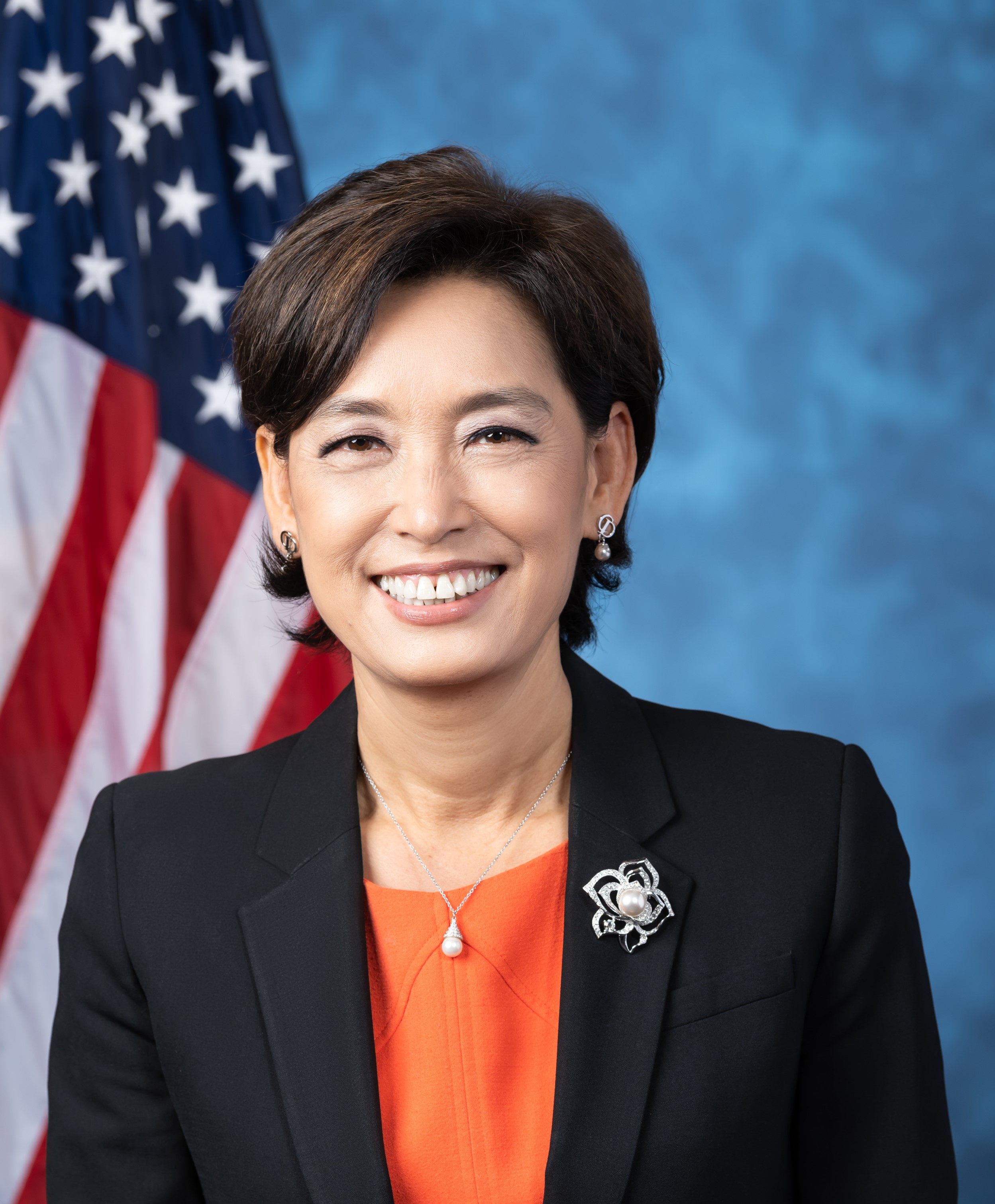
Young Kim (R-CA)

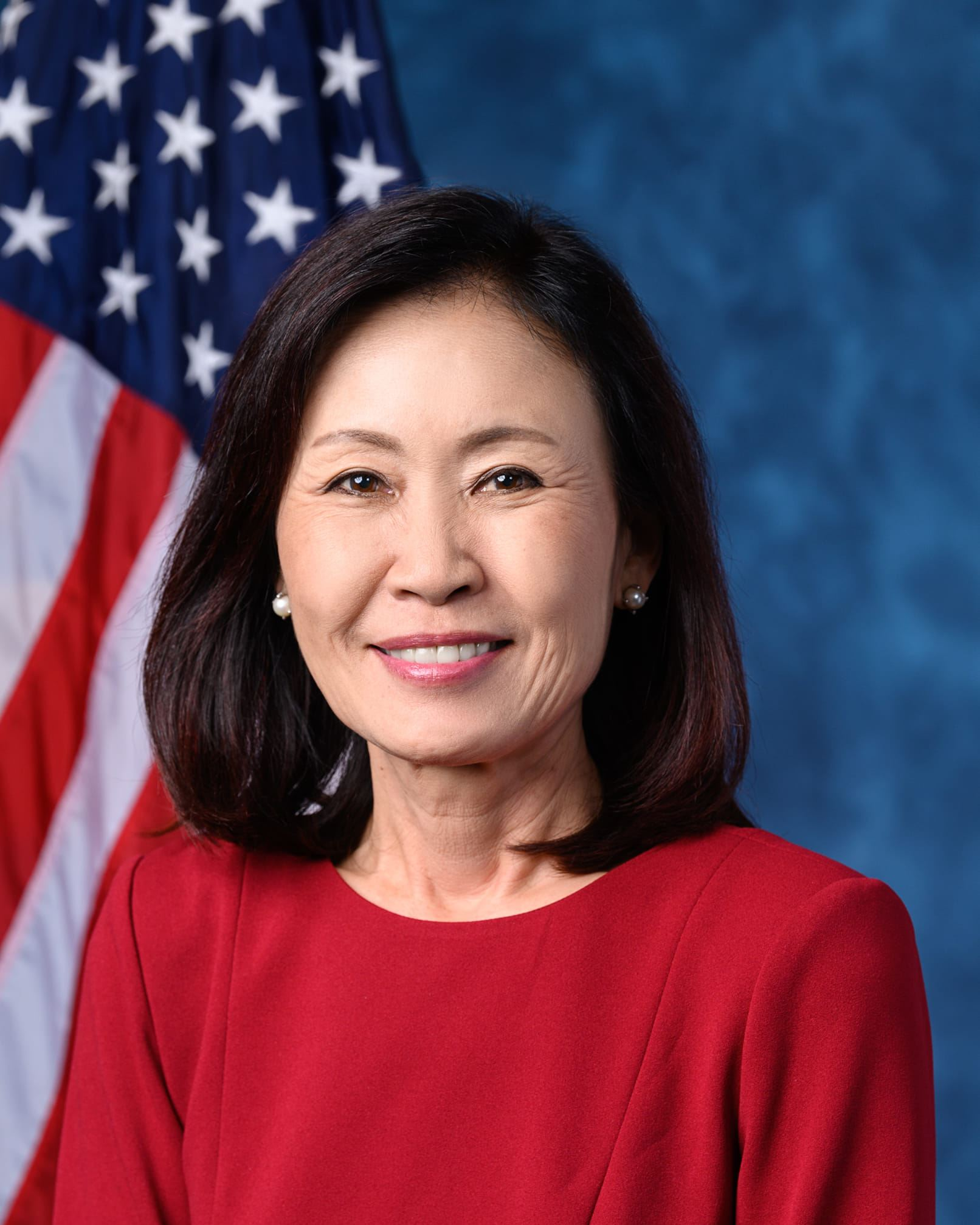
Michelle Steel (R-CA)

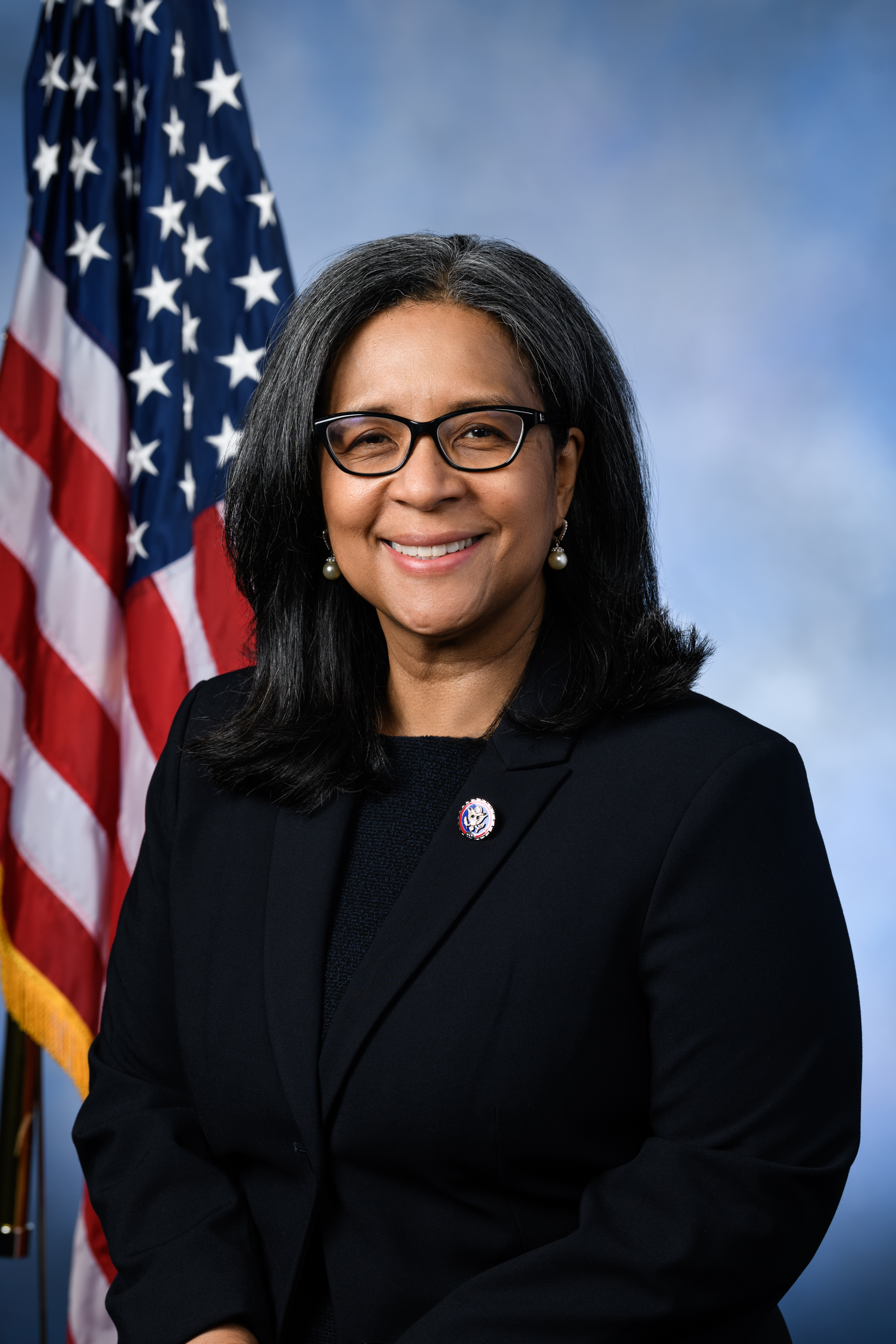
Marilyn Strickland (D-WA)

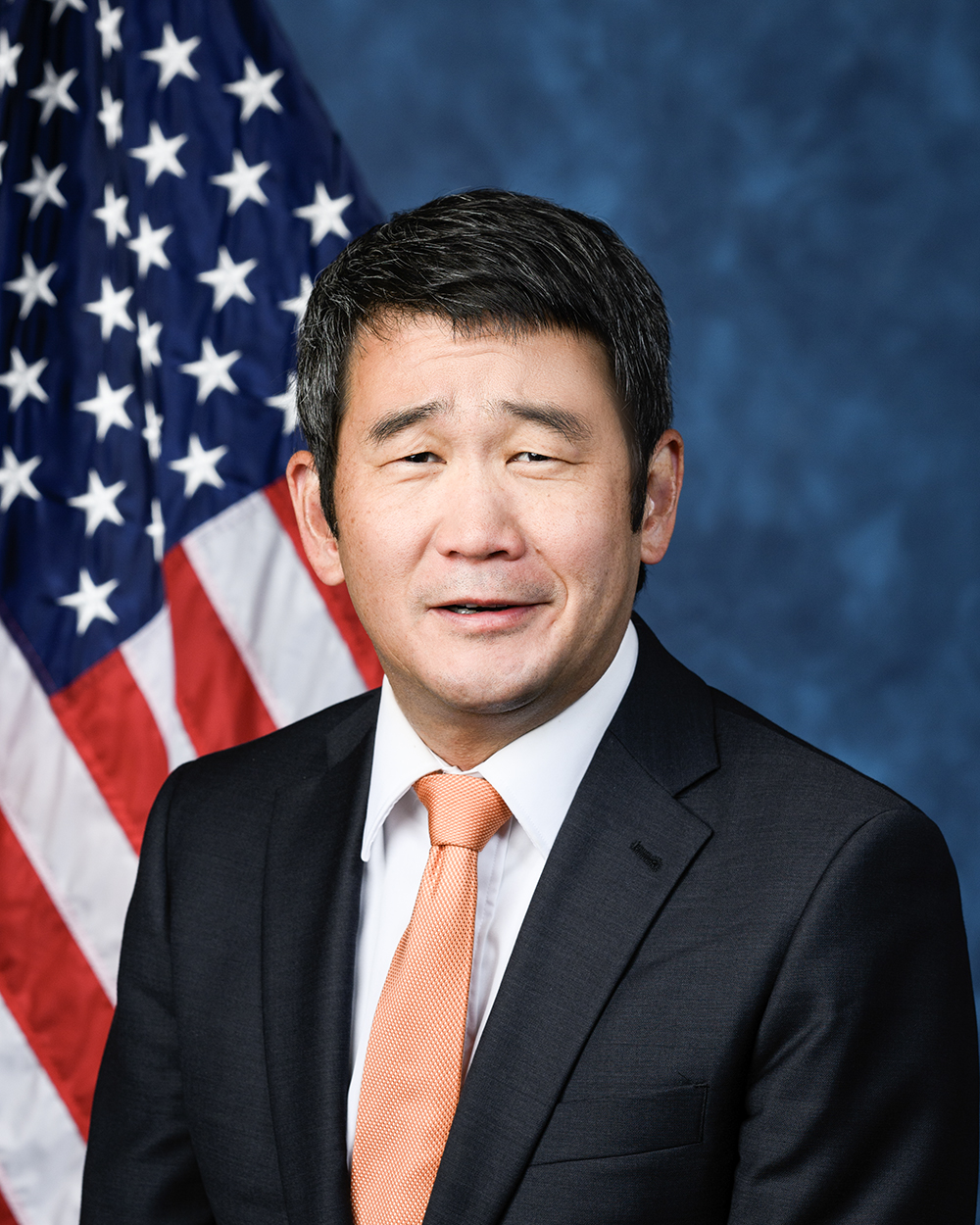
Dave Min (D-CA)

In a poll from the Asia Times before the 2004 U.S. presidential election, Korean Americans narrowly favored Republican candidate George W. Bush by a 41% to 38% margin over Democrat John Kerry, with the remaining 19% undecided or voting for other candidates. However, according to a poll done by the AALDEF, the majority of Korean Americans that voted in the 2004 presidential election favored Democrat John Kerry by a 66% to 33% margin over Republican candidate George W. Bush. And another poll done by the AALDEF suggest the majority of Korean Americans that voted in the 2008 presidential election favored Democrat Barack Obama by a 64% to 35% margin over Republican John McCain In the 2008 U.S. presidential election, Korean Americans favored Democrat Barack Obama over Republican John McCain, around 59% to 41%. However, there are still more registered Republican Korean Americans than registered Democrats. Korean Americans, due to their Republican and Christian leanings, overwhelmingly supported California's constitutional gay marriage ban, Proposition 8.

According to a multilingual exit poll from the 2012 election, 77% of Korean Americans voted for Democrat Barack Obama, while only 20% voted for Republican Mitt Romney. The poll also showed that 60% of Korean Americans identify themselves as being Democrats, while only 14% of Korean Americans identify themselves as being Republican.

In the 2016 presidential election, a majority of Korean Americans (75%) voted for Hillary Clinton.

=== Korean Americans in Congress ===
Elected in 1992, Jay Kim was the first Korean American person elected to Congress. He represented portions of Orange County, California. He was defeated for re-election in the Republican primary in 1998.

In 2018, Andy Kim was elected to Congress from central New Jersey, becoming the first Democratic and second overall Korean American to serve in Congress.

The 2020 elections saw the first three Korean American women elected to Congress, Republicans Young Kim and Michelle Steel of California and Democrat Marilyn Strickland of Washington.

In 2024, Andy Kim became the first Korean-American to be elected as a United States Senator and was sworn in on December 9, 2024. Democrat Dave Min of California was also elected to the House of Representatives that year.

Out of the six Korean Americans elected to the U.S. Congress, only Andy Kim and Dave Min were born in the United States: Jay Kim, Young Kim, Michelle Steel, and Marilyn Strickland were all born in Korea and immigrated, with Strickland having a father in the American military.

1. Andy Kim: Kim was born on July 12, 1982, in Boston, Massachusetts to Korean immigrant parents. He has been serving as a member of the Democratic Party representing New Jersey since January 3, 2019. He is the first Korean-American to serve in the United States Senate, having assumed office on December 9, 2024.
2. Young Kim: Young Kim was born on October 18, 1962, in Incheon, South Korea. She is a Republican Congresswoman representing California's 39th Congressional District, having assumed office on January 3, 2021.
3. Michelle Steel: Born in South Korea, Michelle Park Steel is a Republican Congresswoman representing California's 48th Congressional District. She has been serving since January 3, 2021.
4. Marilyn Strickland: Marilyn Strickland was born in Seoul, South Korea. She is a Democratic Congresswoman representing Washington's 10th Congressional District and has been in office since January 3, 2021. Strickland is notably the first African-American to represent Washington State at the federal level and the first Korean-American woman elected to Congress in its history.
5. Dave Min: Min was born in Providence, Rhode Island to South Korean immigrants. He is a Democratic Congressman representing California's 47th Congressional District since January 3, 2025.
6. Jay Kim: Jay Kim, who served in the past, was born in 1939 in Gyeongseong (now Seoul), South Korea, during the Japanese occupation of Korea. He immigrated to the United States in 1961 and later served as a Republican Congressman.

== Religion ==
Religious Makeup of Korean-Americans (2012)
1. Protestantism (61.0%)
2. Unaffiliated (23.0%)
3. Catholicism (10.0%)
4. Buddhism (6.00%)

Korean Americans have historically had a very strong Christian—particularly Protestant—heritage. Between 60% and 65% identify as Christian; 40% of those consist of immigrants who were not Christians at the time of their arrival in the United States. There are about 4,000 Korean Christian churches in the United States. According to a 2016 survey, Presbyterian churches accounted for 42%, followed by Baptists (17%) and Methodists (12%). However, according to a study by UC Riverside in 2020, 64% of Korean American Christians identify as Presbyterians, followed by Methodists (11%) and Baptists (7%).

According to a survey conducted in 2022–2023, Korean Americans have the second-largest percentage of individuals who identity as Christian among Asian Americans. Fifty-nine percent of Korean Americans identify as Christian. These statistics are in contrast with other Asian American groups such as the Chinese, Japanese, Indian, and Vietnamese of whom 15 to 36% identify as Christian.

The majority of Korean Americans across various social categories go to church. Won Moo Hurh attributes this to 4 factors, including the Christian backgrounds of both early and recent immigrants and the ethnic function of the Korean American Church. Many early Korean immigrants were Christians in Korea who came to the US through the support of American missionaries. The churches established by early Korean immigrants thus became associated with ethnic organizations. Korean immigrants who arrived in the US following the US Immigration Act of 1965 also came from urban middle-class backgrounds and were predominantly Christian.

In 2004, there are 89 Korean Buddhist temples in the United States; the largest such temple, Los Angeles' Sa Chal Temple, was established in 1974. A small minority, about 2 to 10% of Korean Americans are Buddhist. Reasons given for the conversion of immigrant Korean families to Christianity include the responsiveness of Christian churches to immigrant needs as well as their communal nature, whereas Buddhist temples foster individual spirituality and practice and provide fewer social networking and business opportunities, as well as social pressure from other Koreans to convert. Most Korean American Christians do not practice traditional Confucian ancestral rites practiced in Korea (in Korea, most Catholics, Buddhists, and nonbelievers practice these rites).

== Socio-economic status ==
According to a 2019 analysis of 2017–2019 American Community Survey by the Pew Research Center, the median annual household income of all Koreans in the U.S. was $72,200 (less than the $85,800 for all Asians in the U.S.). The median household income of US-born Koreans, however, was $88,100 exceeding the median household income for all Asians in the U.S.

In terms of employment (of civilians aged 16 or older), 62% of all Koreans in the U.S. were employed as compared to 62% for all Asians in the U.S. At an employment rate of 68%, U.S. born Koreans were slightly more likely to be employed than foreign born Koreans who have an employment rate of 59%.

== Cuisine ==
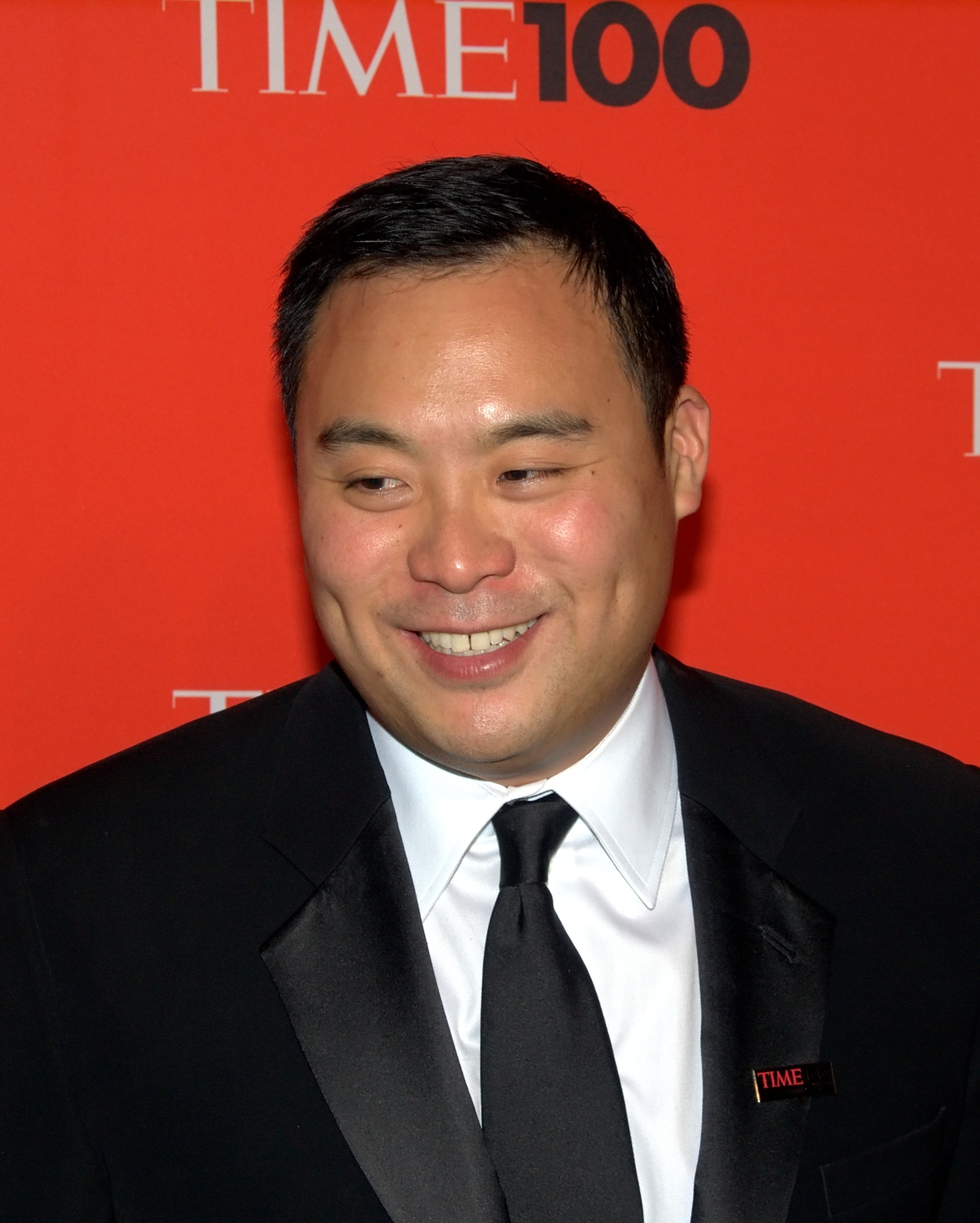
David Chang, at the Time 100 gala in Manhattan, is a Korean American restaurateur, author, and television personality.

"Korean American cuisine" can be described as a fusion of traditional Korean cuisine with American culture and tastes. Dishes such as "Korean tacos" have emerged from the contacts between Korean bodega owners and their Mexican workers in the Los Angeles area, spreading from one food truck (Kogi Korean BBQ) in November 2008 to the national stage eighteen months later.

According to Chef Roy Choi (of Kogi Korean BBQ fame), sundubu-jjigae was a dish developed by Korean immigrants in Los Angeles. In 2021, Thrillist named Bergen County, New Jersey as America's best Korean barbecue destination.

Often, chefs borrow from Korean flavors and preparation techniques that they will integrate into the style they are most comfortable with (whether it be Tex-Mex, Chinese or purely American). Even a classic staple of the American diet, the hamburger, is available with a Korean twist—bulgogi (Korean BBQ) burgers.

As interest in cooking and dining has grown, consumers and culinary professionals have increasingly explored a wider range of specialty and regional cuisines. Korean cuisine, which had long been established within Korean American communities, became increasingly available to a broader American audience through Koreatowns and Korean restaurants in metropolitan areas, including Los Angeles; Garden Grove and Buena Park in Orange County, California; Queens and Manhattan in New York City; Palisades Park and Fort Lee in Bergen County, New Jersey; Annandale, Virginia; Philadelphia; Atlanta; Dallas; and Chicago. Korean cuisine is characterized by a range of distinctive flavors, colors, and preparation styles. Common examples include kimchi, an often spicy dish made of salted and fermented vegetables (baechu-kimchi, kkaktugi), long-fermented pastes (gochujang, doenjang), rice cake or noodle dishes and stews (tteok-bokki, naengmyun), marinated and grilled meats (bulgogi, galbi), and many seafood dishes using fish cakes, octopus, squid, shellfish and fish.

The Korean dining scene was noted to have grown sharply in New Jersey during 2018. Broad Avenue in Bergen County's Palisades Park Koreatown in New Jersey has evolved into a Korean dessert destination as well; while a five-mile long "Kimchi Belt" has emerged in the Long Island Koreatown in New York.

Korean coffeehouse chain Caffe Bene, also serving misugaru, has attracted Korean American entrepreneurs as franchisees to launch its initial expansion into the United States, starting with Bergen County, New Jersey and the New York City Metropolitan Area.

== Unauthorized immigration ==
In 2012, the Department of Homeland Security estimated that there were 230,000 "unauthorized immigrants" born in South Korea; they are the seventh-largest nationality of unauthorized immigrants behind those from Mexico, El Salvador, Guatemala, Honduras, the Philippines and India.

== See also ==
- Asian Americans
- International adoption of South Korean children
- KoreAm
- Korean Americans in Greater Los Angeles
- Korean diaspora
- Korean National Association
- Koreans in New York City
- Koreans in Washington, D.C.
- Koreans
- Koreatown
  - Koreatown, Fort Lee
  - Koreatown, Long Island
  - Koreatown, Los Angeles
  - Koreatown, Manhattan
  - Koreatown, Palisades Park
  - Koreatown, Philadelphia
- List of American writers of Korean descent
- List of Korean Americans
- National Korean American Service & Education Consortium (NAKASEC) – progressive immigrant rights organization
- yKAN
- North Korea–United States relations
- South Korea–United States relations
- Council of Korean Americans
