= List of U.S. cities with significant Korean American populations =

U.S. cities with significant Korean-American populations
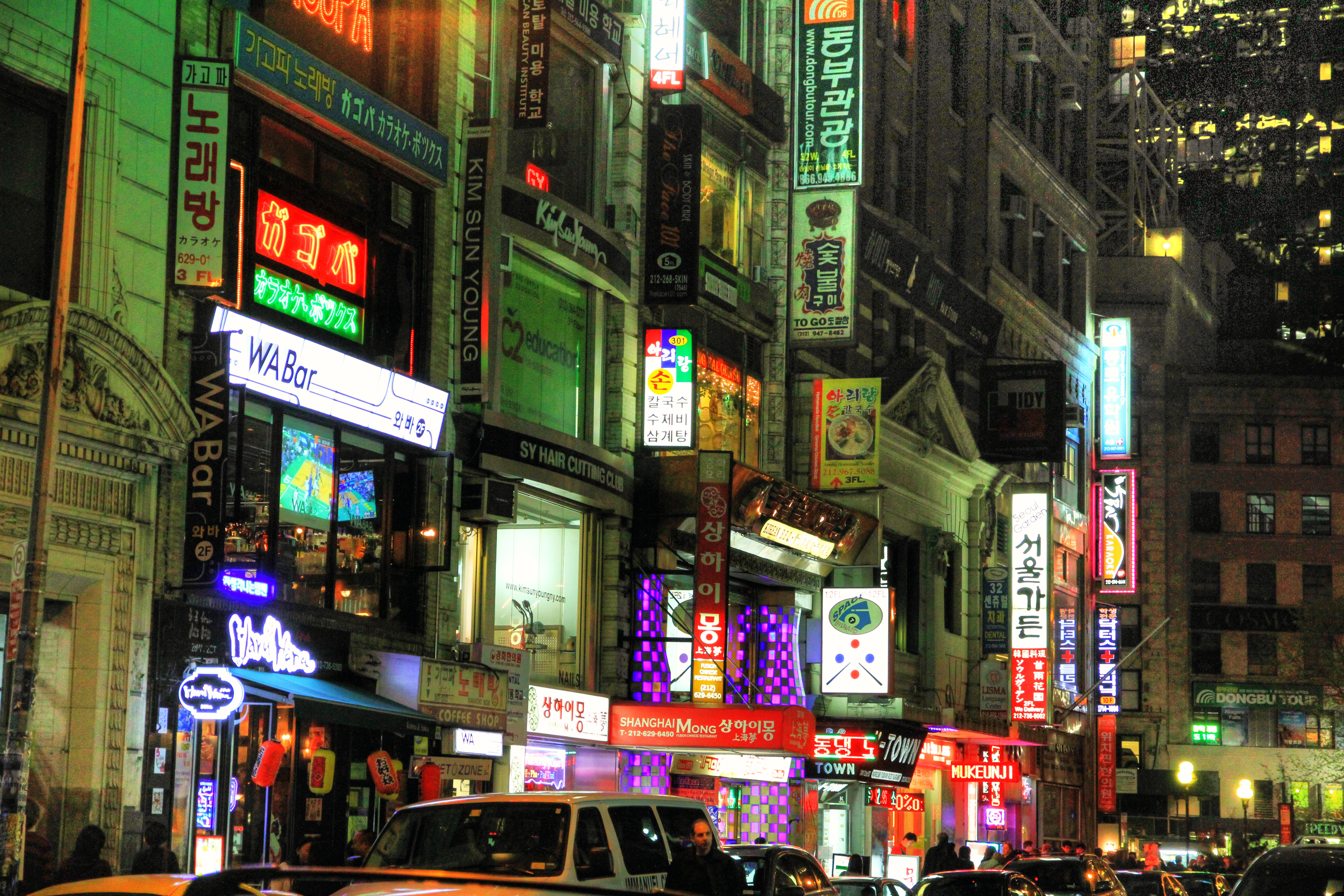
- Korean signs in Koreatown, Manhattan

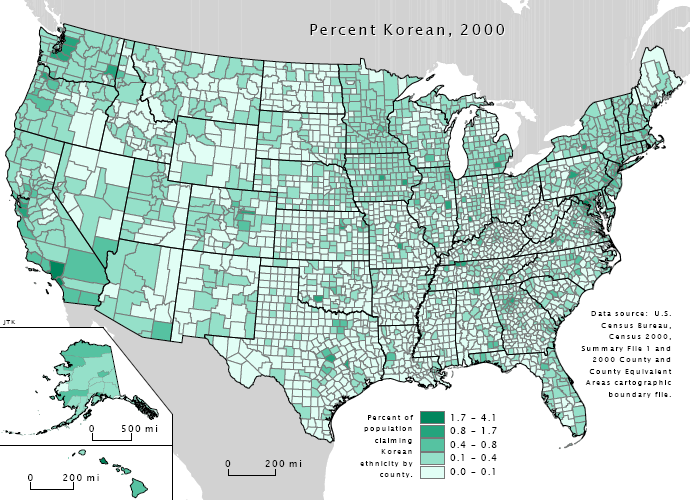

Cities with significant Korean American populations represent municipalities with critical masses of Korean Americans in their total urban or suburban populations. Information is based on the 2005-2009 American Community Survey or as specified in each table. The list includes those who have emigrated from South Korea as well as Korean Americans of multiple generations. There are numbers of North Koreans living in the United States, despite North Korean citizens being unable to freely emigrate out of their country. As of 2022, Americans of Korean descent composed an estimate of 1.8 to 2 million people.

The three metropolitan areas with the highest Korean American populations as per the 2009 American Community Survey were the Greater Los Angeles Combined Statistical Area (300,000), the Greater New York Combined Statistical Area (200,000), and the Washington-Baltimore Metropolitan Area (93,000). Southern California and the New York City Metropolitan Area have the largest populations of Koreans outside of the Korean Peninsula. Among Korean Americans born in Korea, the Los Angeles metropolitan area had 226,000 as of 2012; Greater New York (including Northern New Jersey) was home to 153,000 Korean-born Korean Americans; and metropolitan Washington, D.C., with 60,000.

By percentage, the Korean American population of Bergen County, New Jersey, in the New York City Metropolitan Area, at 6.5% of Bergen County's population in 2022, was the highest of any county in the United States. Bergen County, host to the county's highly ranked Academies magnet public high school as well as to the North American headquarters operations of South Korean chaebols including Samsung, LG Corp, and Hanjin Shipping, was home to all of the nation's top 10 municipalities by percentage of Korean population. These top 10 municipalities in the growing Korean hub of Bergen County, New Jersey, across the George Washington Bridge from New York City, were led by Palisades Park, the municipality with the highest density of ethnic Koreans in the Western Hemisphere. Displaying ubiquitous Hangul signage and known as the Korean Village, Palisades Park uniquely comprises a Korean majority, at 53.7% of the borough's population in 2022. with both the highest Korean-American density and percentage of any municipality in the United States. The city of Los Angeles contained the highest Korean American population of any city proper in 2010, approximately 108,282.

== Metropolitan areas ==
The list of the ten largest U.S. metropolitan areas by Korean population based on mixed-race and mixed-group populations, regardless of Hispanic origin.

Rank	Metro Area	Korean-Americans 2019
1	Los Angeles	326,000
2	New York	220,000
3	Washington	96,000
4	Seattle	67,000
5	Chicago	62,000
6	San Francisco	60,000
7	Atlanta	51,000
8	Philadelphia	42,000
9	Dallas	41,000
10	San Jose	36,000

== Large cities ==
The list of large cities (population greater than 250,000) with a Korean-American population of at least 1% of the total population.

Rank	City	State	Korean-Americans 2010	Percentage 2010	Korean-Americans 2015	Percentage 2015
1	Los Angeles	California	108,282	2.9%	110,679	2.8%
2	Honolulu	Hawaii	22,179	2.3%	20,729	2.1%
3	Anaheim	California	6,575	2.0%	6,696	1.9%
4	San Jose	California	12,409	1.3%	12,939	1.3%
5	New York City	New York	96,741	1.2%	91,729	1.1%
6	Aurora	Colorado	3,646	1.2%	3,379	1.0%
7	Anchorage	Alaska	3,251	1.2%	3,799	1.3%
8	San Francisco	California	8,661	1.1%	9,601	1.1%
9	Seattle	Washington	5,801	1.0%	7,203	1.1%
10	Plano	Texas	2,521	1.0%	3,116	1.1%

== Medium-sized cities ==
List of medium-sized cities (population between 100,000 and 250,000) with a Korean-American population of at least 1% of the total population.

Rank	City	State	Korean-Americans	Percentage
1	Fullerton	California	15,544	11.5%
2	Torrance	California	10,857	7.8%
3	Irvine	California	13,130	6.6%
4	Glendale	California	10,723	5.5%
5	Santa Clara	California	3,494	3.0%
6	Bellevue	Washington	3,459	2.9%
7	Ann Arbor	Michigan	2,885	2.5%
8	Schaumburg	Illinois	2,576	2.1%
9	Killeen	Texas	1,869	2.15%
10	Berkeley	California	2,036	2.0%
11	Cambridge	Massachusetts	1,699	1.6%
12	Fremont	California	2,968	1.5%
13	Tacoma	Washington	2,416	1.4%
14	Carrollton	Texas	2,524	1.3%
15	Santa Clarita	California	1,854	1.1%

== Municipalities with density of at least 500 Korean Americans per square mile in 2010 ==
Main articles: Koreatown, Palisades Park (팰리세이즈파크 코리아타운) and Koreatown, Fort Lee (포트리 코리아타운)

(Note that Manhattan and Queens are official boroughs of New York City.)

Rank	Municipality	County or city	State	Korean Americans	Density of Korean Americans per square mile	Percentage of municipality's population
1	Palisades Park	Bergen County	New Jersey	10,860	8,681.0 (2022)	53.7%
2	Fort Lee	Bergen County	New Jersey	8,318	3,273.5	23.5%
3	Edgewater	Bergen County	New Jersey	2,258	2,415.0	19.6%
4	Cliffside Park	Bergen County	New Jersey	1,797	1,866.0	7.6%
5	Leonia	Bergen County	New Jersey	2,369	1,542.3	26.5%
6	La Palma	Orange County	California	2,587	1,430.9	16.6%
7	Ridgefield	Bergen County	New Jersey	2,835	1,111.3	25.7%
8	Manhattan	New York City	New York	19,683	857.3	1.2%
9	Cerritos	Los Angeles County	California	7,240	829.8	14.8%
10	Cresskill	Bergen County	New Jersey	1,522	737.4	17.8%
11	Great Neck Plaza	Nassau County	New York	220	733.3	3.3%
12	Fullerton	Orange County	California	15,544	695.4	11.5%
13	River Edge	Bergen County	New Jersey	1,264	681.8	11.1%
14	Torrance	Los Angeles County	California	12,092	590.5	8.3%
15	Queens	New York City	New York	64,107	586.8	2.9%
16	Northvale	Bergen County	New Jersey	757	584.6	16.3%
17	Closter	Bergen County	New Jersey	1,771	559.7	21.2%
18	Englewood Cliffs	Bergen County	New Jersey	1,072	513.2	20.3%

== Top ten municipalities as ranked by Korean-American percentage of total population in 2010 ==
Rank	Municipality	County	State	Percentage
1	Palisades Park	Bergen County	New Jersey	53.7% (2022)
2	Leonia	Bergen County	New Jersey	26.5%
3	Ridgefield	Bergen County	New Jersey	25.7%
4	Fort Lee	Bergen County	New Jersey	23.5%
5	Closter	Bergen County	New Jersey	21.2%
6	Englewood Cliffs	Bergen County	New Jersey	20.3%
7	Norwood	Bergen County	New Jersey	20.1%
8	Edgewater	Bergen County	New Jersey	19.6%
9	Cresskill	Bergen County	New Jersey	17.8%
10	Demarest	Bergen County	New Jersey	17.3%

== See also ==
- Koreatown
- Koreatown, Manhattan
- Koreatown, Long Island
- Koreatown, Los Angeles, California
- Koreatown, Palisades Park
- Koreatown, Fort Lee
- List of U.S. cities with Asian American majority populations
- List of U.S. cities with significant Chinese American populations
- History of the Korean Americans in Los Angeles
- Korean Americans in New York City
- Koreans in Chicago
- Korean diaspora
- Tech companies in the New York metropolitan area
