= YKAN =

American nonprofit organization

The young Korean American Network (yKAN) is a 501(c)(3) non-profit, non-partisan organization of 1.5 and 2nd generation Korean-Americans in the New York City area. The organization consists primarily of young professionals from various job industries, as well as academic fields. Members volunteer their time to help promote and advance the Korean-American presence in American society.

== History ==
The young Korean American Network started in 1989 and was officially inaugurated on August 30, 1990 as a 501(c)(3) non-profit, non-partisan organization. Their first president, Michael Han, was a founding member who sought to create the organization as a response to the lack of a networking hub for the Korean-American community in New York.

Since its inauguration, the organization has grown to over 800 members.

== Mission and Objective ==
The organization's mission

... is to elevate Korean-American professionals by fostering educational programs, community service, and networking opportunities. Through these activities yKAN addresses the issues of our community and provides a forum for those who share common experiences and face similar challenges.

The organizations' objectives are to

- Create a professional network to facilitate the even exchange of ideas and common goals among all Korean American professionals
- Foster a professional Korean-American presence in our community by sponsoring educational programs and opportunities
- Promote social awareness and activism through community service
- Foster mutual understanding between Korean-Americans and other ethnic groups
- Promote greater opportunities for the current and future generations of all Korean Americans

== Presidents ==
Year	President
2015-2016	Jin Lim
2011-2015	Edmund Song
2010	Julie Cho
2008–2009	Jisung Chun
2007	Julie Cho
2006	Jaz Park
2005	Kristin Pak
2004	Jayne Jun
2003	Kay Lee
2002	Lisa Yi
2001	Paul Shean
2000	Jimmy Lee
1999	Matthew Kang
1998	Charles Khym
1996–1997	Gary Park
1995	Paul Kim
1993–1994	James Lee
1992	Yongil Shin
1990–1991	Michael Han

== Media coverage ==
yKAN has appeared in the media various times, most notably for their community service events. These appearances include the following:

May 9, 2011 - Bone Marrow and Stem Cell Recruitment Drive. Video from NY1
December 18, 2006 - Milal House Visit. Article from Christian Daily
January 21, 2006 - Anna Erika Adult Home Visit. Scanned article from The Korea Times
January 19, 2006 - Media Coverage of guest speaker, Minya Oh ("aka Miss Info"). Scanned article from The Korea Times
October 29, 2005 - Flu Shot Drive. Scanned article from The Korea Times
September 17, 2005 - Anna Erika Adult Home Visit. Scanned article from The Korea Times
March 21, 2005 - Milal House Visit. Article from The Korea Times
February 15, 2005 - Tsunami Relief Fundraiser Event for the 2004 Tsunami that effected Southeast Asia. Article from The Korea Times
February 11, 2005 - Tsunami Relief Fundraiser Event for the 2004 Tsunami that effected Southeast Asia. Article from The Segye Times
