= Koreatown, Palisades Park =

Populated place in Bergen County, New Jersey, US

Koreatown, Palisades Park Palisades Park Koreatown
- Koreatown
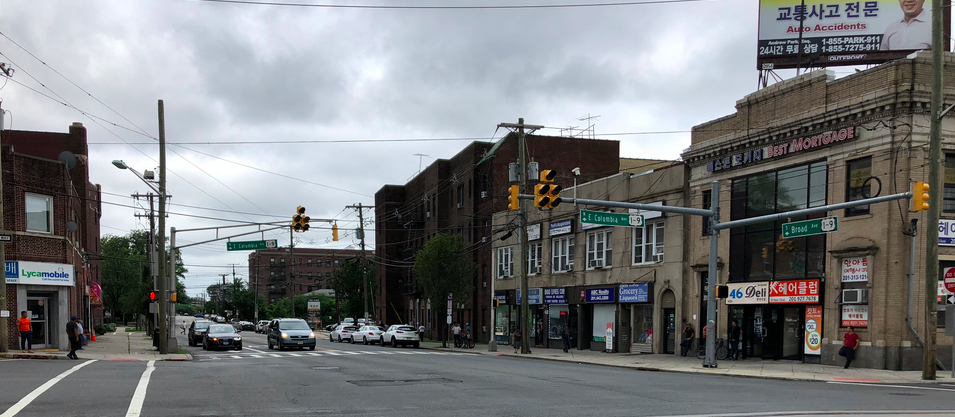
- Koreatown street scene at Broad and Columbia
- Interactive map of Koreatown, Palisades Park
- Coordinates: 40°50′49.26″N 73°59′49.42″W
- Country: United States
- State: New Jersey
- County: Bergen
- Agglomeration: New York City Metropolitan Area
- Borough: Palisades Park

Koreatown in the borough of Palisades Park (Korean: 팰리세이즈파크 코리아타운; shortened to "Pal Park" (팰팍)), Bergen County, in the U.S. state of New Jersey, is centered around the business district on Broad Avenue, which has been called a "Korean food walk of fame".

== Background ==
The municipalities with the highest density of ethnic Koreans in the Western Hemisphere and the home of both the highest Korean-American density and percentage are in Bergen County, with the highest density and percentage, as well as uniquely a majority, of any municipality in the United States, at 53.7% of the borough's population in 2022. Along with Palisades Park, abutting towns also have high percentages: Leonia (26.5%), Ridgefield (25.7%), Fort Lee (23.5%). Chusok Korean Thanksgiving harvest festival has become an annual tradition in Bergen County, attended by several tens of thousands. In the 1990s, a continuous stream of Korean immigrants moved into Palisades Park and purchased most businesses; It became one of the largest and fastest growing ethnic Korean enclaves outside of Korea (and has been called Koreatown on the Hudson, the Korean Village, and Little Korea). Broad Avenue is the biggest and densest Korean commercial district in Bergen County, the heart of the Korean American community, and growth of the community has been accelerated by zoning laws which allow duplex homes on land previously containing a single home.

== Cuisine and culture ==
Broad Avenue in Koreatown has been referred to as a "Korean food walk of fame", with diverse offerings. Palisades Park's Koreatown now incorporates the highest concentration of Korean restaurants within a one-mile radius in the United States, and Broad Avenue has evolved into a Korean dessert destination as well. Korean Chinese cuisine is now also available in Koreatown, as is misugaru. Bulgogi and galbi are staples on Broad Avenue in the Palisades Park Koreatown. Korean cafés have become a major cultural element within Palisades Park's Koreatown, not only for the coffee, bingsu (shaved ice), and pastries, but also as communal gathering places. Koreatown in Palisades Park has emerged as a dominant nexus of Korean American culture. The Palisades Park Senior Citizens Center provides a popular gathering place where even Korean grandmothers were noted to follow the dance trend of the worldwide viral hit Gangnam Style by South Korean "K-pop" rapper Psy in 2012. Palisades Park High School has hosted national Kumdo martial arts tournaments. A jjimjilbang offers saunas and bibimbap in Palisades Park's Koreatown. Approximately 120 Korean stores were counted in Palisades Park in 2000, a number which has risen significantly since then, featuring restaurants and karaoke (noraebang) bars, grocery markets, education centers, book stores, financial institutions (such as Shinhan Bank and Woori Bank), offices, electronics vendors, apparel boutiques, and other commercial enterprises. Koreatown has also grown in and introduced Pocha to the community, which is just another word for a bar, but pochas have a different style.

=== Signage and dual-naming Broad Avenue ===
In 1996, an ordinance was passed that storefront signage be same size in English as in Korean. It was one of seven towns in Bergen County to do so.

In mid-2015, a proposal was submitted by the Korean-American Association of Palisades Park to the mayor and council of Palisades Park to add a second name to Broad Avenue, such as "Korean Market Street" (Meokjagolmok) or "Korea Way". The mayor's response was to request a public vote on implementing this addition. As of 2018, it remained controversial.

=== Monuments and memorials ===
In 2010, in a public park near the public library a brass plaque on a block of stone, was dedicated to the memory of comfort women, tens of thousands of women and girls, many Korean, who were forced into sexual slavery by Japanese soldiers during World War II. In May 2012, borough officials in Palisades Park rejected requests by two diplomatic delegations from Japan to remove a small monument from the park. Days later, a South Korean delegation endorsed the borough's decision. The first Japanese delegation cited apologies offered by their country's government for its involvement as justifying the removal of the monument, while officials from the second delegation controversially claimed that "comfort women were a lie". In 2017 the monument, the first of its kind in the United States, was relocated to more prominent location. A similar memorial in nearby Hackensack was raised behind the Bergen County Courthouse, alongside memorials to the Holocaust, the Great Famine of Ireland, and the Armenian genocide, and unveiled in March 2013. An annual cross-country bicycle ride dedicated to the honor of the comfort women ends at the Palisades Park memorial, following a penultimate stop at the memorial in Hackensack.

A memorial dedicated to the victims of the tragic sinking of the Sewol ferry off the South Korean coast on April 16, 2014, was unveiled at the public library in May 2014.

== Korean language in civic affairs ==
Ballots are printed with the Korean language since 2012. Jason Kim was serving as deputy mayor of the borough of Palisades Park in May 2012. As of May 2014, Korean Americans had garnered at least four borough council seats in Bergen County. In July 2015, Shawn M. Lee was sworn in as Palisades Park's first Korean-American police sergeant and Gina S. Kim was sworn in as the borough's first municipal clerk, reflecting the growing political influence of the Korean American population in Palisades Park. In November 2015, Palisades Park hired two more Korean-speaking police officers, bringing the total to four. In January 2019, Christopher Chung was sworn in as the first Korean-American mayor of Palisades Park. Korean Americans have attended town meetings in large numbers, requested Korean language interpreters to be present at these meetings as of August 2016. In 2019 the town created a Korean language version of its website.

== See also ==
- Koreans in New York City
- Korean diaspora
- Koreatown, Cherry Hill (체리힐 필라델피아)
- Koreatown, Fort Lee (포트 리 코리아타운)
- Koreatown, Manhattan (맨해튼 코리아타운)
- Koreatown, Long Island (롱 아일랜드 코리아타운)
- Koreatown, Philadelphia (필라델피아 한국 도시)
- Koreatown (코리아타운)
- List of U.S. cities with significant Korean-American populations
