= Urban oasis =

Open space surrounded by a town

An urban oasis is a public open space, park, or plaza which is located in between buildings or formed by surrounding buildings in an urban setting. It can exist in any kind of culture. There are various sizes of urban oases. Central Park, Frederick Law Olmsted's park in New York City, can be considered as a very large urban oasis. The Los Angeles Central Library’s plaza can be considered to be a small scaled oasis.

The oasis is used by residents, workers, and visitors during everyday activities. The urban oasis offers many benefits to the community by inviting people to stop, sit, eat, play, and relax. Plant material provides shade and screens the noise of vehicular traffic while fountains help to drown out the noise pollution. The oasis adds value to cities and neighborhoods while providing identity, economic benefit, environmental benefit, and a site for cultural activities in cities.

== Role in the community ==
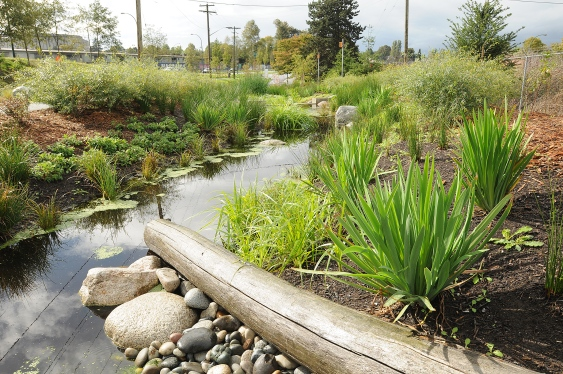
Hastings Creek, Vancouver

Identity is one of the most significant roles of an urban oasis. Great public icons like Rockefeller Center's ice-skating rink, and Central Park’s woodlands, open fields, and fountains are good examples of identifiable places in New York City. Both are well known and visited often, allowing tourists and residents to take advantage of an urban oasis.

Another role of the urban oasis is to provide economic benefit to the community. Land values in a city are considerably affected by parks and surrounding attractions. The highest land values in New York City tend to be around Bryant Park, Central Park, and Gramercy Park. The green-market has been a major catalyst in revitalizing the surrounding neighborhoods. Parks revitalize streets for walking, gathering, and shopping and provide economic benefits to a city.

Plaza-like urban oasis features provide settings for cultural activities like farmers' markets, art galleries, and music events. They not only provide for cultural activities, but plazas also provide economic activity to the communities. One good example is the WaterFire night event in Providence, Rhode Island. During the summer and early fall, bonfires are placed just above the surface of the three rivers that pass through the middle of downtown Providence, which give out pleasing smells of aromatic wood. This, combined with live music, creates a public cultural event that brings people into a central urban area after dark while engaging the senses and emotions of those who stroll the paths and bridges of Waterplace Park.

== Environment ==
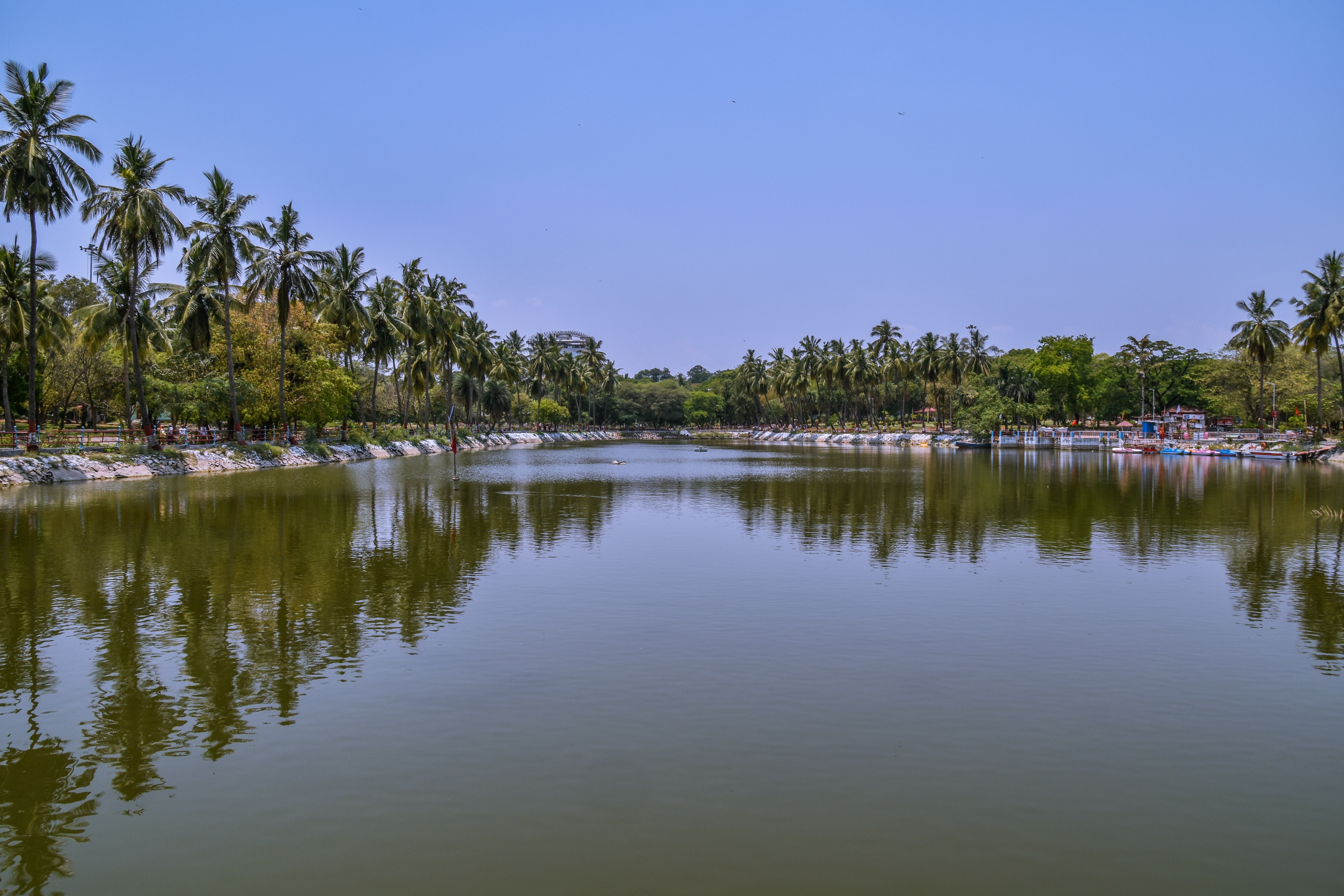
Indira Park, Hyderabad, India

Environmental benefits including the perception of a landscape as naturally beautiful, increasing plant reliability and decreasing costs, improving planting success, richer living environment, or preventing habitats, are gained from urban oases. Our appreciation of the natural environment is enhanced by vegetative parks that add open spaces and create animal and bird habitat areas. Central Park is a significant example, as it lends enormous environmental benefits to New York City.

== See also ==
- Oasis effect
- Urban heat island
