= Koreatown, Manhattan =

Neighborhood in New York City

- Neighborhood of Manhattan
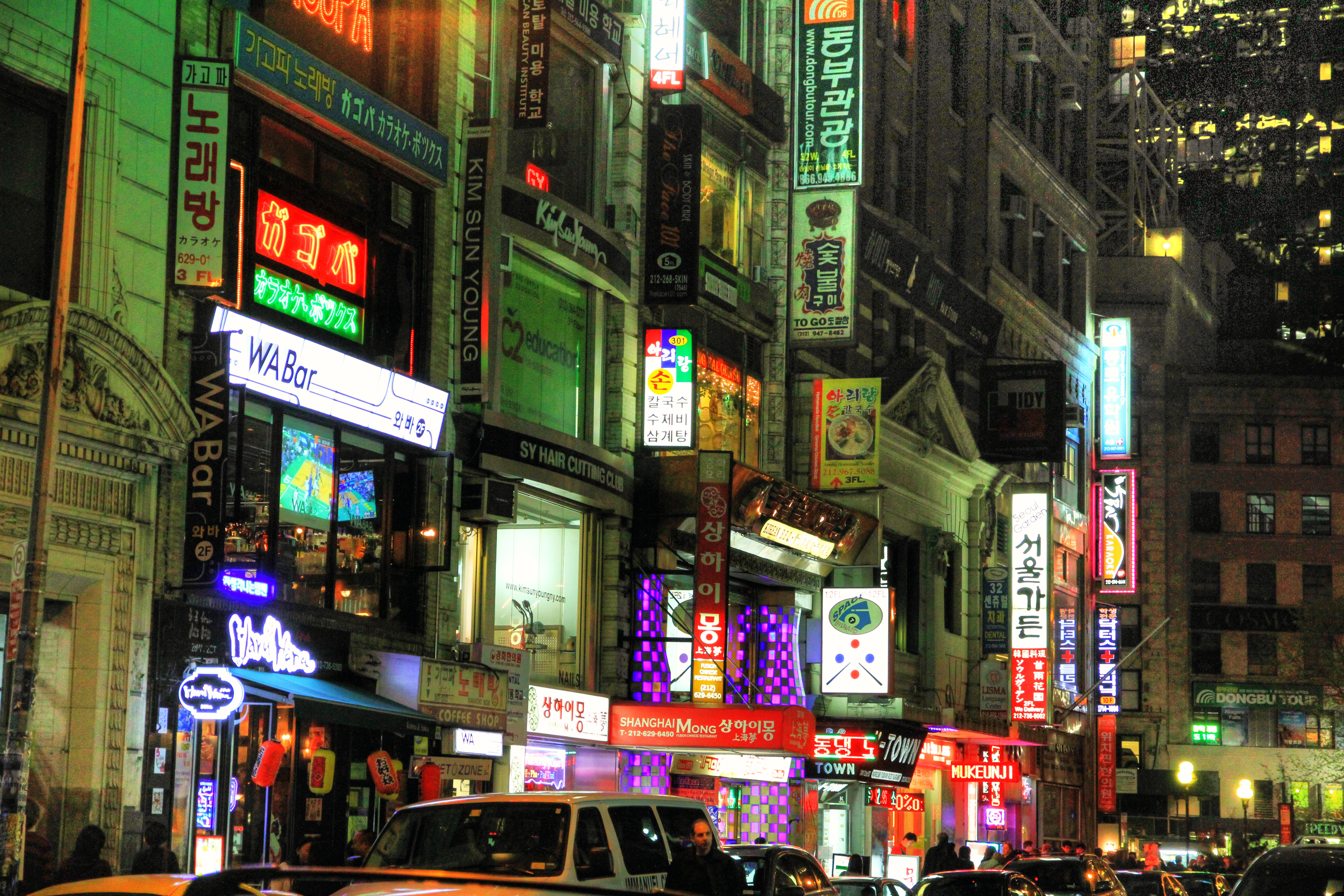
- Koreatown at night (2013)
- Interactive map of Koreatown, Manhattan
- Coordinates: 40.747°N 73.987°W
- Country: United States
- State: New York
- City: New York City
- Borough: Manhattan

Koreatown (Korean: 코리아타운), shortened to K-Town, is a Korean enclave in Midtown Manhattan, New York City, centered on 32nd Street between Madison Avenue and the intersection with Sixth Avenue and Broadway, which is known as Greeley Square. The neighborhood in Midtown South features over 150 businesses of various types and sizes, ranging from small restaurants and beauty salons to large branches of Korean banking conglomerates. Koreatown, Manhattan, has become described as the "Korean Times Square" and has emerged as the international economic outpost for the Korean chaebol.

== History ==
Historically, Manhattan's Koreatown has been part of the Garment District. In the 1980s, a Korean bookstore and a handful of restaurants were founded in the area. Their success drew other Korean-owned businesses, sustained by increased immigration from Korea and the high levels of tourist traffic stemming from nearby Midtown Manhattan landmarks like the Empire State Building, Macy's Herald Square, the United Nations headquarters, Penn Station, Madison Square Garden, the Garment District, and the Flower District. Today, Koreatown is primarily a Korean business district, but Japanese businesses have also emerged, and the resident Korean and Japanese populations in the area have grown as well. More broadly, Koreatown is attracting new Korean residents to the adjacent Manhattan neighborhoods of Murray Hill, Kips Bay, and Rose Hill. The world's largest international Korean Pride Festival was inaugurated in Koreatown, Manhattan in October 2022 and has been growing on an annual basis.

== Demographics ==
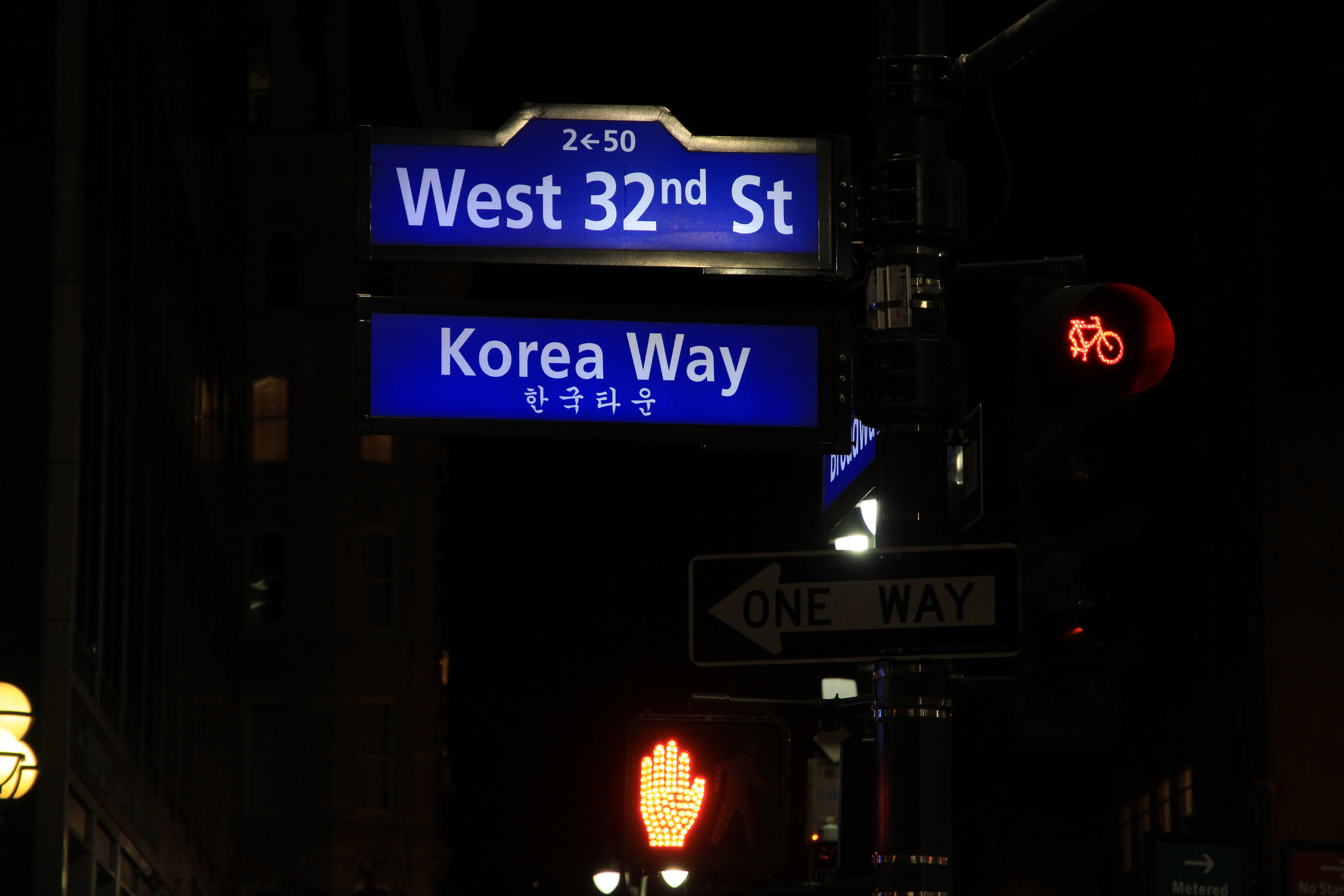
The Korea Way sign illuminated at night, with Hangul translation

From 2000 to 2010, the Korean population of Manhattan (co-extensive with New York County) nearly doubled, to about 20,000, according to the 2010 United States census. Along with the Koreatowns in nearby Bergen County, New Jersey (in Palisades Park and Fort Lee) and Long Island (extending eastward from Flushing, Queens) in New York City, Manhattan's Koreatown serves as the cultural nexus for an overall Korean American population of 218,764 people in the New York City Metropolitan Area, the second-largest population of ethnic Koreans outside of Korea.

== Korea Way ==
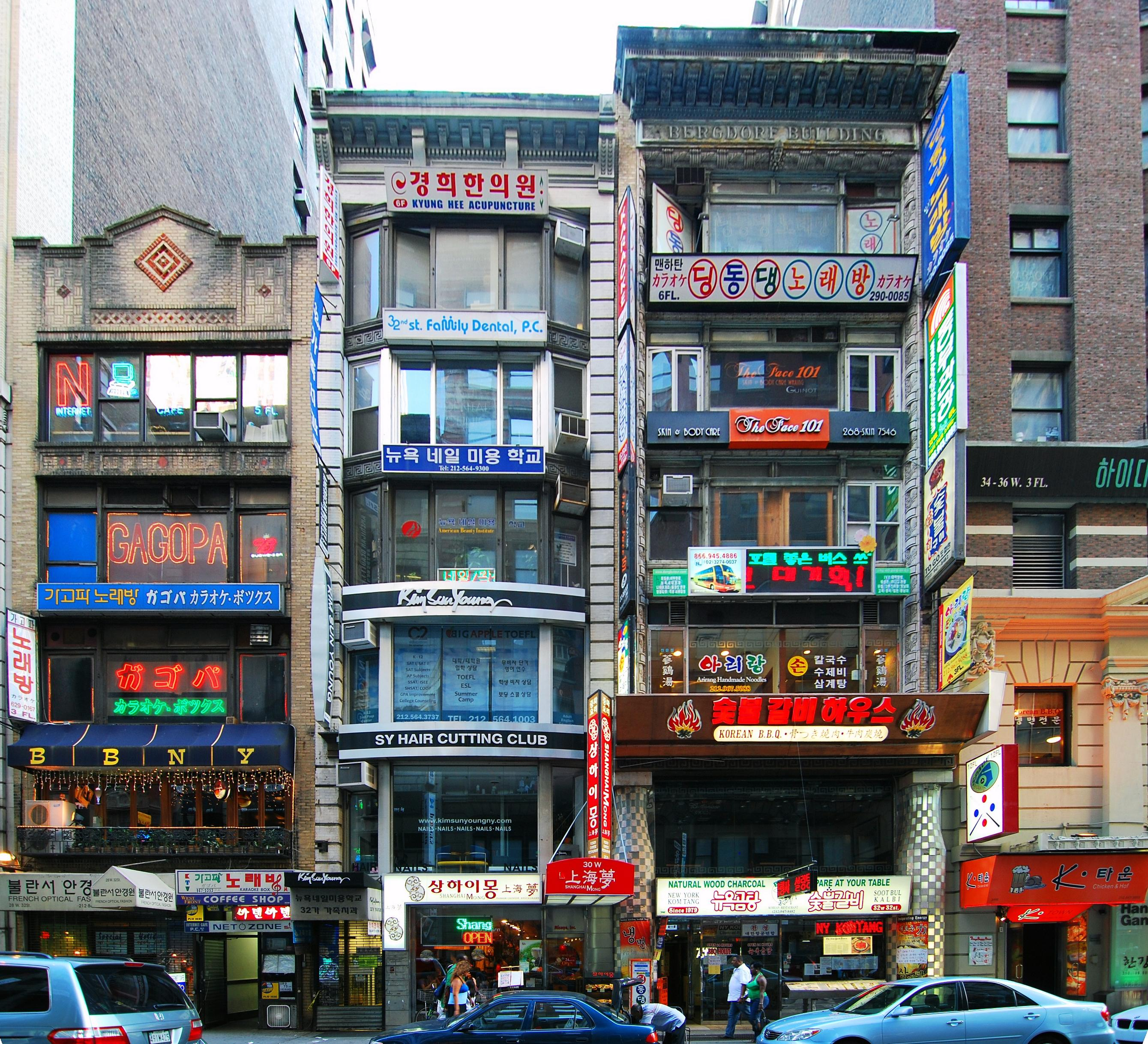
"Korea Way" on West 32nd Street in Manhattan's Koreatown

The heart of Koreatown is the segment of 32nd Street between Fifth Avenue and Sixth Avenue, officially nicknamed Korea Way. Korea Way features stores and restaurants on multiple stories, with independently run establishments reaching up to higher floors, exuding an ambience of Seoul itself. The New York City Korean Chamber of Commerce estimates there to be more than 100 small and larger businesses on Korea Way. Signage in Hangul is ubiquitous. Koreatown's central location and high density of crowded restaurants, bars, karaoke clubs, boutiques, and spas on Korea Way have rendered it a major tourist attraction and a center of nightlife in Manhattan.

Korea Way features numerous restaurants that serve both traditional and/or regional Korean cuisine and Korean fusion fare (including Korean Chinese cuisine), several bakeries, grocery stores, supermarkets, bookstores, consumer electronics outlets, video rental shops, hair and nail salons, noraebang singing bars, nightclubs, as well as cell phone service providers, internet cafés, doctors' offices, attorney offices, banks, and hotels. Numerous Japanese restaurants have also emerged in Manhattan's Koreatown. Although Korea Way continues to represent the heart of Koreatown, situated between Broadway, Sixth Avenue, and Fifth Avenue, Koreatown itself as of 2015 has been expanding further eastward from Fifth Avenue along East 32nd Street, toward Madison Avenue in Midtown Manhattan, in the direction of Queens and Nassau County.

== Development as a Korean dining destination ==
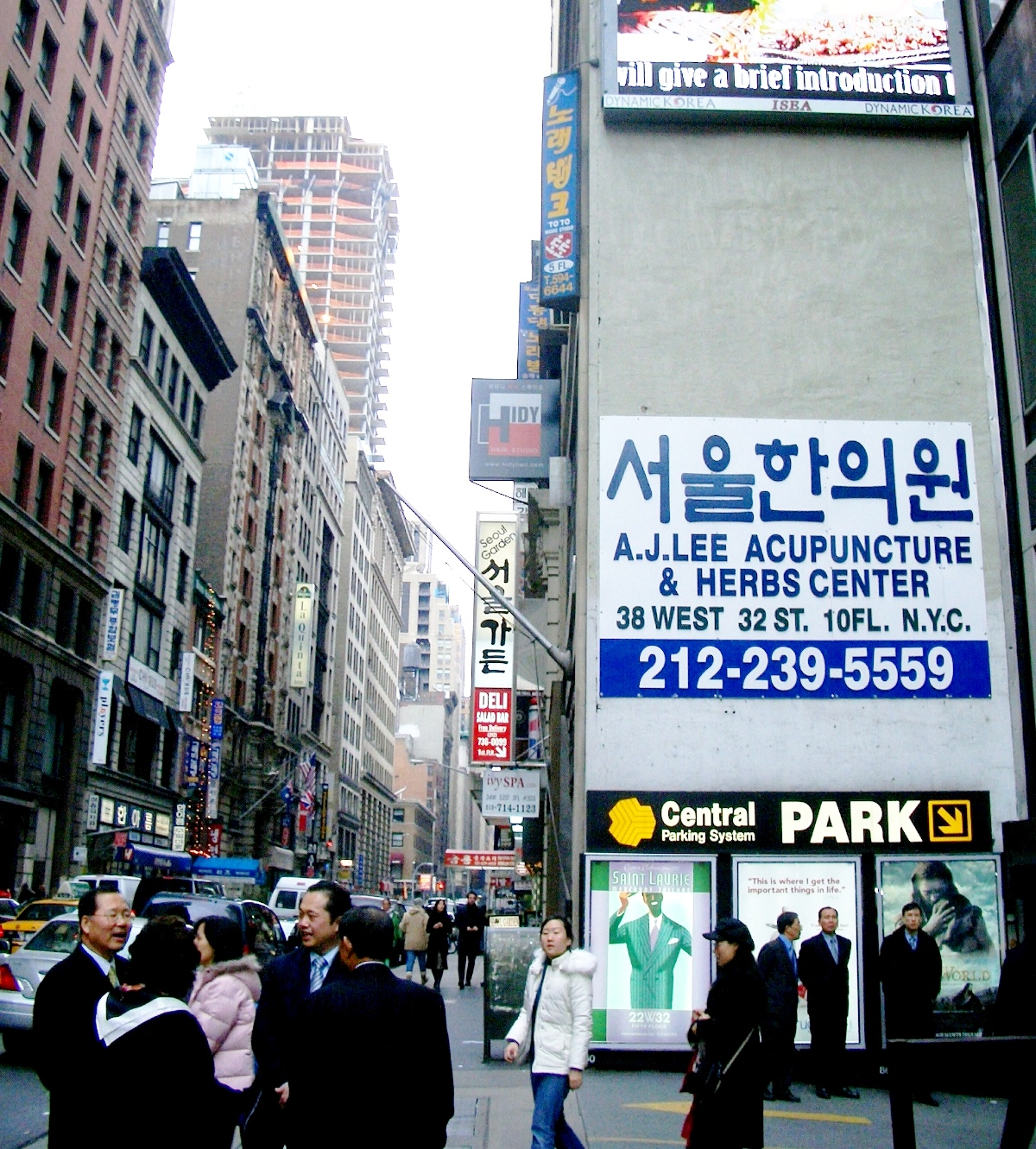
Congregating in Koreatown

Some 24/7 restaurants conduct business on Korea Way. Korean restaurants in the district have had to expand or stay open around the clock to meet rising commercial rents and stay financially viable, given the growing customer volume generated by foot traffic in and greater investment and involvement by the Korean chaebol. Manhattan's Koreatown, historically known as a more tourist-oriented alternative to Flushing and Murray Hill, Queens (part of the Long Island Koreatown), has since developed a reputation as an authentic Korean dining destination.

== See also ==
- Koreans in New York City
- Korean diaspora
- List of U.S. cities with significant Korean American populations
- Midtown South

Other Koreatowns in the New York City region:

- Koreatown, Fort Lee
- Koreatown, Queens
- Koreatown, Palisades Park
