= Koreans =

East Asian ethnic group

한민족 • 조선민족

Total population
- c. 82 million

Regions with significant populations
- South Korea c. 51,106,229 (2026) (Note: In 2026, 95.1% of South Korea population was South Korean by nationality and 4.9% were of foreign nationality. South Korea is thus considered one of the most ethnically homogeneous societies in the world. Precise number of ethnic Koreans specifically is difficult to estimate since South Korean statistics do not record ethnicity. Furthermore, many immigrants are repatriated ethnic Koreans themselves while unknown number of South Korean citizens are not ethnically Korean which skews any statistical estimate. Some of the largest groups of immigrants are ethnic Koreans from China (Joseonjok), Japan (Zainichi) and the former Soviet Union (Koryo-saram).); North Korea 26,298,666 (2024) (Note: Due to the country's isolationist policies, North Korea is presumed to be almost entirely homogeneous.); Diaspora as of 2021 c. 7.3 million
- United States: 2,633,777
- China: 2,350,422 (Note: This includes South Korean and North Korean people in China. Korean with Chinese citizenship is referred to in China as Joseonjok in Korean and Chaoxianzu in Mandarin Chinese.)
- Japan: 818,865 (Note: Referred to in Japan as Zainichi in Japanese.)
- Canada: 237,364
- Uzbekistan: 175,865 (Note: Koreans of Uzbekistan are part of the wider Koryo-saram identity.)
- Russia: 168,526 (Note: Koreans of Russia are part of the wider Koryo-saram identity.)
- Australia: 158,103
- Vietnam: 156,330
- Kazakhstan: 109,495 (Note: Koreans of Kazkahstan are part of the wider Koryo-saram identity.)
- Germany: 50,000-100,000
- United Kingdom: 40,000-45,000
- Brazil: 40,000-50,000
- New Zealand: 33,812
- Philippines: 33,032
- France: 30,000-35,000
- Argentina: 22,847
- Singapore: 20,983
- Thailand: 18,130
- Kyrgyzstan: 18,106
- Indonesia: 17,297
- Malaysia: 13,667
- Ukraine: 13,524 (Note: Koreans of Ukraine are part of the wider Koryo-saram identity.)
- Hong Kong: 13,288
- Sweden: 13,055
- Guatemala: 12,918
- Mexico: 11,107
- India: 10,674
- Cambodia: 10,608
- Netherlands: 9,473
- United Arab Emirates: 9,227
- Denmark: 8,694
- Norway: 7,744
- Paraguay: 5,205
- Saudi Arabia: 5,189
- Taiwan: 5,132
- Guam: 5,016
- Italy: 5,000
- Belgium: 5,000
- Spain: 4,080
- Switzerland: 4,000
- Brunei: 3,927 (Note: As of 2023, the number of Koreans living in Brunei was reported to be 156, reflecting a shared interest in various sectors including business, education, and tourism.)
- South Africa: 3,300
- Qatar: 3,000
- Austria: 3,000
- Czechia: 3,000
- Turkey: 2,686
- Chile: 2,510
- Mongolia: 2,284
- Northern Marianas: 2,281
- Hungary Peru: 2,000; 1,305

Languages
- Korean, Jeju and Korean Sign Language minorities

Religion
- Predominantly: Irreligious; Significant: Korean shamanic, Christian, and Buddhist

Related ethnic groups
- Jejuans

Koreans (Note: South Korean: 한민족/한국인/한국사람, 韓民族/韓國人/韓國사람, Han minjok (Han ethnic group), Hanguk-in (persons of the Han country), Hanguksaram (Han country people), North Korean: 조선민족/조선인/조선사람, 朝鮮民族/朝鮮人/朝鮮사람, Joseon minjok (Korean ethnic group), Joseon-in (Joseon persons)/Joseonsaram (Joseon people); see Names of Korea) are an East Asian ethnic group indigenous to the Korean Peninsula. The majority of Koreans live in the two Korean sovereign states of North and South Korea, which are collectively referred to as Korea. As of 2021, an estimated 7.3 million ethnic Koreans resided outside of Korea. Koreans are also an officially recognised ethnic minority in other several Continental and East Asian countries, including China, Japan, Kazakhstan, Russia, and Uzbekistan. Outside of Continental and East Asia, sizeable Korean communities have formed in Germany, the United Kingdom, France, the United States, Canada, Australia, and New Zealand.

== Etymology ==
South Koreans refer to themselves as Hanguk-in (Note: 한국인; 韓國人) or Hanguk-saram, both of which mean "people of the Han". The "Han" in the names of the Korean Empire, Daehan Jeguk, and the Republic of Korea (South Korea), Daehan Minguk or Hanguk, are named in reference to the Three Kingdoms of Korea, not the ancient confederacies in the southern Korean Peninsula. Members of the Korean diaspora often use the term Han-in. (Note: 한인; 韓人; lit. 'people of Han')

North Koreans refer to themselves as Joseon-in (Note: 조선인; 朝鮮人) or Joseon-saram, both of which literally mean "people of Joseon". The term is derived from Joseon, the last dynastic kingdom of Korea. Similarly, Koreans in China refer to themselves as Chaoxianzu (Note: Chinese: 朝鲜族) in Chinese or Joseonjok, Joseonsaram (Note: Korean: 조선족, 조선사람) in Korean, which are cognates that literally mean "Joseon ethnic group". Koreans in Japan refer to themselves as Zainichi Chōsenjin, Chōsenjin (Note: 在日朝鮮人, 朝鮮人, Zainichi Chōsenjin, Chōsenjin) in Japanese or Jaeil Joseonin, Joseonsaram, Joseonin (Note: Korean: 재일조선인, 조선사람, 조선인) in Korean. Ethnic Koreans living in Russia and Central Asia refer to themselves as Koryo-saram, (Note: Korean: 고려 사람; Cyrillic: Корё сарам) alluding to Goryeo, a Korean dynasty spanning from 918 to 1392, which also spawned the word 'Korea'.

In the chorus of the South Korean national anthem, Koreans are referred to as Daehan-saram ("people of the great han"). (Note: Korean: 대한사람, lit. 'People of Great Han')

In an inter-Korean context, such as when dealing with the Koreanic languages or the Korean ethnicity as a whole, South Koreans use the term 'Hangyeore'. (Note: Korean: 한겨레; RR: Hangyeore; MR: Han'gyŏre, lit. 'nations/people of Han')

== Origins ==
The origin of Koreans has not been well clarified yet. Based on linguistic, archaeologic and genetic evidence, their place of origin is located somewhere in Northeast Asia, but their exact pattern of expansion and arrival into the Korean peninsula remain unclear.

Archaeological evidence suggests that Proto-Koreans were migrants from Manchuria during the Bronze Age. The origins of the Korean language and people are subjects of ongoing debate. Some theories suggest connections to the Altaic region, proposing links with languages and populations in Northern Asia, including Mongolic, Turkic, and Tungusic groups. However, these claims remain inconclusive, and many scholars argue that Korean belongs to its own distinct Koreanic family, with unique linguistic and cultural origins.

Scholars suggest that Koreanic speakers came from Northeast Asia and migrated southwards to the Korean Peninsula, where they replaced or assimilated the local Japonic speakers. Whitman suggests that the Proto-Koreans arrived in the southern part of the Korean Peninsula at around 300 BCE and coexisted with the descendants of the Japonic Mumun cultivators (or assimilated them). Vovin suggests Proto-Korean is equivalent to the variant of Koreanic languages spoken in southern Manchuria and northern Korean Peninsula by the time of the Three Kingdoms of Korea period and spread to southern Korea through influence from Goguryeo migrants. The arrival of early Koreans can be associated with the Bronze Age dagger culture, which expanded from the West Liao River region. Archaeologic evidence points to a connection between the pottery-making style of the Late Neolithic to Bronze Age cultures in the West Liao River basin and the Korean Peninsula. Miyamoto similarly argues that Proto-Koreanic arrived with the "rolled rim vessel culture" (Jeomtodae culture) from the Liaodong Peninsula, gradually replacing the Japonic speakers of the Mumun-Yayoi culture.

However, some scholars reject the notion that the Korean speakers were not native to the Korean Peninsula, and argue that no solid evidence of such linguistic migration/shift as well as population and material change has ever been found to support later migrations.

The largest concentration of dolmens in the world is found on the Korean Peninsula. In fact, with an estimated 35,000-100,000 dolmens, Korea accounts for nearly 40% of the world's total. Similar dolmens can be found in Northeast China, the Shandong Peninsula and the island of Kyushu, yet it is unclear why this culture only flourished so extensively on the Korean Peninsula and its surroundings compared to the bigger remainder of Northeast Asia.

=== Genetics ===
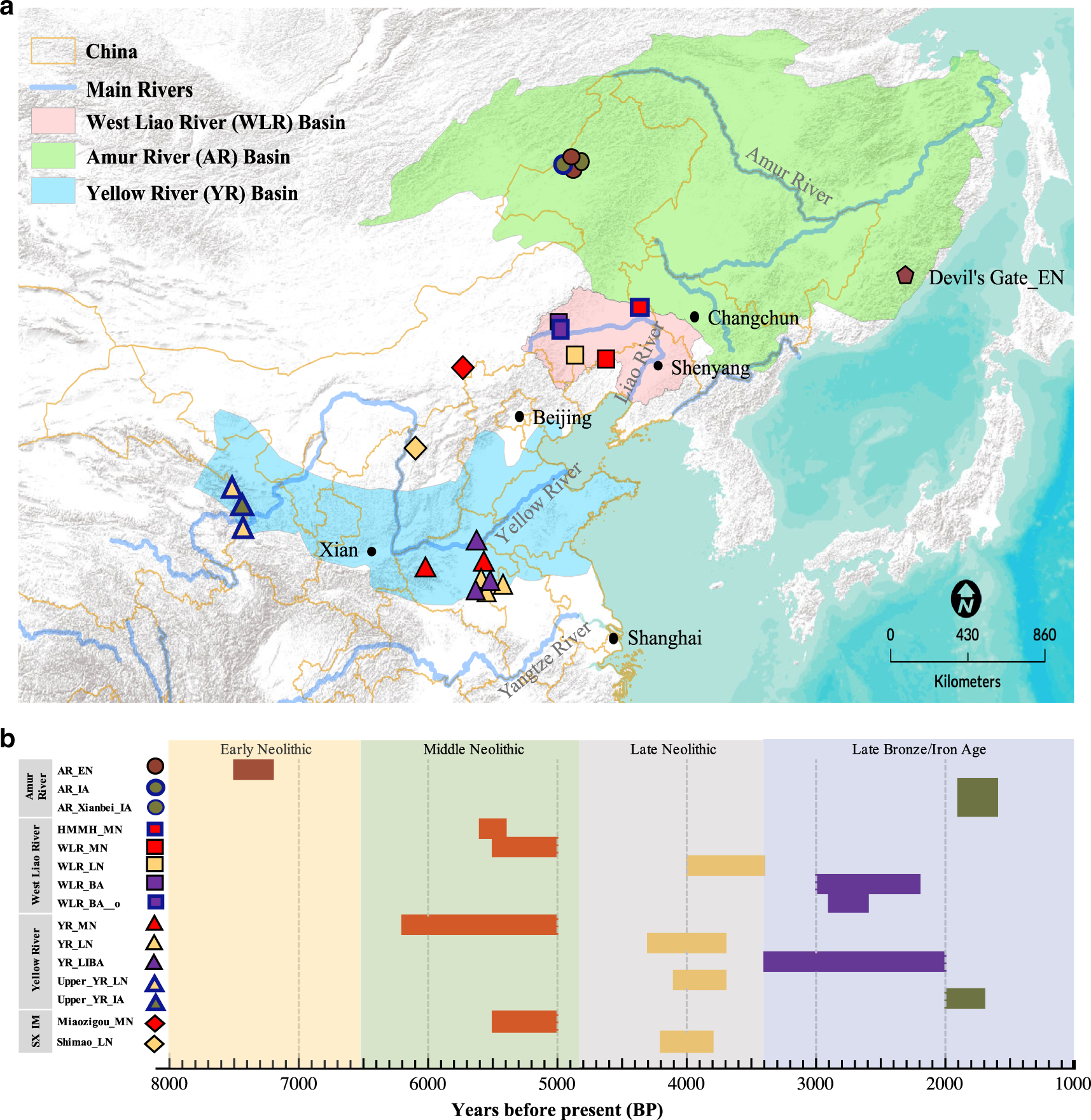
Geographic location and dates of ancient individuals in Northeast Asia. The Bronze Age West Liao River farmers (WLR_BA) display long-term genetic continuity with modern Koreans.

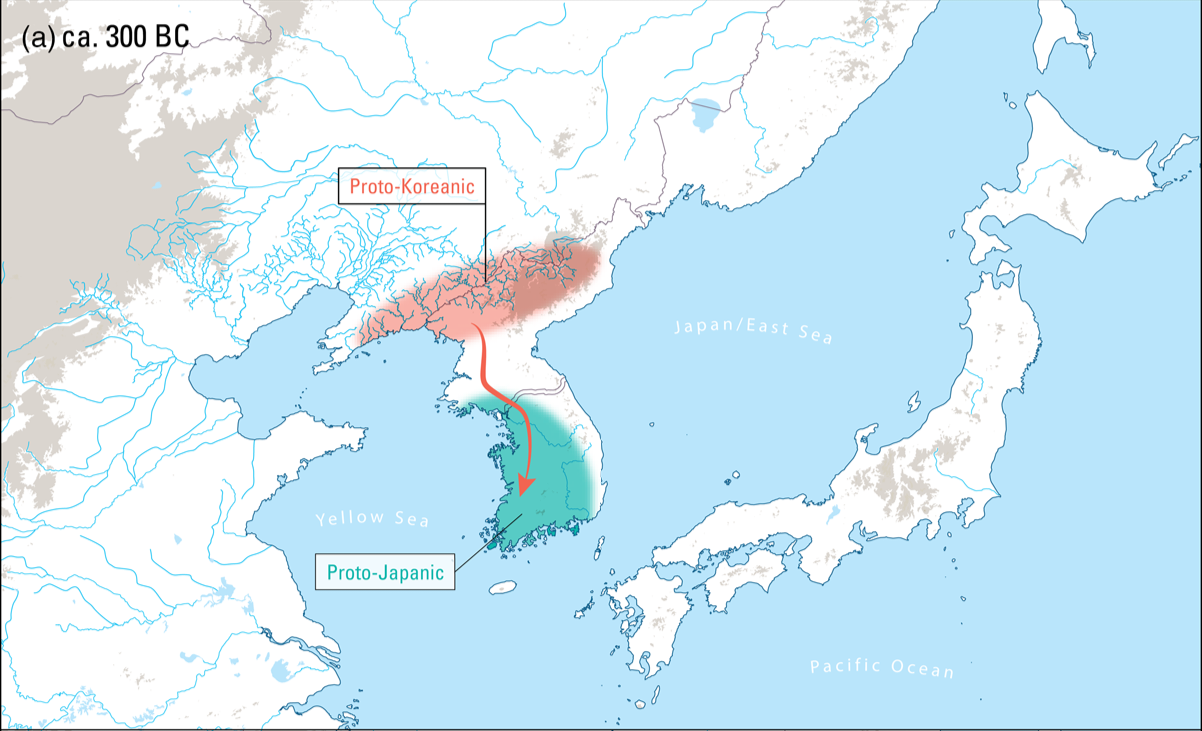
Proto-Macro-Koreanic arrived after Proto-Japonic from Liaodong and the Changbaishan region with the introduction of bronze daggers around 300 BC.

According to Sun et al., modern Koreans primarily descend from Bronze Age farmers from the West Liao River. These farmers can be modelled as having Ancient Northern East Asian ancestry, related to Yellow River farmers from the Middle to Late Neolithic period, and Ancient Northeast Asian ancestry, related to Amur hunter-gatherers. West Liao River ancestry is associated with the Upper Xiajiadian culture, which can represent the ancestral source for Bronze Age and modern Koreans. According to Kim et al. (2020), most genetic variation within modern Koreans is attributed to the introduction of combined Vat Komnou and Nui Nap ancestries from Southern China after the Bronze Age. Other studies also show this Southeast Asian contribution in Proto-Koreans. Sun et al. models modern Koreans as having Bronze Age West Liao River ancestry (100%) or a mixture of Bronze Age West Liao River (85%) and Taiwan Hanben ancestries (15%). Wang and Wang (2022) states that Koreans from the Neolithic to the Three Kingdoms Period, a span covering roughly 6000 BC to AD 500, have Jōmon ancestry, which ranged from 10% to 95%, and significantly contributed to the genetic makeup of modern Koreans. But subsequent arrivals of newcomers from Manchuria 'diluted' this Jōmon ancestry and made the Koreans genetically homogenous. Because of this, Koreans are closely related to Korea TK_1 individuals, who additionally exhibit affinities with Eastern Chinese, due to their lower Jōmon ancestry. Other studies suggest close affinities between modern Koreans and the Doigahama Yayoi individual, who are closely related to ancient (e.g. Yayoi, Kofun etc.) and modern Japanese populations. Jōmon ancestry in modern Koreans is also estimated to be about 5%. One study suggests genetic differentiation among modern Koreans, with Jejuans being more related to modern Japanese than mainland Koreans.

Koreans display high frequencies of the Y-DNA haplogroups O2-M122 (approximately 40% of all present-day Korean males), O1b2-M176 (approximately 30%), and C2-M217 (approximately 15%). Some regional variance may exist; in a study of South Korean Y-DNA published in 2011, the ratio of O2-M122 to O1b2-M176 is greatest in Seoul-Gyeonggi (1.8065), with the ratio declining in a counterclockwise direction around South Korea (Chungcheong 1.6364, Jeolla 1.3929, Jeju 1.3571, Gyeongsang 1.2400, Gangwon 0.9600). Haplogroup C2-M217 tends to be found in about 13% of males from most regions of South Korea, but it is somewhat more common (about 17%) among males from the Gyeongsang region in the southeast of the peninsula and somewhat less common (about 7%) among males from Jeju, located off the southwest coast of the peninsula. Haplogroup C2-M217 has been found in a greater proportion (about 26%) of a small sample (n=19) of males from North Korea. Koreans have also been identified as belonging to the C2b1a1 sublineage specifically, indicating shared ancestry with Han and Mongolic-speaking populations on the paternal line. However, haplogroups are not a reliable indicator of an individual's overall ancestry; Koreans are more similar to one another in regard to their autosomes than they are similar to members of other ethnic groups. Studies of polymorphisms in the human Y-chromosome have so far produced evidence to suggest that the Korean people have a long history as a distinct, mostly endogamous ethnic group, with successive prehistoric waves of people moving to the peninsula and two major Y-chromosome haplogroups. The mitochondrial DNA markers (mtDNA haplogroups and HVR-I sequences) of Korean populations showed close relationships with Manchurians, Japanese, Mongolians and Northern Chinese but not with Southeast Asians. Y-chromosomal distances showed a close relationship to most East Asian population groups, including Southeast Asian ones.

Koreans share a close genetic relationship with Yamato Japanese and Manchu populations, as well as other Tungusic-speaking groups, reflecting shared ancestry and historical interactions. Additionally, they exhibit genetic affinity with Northern Han Chinese populations, though to a lesser degree compared to Manchu and Japanese populations. These relationships are supported by genome-wide analyses highlighting the complex genetic structure of East Asian populations. Among Han Chinese, Koreans are closely related to Han Chinese from Inner Mongolia, Northeastern China (e.g. Liaoning, Shandong etc.) and Shaanxi. The study "Genomic insights into the formation of human populations in East Asia" states that Koreans are genetically closest to Yamato Japanese based on FST genetic distance measurements. The research highlights the complex genetic structure of East Asian populations, shaped by historical migrations and admixture events. The reference population for Koreans used in Geno 2.0 Next Generation is 94% Eastern Asia and 5% Southeast Asia & Oceania.

=== Genealogy ===
Korea Foundation Associate Professor of History, Eugene Y. Park said that many Koreans seem to have a genealogical memory blackout before the twentieth century. According to him the vast majority of Koreans do not know their actual genealogical history. Through "inventing tradition" in the seventeenth and eighteenth centuries, families devised a kind of master narrative story that purports to explain a surname-ancestral seat combination's history to the extent where it is next to impossible to look beyond these master narrative stories. He gave an example of what "inventing tradition" was like from his own family's genealogy where a document from 1873 recorded three children in a particular family and a later 1920 document recorded an extra son in that same family. Park said that these master narratives connect the same surname and ancestral seat to a single, common ancestor. This trend became universal in the nineteenth century, but genealogies which were published in the seventeenth century actually admit that they did not know how the different lines of the same surname or ancestral seat are related at all. Only a small percentage of Koreans had surnames and ancestral seats to begin with, and that the rest of the Korean population had adopted these surname and ancestral seat identities within the last two to three hundred years.

== Culture ==
North Korea and South Korea share a common heritage, but the political division since 1945 has resulted in some divergence of their modern cultures.

== Language ==
The language of the Korean people is the Korean language, which uses Hangul, invented by Sejong the Great, as its main writing system. Daily usage of Hanja has been phased out in Korean peninsula other than usage by some South Korean newspapers and media companies when referring to key politicians (e.g. current and former Presidents, leaders of major political parties) or handful of countries (e.g. China, Japan, Canada, United States, United Kingdom) as an abbreviation. Otherwise, Hanja is exclusively used for academic, historical and religious purposes. Roman alphabet is the de facto secondary writing system in South Korea especially for loan words and is widely used in day-to-day and official communication. There are more than 78 million speakers of the Korean language worldwide.

== Demographics ==
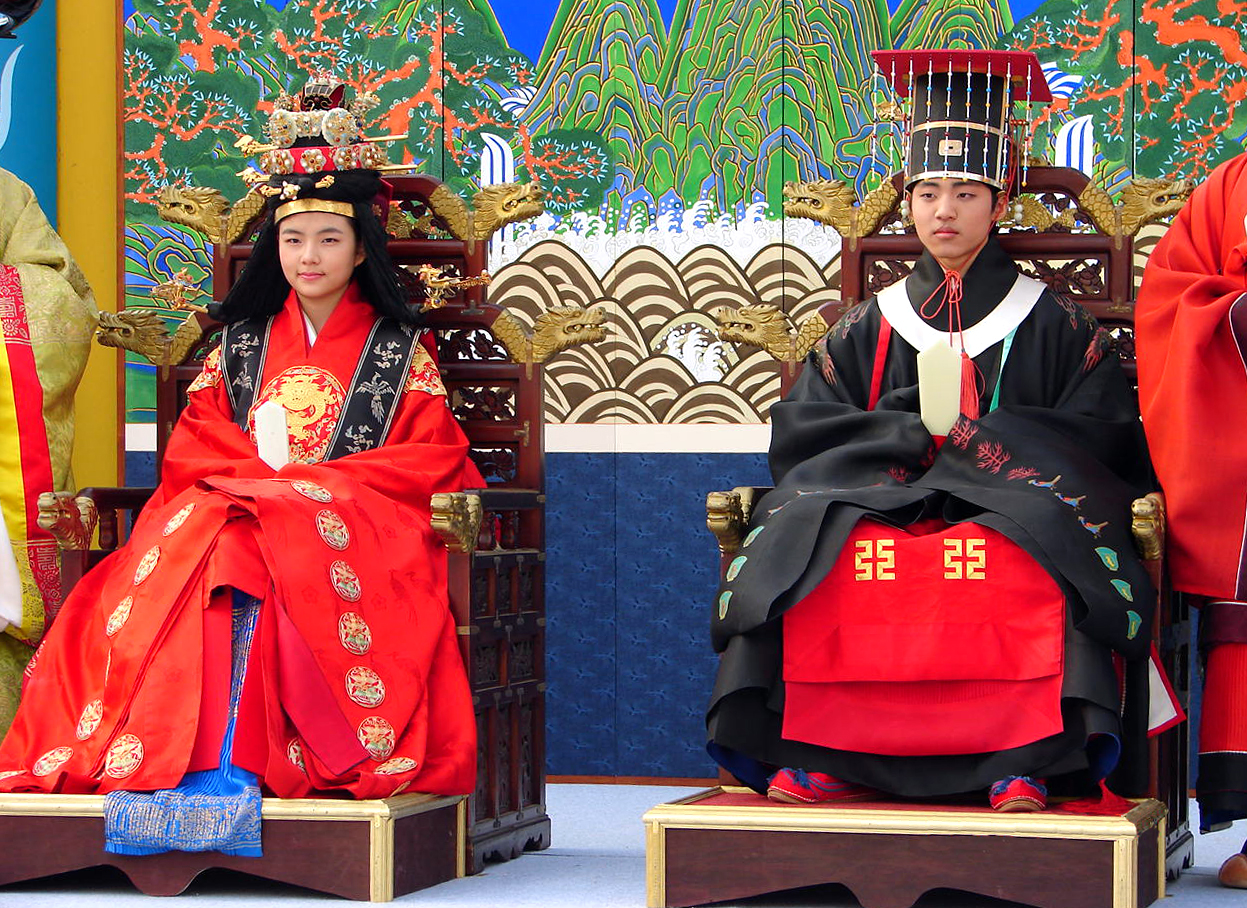
Traditional Korean royal wedding ceremony with the male wearing royal costume

Large-scale emigration from Korea began as early as the mid-1860s, mainly into the Russian Far East and Northeast China (also historically known by the exonym Manchuria); these populations would later grow to more than two million Koreans in China and several hundred thousand Koryo-saram (ethnic Koreans in Central Asia and the former USSR). During the Korea under Japanese rule of 1910–1945, Koreans were often recruited and or forced into labour service to work in mainland Japan, Karafuto Prefecture (Sakhalin), and Manchukuo; the ones who chose to remain in Japan at the end of the war became known as Zainichi Koreans, while the roughly 40,000 Koreans who were trapped in Karafuto after the Soviet invasion are typically referred to as Sakhalin Koreans.

=== South Korea ===
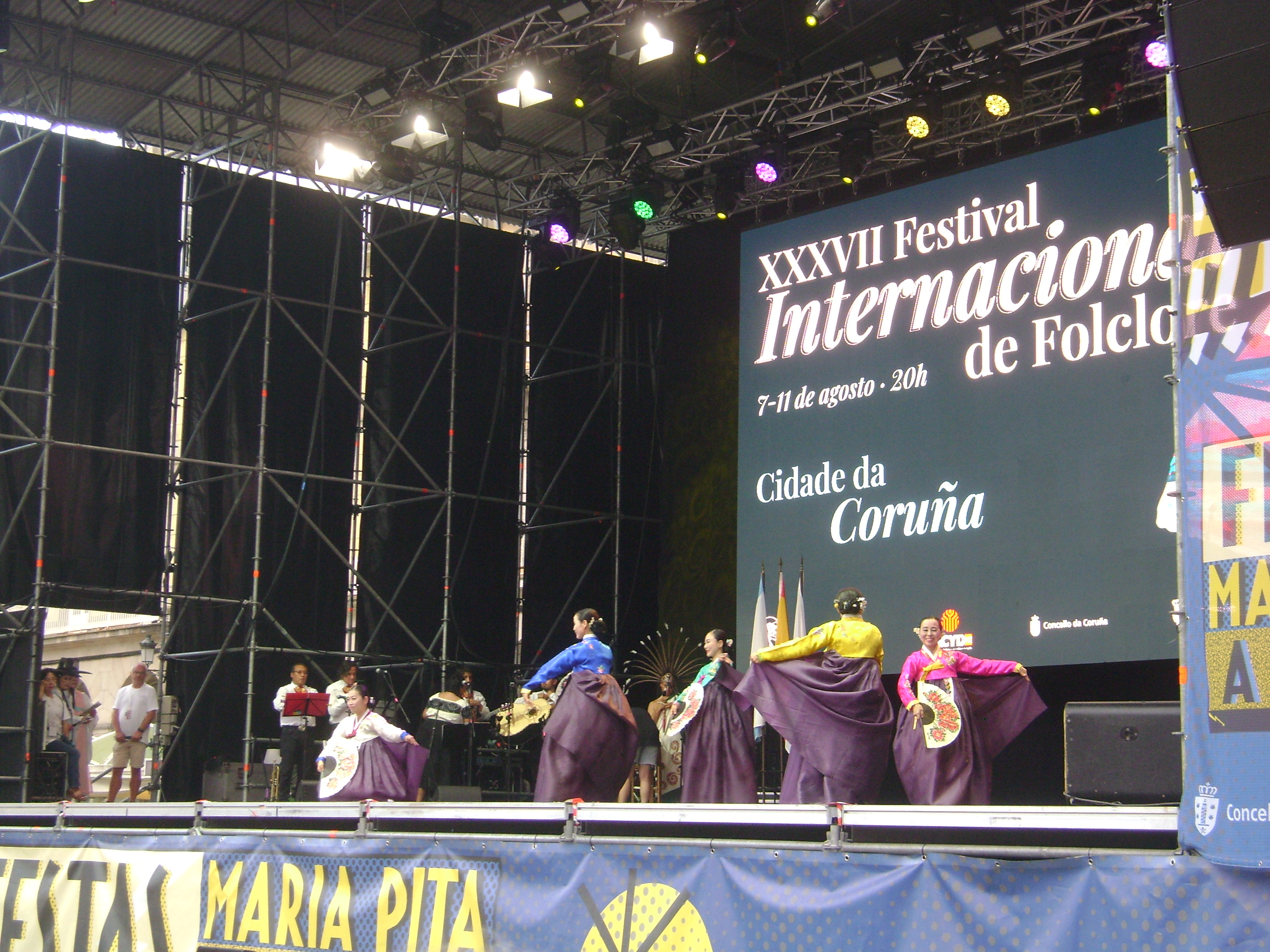
Korean folklore show in La Coruña, Galicia, (Spain).

In June 2012, South Korea's population reached 50 million and by the end of 2016, South Korea's population has surpassed 51 million people. Since the 2000s, South Korea has been struggling with a low birthrate, leading some researchers to suggest that if current population trends hold, the country's population will shrink to approximately 38 million population towards the end of the 21st century. In 2018, fertility in South Korea became again a topic of international debate after only 26,500 babies were born in October and an estimated 325,000 babies in the year, causing the country to have the lowest birth rate in the world.

=== North Korea ===
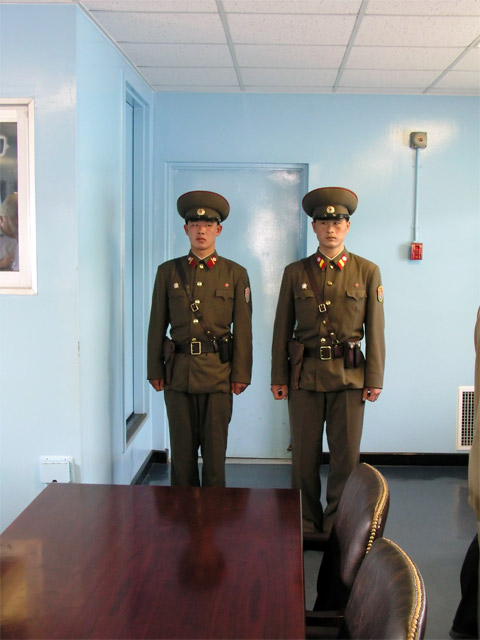
North Korean soldiers wearing Soviet-inspired uniform in the Joint Security Area

Estimating the size, growth rate, sex ratio, and age structure of North Korea's population has been extremely difficult. Until release of official data in 1989, the 1963 edition of the North Korea Central Yearbook was the last official publication to disclose population figures. After 1963 demographers used varying methods to estimate the population. They either totalled the number of delegates elected to the Supreme People's Assembly (each delegate representing 50,000 people before 1962 and 30,000 people afterwards) or relied on official statements that a certain number of persons, or percentage of the population, was engaged in a particular activity. Thus, on the basis of remarks made by President Kim Il Sung in 1977 concerning school attendance, the population that year was calculated at 17.2 million persons. During the 1980s, health statistics, including life expectancy and causes of mortality, were gradually made available to the outside world.

In 1989, the Central Bureau of Statistics released demographic data to the United Nations Population Fund in order to secure the UNFPA's assistance in holding North Korea's first nationwide census since the establishment of the state in 1948. Although the figures given to the United Nations might have been distorted, it appears that in line with other attempts to open itself to the outside world, the North Korean regime has also opened somewhat in the demographic realm. Although the country lacks trained demographers, accurate data on household registration, migration, and births and deaths are available to North Korean authorities. According to the United States scholar Nicholas Eberstadt and demographer Brian Ko, vital statistics and personal information on residents are kept by agencies on the ri ("village", the local administrative unit) level in rural areas and the dong ("district" or "block") level in urban areas.

=== Korean diaspora ===
Korean emigration to the U.S. was known to have begun as early as 1903, but the Korean American community did not grow to a significant size until after the passage of the Immigration and Nationality Act of 1965; as of 2017, excluding the undocumented and uncounted, roughly 1.85 million Koreans emigrants and people of Korean descent live in the United States according to the official figure by the US Census. The Greater Los Angeles Area and New York metropolitan area in the United States contain the largest populations of ethnic Koreans outside of Korea or China. The Korean population in the United States represents a small share of the American economy, but has a disproportionately positive impact. Korean Americans have a savings rate double that of the U.S. average and also graduate from college at a rate double that of the U.S. average, providing highly skilled and educated professionals to the American workforce. According to the U.S. Census Bureau's Census 2021 data, median household earnings for Korean Americans was $82,946, approximately 19.0% higher than the U.S. average at the time of $69,717.

Significant Overseas Korean populations are also present in China, Japan, Argentina, Brazil, and Canada as well. The number of Koreans in Indonesia grew during the 1980s, while during the 1990s and 2000s the number of Koreans in the Philippines and Koreans in Vietnam have also grown significantly. In Central Asia, significant populations reside in Uzbekistan and Kazakhstan, as well as parts of Russia including the Far East. Known as Koryo-saram, many of these are descendants of Koreans who were forcely deported during the Soviet Union's Stalin regime. The Korean overseas community of Uzbekistan is the 5th largest outside Korea.

British Koreans now form Western Europe's largest Korean community, albeit still relatively small; Koreans in Germany used to outnumber those in the UK until the late 1990s. In Australia, Korean Australians comprise a modest minority. Koreans have migrated significantly since the 1960s.

=== Part-Korean populations ===
Pak Noja said that there were 5,747 Japanese-Korean couples in Korea at the end of 1941. Pak Cheil estimated there to be 70,000 to 80,000 "semi-Koreans" in Japan in the years immediately after the war. Many of them remained in Japan as Zainichi Koreans, maintaining their Korean heritage. However, due to assimilation, their numbers are much lower in recent times.

Kopinos are people of mixed Filipino and Korean descent. The 'Mixed Filipino Heritage Act of 2020' estimated there were around 30,000 Kopinos.

Lai Đại Hàn is a Vietnamese term referring to mixed children born to South Korean men and South Vietnamese women during the Vietnam War. These children were largely conceived as the result of wartime rape. No exact data is available on the number of Korean-Vietnamese because many of them choose to conceal their roots, but an estimate by a Korean scholar says the number of Lai Dai Han around the world is at least 5,000 to as many as 150,000.

== See also ==
- Korean Wave
- Demographics of South Korea
- Ethnic groups in Asia
- History of Korea
- Koreatown
