= Asian Africans =

Category of ethnic groups

There is a significant Asian presence in Africa of at least 3 million people. Most have arrived in the 1930s, following European settlement; however, there is continued immigration to the continent to pursue economic opportunities.

== Asians in Africa ==
#	Country	Asians
1	South Africa	1,000,000
2	Nigeria	945,000
3	Mauritius	929,000
4	Sudan	324,000
5	Egypt	310,000
6	Ivory Coast	300,000
7	Kenya	170,000
8	Sierra Leone	150,000
9	Madagascar	125,000
10	Zambia	113,000
11	Namibia	100,000
12	Uganda	100,000
13	DR Congo	90,000
14	Tanzania	90,000
15	Mozambique	82,000
16	Ethiopia	64,000
17	Angola	50,000
18	Senegal	45,000
19	Djibouti	44,000
20	Algeria	40,000
21	Chad	40,000
22	Ghana	30,000
23	Congo	25,000
24	Lesotho	20,000
25	Zimbabwe	19,000
26	Malawi	13,000
27	Botswana	12,000
28	Seychelles	10,000
29	Zimbabwe	9,000
30	São Tomé and Príncipe	8,000
31	Cameroon	5,000
32	Equatorial Guinea	5,000
33	South Sudan	3,700
34	Liberia	3,000
35	Mali	3,000
36	Rwanda	3,000
37	Togo	3,000
38	Burundi	2,000
39	Eritrea	1,200
40	Niger	1,000

== Chinese in Africa ==
The African continent is seeing a very rapidly growing number of Chinese immigrants coming to the continent for economic opportunities. Many of the first Chinese people on the continent were brought as contract labourers, similarly to the Indian community. Over 1 million Chinese workers currently live in Africa. ~400,000 Chinese live in South Africa, 100,000 in Madagascar, 100,000 in Zambia, 74,000 in Sudan, 60,000 in Ethiopia, 50,000 in Angola, 50,000 in Kenya, 50,000 in Nigeria, 50,000 in Uganda, 40,000 in Algeria, 40,000 in Chad, 35,000 in Mauritius, 30,000 in Tanzania, 25,000 in the Republic of the Congo, 20,000 in Lesotho, 12,000 in Mozambique, 10,000 in Egypt and 10,000 in Namibia. 9,000 Chinese live in Zimbabwe, 6,000 in Botswana, 5,000 in Cameroon, 5,000 in Equatorial Guinea, 5,000 in Guinea, 3,000 in Djibouti, 3,000 in Malawi, 3,000 in Mali, 3,000 in Togo 2,000 in Senegal 1,000 in Niger and 1,000 Chinese live in South Sudan. Most of the estimated 50,000 Chinese people in the DRC live in Kinshasa or work for the mining companies of Haut-Katanga Province.

National Geographic also published an article by Frank Viviano; in July 2005, he visited Pate Island. During the time he stayed on Lamu, ceramic fragments had been found around Lamu which the administrative officer of the local Swahili history museum claimed were of Chinese origin, specifically from Zheng He's voyage to east Africa. The eyes of the Pate people resembled Chinese and Famao and Wei were some of the names among them which were speculated to be of Chinese origin. Their ancestors were said to be from indigenous women who intermarried with Chinese Ming sailors when they were shipwrecked. Two places on Pate were called "Old Shanga", and "New Shanga", which the Chinese sailors had named. A local guide who claimed descent from the Chinese showed Frank a graveyard made out of coral on the island, indicating that they were the graves of the Chinese sailors, which the author described as "virtually identical", to Chinese Ming dynasty tombs, complete with "half-moon domes" and "terraced entries".

Many Chinese men working in Africa have married Black African women in Angola, South Africa, Gabon, Tanzania, Côte d'Ivoire, Kenya, Lagos in Nigeria, Congo & Ethiopia and fathered children with them.

Many Chinese men who engaged in gold mining in Ghana married local Black African Ghanaian women and had children with them and then the Ghana government deported illegal miners, leaving the mixed race Chinese fathered children stranded in Ghana while their fathers were sent back to China.

Many Ugandan women have been marrying Chinese businessmen who moved to Uganda.

Gabonese politician Jean Ping is the son of a Chinese father and Gabonese mother.

New interest in Kenya's natural resources has attracted over $1 billion of investment from Chinese firms. This has propelled new development in Kenya's infrastructure with Chinese firms bringing in their own male workers to build roads. The temporary residents usually arrive without their spouses and families. Thus, a rise of incidents involving local college-aged females has resulted in an increased rate of Afro-Chinese infant births to single Kenyan mothers.

In Kenya there is a trend of the following influx of Chinese male workers in Kenya with a growing number of abandoned babies of Chinese men who fathered children with local women, causing concern.

== Indians in Africa ==
The Indian community in Africa is found throughout the continent with large communities existing in South Africa, Mauritius, Réunion, and other parts of the continent. The arrival of Indians on the continent often coincides with the expanding European presence on the continent. There continues to be a notable Indian presence with numbers currently estimating roughly 2,750,000 Indians on the continent. There have historically been and continue to be tensions between Indians and native African communities throughout the continent. The most notable example being the expulsion of Indians by Ugandan dictator Idi Amin. Other Indians came more recently to Africa as traders and professional workers especially in Mozambique with its huge group of Indians. The 70,000 Indians in Mozambique have had a long history with their origins in Mozambique. The African nations with the largest Indian communities are South Africa with 1,560,000, Mauritius with 894,000, Nigeria with 800,000 to 1,000,000, Réunion with 280,250, Kenya with 110,000, Mozambique with 70,000, Tanzania with 60,000, Uganda with 50,000, Madagascar with 25,000, Zambia with 13,000 and Ghana, Malawi, the Seychelles and Zimbabwe with 10,000. 8,000 Indians live in Botswana, 8,000 in São Tomé and Príncipe, 3,000 in Rwanda, 2,700 in South Sudan, Burundi with 2,000, and Eritrea with 1,200. 20,000 foreigners of which 4,372 are Indians work in the DR Congo for MONUSCO. People from India, Bangladesh, Pakistan and Uruguay are the main workers for MONUSCO in the DR Congo.

=== Indians in South Africa ===
The first Indians in South Africa arrived on the Cape of Good Hope as slaves brought by the Dutch East Indies Company in 1654; however these slaves were fully assimilated into the Afrikaner and Coloured communities. The most significant migrations of Indians came when Natal become a British colony and large numbers were brought as indentured labourers, often serving as labourers on sugar plantations, but also in coal mines. More than 150,000 Indians were brought to the Natal over the course of 5 decades. The long term result was that by 1904 the Indian presence in the Natal outnumbered the white presence. The Indian community has faced legal discrimination.

=== Indians in East Africa ===
In 1887, the British East Africa Association was formed in Bombay, and was later given a Royal Charter becoming the Imperial British East Africa Association. In 1895 the East Africa Protectorate took over the assets and personnel of the Imperial British East Africa Association, and began construction of the Uganda Railway. Recruitment for the railway was outsourced to A.M. Jeevanjee of Karachi, and large numbers of labourers sourced from the Punjab. Over the course of six years, 32,000 labourers were recruited. Many settled in the region at the end of their contracts and brought family over from India. These early settlers were accompanied by increasing numbers of migrants from Gujarat, Punjab, and western India seeking out new opportunities in the region.

Large numbers of the Asian community left east Africa in the 1960s and 1970s due to racial tensions post-independence. In 1972, Idi Amin, dictator of Uganda, expelled all Asians and confiscated their property. At the time, Asians accounted for 90% of the country's businesses and tax revenues. Since the 1980s, the Ugandan government has encouraged the return of those Asians who were expelled.

On 22 July 2017, the Asian community were officially recognised as the 44th tribe of Kenya, recognising the community's contribution to Kenya from the dawn of the nation.

== Lebanese in Africa ==
Over 500,000 people from Lebanon moved to Africa. 30,000 to 75,000 Lebanese people live in Nigeria, and 40,000 live in Senegal. 3,000 Lebanese live in Liberia, representing 0.1% of its population. As of 1984, 30,000 Lebanese people lived in Sierra Leone.

== Syrians in Africa ==
300,000 refugees from Syria moved to Egypt according to the Ministry of Foreign Affairs. 250,000 refugees from Syria moved to Sudan in recent years. They represent 0.6% of its total population. Most of the Syrians live in Khartoum, where they represent an estimated 4% of the total population.

== Austronesians in Africa ==
The Merina people of Madagascar along with the Betsileo tribe are likely of Austronesian descent. Together, they represent about 35% of the population of the island of Madagascar. These two dominant ethnic groups are commonly accepted as indigenous to Madagascar, though they are likely descendants of Malay and Polynesian immigrations. For example, the Malagasy language is unrelated to nearby African languages, instead being the westernmost member of the Malayo-Polynesian branch of the Austronesian language family.

== Eurasians in Africa ==
Here is a list with the 11 million Eurasians living in Africa, see also White Africans of European ancestry. The countries in the list are ranked by population of non-African heritage, followed by main immigration country. The amount of mixed race Africans with at least one Eurasian ancestor is over 10% of the total population of Africa, or at least 150 million people. 6.2 million Eurasians live in Southern Africa, 2.2 million in Eastern Africa, 1.4 million in Western Africa, 931,000 in Northern Africa and 570,000 in Central Africa.

#	Country	Eurasians	Including mixed race
1	South Africa	5m	11m
2	Nigeria	1m	
3	Mauritius	939,000	
4	Angola	350,000	1m
5	Egypt	329,000	42m
6	Sudan	325,000	9m
7	Ivory Coast	315,000	
8	Namibia	250,000	393,000
9	Kenya	211,000	
10	Mozambique	164,000	
11	Zambia	153,000	
12	Sierra Leone	150,000	
13	Madagascar	144,000	15m
14	Tunisia	115,000	4m
15	Uganda	110,000	
16	Equatorial Guinea	102,000	
17	DR Congo	100,000	
18	Morocco	100,000	14m
19	Tanzania	100,000	
20	Senegal	95,000	
21	Botswana	82,000	
22	Ethiopia	64,000	19m
23	Djibouti	52,000	700,000
24	Zimbabwe	47,000	
25	Chad	41,000	1m
26	Algeria	40,000	23m
27	Congo	40,000	
28	Eswatini	32,000	
29	Ghana	30,000	
30	Malawi	23,000	
31	Libya	22,000	4m
32	Lesotho	21,000	
33	Gabon	15,000	
34	Cameroon	12,134	
35	Central African Republic	11,987	
36	Benin	10,000	
37	Mali	10,000	1m
38	Seychelles	10,000	
39	Rwanda	9,000	
40	Guinea-Bissau	8,703	
41	São Tomé and Príncipe	8,000	69,000
42	South Sudan	5,700	
43	Burkina Faso	5,000	
44	Burundi	5,000	
45	Cape Verde	5,000	421,136
46	Guinea	5,000	
47	Liberia	5,000	
48	Togo	4,000	
49	Somalia	3,000	2m
50	Niger	2,000	2m
51	Mauritania	1,600	2m
52	Gambia	1,500	
53	Eritrea	1,200	1m

Angola has 500,000 people of mixed race or black and white. South Africa has 5,176,000 coloureds, Namibia 143,000 and Zimbabwe 17,000. Tens of millions of people living in Sub-Saharan Africa are Eurasians, mixed race or have at least one Eurasian ancestor. Egypt has 42 million, Ethiopia 19 million, Madagascar 15 million and South Africa 11 million. At least 10% of the people from Djibouti, Eritrea, Ethiopia, Madagascar, Mauritius, Namibia, the Seychelles, Somalia and South Africa have Eurasian ancestors. At least 10% of the people from Algeria, Egypt, Libya, Morocco and Tunisia also have Eurasian ancestors. The majority of the people from the Canary Islands, Cape Verde and Réunion have European ancestors. 1,425,760 white people live on the Canary Islands, which is part of Spanish Africa. 260,000 white people live on Réunion, which is part of the French territories in Africa. 2,500 Eurasian MINUSMA personnel, many from Bangladesh, China and Germany, live in Mali 3,000 soldiers from France, 3,000 other Chinese and 2,000 Syrians also live in Mali, which results in over 10,000 Eurasians living in Mali.

== See also ==
- Afro-Asians
- Asian people
- Africa–China relations
  - Chinese South Africans
  - Chinese people in Namibia
  - Overseas Chinese
- Africa–India relations
  - Indian South Africans
  - Indians in Kenya
  - Indian diaspora in Southeast Africa
  - Indians in Tanzania
  - Indians in Uganda
- Asian (South Africa)
- Ethnic groups in Asia
- Koreans in Africa
  - Koreans in Canary Islands
  - Koreans in South Africa
- White Africans of European ancestry
