= National Mang-Hyang Cemetery =

Cemetery in Cheonan, South Korea

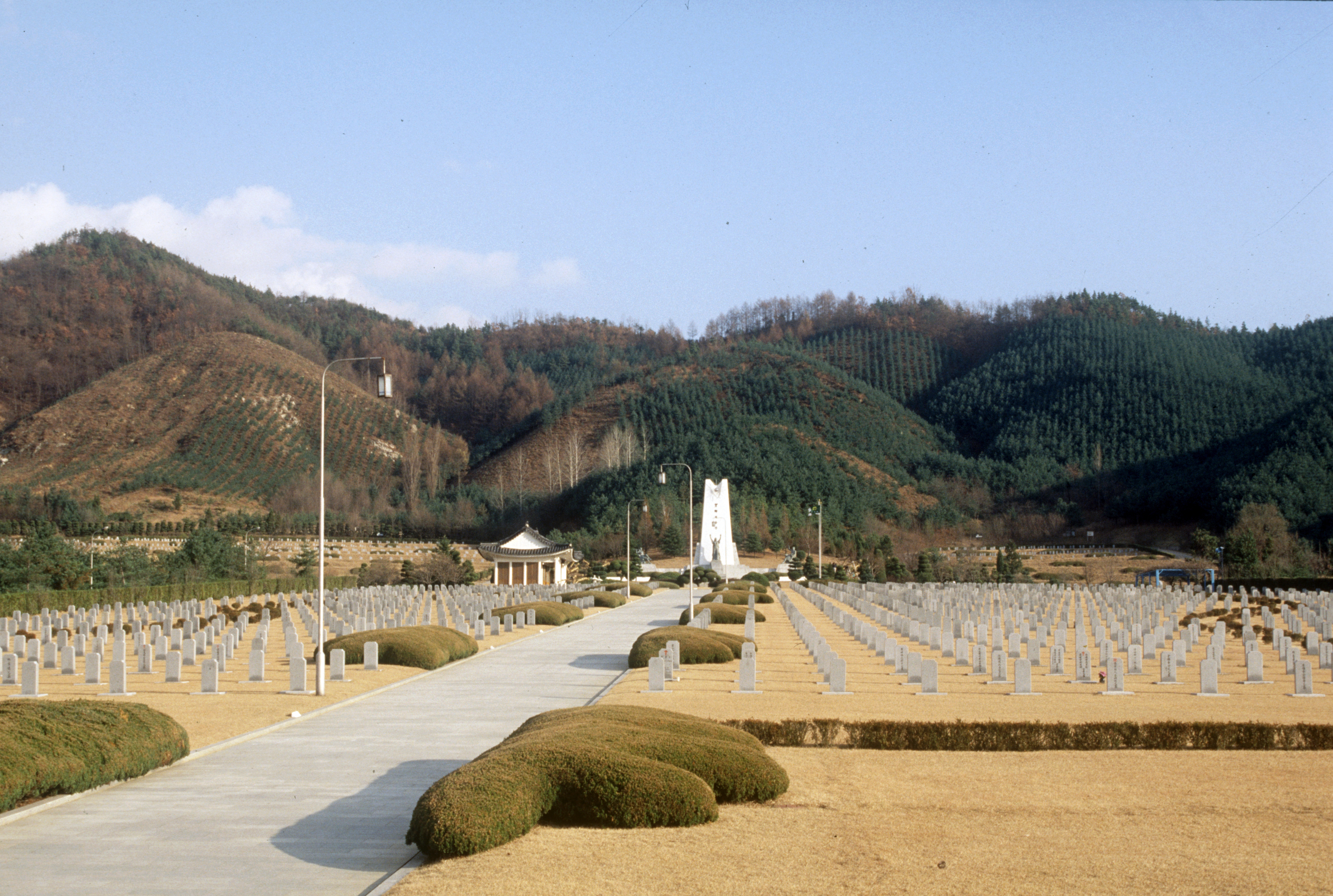
- The cemetery (c. 2007)

Details
- Established: October 2, 1976
- Location: Seonggeo-eup, Seobuk-gu, Cheonan, South Chungcheong Province, South Korea
- Size: 5.1485 ha (12.722 acres)
- Website: nmhc.go.kr/eng/ (in English)

National Mang-Hyang Cemetery (Korean: 국립망향의동산; Hanja: 國立望鄕의동산) is a cemetery in Seonggeo-eup, Seobuk-gu, Cheonan, South Chungcheong Province, South Korea. The cemetery is largely devoted to interring the remains of members of the Korean diaspora.

== Description ==
It was founded on October 2, 1976. It was first conceptualized by the organization Mindan, which represents Zainichi Koreans (pre-1945 Koreans in Japan and their descendents) that are aligned with South Korea (by contrast, Chongryon is meant for Zainichis aligned with North Korea). Mindan submitted a petition to create such a cemetery to the South Korean government, and the government accepted the petition. The first burial was conducted on October 10, 1976. The total land area of the cemetery proper is 51,485 m^{2} (554,180 ft^{2}), and there is space for 7,680 graves.

The cemetery was initially meant to hold the remains of Zainichi Koreans. Since then, its scope has expanded to include all members of the Korean diaspora. It became a national cemetery in 2013.

People over 70 years old can apply to reserve a spot in the cemetery. According to the official website, applicants must meet at least one of the following conditions:

- Koreans (with living relatives at time of burial, and have reserved a plot in advance, who hold or formerly held South Korean nationality) who have been residing overseas before December 31, 1988.
- Direct descendents of pre-1945 Korean emigrants, who were born overseas (with living relatives at time of burial and have reserved a plot in advance).
- Others who have received approval from the Minister of Health and Welfare.
- Spouses of people who meet any of the above qualifications.

For people who have already died, efforts can be made by other people to repatriate their remains. However, this process can be complicated if the deceased has no known living relatives. In some cases, companies such as Nippon Kokan or Nippon Light Metal, which benefitted from the forced labor of Koreans during the colonial period, have reportedly refused to provide records on Koreans that could help in locating their relatives. In other instances, local Japanese governments have assisted in locating relatives.

Each year, a memorial ceremony is held in the cemetery on October 2. There are various memorials for Koreans whose remains are now lost. In August 2018, a monument was established in honor of comfort women, the term for sex slaves of Japan during World War II.

Numerous groups in the Korean diaspora are represented in the cemetery. It holds memorials for those who remains were lost or destroyed during World War II. It has a memorial for the passengers of Korean Air Lines Flight 007, who were shot down by the Soviet Union over Sakhalin on September 1, 1983.
