= Korean New Zealanders =

Ethnic group

Total population
- 35,664 (2018) 30,975 (born in Republic of Korea) 0.76% of the population

Regions with significant populations
- Auckland: 25,038
- Canterbury: 3,705
- Bay of Plenty: 1,557
- Waikato: 1,548
- Wellington: 1,299
- Otago: 792

Languages
- Korean, English

Religion
- 57.0% Christianity; 37.4% No religion 2.2% Buddhism

Related ethnic groups
- Overseas Koreans

Korean New Zealanders (Korean: 한국계 뉴질랜드인), also referred to informally as Korean Kiwis, Kokis or Kowis, are New Zealand citizens and residents of Korean ancestry. The 2018 New Zealand census found 35,664 Koreans in the country, virtually all from South Korea, making them the fourth-largest Asian population there, and more than 0.75 percent of the total population of New Zealand.

== Migration history ==
The Korean population in New Zealand has been affected by New Zealand's immigration policies. Until a policy change in 1987, preference was given to English-speaking migrants, especially those from Commonwealth of Nations countries. In 1991, a new policy took effect in which potential migrants were ranked according to a points system based on factors such as education, occupation, and wealth. This made it far easier for people from Korea and other Asian countries to migrate to New Zealand, dramatically increasing the number of Korean New Zealanders.

In 1986, there were only 426 Koreans in New Zealand; that had doubled to 903 by 1991, and their population growth accelerated throughout the first half of the 1990s. There were roughly 3,000 people of Korean descent in New Zealand in 1992, according to unofficial estimates, and by the time of the 1996 Census, their population had quadrupled to 12,657 individuals, making them the fastest-growing population group. Growth slowed after that, with only a further 50% increase in the Korean population by 2001.

== Demography ==
There were 35,664 people identifying as being part of the Korean ethnic group at the 2018 New Zealand census, making up 0.8% of New Zealand's population. This is an increase of 5,493 people (18.2%) since the 2013 census, and an increase of 4,872 people (15.8%) since the 2006 census. Some of the increase between the 2013 and 2018 census was due to Statistics New Zealand adding ethnicity data from other sources (previous censuses, administrative data, and imputation) to the 2018 census data to reduce the number of non-responses.

There were 18,933 females and 16,731 males, giving a sex ratio of 0.884 males per female. The median age was 33.2 years (compared with 37.4 years for New Zealand as a whole), with 6,297 people (17.7%) were aged under 15 years, 9,711 (27.2%) were 15 to 29, 17,709 (49.7%) were 30 to 64, and 1,947 (5.5%) were 65 or older.

In terms of population distribution, 70.2% of Korean New Zealanders lived in the Auckland region, 15.8% lived in the North Island outside the Auckland region, and 14.0% lived in the South Island. The Upper Harbour local board area of Auckland had the highest concentration of Korean people at 6.9%, followed by the Devonport-Takapuna local board area (5.1%) and the Kaipātiki local board area (3.6%). Christchurch City had the highest concentration of Korean people outside of Auckland at 0.9%. Seven districts recorded no Korean people in their respective areas: Great Barrier Island, Ōtorohanga District, Ōpōtiki District, Central Hawke's Bay District, Carterton District, South Wairarapa District, and the Chatham Islands.

The proportion of Korean New Zealanders born overseas was 85.3%, compared with 27.1% for all ethnicities. Nearly three-quarters (73.9%) of those born in New Zealand were aged under 30.

The 2018 census recorded 76.3% of Korean New Zealanders were able to speak English conversationally, compared to 95.4% for New Zealand as a whole.

Women outnumbered men in every age group besides 15 and under; the imbalance was most severe in the 25-39 age group, with only 71 men for every 100 women. This gender gap is mainly the result of the so-called astronaut family phenomenon, also seen among Chinese New Zealanders and Koreans in other countries, in which husbands who found their earning power decreased after emigration returned to their country of origin while their wives and children remained in the destination country.

== Education and language issues ==
The desire to offer children a lower-pressure educational experience in an English-speaking country, as well as a cleaner environment, is a major motivation for Korean migration to New Zealand. Of the 7,696 Koreans pursuing secondary or tertiary education in New Zealand as of 2001, 50% were studying English as a second language. 1.5 generation Koreans who migrated at a young age show a marked shift towards English regardless of which region their parents settled in, but among those who migrated at the age of 16 or older, Wellington residents also showed a much stronger preference for English, while those in other regions maintained Korean as their preferred language. In the 1996 census, 40.7% of Koreans stated that they could not hold a conversation in English, the highest proportion for any group; however, by the 2001 census, that figure had decreased to 21% for males and 27% for females.

Korean New Zealanders maintain close contact with their homeland through return trips or with technologies such as phones and emails; one 1998 survey showed that 61% of overseas trips undertaken by Korean New Zealanders had South Korea as their destination. Australia and Japan were the next most popular destinations. In addition, young Korean New Zealanders make extensive use of Korean language internet portal sites such as Cyworld and KakaoTalk in order to communicate with friends in South Korea; this has resulted in Korean New Zealanders retaining a far better command of Korean than their Korean American counterparts.

== Religion ==
70% of Koreans in New Zealand identify as Christians, while roughly another 20% claim to follow no religion. Buddhists number only about 5%. One Christian newspaper estimates that roughly 35-40% of all Koreans are "active Christians" who regularly attend worship services, mostly at one of New Zealand's 100 Korean churches. Korean Christians in New Zealand are largely of the Presbyterian denomination, though some are also Baptist. They attend non-Korean churches less often due to language barriers and cultural differences within the church. In Korean churches, the pastor has much more authority, and many churches open as early as 5AM for morning prayers. New Zealand's Korean Christians are served by a weekly Christian newspaper published in the Korean language, which claims to have a circulation of 3,500; it discusses religious issues as well as issues of common interest to immigrants, such as migration law and property ownership.

== Notable people ==
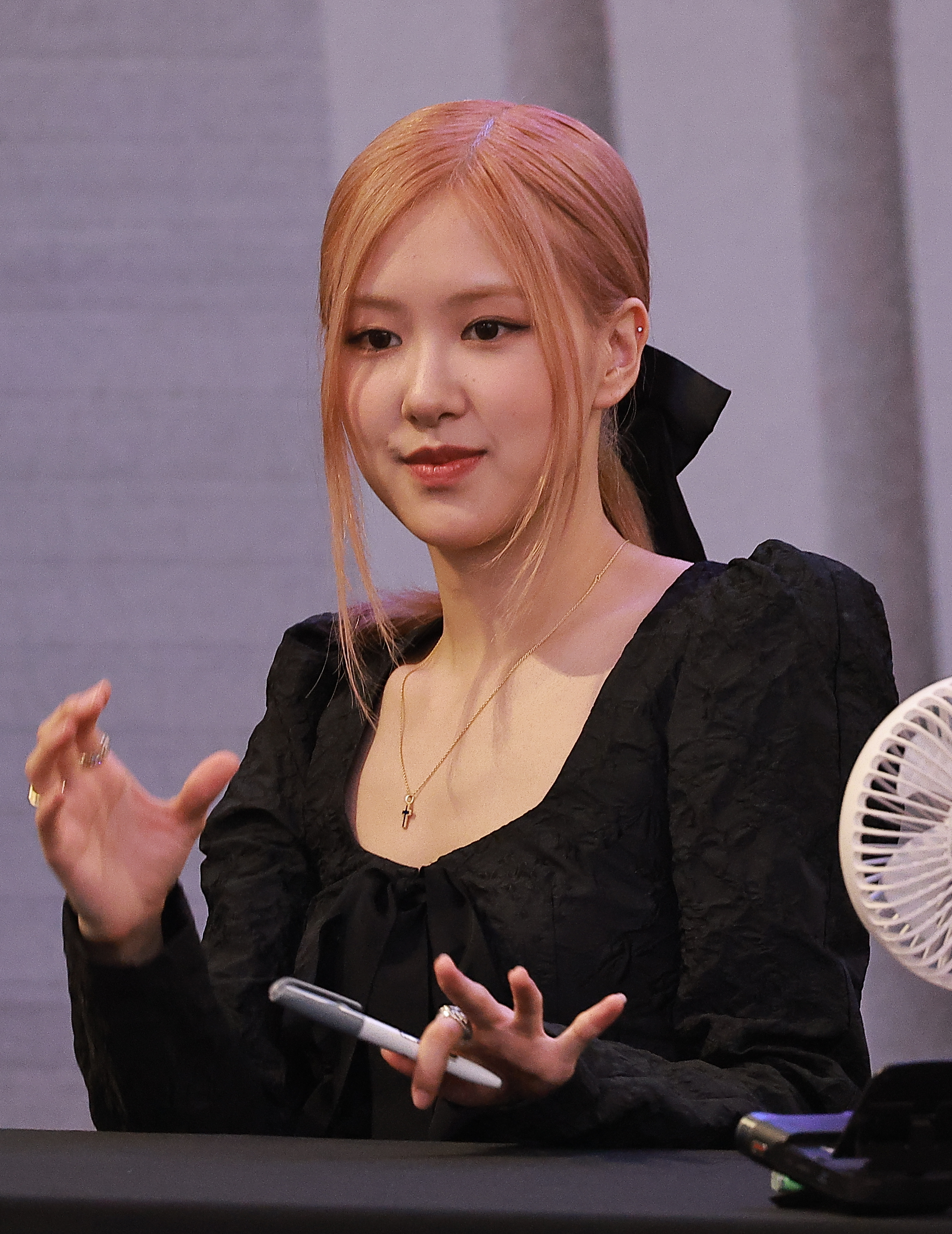
Rosé

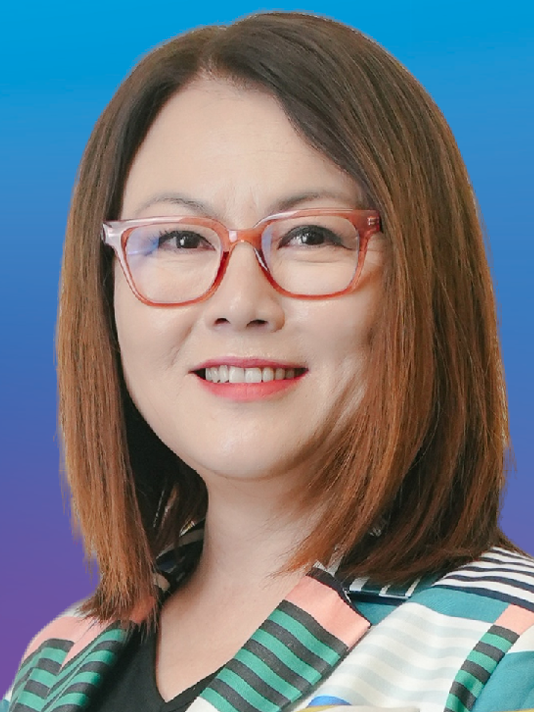
Melissa Lee

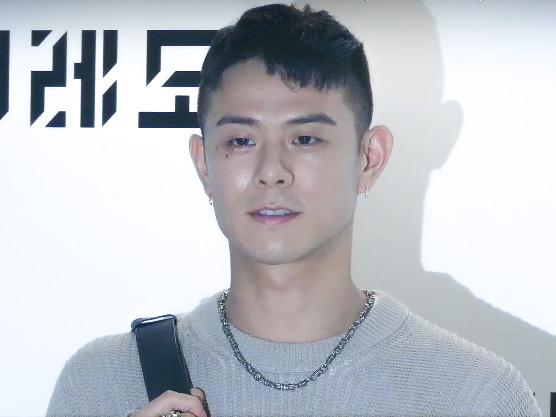
Beenzino

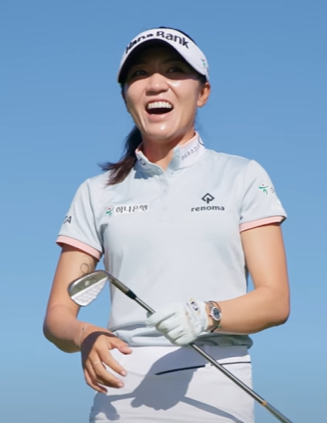
Lydia Ko

- Alex Kam, figure skater
- Beenzino, South Korean rapper
- Bizzy, New Zealand–Korean rapper and producer
- Danny Lee, youngest winner of the U.S. Amateur golf tournament
- Lydia Ko, youngest-ever winner of an LPGA Tour event, youngest women's No.1 golfer.
- Melissa Lee, New Zealand's first MP of Korean origin
- Microdot, South Korean–New Zealand rapper
- Robin Cheong, taekwondo athlete
- Rosé, New Zealand-born singer and member of South Korean girl group Blackpink

== See also ==
- Demographics of New Zealand
- Asian New Zealanders
