= Koreans in the Arab world =

Total population
- c. 29,000

Regions with significant populations
- United Arab Emirates: 32,000
- Saudi Arabia: 27,000
- Qatar: 19,000
- Algeria: 18,000
- Kuwait: 15,000
- Egypt: 11,000
- Jordan: 10,000
- Oman: 2019
- Morocco: 2004
- Bahrain: 2000
- Tunisia: 1990
- Syria: 1900
- Iraq: 1830
- Yemen: 1774
- Libya: 1615
- Sudan: 1500
- Lebanon: 1443
- Mauritania: 1341
- Palestine: 1228

Languages
- Korean, Arabic, English, French

Religion
- Buddhism, Christianity, Islam

Related ethnic groups
- Korean diaspora

Koreans in the Arab world used to form a major part of the worldwide Korean diaspora. Koreans started coming to the Arab world in large numbers in early 1970s as migrant labourers; between 1975 and 1985, 1.1 million Koreans came for work, which made it the third-most popular destination for Korean emigrants. Eventually, most returned home or moved on to other countries, and as of 2014, the South Korean government's own figures showed over 24 thousand of their nationals living in the region. However, South Korean nationals are present in all of the region's countries, and North Korean workers also have a growing presence in several of them.

== History ==
Though Korea had a long history of trading contact with the Arab world by means of intermediaries, there were no recorded Korean visitors before 1959, when two Korean Muslims went to Mecca for the hajj. In 1974, the first South Korean firm won a contract in the region, for highway construction in Saudi Arabia, and imported 218 South Korean construction workers, the first Korean residents, to assist in the project. The following year, 3,593 South Koreans went to Saudi Arabia for work. By 1977, migrants to Saudi Arabia alone composed nearly one-fifth of all registered emigration from South Korea, making it the third-most popular destination for emigrants (the top two being Japan and the United States, each of which had longstanding Korean communities, Korean Americans and Zainichi Koreans).

The growth in the South Korean migrant worker population reflected a deliberate policy of the government to promote manpower exports; they had established a special department for this purpose as early as the mid-1960s, and in the 1970s, construction enterprises were given priority in order to facilitate their entry into overseas markets. Over two dozen South Korean companies employed migrant labour, the largest such employer being Hyundai Construction; Koreans were described as having a "competitive advantage" over workers of other nationalities due to their discipline and level of skill, which some commentators attributed to South Korea's practise of universal male conscription. Unlike their Western competitors, Koreans worked around the clock in shifts; huge lighting systems were installed to facilitate night work. A survey of migrants showed that 73% were between 25 and 40 years old; under half (48%) of the regular workers were married, while 69% of contract workers were.

The receiving countries were concerned about the effect that long-term residence of migrant workers could have on their societies; they preferred Korean workers because they were unaccompanied by family members and so stayed only for short periods. The typical length of an assignment in the region was three years. Migration to the region would peak in 1982 and 1983. Wages were around four to five million won, roughly twice what could be earned in South Korea at the time, and workers typically remitted 80% of their salaries. Families used saved remittances to purchase houses or start businesses. However, migration was not a success for everyone: roughly one-in-ten workers returned from the Middle East reported a decrease in income, usually due to inability to find suitable work. The hot, dry climate and long work hours also resulted in health problems for many workers, and the medical bills whittled away at their savings.

Several factors in the late 1980s contributed to decreasing the amount of Korean migration. Increasing labour unrest initiated by South Korean workers provided one stimulus for the localisation of the workforce. South Korea's rising labour costs were another reason. During the latter half of the 1980s, the proportion of Korean labourers working on construction projects for Hyundai declined from 70% to only 20–30% during the 1980s, with the shortfall being taken up by local labourers instead. By 1990, only 56,000 South Korean migrant workers went abroad to any destination, a drop of over 70% since 1982. By 1992, the wage gap between South Korea and the rich countries of the Middle East had largely disappeared. The South Korean population would shrink over the following decade before rebounding slightly to 13,008 by 2009. Over the next two years, the population would show rapid growth of nearly 27%, reaching 16,461 by 2011. Nearly three-quarters of that recent population growth was driven by increased migration to the United Arab Emirates.

Furthermore, in an echo of the South Korean policy of the 1970s and 1980s, the North Korean government has also been sending its workers abroad to earn hard currency for their country recently. As of 2009, there were estimated to be six thousand North Korean workers in various Arab countries, including Kuwait, Qatar, the United Arab Emirates, Oman, and Yemen; like the South Koreans two decades earlier, they also work primarily in construction-related trades such as welding and carpentry.

== By country ==
=== Bahrain ===
Bahrain was a minor destination for South Korean migrant workers in the late 1970s and early 1980s. South Korea used to have an embassy in Bahrain from 1976 to 1999, but closed it in a round of cost-cutting measures after the 1997 Asian financial crisis. However, South Korean companies continued to do business in various fields in Bahrain, including construction, heavy industry, power, desalination plants and electronic engineering. In 2001, there were only about 70 South Koreans in Bahrain, primarily corporate assignees. However, the small population was enough to support a single Korean supermarket as well as a few Korean restaurants. As of 2011, South Korean consular statistics recorded 282 of their nationals living in Bahrain. Four had Bahraini nationality, while the other 278 were on temporary visas. Their population grew by about 15% since 2009. There were no international students. In 2012, Bahrain and South Korea signed an agreement on promoting study abroad exchanges between the two countries.

=== Egypt ===
Egypt was a relatively minor destination for Korean migrant workers. The Cairo Korean School, founded on 5 December 1979, is one of the region's few Korean day schools; it enrolled 27 students at the elementary level as of 2007. However, their student numbers have been falling, and from 2002 until 2008 they did not even hold any graduation ceremony. There is also a Korean church in Cairo, which conducts various outreach activities. As of 2011, South Korean consular statistics recorded 995 of their nationals or former nationals living in Egypt, with 886 in Cairo and surroundings, and 109 living in other parts of the country. 21 are Egyptian nationals, 65 are international students, and 909 have other kinds of visas. Their population has remained roughly stable since 2009.

The Korean School in Cairo (카이로한국학교), a South Korean international school, is in New Cairo.

=== Iraq ===
The first group of nine South Korean workers arrived in Iraq in 1975; however, until the end of 1980, only a total of 1,958 registered emigrants went to the country. However, their numbers would increase along with the intensification of the Iran–Iraq War; from 1981 until 1985, Iraq was consistently the second to fourth-most popular Arab world destination for South Korean migrant labourers, a total of whom 66,665 went to the country during that period. In March 2003, then-president Roh Moo-hyun agreed to dispatch a contingent of ROK army engineers to Iraq. Later the South Koreans expanded their presence, creating an entirely new division, the Zaytun Division, consisting of 3,600 troops; they were sent to Iraq in September 2004. As of March 2007, about 1,600 remained; another 400 were expected to return home in April, with the others departing by the end of the year. There were also 113 South Korean civilians in Iraq as of 2011.

=== Jordan ===
Jordan was a minor destination for South Korean migrant workers in the 1970s and 1980s. The first group of 90 migrant workers arrived in 1975; from then until 1985, a total of 12,544 came to the country. The number reached its peak with 2,404 in 1980 but fell to less than a quarter that level by 1985. By 2011, the country had the Arab world's seventh-largest Korean population. From 356 in 2009, the number of South Korean nationals grew by 66% to 592 in 2011. Among them, 48 were international students, while 544 held other types of visas; none had become Jordanian nationals. The vast majority (556, or 94%) lived in Amman or its surroundings, with another 14 living at Irbid, and 22 in other places.

South Koreans in the country pursue a variety of professions. Some are interested in investing in construction projects in the country. The Korea International Cooperation Agency has been sending Korean language instructors to the University of Jordan and other universities in the country since 2002. More controversially, some of the South Koreans in Jordan are missionaries. By 2004, there were estimated to be at least 30 South Korean Christian missionary families living in Amman. Many had previously lived in Iraq but left the country under pressure from the South Korean government; after their arrival in Jordan, they often worked with Iraqi migrants and refugees in the country in an effort to convert them. One well-known South Korean who grew up in Jordan and naturalised as a citizen there is Won Ho Chung, an Arabic-speaking comedian who rose to fame in the region through the Axis of Evil Comedy Tour in 2007.

=== Kuwait ===
Koreans in Kuwait first arrived in 1975 as employees of South Korean construction companies, although the two countries did not establish formal relations until June 1979. By this time, Kuwait had already become the second-most popular Middle Eastern destination for Korean workers behind Saudi Arabia; by that time, 13,813 Korean workers had already come to Kuwait. However, Kuwait would soon lose the second-place position, being surpassed by Libya in 1981 and Iraq in 1982. Koreans in Kuwait generally did not receive a welcome from or assimilate to the local society; in common with Indians, Filipinos, and Pakistanis, they were described as being at the bottom of the social structure, "ridiculed and stripped of their rights". Nor did they spend much of their money locally; as meals and housing were provided for them in their work camps, it was estimated that they remitted 80% of their earnings back to South Korea. In spite of these difficulties, between 1975 and 1985, 63,898 South Korean workers came to Kuwait, and as late as 1990, roughly 10,000 were estimated to remain. Kuwait's only school for Korean nationals, the Kuwait Hangul School, was established in 1991. Most South Koreans returned home in the following decade, and as of 2011, only 1,000 South Korean nationals resided in the country. There were no known former South Korean nationals with Kuwaiti nationality; six were international students, and the remainder had other kinds of visas.

There was formerly a small contingent of South Korean soldiers in Kuwait, who numbered 170. South Korean civilian employees from the United States Army's Camp Casey in Dongducheon, Gyeonggi-do have been deployed to bases in Kuwait, including Camp Arifjan, in support of the US Army. In 2005, a group calling itself Kuwait Mujahideen claimed to have killed a Korean national as part of an attack on a US Army base in Umm Al-Hayman near Al Ahmadi.

North Korean companies have established a greater presence in Kuwait recent years, and the government of South Korea estimated that there are roughly three or four thousand North Korean construction workers in the country as of 2004. Air Koryo, the national airline of North Korea, began operating weekly flights between Pyongyang and Kuwait City in 2011.

=== Libya ===
Though Libya did not receive its first South Korean workers until 1977, it quickly became a popular destination; it was the only Arab country which experienced consistent growth in the number of Korean workers between 1981 and 1985, and by 1985 it had already become the Arab world's second most popular destination, with 23,138 arrivals from South Korea. In total, from 1977 until 1985, 103,953 South Koreans came to Libya. However, virtually all returned home, and as of 2009, it was estimated that only 854 South Korean nationals lived in the country. The South Korean population fell a further 87% in the next two years, leaving just 111 South Koreans in the country. Libya also has a Korean weekend school, founded in 2000; it enrolled 22 students from kindergarten to high school levels as of 2007.

North Korea also dispatched labourers to Libya in the 1980s and 1990s; a batch of Northern construction workers arrived in Libya in 2008. There were estimated to be roughly 200 North Korean expatriates in Libya as of 2011. Among them are construction workers, doctors, and nurses. They were not evacuated during the Libyan civil war that year. South Korean official media reported that Pyongyang had explicitly ordered their nationals in Libya and Egypt not to return home.

=== Qatar ===
South Korea and Qatar established diplomatic relations in 1974, and two years later, the South Korean embassy opened in Doha. Qatar was never a major destination for South Korean labourers; the first group of 636 workers did not arrive until 1976, and until 1985, only a total of 12,816 South Korean emigrants chose Qatar as their destination. Unlike in other countries in the region, Korean workers in Qatar did not just come as employees of Korean companies, but also as subcontractors of Japanese companies as well. Qatar Airways is one of the major employers of South Koreans in Qatar. As of 2011, South Korean consular statistics showed 2,184 of their nationals or former nationals living in the country, a decrease of 7.7% since 2009. 1,383 lived in Doha, 467 in Mesaieed, and 334 in Al Khor. Five were Qatari nationals, 112 were international students, and the remaining 2,067 had other types of visas.

In addition, an estimated 3,000 North Koreans lived in the country as of 2015. This accounted for approximately 40% of the working population of North Korean in the Persian Gulf region at that time. North Korean workers are reported to be among the lowest paid in the country, earning US$170/month, less than even Nepali migrants; they perform low-skilled work such as plastering and bricklaying. Their lives are subject to a great deal of official constraint, and they try to avoid contact with the South Koreans. There were no registered schools for Korean nationals in Qatar as of 2007.

=== Saudi Arabia ===
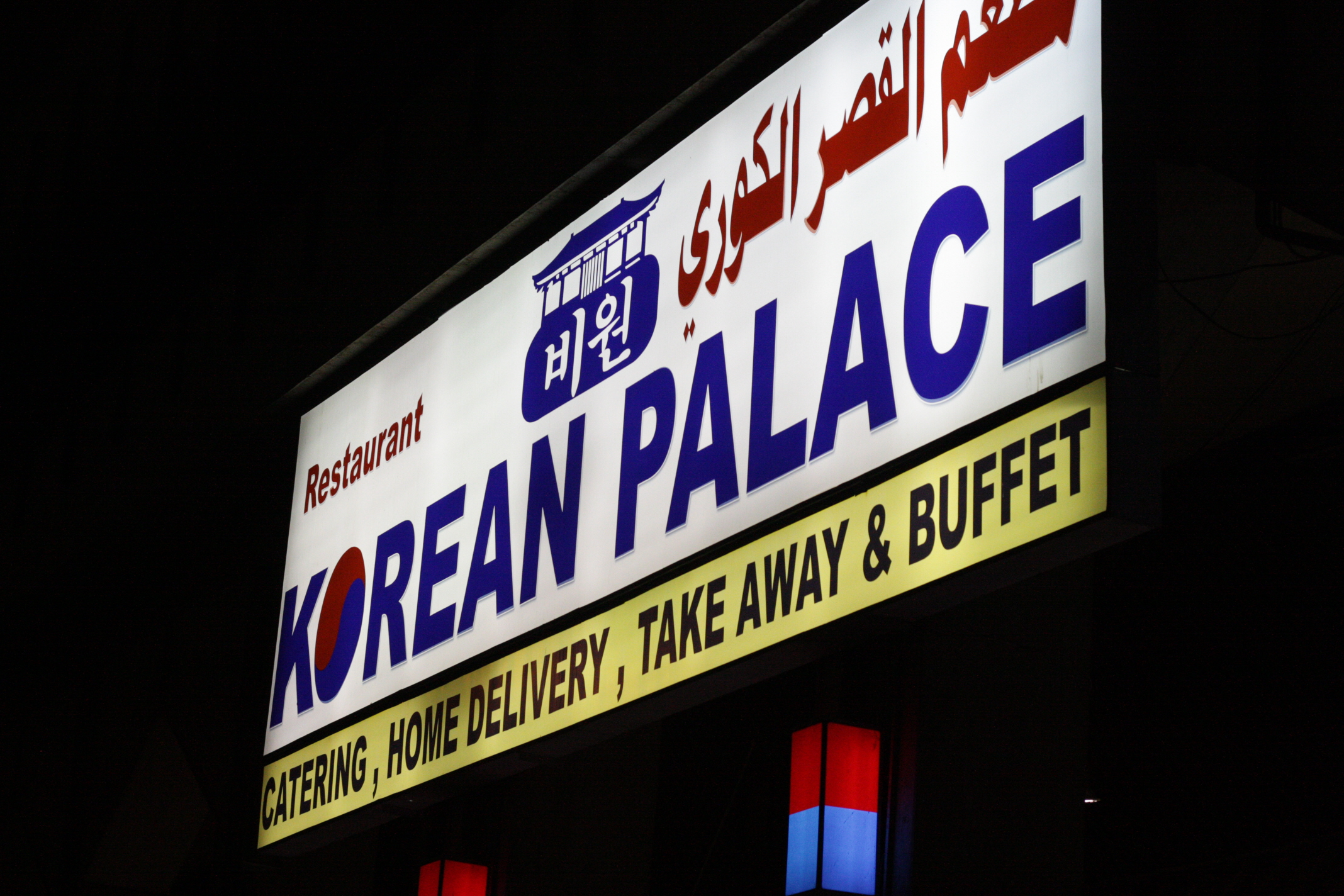
A sign for a Korean restaurant in Riyadh

South Korea established diplomatic relations with Saudi Arabia in 1962, and opened an embassy in Jeddah in 1973, which would later move to Riyadh. Labour relations were especially a source of friction in Saudi Arabia; one eyewitness account by an American expatriate claims that Hyundai's management called in the Saudi military to put down a strike at the Jubail port construction project, and that the army then proceeded to arrest and execute several workers. Korean workers were also not afforded the opportunity for much social contact with their host population, though a few did convert to Islam. Migration to the country would peak in 1982 and 1983, with over 122,000 South Koreans entering Saudi Arabia in each of those years, making up over 70% of Korean migration to the region. However, by 1985, the number of South Koreans entering Saudi Arabia had fallen to 58,924, paralleling a downward trend in the whole region. Saudi Arabia's first school for South Korean nationals was established in 1992 in Jeddah; as of 2007, it enrolled a total of 23 children at the kindergarten level.

In 1998, South Korea closed their consulate in Jeddah. There was no known North Korean presence, and North Korea does not maintain diplomatic relations with the kingdom. As of 2011, South Korean government figures showed 2,821 of their nationals or former nationals in the country, up by about 40% from 2,014 in 2011. This made them the second-largest Korean population in the region, having surpassed the population in Qatar which shrank during the same period. 43 were Saudi nationals, 65 were international students, and the remaining 2,713 had other kinds of visas. 1,479 lived in Dammam, 607 in Riyadh, 394 in Jeddah, 134 in Medina, 100 in Jizan, and 11 in 'Asir Province.

There are two Korean international schools in Saudi Arabia: Korean International School of Jeddah (KISJ; 젯다한국국제학교) and Korean School in Riyadh (리야드한국학교).

=== United Arab Emirates ===
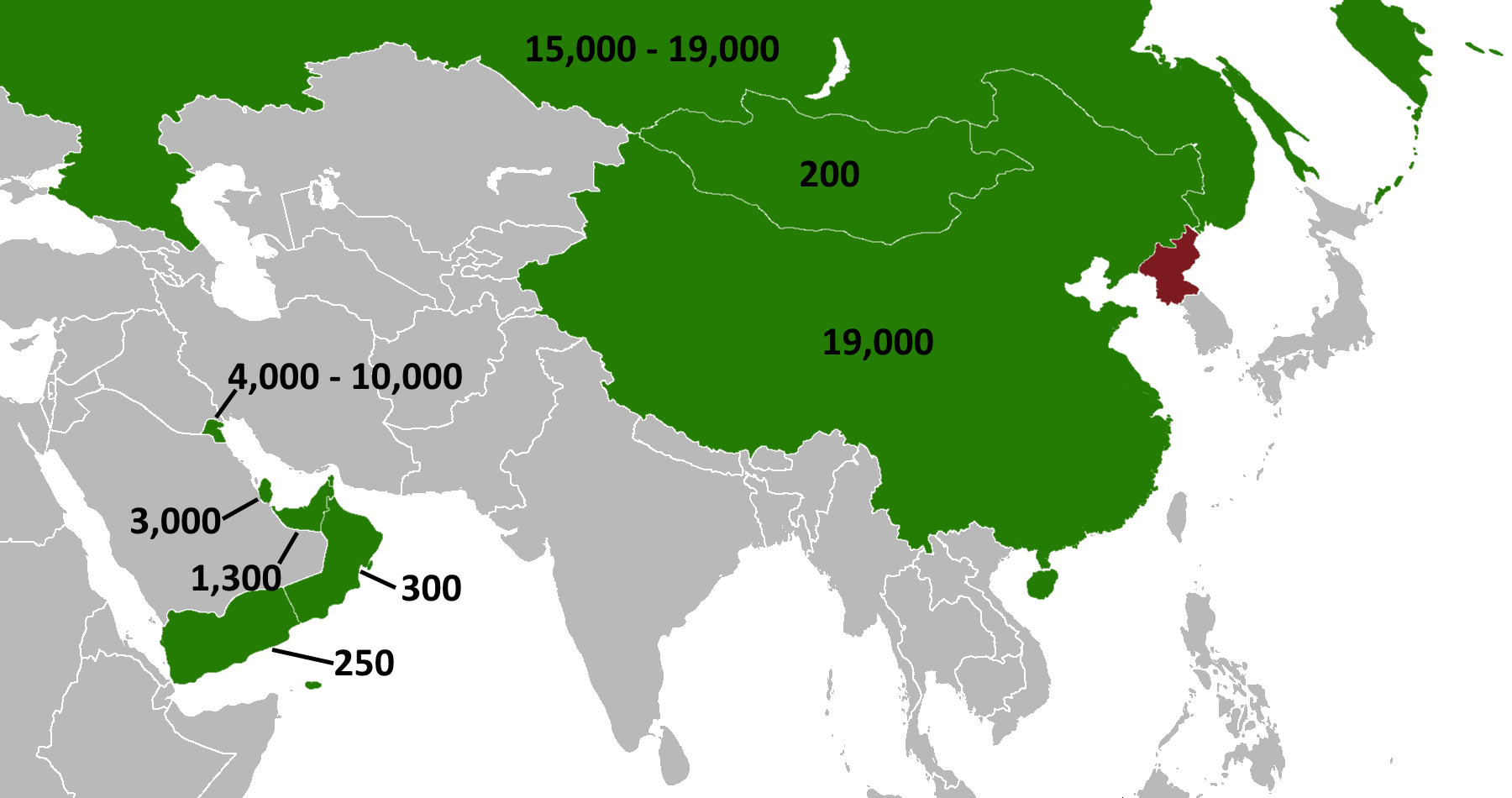
Number of North Korean migrant workers in Asia

The United Arab Emirates received a small contingent of Korean migrant workers in the late 1970s and early 1980s, but it was never a major destination. However, due to rapid growth since 2005, the country has come to have the Arab world's largest Korean population. As of 2008, there were roughly 2,500 South Koreans living in Dubai alone, largely businessmen working at the 90 Korean companies which operated in the country. Rapid population growth continued through 2011; by that year, South Korean consular statistics showed 5,665 of their nationals or former nationals living in the UAE, giving it the region's largest South Korean population, with more than twice as large a population as that in Saudi Arabia. Five were Emirati nationals, fourteen were international students, and the rest had other types of visas. 3,276 lived in Dubai, 1,982 in Abu Dhabi, 141 in Sharjah, 83 in Ajman, 67 in Ras al-Khaimah, 36 in Fujairah, and 22 in Umm al-Quwain.

Many South Koreans in the UAE are flight attendants working for the airline Emirates; the number of Koreans working for Emirates increased from 15 in 1998 to 620 as of 2007, mostly based out of Dubai. Dubai has the UAE's largest community of South Koreans. However, a consulate was not opened in Dubai until March 2008. In Abu Dhabi, Reem Investments plans to develop a residential complex for South Korean expatriates on Al Reem Island, and have engaged Gansam Architects of Seoul to design its 22,000 square metres (240,000 sq ft) cultural centre.

There are also believed to be roughly 1,300 North Korean workers in the UAE, primarily in Dubai and Abu Dhabi. They earn between US$300 and $500 per month, but have to make so-called "loyalty payments" of $150 to $250 to the North Korean government. This has sparked discontent among the workers; in response, the North Korean government has sent security agents to patrol North Korean work camps and keep an eye out for people making critical comments. In 2010, a branch of the Pyongyang Okryu Restaurant opened in Dubai, staffed by waitresses from North Korea; the restaurant earns hard currency to supplement the North Korean state budget.

=== Other countries ===
Other Arab countries that received Korean migrant workers during the late 1970s and early 1980s include Yemen, Oman, and Sudan. There are Korean weekend schools in Mauritania (Nouadhibou), Morocco (Rabat and Agadir) and Tunisia (Tunis).
