= Koreans in Guatemala =

Ethnic group

재과테말라 한인 Jae Gwatemalla Hanin Coreanos en Guatemala

Total population
- 12,918 (2011)

Regions with significant populations
- Guatemala City (El Pueblito, Monte María, Roosevelt)

Languages
- Korean, Guatemalan Spanish

Related ethnic groups
- Korean diaspora

Koreans in Guatemala form one of the newest and fastest-growing Korean diaspora communities in Latin America.

== Migration history ==
The first migrants from South Korea to Guatemala did not arrive in the country until 1985, more than two decades after South Korean mass migration to Latin America began. As recently as 1997, only 2,051 Koreans resided in the country, but by 2005, that number had almost quintupled to 9,944, surpassing the older community of Koreans in Paraguay and giving Guatemala the fourth-largest Korean population in the region, behind Brazil, Argentina and Mexico. From 2005 to 2009, the number of Koreans in the country remained roughly stable at 9,921 persons. However, in the following two years the number of South Korean nationals in the country grew by 30%, reaching 12,918 persons. Among them 3,101 were permanent residents, fifty-two were international students and 9,765 had other kinds of visas. The population exhibits gender imbalance, with 7,409 women (57%) compared to 5,509 men (43%), a sex ratio of 134 to 100. Almost all live in Guatemala City, with only 38 recorded as living in Antigua or other cities.

== Business and employment ==
The earliest migrants were involved in the textiles industry, setting up factories to produce garments for export to the United States market. From 1988 to 1991, fifty South Korean-owned maquilas opened in Guatemala. The value of their exports, at $150 million per year, comprised half of all Guatemalan apparel exports. As of 2001, there were thirty-three Korean restaurants in the capital; other Korean residents operate karaoke bars, mini-supermarkets, book cafes, and clothing stores. In some cases, wives and children remain in Guatemala doing business while their husbands return to Korea. Products from South Korean-owned businesses are reported to make up 10% of Guatemala's total exports.

== Community relations ==
Guatemalans perceive the Korean community as fairly insular and isolated. South Korean media portray the Korean community in Guatemala as living in constant fear of their lives due to endemic violence in the country, a portrayal which the Guatemalan embassy in Seoul strongly disputes. According to the Korean embassy, twenty-four Koreans have become the victims of violent crime in Guatemala between 2003 and 2008. In March 2009, a pair of South Korean businessmen Sang Park and Bang Mal-sum were murdered in a suburb of the capital. Because they are involved in international business and thus believed to be rich, South Koreans are perceived by the general population as attractive targets for kidnapping, especially in comparison to Americans. In total in 13 months up to February 2010 there were eight cases of murders of South Koreans, along with numerous kidnappings. In February 2010, 2 South Koreans who ran an illegal casino were arrested for the abduction and murder of Suong Kim, another South Korean who had won money in the casino.

== Organisations ==
There is an Association of Koreans in Guatemala (Asociación de Coreanos en Guatemala), headed by Lim Byung-yeol. The association has organised a variety of activities, including a sports day at Parque la Democracia in May 2011. That year, the association also began conducting a statistical survey of the community. There is also a Korean School of Guatemala (Colegio Coreano de Guatemala, 과테말라 한글학교), which had 29 teachers and 170 students as of 2010. Octavio Kang, a graduate of the Hankuk University of Foreign Studies, publishes a newspaper aimed at the community; about three-tenths of its articles are about Guatemala and the Korean community there, with the rest concerning happenings in South Korea. However, it has only 350 subscribers.
