= Paraguay–South Korea relations =

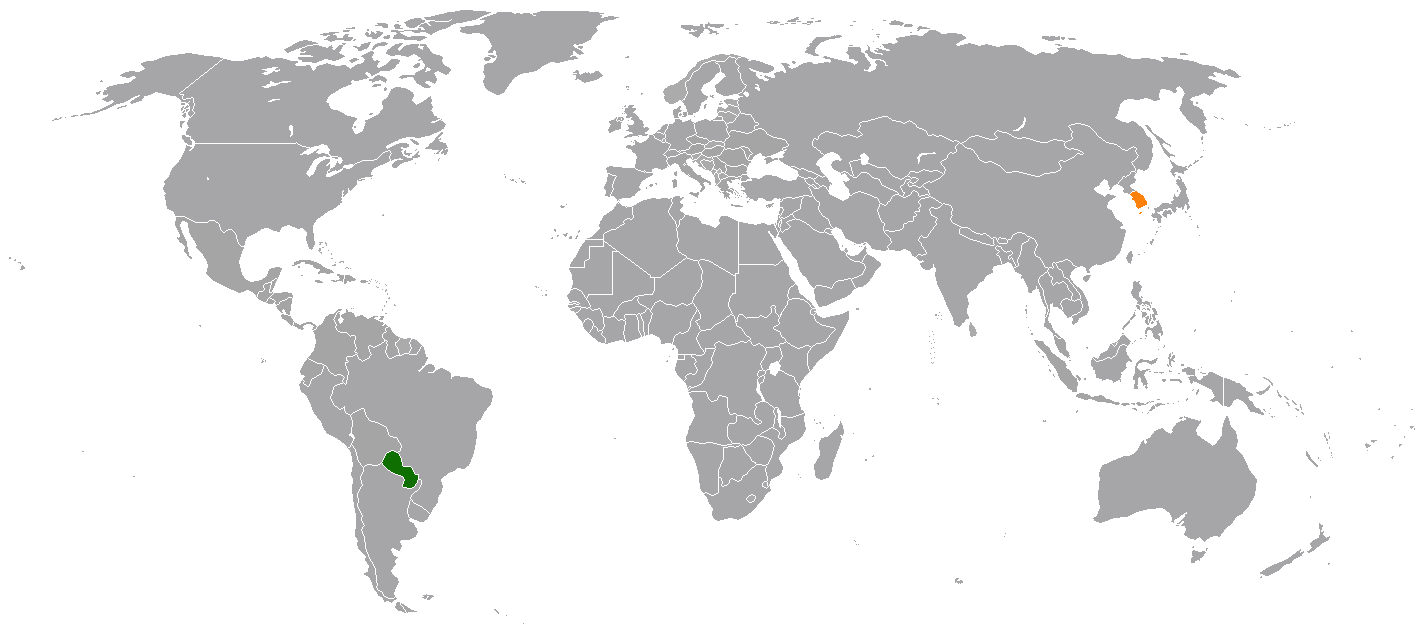

- Paraguay: South Korea

Paraguay–South Korea relations are foreign relations between Paraguay and South Korea. Both countries established diplomatic relations on June 15, 1962. Paraguay has an embassy in Seoul and South Korea has an embassy in Asunción. There are about 6,000 people of Korean descent living in Paraguay.
