= Koreans in Peru =

Ethnic group

Total population
- 1,305 (2011)

Regions with significant populations
- Lima

Languages
- Peruvian Spanish, Korean

Religion
- Protestantism, Roman Catholicism

Related ethnic groups
- Korean diaspora

Koreans in Peru (Spanish: coreanos en Perú; Korean: 재페루한인) formed Latin America's seventh-largest Korean diaspora community as of 2011, according to the statistics of South Korea's Ministry of Foreign Affairs and Trade. They are relatively small in size compared to the other Asian communities in Peru.

== Migration history ==
The first Korean migrant to Peru is believed to have been Park Man-bok, who was invited to Peru to coach the women's national volleyball team in 1972. Under his tutelage, the team would go on to a variety of successes in the 1980s, culminating in the winning of a silver medal for their country at the 1988 Summer Olympics in Seoul.

However, few of Park's countrymen joined him in Peru; as late as 1985, there were only nine Korean families resident in the country, totalling 27 individuals. A large portion did not come directly from Korea, but had instead first settled in Bolivia, Paraguay, or Chile. The population began to increase in 1993, as the economic and social situation in Peru stabilised; during the 1990s, roughly two or three new Korean families arrived in Peru every month. However, after 1997, their population fell by nearly 56% from 1,774 to just 788 by 2005, largely due to outward migration to Mexico and Guatemala in 1998 and 1999; some of those who had arrived via Chile also returned there.

By 2011, Peru's Korean population had recovered slightly to 1,305. According to South Korean government statistics, 24 took up Peruvian nationality, 342 stayed in Peru as permanent residents, 30 were international students, and the remaining 909 had other kinds of visas.

In May 2020, the Korean community in the country attracted media headlines after donating more than 80,000 soles worth of personal protective equipment (PPE) for health professionals fighting the coronavirus pandemic in affected regions in the north and east of the country.

== Professions ==
The economic profile of the Korean community in Peru is widely varied and has continued to shift over the years. In the 1980s, many were involved in calamari fishing. The roughly 900 Koreans resident in Peru in 2001 included among their number 500 business people, 90 representatives of the South Korean government, 48 factory owners, 39 religious workers, and 25 sportspeople. Many businesspeople are involved in the import of products from South Korea, especially used cars, computers, and construction equipment; however, the largest portion of Koreans in Peru are involved with the textile industry.

Aside from Park Man-bok, other Koreans have made notable contributions to sport in Peru. Lee Ki-Hyung, a 1973 taekwondo world champion, went on to work as a martial arts instructor in the Peruvian Air Force. Chung Eui-Hwang, 9th dan black belt, arrived in Peru in 1979, and from then until 1989 trained the Military Academy of Chorrillos, the Peruvian Commando Special Forces, the Technical Academy of the Military, and the First Brigade of the Special Forces. These efforts began the trend of popularisation of taekwondo in Peru, which grew to 30,000 practitioners as of 2005.

== Politics ==
Despite the small size of its Korean population, Peru was the site of a major precedent for Korean immigrants' political integration when the city of Chanchamayo, Junín elected Mario Jung (정흥원, also spelled Mario Yung) as its mayor in 2011. Jung thus became the first mayor of Korean descent not just in Peru but in all of South America, even though neighbouring countries such as Brazil have larger Korean populations and a much longer history of migration from Korea. Jung, a South Korean citizen, had originally settled in Argentina in 1986 before coming to Peru in 1996. Politically, Jung is a supporter of Fujimorism, and was known locally for his charitable work with the poor. Peruvian law requires that the president and members of Congress be Peruvian citizens, but does not place any requirements on lower-level politicians. Jung's inauguration was attended by South Korean consul Lee You-bum on behalf of ambassador Han Byung-kil.

== Religion ==
Unlike the surrounding population, many Koreans in Peru are Protestant rather than Catholic. The largest Korean church in Peru, the Iglesia Evangélica Coreana, claims roughly 250 attendees. However, Korean Catholics in Peru also have a parish devoted to them, the Parroquia San Andrés Kim, named for the Korean saint Andrew Kim Taegon.
