= Koreans in South Africa =

- (South Korea) (South Africa)

Total population
- 3,300 (2014)

Regions with significant populations
- Johannesburg, Cape Town

Languages
- South African English, Afrikaans and Korean

Religion
- Mostly Christianity, Mahayana Buddhism

Related ethnic groups
- Korean diaspora

Koreans in South Africa form the largest Korean diaspora community on the African continent and the 29th-largest in the world, ahead of Koreans in Spain and behind Koreans in Italy.

== History ==
South Africa had considered importing labourers from Korea as early as 1903 to control rising mining wages, but eventually decided on Chinese workers instead. The Immigration Act of 1913 classified all Asians as "prohibited immigrants", thus preventing them from settling in the country or conducting commercial activities there. In 1930, when then-Minister of the Interior D. F. Malan made the decision to exclude Japanese from the "prohibited immigrants" category as defined by the 1913 Act, Koreans remained prohibited immigrants, though Jan Smuts angrily protested that the exemption represented a precedent for opening the door to Koreans and Chinese as well. In fact, it came to pass as Smuts predicted: Koreans were removed from the "prohibited immigrants" category in the 1960s.

However, the Korean community in South Africa only really began to take shape after the 1992 establishment of relations between South Korea and South Africa. South Korean companies began sending expatriate employees and their families to the country, and international students found themselves able to enroll in South African universities. A number of independent migrants came as well; they typically set up small businesses in the import/export, hospitality, car repair, and photography sectors.

They are mainly found in the suburbs of Johannesburg.

== Demography ==
From 658 people in 1997—19% of all Koreans on the continent and little larger than the Korean community of 589 people in Ghana—their numbers doubled to 1,356 by 2001 and grew again by 155% to 3,452 in 2005, making then 44% of all Koreans in Africa and nearly five times the size of the next-largest community. Most are located in Johannesburg, with a smaller community in Cape Town. South Korean tourists generally choose Cape Town as their primary destination, due to the Table Mountain and other famous natural attractions. By 2011, the Korean population of South Africa had grown another 9% to 4,186. Of South Korean nationals or former nationals in the country, 126 had South African nationality, 1,227 were permanent residents, 954 were international students, and the remaining 1,879 had other types of visas. Most resided in or Gauteng (2,240 people, 54% of all Koreans in the country) or Western Cape (1,800, or 43%). The Korean communities in those two provinces exhibit differing demographic characteristics: the community in Western Cape has a higher proportion of international students, and a sex ratio of 0.75 men for every woman; the community in Gauteng has a higher proportion of permanent residents, and a sex ratio of 1.77 men for every woman.

In 2010, South Korean news reports quoted South Korea's Ministry of Unification as claiming that as many as 1,000 North Korean guestworkers were in South Africa to assist in the construction of stadiums for the 2010 FIFA World Cup, including FNB Stadium (Soccer City). However, in interviews with South African media, project managers at the sites in question denied the reports.

== Education ==
Since the 1990s, many South Koreans have chosen South Africa as a destination for English as a Foreign Language courses. As of 2011, there were 954 South Koreans in South Africa on international student visas, among them 590 in Western Cape province, and 360 in Gauteng province. Not all have just gone to the major cities; for example, Potchefstroom is also one of their major destinations, due to the presence of the Potchefstroom Campus of the North-West University, and in some cases even whole families have moved there for their children's education. There are several universities with more than 50 Korean students. Aside from English, inexpensive golf lessons are another attraction for Korean international students; a 2004 Yonhap News Agency report estimated that there were roughly 50 South Korean golf students in the country.

In total, more than a quarter of the Korean population in South Africa may consist of students or family members who moved to the country primarily to give their children the opportunity for an English-language education. Basic school costs are higher than those in South Korea, but conversely South Korean expatriates in South Africa can spend less on private cram schools, instead allowing their children to take advantage of a broader range of after-school activities. However, South Korean children who have gone through the more relaxed South African educational system sometimes find it difficult to adjust to the fast pace and high demands of schooling once they return to their native country.

Koreans in South Africa have also established three weekend schools to educate their children in Korean language and culture. The Johannesburg Hangul School was the earliest; it was founded in March 1992 by Jeong Eun-il, who continues to serve as principal. It employed 14 teachers and enrolled 14 kindergarteners, 55 elementary school students, and 13 middle school students. The next school was the Pretoria Hangul School, founded in February 1995 by Choe Jong-o; it shares facilities with the Lynnwood Dutch Reformed Church. It has 8 teachers, 13 kindergarteners, 26 elementary school students, and 7 middle school students. Finally, the Cape Town Hangul School was founded in 2001 by the Mariners' Church (외항선교회). It is the smallest of the three Korean schools, but also the only one with a high school division; it enrols 9 kindergarteners, 12 elementary school students, 3 middle school students, and 6 high school students. There are also some Koreans studying in Rhodes University.

== Religion ==
There are eight Korean churches in South Africa, staffed by pastors sent from parent churches in South Korea. Aside from their religious functions, they often serve as community centres for Korean migrants and expatriates. Most are Protestant, but a Korean Catholic Church also opened in Glenferness, Johannesburg in 2009. At the end of 2006, there were 79 South Korean Christian missionary families and 16 individual South Korean missionaries in South Africa totalling 174 people, making up nearly 70% of all South Korean missionaries in southern Africa. Most South Korean churches and organisations began their activities in South Africa in the 1980s and 1990s. There are also six Korean Buddhist temples in the country.

== Community relations ==
Crime in South Africa has not left the Korean community untouched; one widely reported case was the 1999 murder of Kwon Yong-koo, the president of Daewoo Motor South Africa, in the driveway of his home in Johannesburg. He was found there in his car the following morning. However, this was suspected to be a targeted killing rather than a random carjacking attempt. At one point, prosecutors even claimed to have evidence implicating a Zimbabwean businessman with close ties to Robert Mugabe in the killing. In 2007, a Korean woman was found dead in her Cape Town home with her hands and feet bound with rope. No Koreans were victimised during the May 2008 anti-immigrant violence.
