= Mariner's Church (disambiguation) =

The Mariner's Church (or Mariners' Church or Mariners Church) may refer to the following congregations or buildings:

== United States ==
- Mariners Church of Irvine, California
- Mariner's Church (Portland, Maine)
- Mariners' Church of Detroit, Michigan
- Mariners' Church of Philadelphia, Pennsylvania, which was absorbed into the Old Pine Street Church in 1965

== Other places ==
- Mariners' Church, The Rocks, in Sydney, Australia
- Mariners' Church, Dún Laoghaire, Co. Dublin, Ireland
- Mariners' Church, Leith, Edinburgh, Scotland, also known as St Ninian's Church, now merged with other congregations to form North Leith Parish Church
