= Korean diaspora =

People of Korean descent not in Korea

Total population
- 7,081,510 (2023)

Regions with significant populations
- United States: 2,615,419
- China: 2,109,727
- Japan: 802,118
- Canada: 218,140
- Vietnam: 178,122
- Uzbekistan: 174,490
- Australia: 165,000
- Russia: 124,811
- Kazakhstan: 121,130
- Germany: 49,683
- Brazil: 47,544
- United Kingdom: 39,097
- Philippines: 34,148
- New Zealand: 31,810
- France: 27,055
- Indonesia: 25,153
- Argentina: 25,000
- Singapore: 21,203
- Thailand: 20,353
- Kyrgyzstan: 20,229
- Hong Kong: 13,288
- Mexico: 13,158
- Malaysia: 13,152
- Sweden: 13,000
- Guatemala: 12,918
- Ukraine: 12,765
- India: 11,360
- Netherlands: 11,000
- United Arab Emirates: 11,000
- Denmark: 8,844
- Cambodia: 7,800
- Norway: 6,670
- Paraguay: 5,205
- Saudi Arabia: 5,189
- Taiwan: 5,132
- Guam: 5,016
- Italy: 5,000
- Belgium: 5,000
- Spain: 4,080
- Switzerland: 4,000
- Brunei: 3,771
- Poland: 3,443
- South Africa: 3,300
- Qatar: 3,000
- Austria: 3,000
- Czech Republic: 3,000
- Turkey: 2,686
- Chile: 2,510
- Mongolia: 2,284
- Northern Marianas: 2,281

Languages
- Predominantly Korean, English, Chinese, and Russian, among others

Religion
- Predominantly: Irreligious; Minorities: Korean Buddhism, Korean shamanism, Cheondoism, Korean Confucianism, Christianity (Roman Catholicism, Protestantism) and Unification Church

Related ethnic groups
- Koreans (including North Koreans, South Koreans, Jejuans, Koryo-saram, Sakhalin Koreans), Manchus

- Korean diaspora
- Hangul: 한인
- Hanja: 韓人
- RR: Hanin
- MR: Hanin

North Korean name
- Hangul: 해외동포
- Hanja: 海外同胞
- RR: haeoedongpo
- MR: haeoedongp'o

South Korean name
- Hangul: 재외동포
- Hanja: 在外同胞
- RR: jaeoedongpo
- MR: chaeoedongp'o

The Korean diaspora consists of around 7.3 million people, descendants of emigrants from the Korean Peninsula across various waves of migration. Around 86% of overseas Koreans live in six countries: the United States, China, Japan, Canada, Vietnam and Uzbekistan. Other countries with greater than 0.5% Korean minorities include Brazil, Russia, Kazakhstan, Vietnam, the Philippines, and Indonesia. All of these figures include both permanent and temporary migrants. Outside of Continental and East Asia, there are sizeable Korean communities that have formed in Germany, the United Kingdom, France, the United States, Canada, Australia, and New Zealand.

== Terminology ==
There are currently a number of official and unofficial appellations used by the authorities of the two Korean states, as well as a number of Korean institutions for Korean nationals, expatriates, and descendants living abroad. Thus, there is no single name for the Korean diaspora.

The historically used term gyopo (Korean: 교포; Hanja: 僑胞), also spelled kyopo, meaning "nationals") has come to have negative connotations as referring to people who, as a result of living as sojourners outside the "home country", have lost touch with their Korean roots. As a result, others prefer to use the term dongpo (동포; 同胞), meaning "brethren" or "people of the same ancestry"). Dongpo has a more transnational implication, emphasising links among various overseas Korean groups, while gyopo has more of a purely national connotation referring to the Korean state. Another recently popularized term is gyomin (교민; 僑民; lit. 'immigrants'), although it is usually reserved for Korean-born citizens that have moved abroad in search of work, and as such is rarely used as a term to refer to the entire diaspora.

In North Korea, Korean nationals living outside Korea are called haeoe gungmin (해외국민), whereas South Korea uses the term jaeoe gungmin (재외국민) to refer to the entire Korean diaspora. Both terms translate to "overseas national(s)."

== History ==
Before the modern era, Korea had been a territorially stable polity for centuries. Significant migration out of Korea did not begin until the late 19th century.

=== Japanese and Portuguese slave trade ===
During the 1592–1598 Imjin War, tens of thousands of enslaved Koreans were taken from Korea to Japan, with the first shipment being taken in October 1592. Some were allowed to return to Korea, but many were made to stay in Japan, with the famous example of Korean samurai Wakita Naokata (Kim Yŏch'ŏl). Some were made saints in the 17th-century (205 Martyrs of Japan). The Portuguese then sent some of them elsewhere, namely Portuguese Macau. A community of several thousand Koreans formed near the Church of Saint Paul. Others were sent to Manila in the Spanish Philippines, at least one to Goa, and likely one (Thome Corea) to Ambon Island, where he died in 1623. An António Corea was taken to Florence and Rome, and is possibly the first Korean to set foot in Europe.

The international trade of Korean slaves declined shortly after the end of the Japanese invasions due to a number of prohibitions from various Japanese, Catholic, and Spanish and Portuguese colonial authorities. Despite the near halt in their export from Japan, their labor continued to be used.

=== Rise ===
Large-scale emigration from Korea began as early as the mid-1860s, mainly into the Russian Far East and Northeast China; these emigrants became the ancestors of the two million Koreans in China and several hundred thousand Koryo-saram.

=== Korea under Japanese rule ===
During the Japanese colonial period of 1910–1945, Koreans were often recruited or forced into indentured servitude to work in mainland Japan, Karafuto Prefecture (Sakhalin) and Manchukuo, especially in the 1930s and early 1940s; the ones who chose to remain in Japan at the end of the war became known as Zainichi Koreans, while the roughly 40 thousand who were trapped in Karafuto after the Soviet invasion are typically referred to as Sakhalin Koreans. According to the statistics at Immigration Bureau of Japan, there were 901,284 Koreans resident in Japan as of 2005, of whom 515,570 were permanent residents and another 284,840 were naturalized citizens.

Aside from migration within the Empire of Japan or its puppet state of Manchukuo, some Koreans also escaped Japanese-ruled territory entirely, heading to Shanghai, a major centre of the Korean independence movement or to the already-established Korean communities of the Russian Far East. However, the latter would find themselves deported to Central Asia in 1938.

=== After independence ===
Korea gained its independence after the Surrender of Japan in 1945, after World War II, but was divided into North and South. Korean emigration to the United States is known to have begun as early as 1903, but the Korean American community did not grow to a significant size until after the passage of the Immigration Reform Act of 1965. Between 1.5 and 2 million Koreans now live in the United States, mostly in metropolitan areas. A handful are descended from laborers who migrated to Hawaii in the late 19th and early 20th centuries. A significant number are descended from orphans of the Korean War, in which the United States was a major ally of South Korea and provided the bulk of the United Nations troops that served there. Thousands were adopted by American (mostly Caucasian) families in the years following the war, when their plight was covered on television. The vast majority, however, immigrated or are descended from those who immigrated after the Hart-Cellar Act of 1965 abolished national immigration quotas.

After the establishment of the People's Republic of China in 1949, ethnic Koreans in China, Joseonjok in Korean and Chaoxianzu in Mandarin Chinese became officially recognised as one of the 56 ethnic groups of the country. They are considered to be one of the "major minorities". Their population grew to about 2 million; they stayed mostly in Northeastern China, where their ancestors had initially settled. Their largest population was concentrated in the Yanbian Korean Autonomous Prefecture in Jilin, where they numbered 854,000 in 1997.

Europe and other parts of the Americas were also minor destinations for post-war Korean emigration. Korean immigration to South America was documented as early as the 1950s; North Korean prisoners of war chose to emigrate to Chile in 1953 and Argentina in 1956 under the auspices of the Red Cross. However, the majority of Korean settlements occurred in the late 1960s. As the South Korean economy continued to expand in the 1980s, investors from South Korea came to South America and established small businesses in the textiles industry. Korean immigrants were increasingly settling in urban centers of Bolivia, Chile, Colombia, Ecuador, Paraguay, Uruguay and Venezuela, although return migration from South America back to Korea has ensued since then.

In the 1970s, however, Japan and the United States remained the top two destinations for South Korean emigrants, with each receiving more than a quarter of all emigration; the Middle East became the third most popular destination, with more than 800,000 Koreans going to Saudi Arabia between 1975 and 1985 and another 26,000 Koreans going to Iran. In contrast, aside from Germany (1.7% of all South Korean emigration in 1977) and Paraguay (1.0%), no European or American destinations were even in the top ten for emigrants. The cultural and stylistic diversity of the Korean diaspora is documented and celebrated in the work of fine-art photographer CYJO, in her Kyopo Project, a photographic study of over 200 people of Korean descent.

=== Emerging trends in emigration from Korea ===
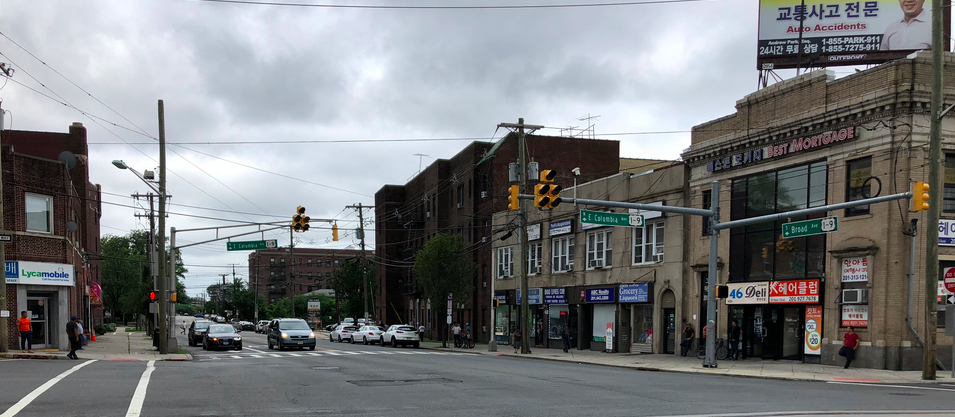
Bergen County, New Jersey, across the George Washington Bridge from New York City, is a growing hub and home to all of the nation's top ten municipalities by percentage of Korean population, led (above) by Palisades Park, the municipality with the highest density of ethnic Koreans in the Western Hemisphere. Displaying ubiquitous Hangul signage and known as the Korean Village, Palisades Park uniquely comprises a Korean majority, at 53.7% of the borough's population in 2022. with both the highest Korean-American density and percentage of any municipality in the United States.

South Korean media reports on the riots increased public awareness of the long working hours and harsh conditions faced by immigrants to the United States in the 1990s. Although immigration to the United States briefly became less attractive as a result of the 1992 Los Angeles riots, during which many Korean American immigrants saw their businesses destroyed by looters, the Los Angeles and New York City metropolitan areas still contain by far the largest populations of ethnic Koreans outside Korea and continue to attract the largest share of Korean immigrants. In fact, the per capita Korean population of Bergen County, New Jersey, in the New York Metropolitan Area, at 6.5% as of 2022, is the highest of any county in the United States, including all of the nation's top ten municipalities by percentage of Korean population per the 2010 U.S. census, while the concentration of Korean Americans in Palisades Park, New Jersey, within Bergen County, is both the highest density and percentage of any municipality in the United States, at 53.7% of the borough's population in 2022.

Since the early 2000s, a substantial number of affluent Korean American professionals have settled in Bergen County, which is home to North American headquarters operations of South Korean chaebols including Samsung, LG Corp, and Hanjin Shipping, and have founded various academically and communally supportive organizations, including the Korean Parent Partnership Organization at the Bergen County Academies magnet high school and The Korean-American Association of New Jersey. Holy Name Medical Center in Teaneck, New Jersey, within Bergen County, has undertaken an ambitious effort to provide comprehensive health care services to underinsured and uninsured Korean patients from a wide area with its growing Korean Medical Program, drawing over 1,500 ethnic Korean patients to its annual health festival. Bergen County's Broad Avenue Koreatown in Palisades Park has emerged as a dominant nexus of Korean American culture, has been referred to as a "Korean food walk of fame", with diverse offerings, incorporating the highest concentration of Korean restaurants within a one-mile radius in the United States and Broad Avenue has evolved into a Korean dessert destination as well; and its Senior Citizens Center in Palisades Park provides a popular gathering place where even Korean grandmothers were noted to follow the dance trend of the worldwide viral hit Gangnam Style by South Korean "K-pop" rapper Psy in September 2012; while the nearby Fort Lee Koreatown is also emerging as such. The Chusok Korean Thanksgiving harvest festival has become an annual tradition in Bergen County, attended by several tens of thousands. In January 2019, Christopher Chung was sworn in as the first Korean mayor of Palisades Park and the first mayor from the Korean diaspora in Bergen County.

Bergen County's growing Korean community was cited by county executive Kathleen Donovan in the context of Hackensack, New Jersey attorney Jae Y. Kim's appointment to Central Municipal Court judgeship in January 2011. Subsequently, in January 2012, the New Jersey Governor Chris Christie nominated attorney Phillip Kwon of Bergen County for New Jersey Supreme Court justice, although this nomination was rejected by the state's Senate Judiciary Committee, and in July 2012, Kwon was appointed instead as deputy general counsel of the Port Authority of New York and New Jersey. According to The Record of Bergen County, the U.S. Census Bureau has determined the county's Korean American population – 2010 census figures put it at 56,773 (increasing to 63,247 by the 2011 American Community Survey) – has grown enough to warrant language assistance during elections and Bergen County's Koreans have earned significant political respect. As of May 2014, Korean Americans had garnered at least four borough council seats in Bergen County. Described as a historic event, the US$6 million Korean Community Center opened in Tenafly, New Jersey in January 2015, aimed at integrating Bergen County's Korean community into the mainstream.

With the development of the South Korean economy, the focus of emigration from Korea began to shift from developed nations towards developing nations, prior to repatriation back to Korea. With the 1992 normalisation of diplomatic relations between China and South Korea, many citizens of South Korea started to settle instead in China, attracted by business opportunities generated by the reform and opening up of China and the low cost of living. Large new communities of South Koreans have formed in Beijing, Shanghai, and Qingdao; as of 2006, their population is estimated to be between 300,000 and 400,000. There is also a small community of Koreans in Hong Kong, mostly migrant workers and their families; according to Hong Kong's 2001 census, they numbered roughly 5,200, making them the 12th-largest ethnic minority group. Southeast Asia has also seen an influx of South Koreans. Koreans in Vietnam have grown in number to around 30,000 since the 1992 normalisation of diplomatic relations, making them Vietnam's second-largest foreign community after the Taiwanese. Korean migration to the Philippines increased in the early 2000s due to the tropical climate and low cost of living compared to South Korea, although this diaspora has declined since 2010; 370,000 Koreans visited the country in 2004 and roughly 46,000 Korean immigrants live there permanently. Though smaller, the number of Koreans in Cambodia has also grown rapidly, almost quadrupling between 2005 and 2009. They mostly reside in Phnom Penh, with a smaller number in Siem Reap. They are largely investors involved in the construction industry, though there are also some missionaries and NGO workers. Koreatown, Manhattan in New York City has become described as the "Korean Times Square" and has emerged as the international economic outpost for the Korean chaebol.

== Return migration ==
Koreans born or settled overseas have been migrating back to both North and South Korea ever since the restoration of Korean independence; perhaps the most famous example is Kim Jong Il, born in Vyatskoye, Khabarovsk Krai, Russia, where his father Kim Il Sung had been serving in the Red Army. Postwar migrations of Koreans from throughout the Empire of Japan back to the Korean Peninsula were characterized both bureaucratically and popularly as "repatriation", a restoration of the congruence between the Korean population and its territory. The pre-colonial Korean state had not clearly laid out the boundaries or criteria determining who was a citizen; however, the Japanese colonial government had registered all Koreans in a separate family registry, a separation which continued even if an individual Korean migrated to Manchuria or Japan; thus North and South Korea had a clear legal definition of who was a repatriating Korean, and did not have to create any special legal categories of national membership for them, the way Germany had done for post-World War II German expellees. There has also been a return migration of Korean Brazilians back to Korea, spurred by the increasing violence in Brazil.

The largest-scale repatriation activities took place in Japan, where Chongryon sponsored the return of Zainichi Korean residents to North Korea; beginning in the late 1950s and early 1960s, with a trickle of repatriates continuing until as late as 1984, nearly 90,000 Zainichi Koreans resettled in the reclusive communist state, though their ancestral homes were in South Korea. However, word of the difficult economic and political conditions filtered back to Japan, decreasing the popularity of this option. Around one hundred such repatriates are believed to have later escaped from North Korea; the most famous is Kang Chol-Hwan, who published a book about his experience, The Aquariums of Pyongyang. South Korea, however, was a popular destination for Koreans who had settled in Manchukuo during the colonial period; returnees from Manchukuo such as Park Chung Hee and Chun Doo-hwan had a large influence on the process of nation-building in South Korea.

Until the 1980s, Soviet Koreans did not repatriate in any large numbers and played little role in defining the boundaries of membership in the Korean nation. However, roughly 1,000 Sakhalin Koreans are also estimated to have independently repatriated to the North in the decades after the end of World War II, when returning to their ancestral homes in the South was not an option due to the lack of Soviet relations with the South and Japan's refusal to grant them transit rights. In 1985, Japan began to fund the return of Sakhalin Koreans to South Korea; however, only an additional 1,500 took this offer, with the vast majority of the population remaining on the island of Sakhalin or moving to the Russian Far East instead.

With the rise of the South Korean economy in the 1980s, economic motivations became increasingly prevalent in overseas Koreans' decisions of whether to repatriate and in which part of the peninsula to settle. 356,790 Chinese citizens have migrated to South Korea since the reform and opening up of China; almost two-thirds are estimated to be Chaoxianzu. Similarly, some Koryo-saram from Central Asia have also moved to South Korea as guest workers, to take advantage of the high wages offered by the growing economy; remittances from South Korea to Uzbekistan, for example, were estimated to exceed US$100 million in 2005. Return migration through arranged marriage is another option, portrayed in the 2005 South Korean film Wedding Campaign, directed by Hwang Byung-kook. However, the Koryo-saram often face the most difficulty integrating into Korean society due to their poor command of the Korean language and the fact that their dialect, Koryo-mar, differs significantly from the Seoul dialect considered standard in the South.

Return migration from the United States has been much less common than that from Japan or the former Soviet Union, as the economic push factor was far less than in 1960s Japan or post-Soviet collapse Central Asia. Korean American return migrants have predominantly been entertainers who were either recruited by South Korean talent agencies or had chosen to move there due to the lack of opportunities in the United States; prominent examples include Jae Chong, Johan Kim and Joon Lee (of R&B trio Solid), singers Joon Park (of K-pop group g.o.d) and Brian Joo (of R&B duo Fly to the Sky), hip hop artist and songwriter Jay Park and model and actor Daniel Henney (who initially spoke no Korean).

Another example of return migration to South Korea are members of the Korean diaspora who enter the K-pop music genre and industry—which has seen significant international success as part of the Korean wave—mostly through its idol trainee system, through which they may be selected to join K-pop groups. Notable examples include: Joshua Hong, born in the United States and member of boy band Seventeen; and Rosé, born in New Zealand and member of girl group Blackpink.

Members of the Korean diaspora are able to apply to be buried in Korea upon their death as well. National Mang-Hyang Cemetery in Cheonan now holds the remains of Koreans from around the world, including those who died decades before the cemetery's creation in 1976.

== North Korean diaspora ==
These are the numbers of North Korean citizens living abroad in various countries:

Destination	Number	Year	Ref.
China	20,000	2025	
Italy	69	2026	
Sweden	16	2026	
Japan	22,201	2025	
Russia	35,839	2026	
Czech Republic	6	2026	
Cameroon	40	2024	
Austria	7	2026	
Belarus	19	2019	
Germany	375	2025	
Luxembourg	6	2026	
Mongolia	7	2020	
Poland	2	2026	
France	3	2026	
Switzerland	8	2026	
Bulgaria	14	2026	
Taiwan	1	2026	
United Kingdom	10	2026	
Slovenia	1	2025	
Ireland	8	2022	
Romania	4	2026	
Denmark	23	2026	
Uganda	8	2024	
Thailand	5	2025	
Singapore	6	2025	

== See also ==
- Asian Latin Americans
- Korean diaspora nationalism
- Koreans in Japan
