= South Korea–Spain relations =

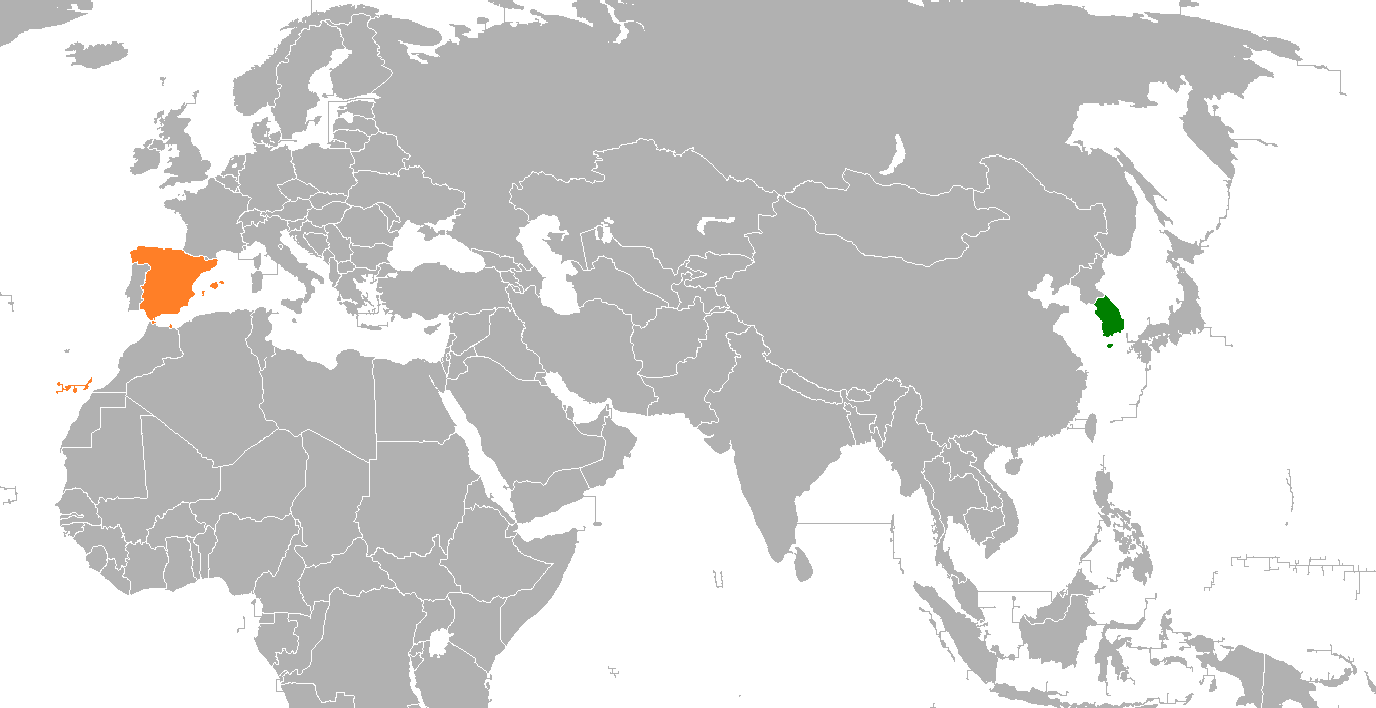
- South Korea: Spain

South Korea–Spain relations are the bilateral and diplomatic relations between these two countries. Spain has an embassy in Seoul. South Korea has an embassy in Madrid and a consulate general in Barcelona and Las Palmas de Gran Canaria. The bilateral relations are good and friendly.

== Diplomatic relations ==
The establishment of diplomatic relations between Spain and the Republic of Korea dates back to March 1950. In 2010, the 60th anniversary of the establishment of diplomatic relations was celebrated. The Spanish king and queen made a state visit to South Korea in October 1996 and Prime Minister José María Aznar visited in October 2000, followed by further exchanges. The State visit to Spain by President Roh Moo-hyun, in February 2007, helped to consolidate the bilateral relationship between both countries, allowing the signing of instruments such as the Memorandum of Understanding of Political Dialogue or the Joint Declaration. The Minister of Foreign Affairs and Cooperation, Miguel Ángel Moratinos, visited Korea on March 25 on 2009. During their visit, a Judicial Assistance Agreement in Criminal Matters and an Agreement on Protection of Classified Military Information were signed.
The President of the Republic of Korea, Moon Jae-In and Mrs. Kim Jung-sook, are on a State Visit to Spain on June 15 and 16.

== Economic relations ==
The increase in trade relations between Spain and Korea is occurring unevenly, as trade imbalance steadily increases in favor of Korea. Spain's trade deficit with Korea amounted to 460 million ECU in 1997, while in 2005 it stood at 2,569 million euros. Part of this evolution is due to the increase in Korean exports since 1998, as a way of recovering from the 1997 crisis, since that year the Korean economy has depended on foreign markets for growth.

In 2021, South Korea's exports to Spain stood at 3.08 billion US Dollars: automobiles accounted for the largest portion (29.5%). Spain's exports to South Korea stood at 2.31 billion US Dollars: pig meats for the largest portion (19.1%).

== Resident diplomatic missions ==
- South Korea has an embassy in Madrid, a consulate-general in Barcelona and the consulate in the Canary Islands in Las Palmas.
- Spain has an embassy in Seoul.

== See also ==
- Foreign relations of South Korea
- Foreign relations of Spain
