= Koreans in Thailand =

- (South Korea) (Thailand)
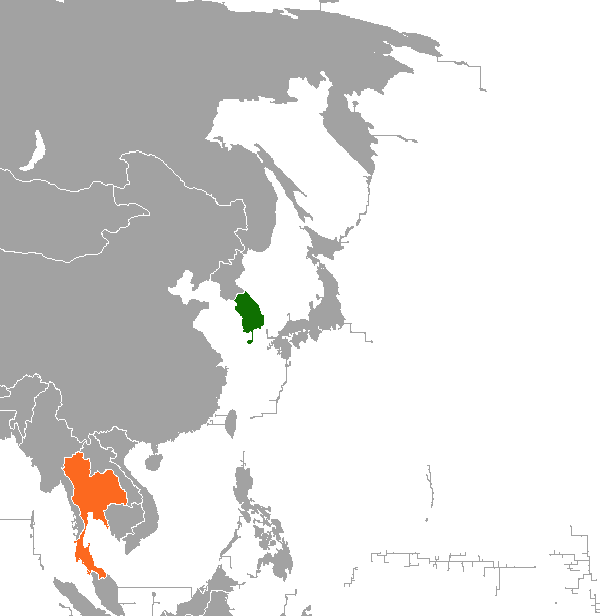

Total population
- 20,500 (2016)

Regions with significant populations
- Bangkok · Phuket · Chonburi · Chiang Mai Chiang Rai

Languages
- Korean · Thai

Religion
- Mahayana Buddhism and Christianity

Related ethnic groups
- Korean diaspora

Koreans in Thailand consist mainly of North Korean refugees and South Korean expatriates, along with a tiny number of South Korean immigrants who have naturalised as citizens of Thailand and their descendants. According to South Korea's Ministry of Foreign Affairs and Trade, in 2013 there were about 20,000 Koreans living in the country.

== Overview ==
=== North Korean refugees ===
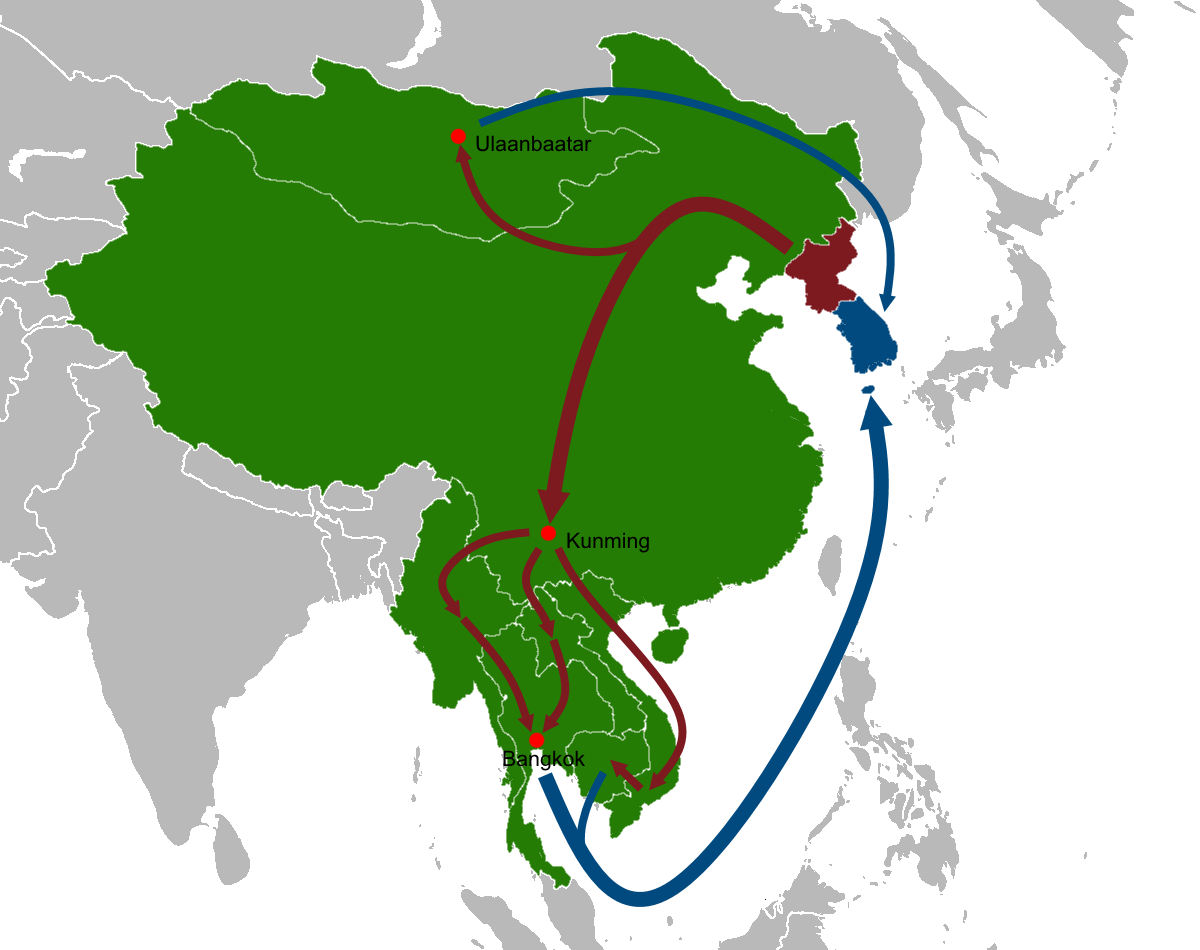
North Korean defectors often pass through Thailand on their way to South Korea.

Thailand's Chiang Rai province is a popular entry point for North Korean defectors into the country. Most of these defectors have escaped economic hardship in North Korea and traveled to Thailand for temporary refuge in the hope of being able to resettle in third countries, usually South Korea. Thailand is the easiest route to access and the most accommodating, compared to Mongolia and Vietnam, where border security is tighter and in some cases, those fleeing have been sent back to North Korea to face harsh punishment.

=== South Korean expatriates ===
A variety of factors have drawn South Korean expatriates to Thailand including the country's golf courses, as well as the cuisine, the weather, and business opportunities. There were an estimated 20,000 South Korean nationals or former nationals in Thailand as of 2011. Among them, 53 had obtained Thai nationality, 114 were permanent residents, 2,735 were international students, and the remaining 16,000-odd South Korean residents had other kinds of visas. Their population fell by about 13 percent from 20,200 since 2009. 14,900 live in Bangkok, 2,000 in Chiang Mai, 1,800 in Phuket Province, and 1,300 in Chonburi Province. Their community exhibits a significantly lopsided sex ratio, with 11,843 men as compared to just 8,657 women, a ratio of about 1.4:1.

Bangkok has a Koreatown in the Sukhumvit Plaza area near Sukhumvit Soi 12. Phuket also has a Koreatown and numerous Korean restaurants. There has been controversy over South Koreans working as tour guides without holding proper employment visas. The Tourism Authority of Thailand, the Korean Association in Phuket, and the South Korean consulate in Phuket signed an agreement in 2007 to promote the hiring of Thai tour guides instead. Korean culture is popular throughout the country thanks to the Korean Wave.

== Education and language ==
There is also a South Korean school in Bangkok, the Korean International School of Bangkok.

South Korean children born in Thailand to South Korean expatriates show little language shift towards Thai.

== Religion ==
There were two Korean Buddhist temples and thirteen Korean Christian churches in Bangkok as of 2008. The Korean Union Church at Ratchadaphisek Road is the most popular. The average Korean church in Bangkok has an attendance of about one to two hundred worshippers.

== In popular culture ==
Thai martial arts film The Kick follows a family of South Korean Taekwondo experts who move to Thailand.

== Notable people ==
- Aree Song, South Korean professional golfer
- Naree Song, South Korean professional golfer
- Park Jongbae, South Korean singer. He is a member of Thai boyband, K-Otic (Originally from Seoul, South Korea)
- Seo Ji-yeon, South Korean actress. (Originally from Daejeon, South Korea)
- Spill Tab (Claire Chicha), French-Korean singer-songwriter
- Kim Jinwook, South Korean singer. He is a member of Thai boyband, BUS

== See also ==
- South Korea–Thailand relations
- North Korean defectors in Thailand
