= Koreans in Micronesia =

Total population
- 7,512 (2013)

Regions with significant populations
- Guam: 5,016
- Northern Marianas: 2,281
- Palau: 122
- F. S. of Micronesia: 47
- Marshall Islands: 45
- Kiribati: 1

Languages
- Korean, Japanese

Related ethnic groups
- Korean diaspora

Koreans in Micronesia used to form a significant population before World War II, when most of the region was ruled as the South Seas Mandate of the Empire of Japan; for example, they formed 7.3% of the population of Palau in 1943. However, after the area came under the control of the United States as the Trust Territory of the Pacific Islands, most Koreans returned to their homeland. As of 2013, about seven thousand South Korean expatriates & immigrants and Korean Americans reside in the Marianas (Guam and the Commonwealth of the Northern Mariana Islands), which have remained under U.S. control, while only around two hundred South Korean expatriates reside in the independent countries of Micronesia.

== Japanese colonial era (1914–1945) ==
As the demand for labour increased sharply with the onset of war, Japanese authorities turned to the Korean peninsula as a source of cheap workers. The first Korean labourers came in January 1939, a group of 500; they were employed by Hōnan Sangyō K.K. (豊南産業株式会社) in cassava processing. From then until February 1940, 13 further shipments totalling 1,266 Korean workers arrived in Palau.

A 1943 census showed Palau's total Korean population at 2,458, or 7.3% of the population at the time; they were only one-tenth the size of the Japanese population. 864 lived on Babeldaob, another 721 were housed at the naval base on Malakal Island, 539 lived at Angaur, and the remaining 334 were scattered throughout other locations.

There were about 2,400 Koreans on Tinian at the time of the eponymous July 1944 battle which brought the island under U.S. control; they greeted their liberation from Japanese colonialism enthusiastically, and donated US$666.35 saved from their 35 cents/day wages to further the war effort.

Along with the Japanese, the Koreans were all repatriated after the surrender of Japan ended World War II. The process of repatriation began in September 1945, and lasted until May 1946. The total number who repatriated to Korea from Palau was recorded at greater than 3,000 people. In total, across all of the islands, U.S. records show 10,966 Korean repatriates (6,880 civilians, 3,751 military servicemen, and 190 soldiers), while Japanese records show just 7,727.

== Recent years (1945–present) ==
=== U.S. territories ===
According to the statistics of South Korea's Ministry of Foreign Affairs, there are 5,016 Koreans residing in Guam (1,933 Korean Americans, 1,426 with immigrant status, 133 international students, and 1,524 South Korean expatriates with other types of visas) and 2,281 in the Northern Mariana Islands (159 Korean Americans, 102 with immigrant status, 214 international students, and 1,806 with other types of visas).

Modern South Korean immigration to Guam began in 1971.

In Marpi, Saipan in the Northern Mariana Islands, a memorial to Korean soldiers in the Imperial Japanese Army who died during the Battle of Saipan was constructed in 1978. The local Korean community have held memorial services there annually since then. Akihito, Emperor of Japan visited the monument to pay his respects in June 2005

=== Elsewhere ===
Only about 120–130 South Korean expatriates live in Palau, including roughly 80 working on a construction project at Babeldaob. South Korea also ranked as the second-largest source country for tourists to Palau, behind the Republic of China on Taiwan; 5,507 South Korean tourists arrived in Palau in June 2006, an increase of 2% compared to June 2005.

== See also ==
- Japanese settlement in Micronesia
