= Koreans in Spain =

Ethnic group

Total population
- 4,080 (2011)

Languages
- Korean, Spanish

Religion
- Buddhism, Protestantism, Roman Catholicism

Related ethnic groups
- Korean diaspora

Koreans in Spain form one of the country's smaller Asian populations.

== Demography and distribution ==
2006 statistics from Spain's Instituto Nacional de Estadística showed 2,873 registered residents of Spain born in South Korea, of whom 514 held Spanish nationality, while 2,359 held other nationalities. Among Spanish nationals, men outnumbered women by a ratio of 1.3:1, which was almost exactly reversed among non-Spanish nationals. Between 1980 and 2004, a total of 696 people originally holding South Korean nationality became Spanish citizens. South Korea's Ministry of Foreign Affairs and Trade, whose statistics are based largely on registrations with consulates and count locally born persons of Korean descent as well as South Korean-born individuals, recorded a somewhat higher count of 3,769 individuals in 2005; of those, 2,538 resided in, with another 1,231 in Las Palmas. This made Koreans in Spain the fifth-largest Korean diaspora population in Western Europe, behind British Koreans, Koreans in Germany, Koreans in France, and Koreans in Italy.

The most recent statistics of the South Korean government, issued in July 2011, show only slight growth compared to the 2005 statistics. Of the 4,080 Koreans recorded as living in Spain, 929 had Spanish citizenship, 2,108 had permanent residence, 216 were on student visas, and the remaining 727 had other kinds of visas.

== Las Palmas ==
Koreans in Las Palmas form a community distinct from that on the Spanish mainland. Theirs is the only concentration of Koreans in Spain whose presence has resulted in a recognisable Koreatown. They trace their origins to South Korean migrant workers who worked on deep-ocean fishing boats based on the island starting in the 1960s. Fishing, along with construction, was one of the main sources of overseas employment for South Koreans for decades; by the 1970s, nearly 15,000 Koreans resided in Las Palmas, making them about 4% of the city's population of 350,000. Many brought their families over and became rooted in Spain, sending their children to local schools. However, with the decline of South Korea's ocean fisheries industries in the 1990s, their population shrank, from 2,283 individuals in 1997 to just 1,292 by 1999, a number which decreased at a slower rate over the following decade to reach 1,197 by 2011. Most of the remaining Korean population have shifted away from the fishing industry, and their children have largely entered professional fields, achieving relative affluence.

== Mainland Spain ==
The Korean community on the Spanish mainland consists mainly of two groups: primarily male small business owners and executives of South Korean companies along with their spouses and children, and primarily female international students at Spanish universities. Korean martial artists, though a smaller group, are also well represented; they either run their own dojang, or work for private security companies. They do not trace their origins exclusively to South Korea; some members of the communities of Koreans in Argentina and other Latin American countries have also settled in Spain, and South Korean businessowners often employ joseonjok from China in their businesses. Their population peaked in the 1990s and then decreased due to the 1997 Asian financial crisis, during which many South Korean companies, anxious to cut costs, shifted operations out of Western Europe into the cheaper countries of Eastern Europe, Latin America, and China.

== Notable people ==
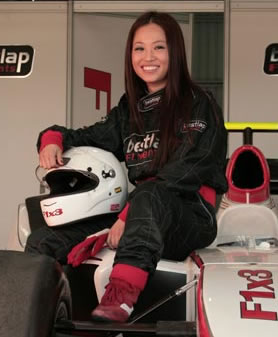
Usun Yoon

- Usun Yoon, actress and reporter.
- Ahn Eak-tai, composer of Aegukga, died in Mallorca
- Kimera (singer), singer who worked mostly in Spain and France
- Marvin Park

== See also ==
- South Korea–Spain relations
- Immigration to Spain
- Korean diaspora
