= Koreans in Paraguay =

Ethnic group

재파라과이 한인 Jae Paraguai Hanin Coreanos en Paraguay

Total population
- 45,205 (2025)

Regions with significant populations
- Asunción: 4,540
- Ciudad del Este: 528
- Encarnación: 89
- Pedro Juan Caballero and others: 48

Languages
- Spanish, Korean, English

Religion
- Christianity

Related ethnic groups
- Korean diaspora

Koreans in Paraguay formed one of the earliest Korean diaspora communities in Latin America. However, they were always overshadowed by the larger Korean communities in neighbouring Brazil and Argentina and since the late 1990s, their population has fallen significantly.

== Migration history ==
The first Korean immigrants to Paraguay came from Busan on a two-month journey by sea to Buenos Aires and then overland to Asunción, finally arriving on 22 April 1965. Exact numbers of migrants are difficult to calculate because Paraguay offered on-the-spot visas to all foreigners and did not distinguish between those who came to settle in the country as opposed to those who intended to remain only temporarily; 120,000 Koreans arrived in Paraguay between 1975 and 1990, according to official figures, but many migrated onwards to Brazil, both legally and illegally. Paraguay's 1982 census showed 2,700 Koreans in Paraguay, but this was believed to have undercounted the actual population by as much as an order of magnitude. By 1999, South Korea's Ministry of Foreign Affairs and Trade estimated that 10,428 Koreans resided in the country, but by just two years later, that figure fell by more than 40% to 6,190.

The population continued to decline after that, though less sharply; as of 2009, Koreans in Paraguay had fallen to the fifth-largest group of Koreans in Latin America, and 24th largest in the world. Between 2009 and 2011, the population remained roughly stable. Of the 5,205 South Korean nationals or former nationals in Paraguay in 2011, 499 had become Paraguayan nationals, the vast majority (4,641 persons) had permanent residency, 16 were international students and 49 had other kinds of visas.

== Business and employment ==
The early Korean migrants who settled in Paraguay engaged in a variety of agricultural and commercial work, including beekeeping and door-to-door sales of imported clothing. By the early 1980s, many were involved in importing consumer electronics as well. Some also opened convenience stores in poorer neighbourhoods; they gained attention for remaining open through the siesta, unlike many of their competitors. The second generation has largely moved away from manual labour or small retail business and entered into the liberal professions, such as medicine, law, pharmacy, architecture and accountancy.

== Language and education ==
Koreans in Paraguay opened their own school in 1972, the Colegio Coreano del Paraguay (파라과이한국학교), to provide cultural and language education to their youth. It is located in the San Vicente neighbourhood of Asunción. A Korean American Presbyterian church opened another school, the Colegio Presbiteriano Cerritos, in Villa Elisa (in the Asunción metropolitan area) in 1992.

Little language shift is observed from Korean-dominance to Spanish-dominance among members of the Korean community in Paraguay, including those born locally; this contrasts sharply with the rapid shift from Korean-dominance to English-dominance among Korean Americans, especially of the second generation. Many Koreans in Paraguay send their children to study in universities in the United States and Europe; as of 2007, there were also roughly 100 Paraguay-born Koreans studying at universities in South Korea. They typically view English, rather than Spanish, as the most prestigious and economically important language to learn.

== Religion ==
Korean Christian missionaries are active among indigenous communities in Alto Paraná department. Korean churches in Ciudad del Este include Jardín del Dios and Iglesia de la Asamblea de Dios.

== Notable people ==
- Daniel Chung, sports journalist
- Daiana Cubilla Lee, Miss Paraguay 2009 runner-up
- Alice Park, Miss Paraguay pageant participant and model
- Yolanda Park, journalist and TV host for TV Canal 9

== See also ==
- Paraguay–South Korea relations
- Namuwiki, Paraguay-based Korean wiki website
