= Lemon pepper wings =

Chicken wings dish from Atlanta, Georgia, US

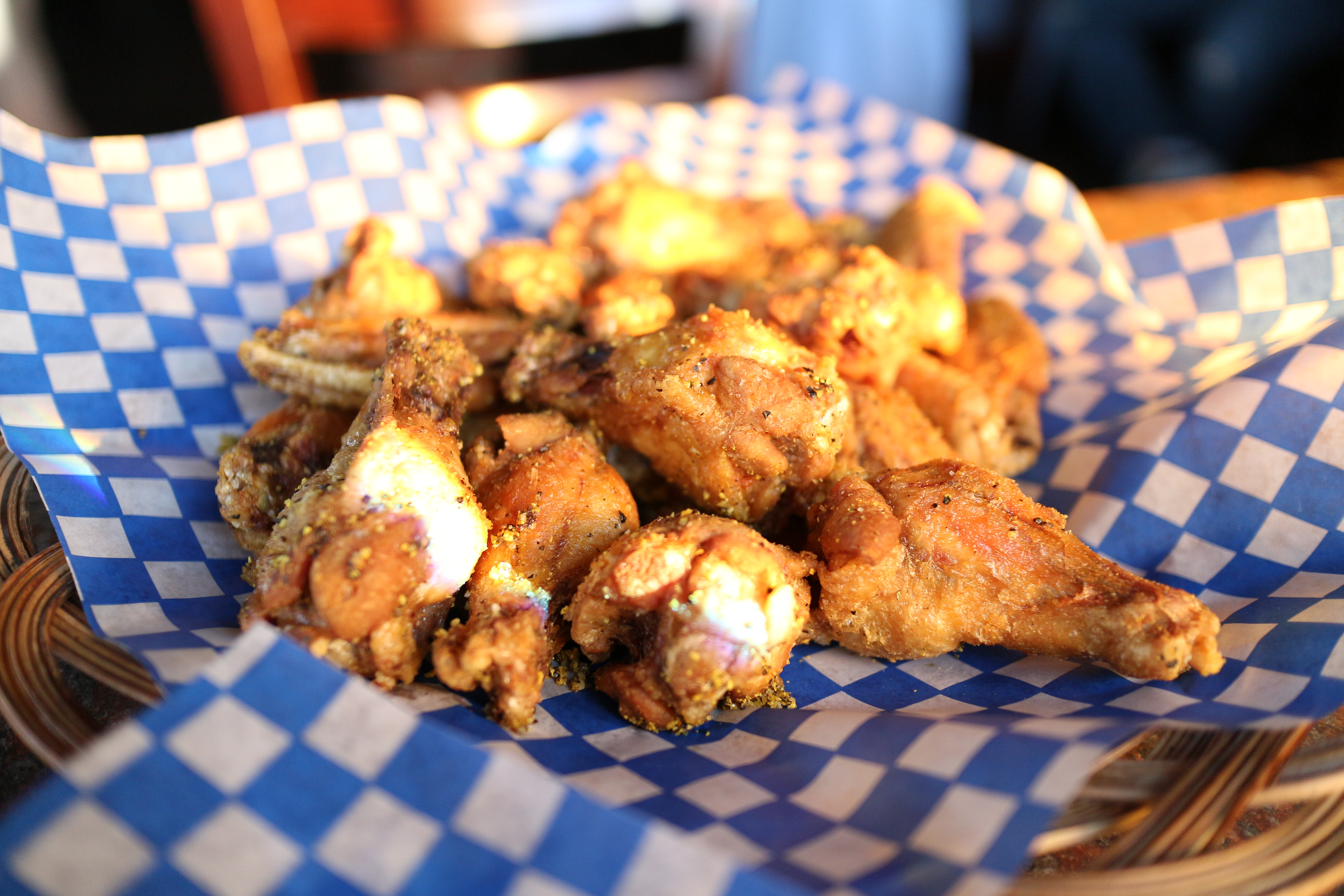
- A basket of lemon pepper wings
- Course: Appetizer or main course
- Place of origin: Atlanta, Georgia
- Associated cuisine: Cuisine of the Southern United States
- Main ingredients: Chicken, lemon pepper

Lemon pepper wings are unbreaded chicken wings coated in lemon pepper seasoning. The dish was invented in Atlanta, Georgia, and is considered to be emblematic of the cuisine of Atlanta.

== History ==
Lemon pepper wings were invented in Atlanta, Georgia, where people began adding lemon pepper to buffalo wings to reduce their spiciness. The popularity of lemon pepper wings in the mid-2000s has been attributed to their being less likely to dirty clothes than buffalo wings, making them preferred by rappers who commonly wore white t-shirts at the time.

Lemon pepper wings are frequently served in Atlanta's strip clubs. Chris Kirschner of The Athletic observed that high-quality food was often a hallmark of Atlanta strip clubs, particularly wings, and their food was known to draw celebrity guests.

The dish is strongly associated with Atlanta cuisine. Future Atlanta mayor Keisha Lance Bottoms commented that "Lemon pepper wings are Atlanta" in 2017. In 2022, Eric Kim of The New York Times wrote that "in Atlanta, lemon pepper is queen" and described the wings as "central to [the city's] social fabric."

The dish is served throughout the United States by chain restaurants. The wings have also inspired various items such as lemon pepper tacos, loaded fries, pierogies, pizza, beer, and soda.

== Description ==
The dish is prepared by roasting unbreaded chicken wings. After cooking, they are tossed in lemon pepper, a seasoning made with lemon zest and black pepper as well as other ingredients such as sugar. Many recipes use premade lemon pepper.

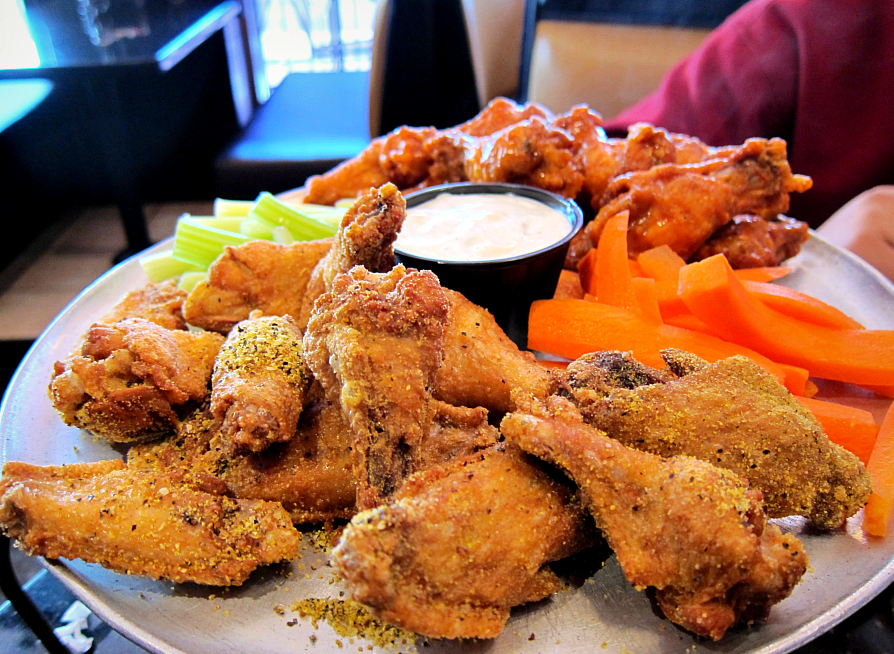
A platter of lemon pepper wings, buffalo wings, and sliced vegetables

=== Lemon pepper wet ===
"Lemon pepper wet" is a variation in which the wings are coated in a sauce. They may be tossed in a lemon sauce instead of a dry rub. This version of the dish was invented at the American Deli in Atlanta. Other versions of this dish involve coating the wings with butter or buffalo sauce and tossing them in dry lemon pepper seasoning.

== In popular culture ==
Lemon pepper wings are commonly referenced in music and television related to Atlanta. The 2 Chainz song "Hot Wings" (2018) includes the verse "She just want her 20-piece/ All flats with the lemon pepper". They are mentioned in the Drake song "Lemon Pepper Freestyle" (2021) featuring Rick Ross. Ross, who owns several Wingstop locations, has mentioned them in numerous other songs including "Buy Back the Block", "Dope Dick", "U.O.E.N.O." and "Thug Cry". They have also been mentioned in songs by rappers like Gucci Mane and the group Migos.

They appeared in the second episode of the television series Atlanta, in which a character receives "lemon pepper wet" wings from the real life restaurant J.R. Crickets. The scene went viral on social media and popularized the dish online. At the time, "lemon pepper wet" wings were not on the restaurant's menu although they had a similar dish called "Fester" wings which customers frequently referred to as "lemon pepper wet". The "lemon pepper wet" depicted in the show was actually inspired by a dish served at the American Deli, a different restaurant in Atlanta. Writer Stephen Glover explained that he wanted the character to be "hooked up" by receiving an item that was not on the menu at J.R. Crickets. In 2017, J.R. Crickets added "lemon pepper wet" to the menu in honor of the show. Mike Jordan of Eater Atlanta claimed that the episode had popularized the dish.

In 2020, Lou Williams of the Los Angeles Clippers was nicknamed "Lemon Pepper Lou" on social media when it was reported that he ordered lemon pepper wings with Jack Harlow at the Magic City strip club during a trip outside the NBA Bubble. Williams was previously known for frequenting the club to purchase its wings, where the dish "Louwill Lemon Pepper BBQ Wings" was named after him. He objected to the nickname but later trademarked it.

== See also ==
- Hot chicken
