= Eric Kim =

Eric Kim may refer to:

- Eric Kim (comics), Canadian creator of comic books
- Eric Kim (food writer), Korean-American food writer
- Eric B. Kim, Korean-American businessman in the technology field
