= Cuisine of Atlanta =

Culinary traditions of Atlanta, Georgia, United States

The cuisine of Atlanta reflects both Southern and much broader influences. The city is home to a mix of high-end chef-driven restaurants receiving praise at the national level, an ethnic restaurant scene along Buford Highway, and traditional Southern eateries.

Atlanta is the birthplace of Coca-Cola. The fast food chain Chick-fil-A originated in Hapeville, a suburb of Atlanta.

== Historic restaurants ==
The city's first restaurant was a tiny establishment manned by a Frenchman named Toney Maquino, who served ham, eggs, and oysters when the city was still known as Marthasville. After the Civil War, R.G. Thompson opened the city's first fine dining restaurant, named Thompson's, which served high-end fare, including steaks and oysters. Henry Durand became the most prominent restaurateur in the Reconstruction time period.

== High-end chef-driven restaurants ==
Since the turn of the 21st century, Atlanta has emerged as a sophisticated restaurant town. Many restaurants opened in the city's gentrifying neighborhoods have received praise at the national level, including Bocado, Bacchanalia, Flip Burger Boutique, and Miller Union in West Midtown, Empire State South in Midtown; and Two Urban Licks, Parish, and Rathbun's on the east side. The New York Times in 2011 characterized Empire State South and Miller Union as reflecting "a new kind of sophisticated Southern sensibility centered on the farm but experienced in the city".

=== Celebrity chefs ===
Atlanta is home to a number of celebrity chefs who have appeared on food reality television series such as Top Chef.

| Chef | Atlanta-area restaurant(s) (past and present) | Food reality series |
|---|---|---|
| Anne Quatrano | Bacchanalia, Quinones, Star Provisions, Floataway Cafe (all together with Cliff Harrison) | Chefs A' Field |
| Hugh Acheson | Empire State South; 5&10 (Athens, Georgia) | Top Chef |
| Jeffrey Gardner | South City Kitchen Midtown | Chopped |
| Justin Burdett | Miller Union | Chopped |
| Kevin Gillespie | Woodfire Grill, Gunshow, Cold Beer | Top Chef |
| Kevin Rathbun | Rathbun's, Kevin Rathbun Steak, KR Steakbar, NAVA, Bluepointe, Buckhead Life Group | Chopped & Iron Chef America |
| Sean Telo | Noon Midtown (closed) | Chopped |

Other renowned chefs without food reality TV appearances include:

- Peter Chang (Tasty China (Marietta), Peter Chang's)
- Shane Devereux (The Lawrence (opened 2012), dinner party, Sound Table, TopFlr
- Paul Luna (Lunatic Black Market, Loca Luna, Eclipse di Luna)
- Art Smith (Southern Art)

== Ethnic restaurants ==
Buford Highway, stretching from near Buckhead to Gwinnett County, is the area's international food destination. There, the million-plus immigrants who make Atlanta home have established various authentic ethnic restaurants, ranging from Vietnamese, Indian, Cuban, Korean, Salvadoran, Mexican, Colombian, Dominican, Japanese and Chinese, to Ethiopian.

== Traditional landmarks ==
Local landmarks include The Varsity, opened in 1928 as the world's largest drive-in restaurant, and Mary Mac's Tea Room, opened in 1945, a traditional destination for Southern food. Paschal's and the Busy Bee Cafe have been soul food favorites since the 1940s; the Busy Bee and Paschal's became meeting places for civil rights leaders such as Martin Luther King Jr. and Hosea Williams. The Busy Bee according to Unique Eats and Eateries of Atlanta, is "as well known for its role in the civil rights movement as it is for its fried chicken."

== Restaurant districts ==
Restaurant districts include Buckhead, Virginia-Highland, and the Luckie-Marietta District downtown.

Current avant-garde culinary districts are the Old Fourth Ward, particularly Edgewood Avenue, and West Midtown, home to Atlanta's two top Zagat-rated restaurants, Bacchanalia and the Quinones Room.
