= Koreans in the New York metropolitan area =

Korean community in New York City area

Koreans in New York City
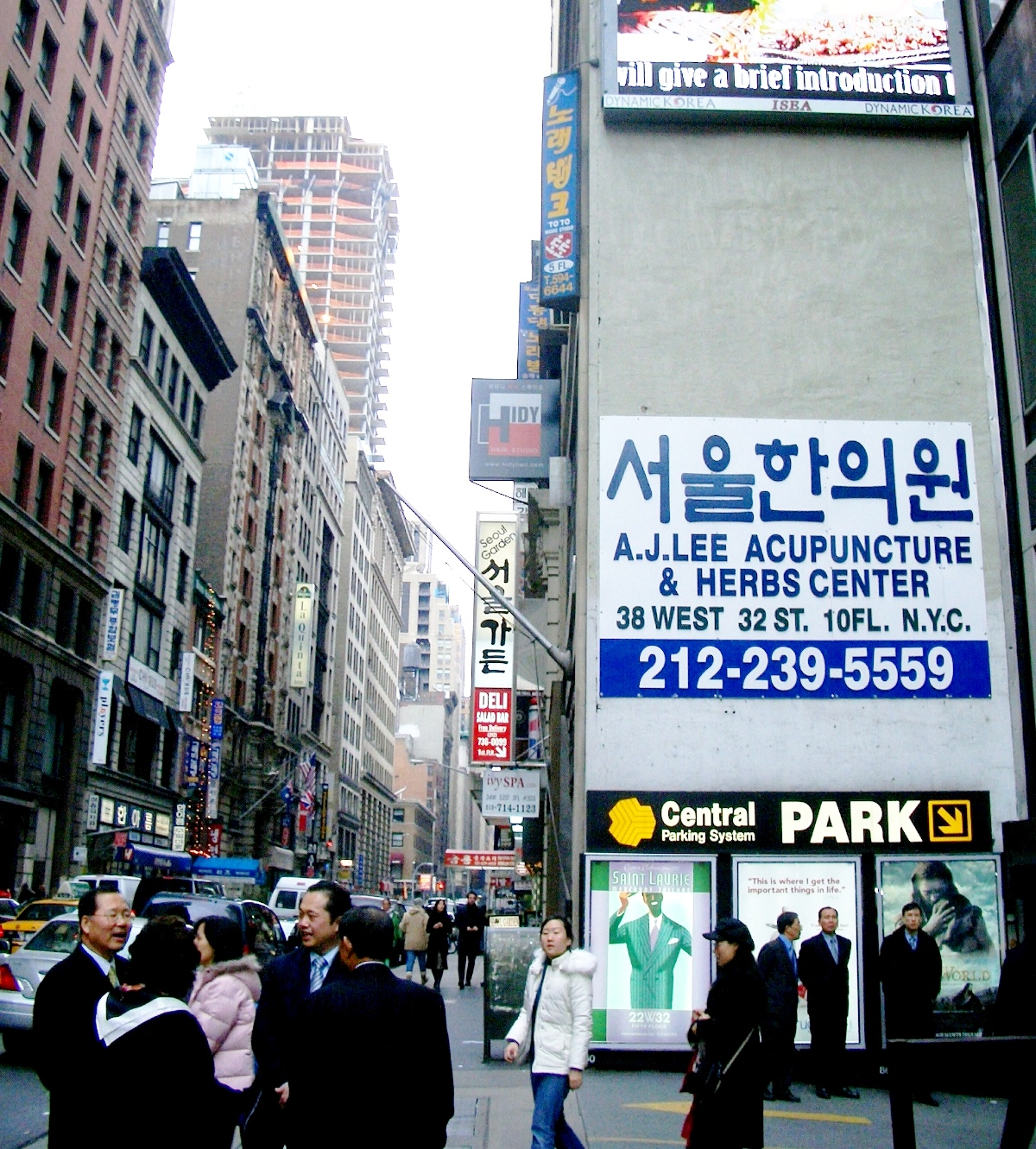
- Congregating in Manhattan's Koreatown. 40.747°N 73.987°W

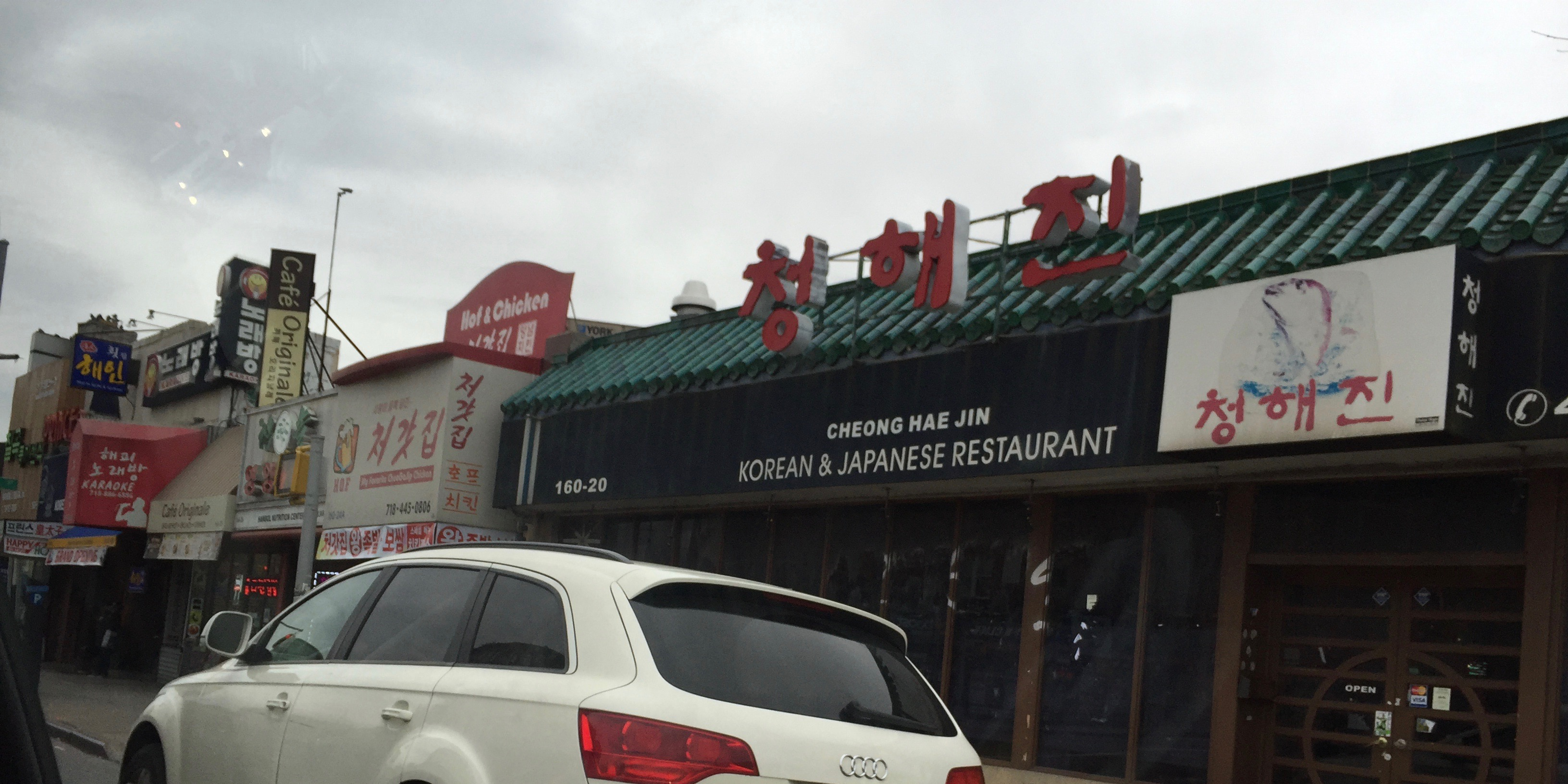
The Long Island Koreatown originated in Flushing, Queens before sprawling eastward along Northern Boulevard and eventually into Nassau County. 40°44′32″N 73°52′43″W

As of the 2011 American Community Survey, New York City is home to 100,000 ethnic Koreans, with two-thirds living in the borough of Queens. The overall Greater New York combined statistical area numbered 218,764 Korean American residents as of the 2010 United States census, the second-largest population of Koreans outside of Korea and the most prominent.

== History ==
Mass Korean immigration to the United States began in the 1950s, with a large wave occurring over the 1960s and 1970s. Koreans historically came to the New York metropolitan area with the intention of permanently settling in the city and establishing businesses. Originally, ethnic Koreans settled in highly urbanized neighborhoods in Manhattan and Queens, but beginning in the 1980s, wealthier Koreans began moving to suburban communities in nearby Bergen County, New Jersey across the George Washington Bridge, alongside the Hudson River—as well as to adjacent Nassau County (on Long Island) and Westchester County, both locally within New York State itself. Many ethnic Koreans moved into areas already settled by the metropolitan Japanese community. By 1988, there were about 150,000 ethnic Koreans living in the New York City area. In the 1980s, a continuous stream of Korean immigrants also emerged into the Long Island Koreatown, many of whom began as employees in the medical field or as Korean international students who had moved to New York City to find or initiate professional or entrepreneurial positions. They established a foothold on Union Street in the Flushing neighborhood of Queens, between 35th and 41st Avenues, featuring restaurants and karaoke (noraebang) bars, grocery markets, education centers and bookstores, banking institutions, offices, consumer electronics vendors, apparel boutiques, and other commercial enterprises. In 1990, Korean-American owned shops were boycotted in the Flatbush section of Brooklyn; the boycott started by Black Nationalist, Sonny Carson, lasted for six months and became known as the Flatbush boycott. In September 2023, Oh Se-hoon, the mayor of Seoul, met with New York City mayor Eric Adams in Manhattan to deepen the cultural and economic ties between Seoul and New York City.

== Geographic distribution ==
Manhattan's Koreatown is primarily a Korean business district in Midtown Manhattan, but since 2008, the district has seen an increase in Korean, Japanese, and European traffic as well, and the resident Korean population in the area has grown concomitantly. There was never a formal plan or agreement to create a Korean commercial district in Manhattan. However, given the high levels of tourist traffic stemming from its proximity to the Empire State Building, Macy's Herald Square, Penn Station, Madison Square Garden, the Garment District, and the Flower District, amongst other Midtown Manhattan landmarks, it was an ideal location for Korean immigrants to settle. Initiated by the opening of a Korean bookstore and a handful of restaurants in the 1980s, Koreatown sprang into being. With their success, an additional stream of Korean-owned businesses took root in the neighborhood, coinciding with increased immigration from Korea; and with rising demand for the prime location, overall property values in the area increased as well. According to the 2010 United States Census, the Korean population of Manhattan (co-extensive with New York County) had nearly doubled to approximately 20,000 over the decade since the 2000 Census. Although Korea Way continues to represent the heart of Koreatown, situated between Broadway, Sixth Avenue, and Fifth Avenue, Koreatown itself has been expanding further eastward from Fifth Avenue along East 32nd Street, toward Park Avenue in Midtown Manhattan, in the direction of Queens. Koreatown, Manhattan has become described as the "Korean Times Square" and has emerged as the international economic outpost for the Korean chaebol. More broadly, Koreatown is attracting new Korean residents to the adjacent Manhattan neighborhoods of Murray Hill, Kips Bay, and Rose Hill. The world's largest international Korean Pride Festival was inaugurated in Koreatown, Manhattan in October 2022 and has been growing on an annual basis.

As the community grew in wealth, population, and socioeconomic status, Koreans expanded their presence eastward along Northern Boulevard, buying homes in more affluent and less crowded Queens neighborhoods and more recently into adjacent suburban Nassau County, bringing their businesses with them, and thereby expanding the Koreatown itself. This expansion has led to the creation of an American Meokjagolmok, or Korean Restaurant Street, around the Long Island Rail Road station in Murray Hill, Queens, exuding the ambience of Seoul itself. The eastward pressure to expand was also created by the inability to move westward, inhibited by the formidable presence of the enormous Flushing Chinatown centered on Main Street. Per the 2010 United States Census, the Korean population of Queens was 64,107, while the Korean population of Nassau County had increased by nearly two-thirds to approximately 14,000 over one decade since the 2000 Census. Korean Air and Asiana Airlines provide non-stop flights from Seoul to JFK Airport in Queens, Air Premia and United Airlines provide non-stop flights from Seoul to EWR Airport in Newark, and the Consulate-General of South Korea in Manhattan has played an important role in mediating travel to and from Korea by the Korean diaspora living in the New York metropolitan area.

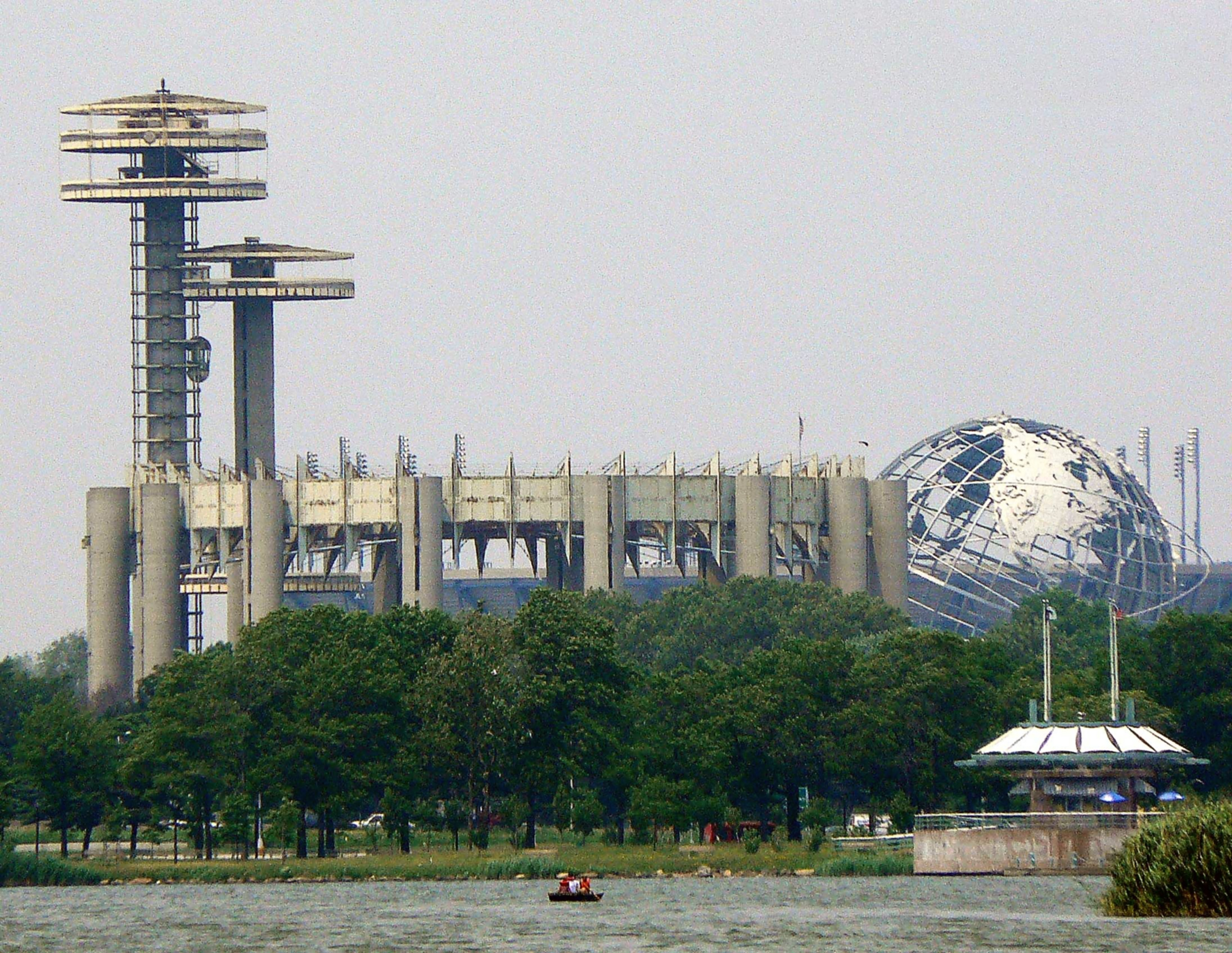
Korean American residents in Queens can enjoy an urban oasis at Flushing Meadows-Corona Park.

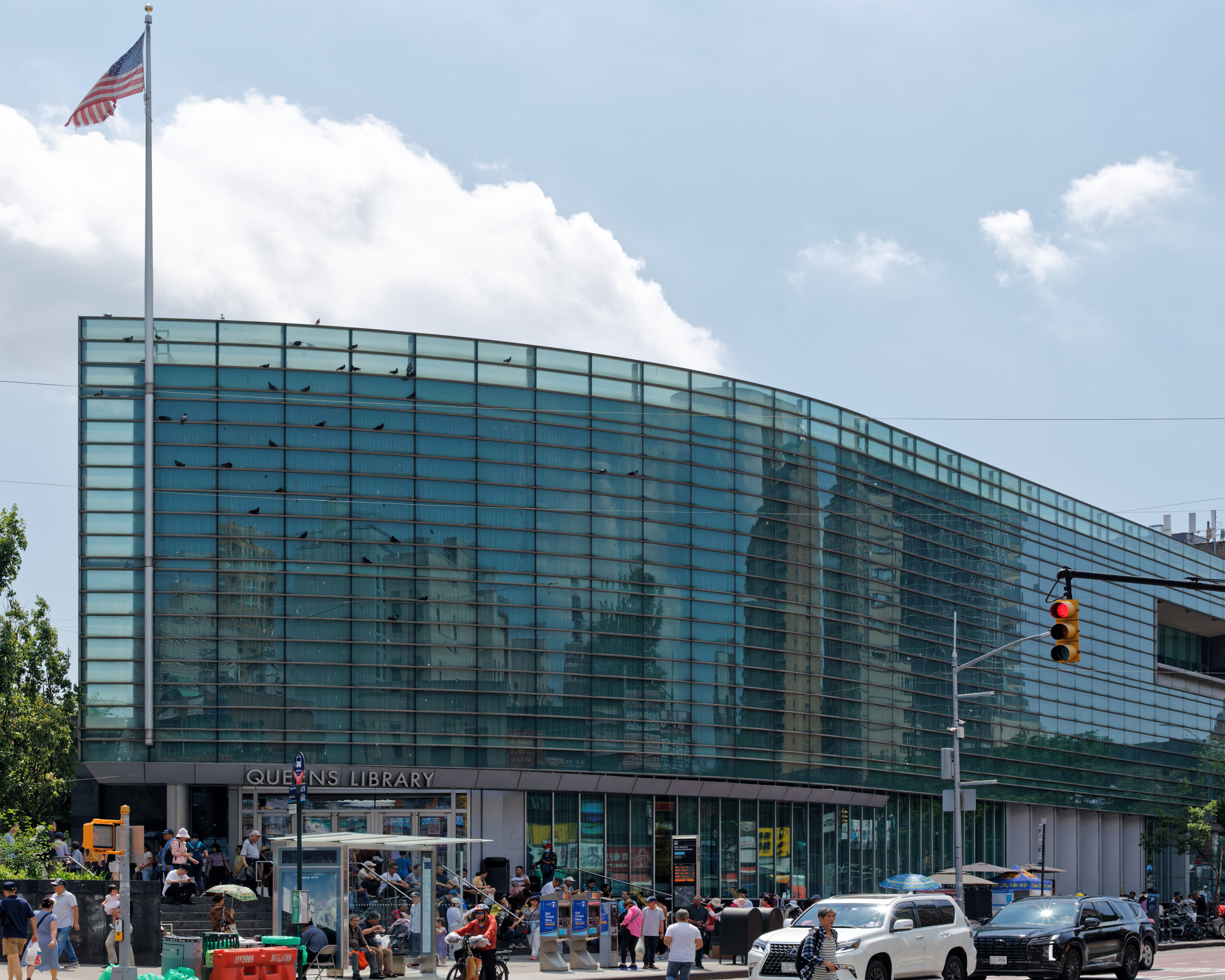
Korean American residents also prominently use the Queens Library in Flushing.

Other established and growing Koreatowns in the New York metropolitan area are located in nearby Bergen County, New Jersey, namely the Fort Lee Koreatown and the Palisades Park Koreatown. Signage in Hangul is ubiquitous in all of the Koreatowns. In addition to the Korean chaebol maintaining their international headquarters in New York City and Bergen County, New Jersey—H Mart, the largest Korean supermarket chain outside of Korea, is based in Fort Lee, New Jersey in Bergen County, and KPOT Korean BBQ, the largest Korean barbecue chain in North America, is headquartered in East Brunswick, New Jersey, in Middlesex County.

== Politics ==
In November 2012, Ronald Tae Sok Kim became the first male Korean American who is a resident of the county of Queens to be elected to The New York State Assembly representing the district encompassing Flushing, New York. He was the first Korean American elected to public office in the State of New York. Ron Kim ran for New York City Public Advocate in 2019. He lost the special election.

In November 2021, Linda Lee was elected to the New York City Council representing parts of eastern Queens.

In November 2021, Julie Won became the first female Korean American elected to represent the neighborhood of Long Island City and other parts of western Queens in The New York City Council.

In November 2022, Grace Lee became the first female Korean American who is a resident of the borough of Manhattan to be elected to The New York State Assembly representing the district encompassing Downtown Manhattan.

== Education ==
Korean language schools in the New York City region tend to have distinct educational missions and clienteles, and each school has its own distinct management. Because, as of 1988, ethnic Koreans settling in New York City generally intended to permanently immigrate to the United States, the only Korean-oriented schools that year were supplementary institutions holding classes on Saturdays and Sundays.

Korean churches typically hold Korean language classes for a half to one hour per week during Sundays. In addition to the churches, there are non-religious operators of Korean schools. In 1988, the Consulate-General of South Korea in New York stated that about 40% of the Korean schools in the New York City area were non-religious. The first Korean schools were established by ethnic Korean churches.

=== Individual Korean schools ===
The Korean School of New York was the first secular Korean school established in the city, opening in 1973. The founder, who remained as the school's principal academic administrator in 1988, believed that Korean language education should be separate from religion. As of 1988, this school had 205 students.

The Korean School of Queens originated as a church-operated school, and as of 1988, offered classes for elderly persons and children. In that year, the school had 141 enrolled students. As of 1988, the Korean School of New Jersey (뉴저지 한국학교) had 262 students, making it the largest Korean school in the New York City area, serving students living in suburbs in northern New Jersey. In 1988, the Church of Brooklyn Korean Language School had 120 students, the Broadway Korean School of New York had 97 students, the Westchester Korean School had 50 students, and the Pearl River Korean School had 36 students. In 2014, the McGoldrick Branch of the Queens Library in Flushing began holding Korean language classes.

== Korean culture ==
=== Korean cuisine ===
==== Development of Koreatown, Manhattan as a Korean dining destination ====
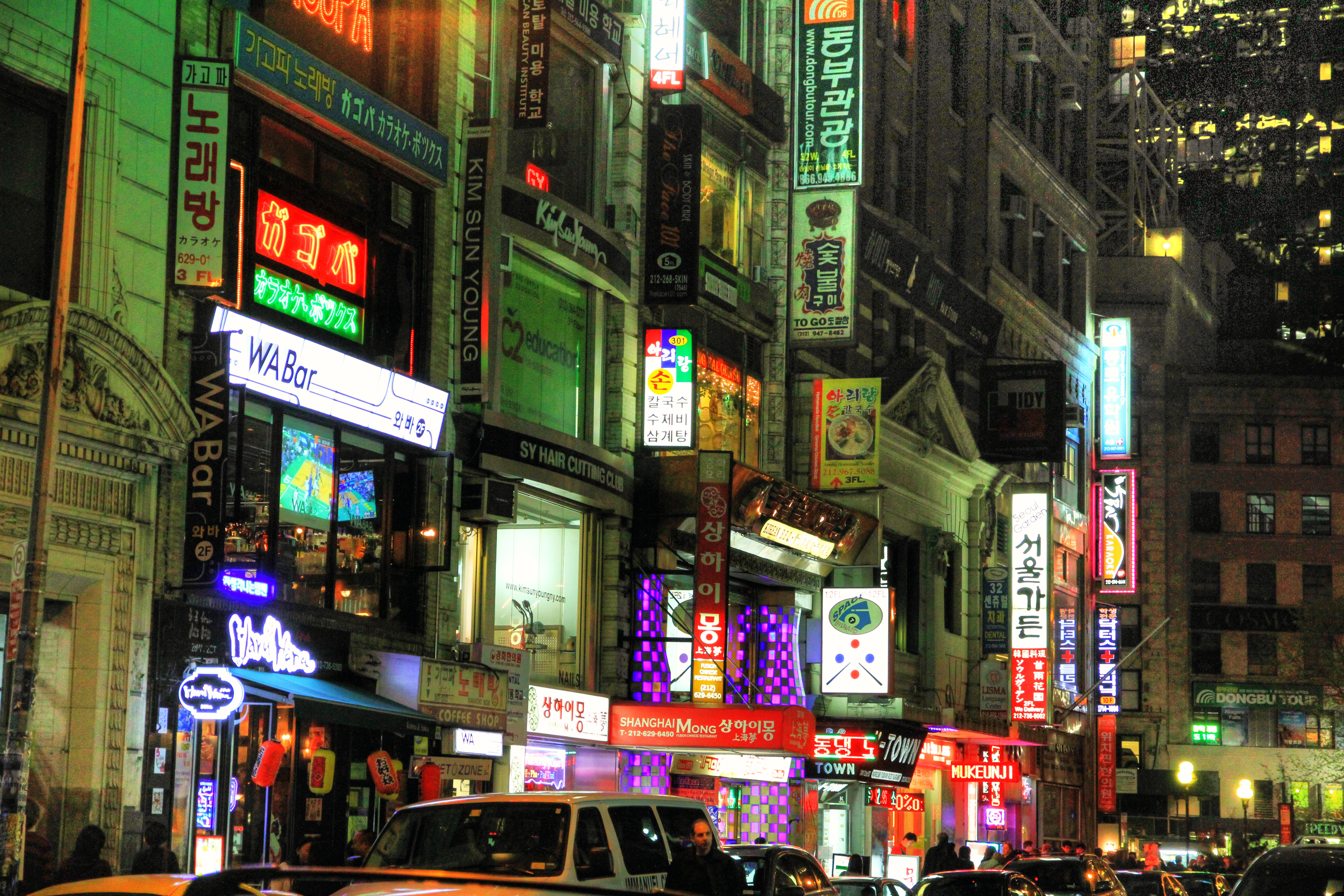
Approximately fifteen restaurants operate 24/7 on Korea Way in Koreatown, Manhattan.

Approximately fifteen restaurants conduct business 24/7 on Korea Way in Koreatown, Manhattan. Korean restaurants in the district have had to expand or stay open around the clock to meet rising commercial rents and stay financially viable, given the growing prestige and high customer volume generated by foot traffic in Koreatown, Manhattan, and greater investment and involvement by the Korean chaebol. Historically known as a more tourist-oriented alternative to the residential and somewhat suburban Flushing and Murray Hill, Queens in the nearby Long Island Koreatown, Koreatown in Manhattan has since developed a reputation as an authentic Korean dining destination.

==== Recognition by chefs and authenticity of Korean cuisine in Queens ====
According to The New York Times, a "Kimchi Belt" stretches along Northern Boulevard and the Long Island Rail Road tracks, from Flushing, Queens, eastward into Nassau County, in the Long Island Koreatown. A prominent Korean food chef stated that "Queens is the closest you can come to authentic Korean food." The Long Island Koreatown features numerous restaurants that serve both traditional and/or regional Korean cuisine. The development of this Koreatown has led to the creation of an American Meokjagolmok, or Korean Restaurant Street, around the Long Island Rail Road station in Murray Hill, Queens, exuding the ambience of Seoul itself. Korean Chinese cuisine is also available in the Long Island Koreatown.

==== Koreatowns in Bergen County, New Jersey ====
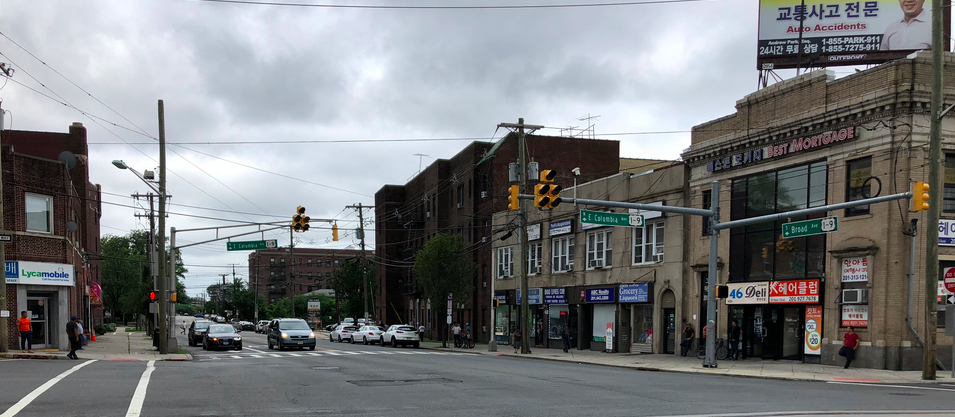
Koreatown, Palisades Park, at Broad and Columbia, in Bergen County, New Jersey, the U.S. county with the highest concentration of Korean people, at 6.3%

Broad Avenue in Koreatown, Palisades Park in Bergen County, New Jersey has been referred to as the "Korean food walk of fame", with diverse offerings. Palisades Park's Koreatown now incorporates the highest concentration of Korean restaurants within a one-mile radius in the United States, and Broad Avenue has evolved into a Korean dessert destination as well. Korean Chinese cuisine is now also available in Koreatown, as is misugaru. Bulgogi and galbi are staples on Broad Avenue in the Palisades Park Koreatown. Korean cafés have become a major cultural element within Palisades Park's Koreatown, not only for the coffee, bingsu (shaved ice), and pastries, but also as communal gathering places. Koreatown in Palisades Park, and its adjacently connected Koreatown in Fort Lee, New Jersey, have emerged as a dominant nexus of Korean American culture.

=== K-pop ===
The K-pop industry is active in New York City, hosting numerous concerts in the city as well as being home to K-pop musicians. The musical KPOP opened Off-Broadway in 2017 and moved to Broadway in 2022, with Luna in the starring role, and co-starring fellow K-pop stars Kevin Woo, Min, and Kim Bo-hyung.

== Notable people ==
Korean New Yorkers

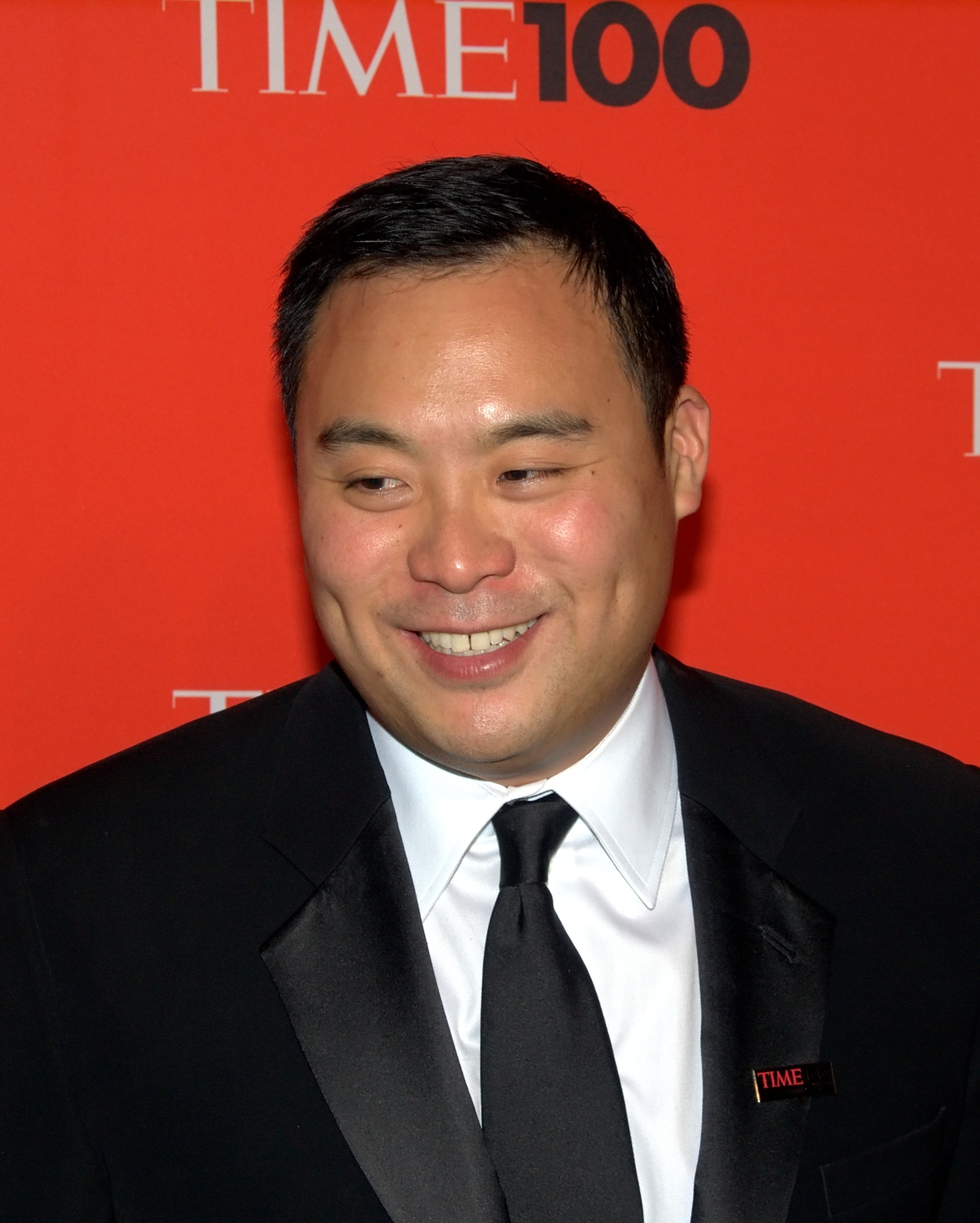
David Chang

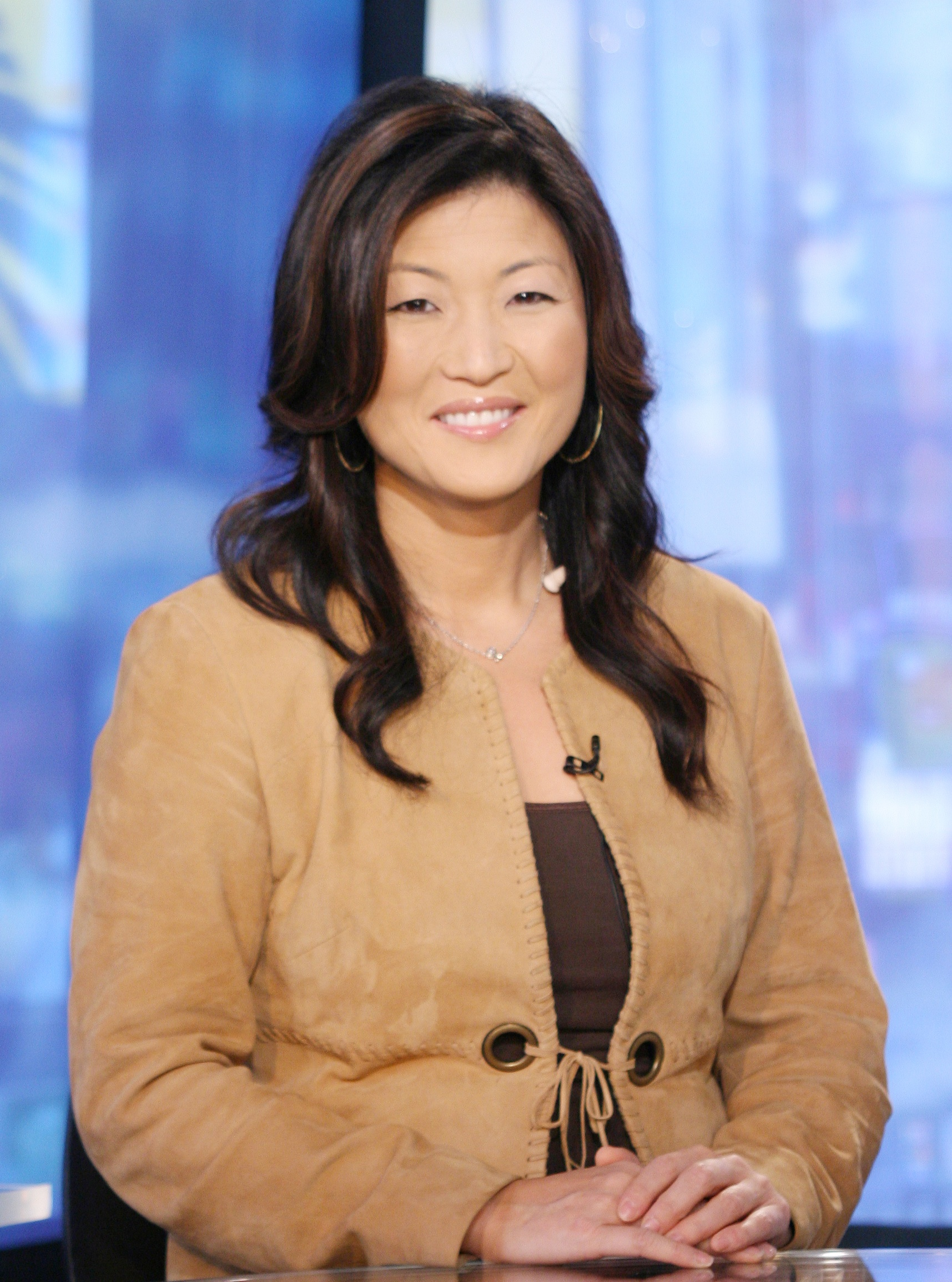
Juju Chang

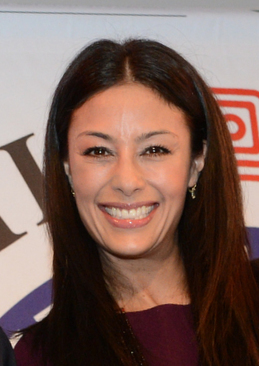
Liz Cho

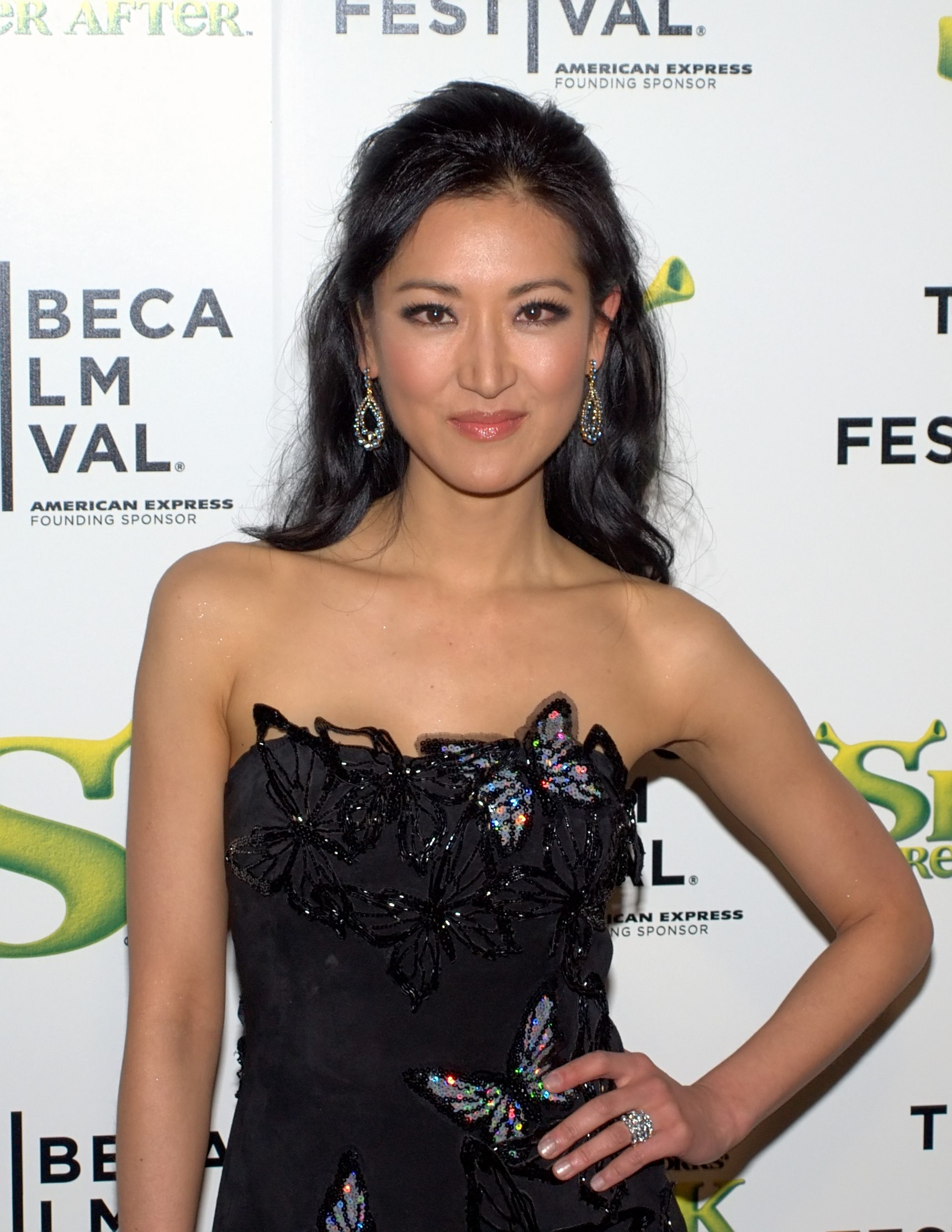
Kelly Choi

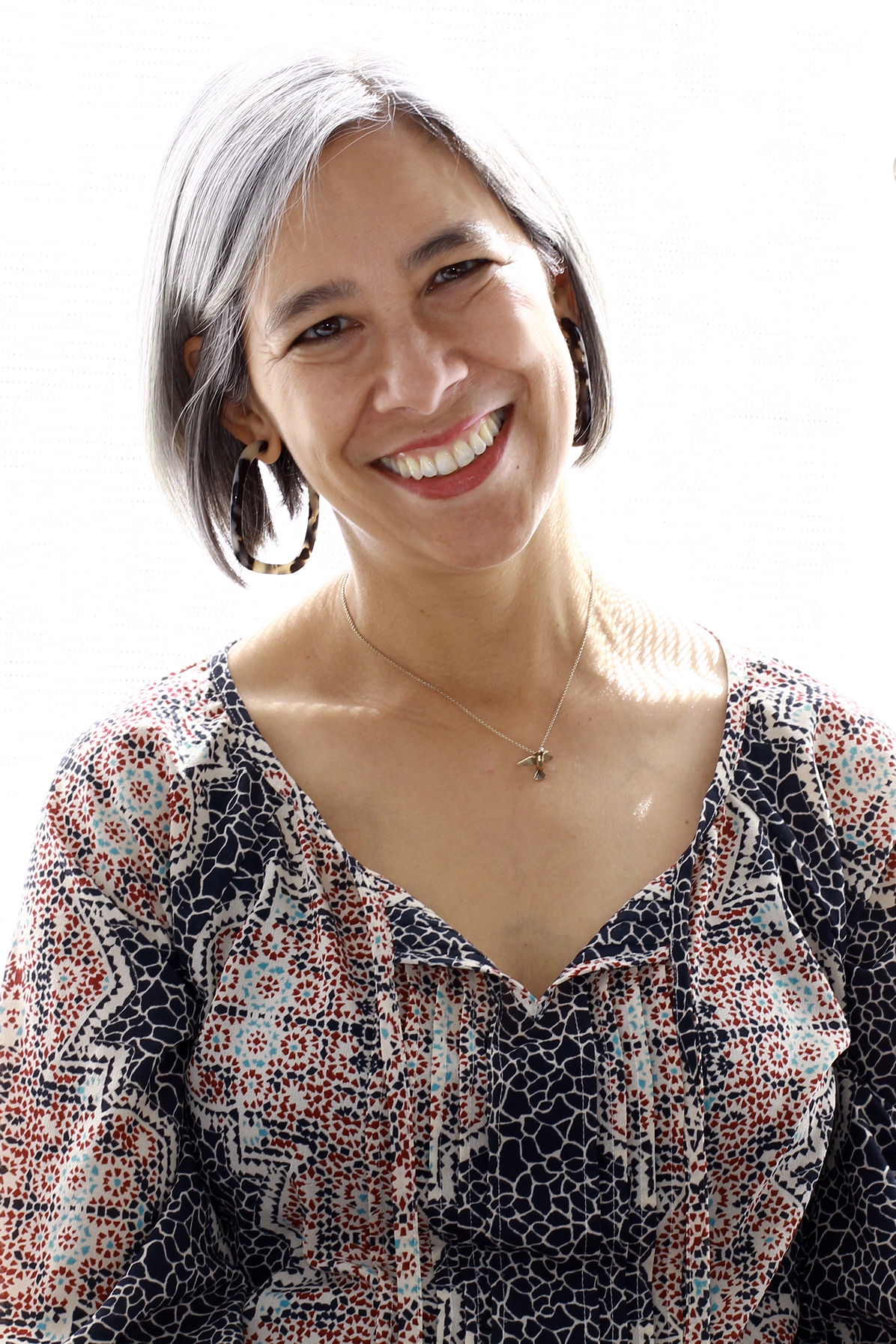
Susan Choi

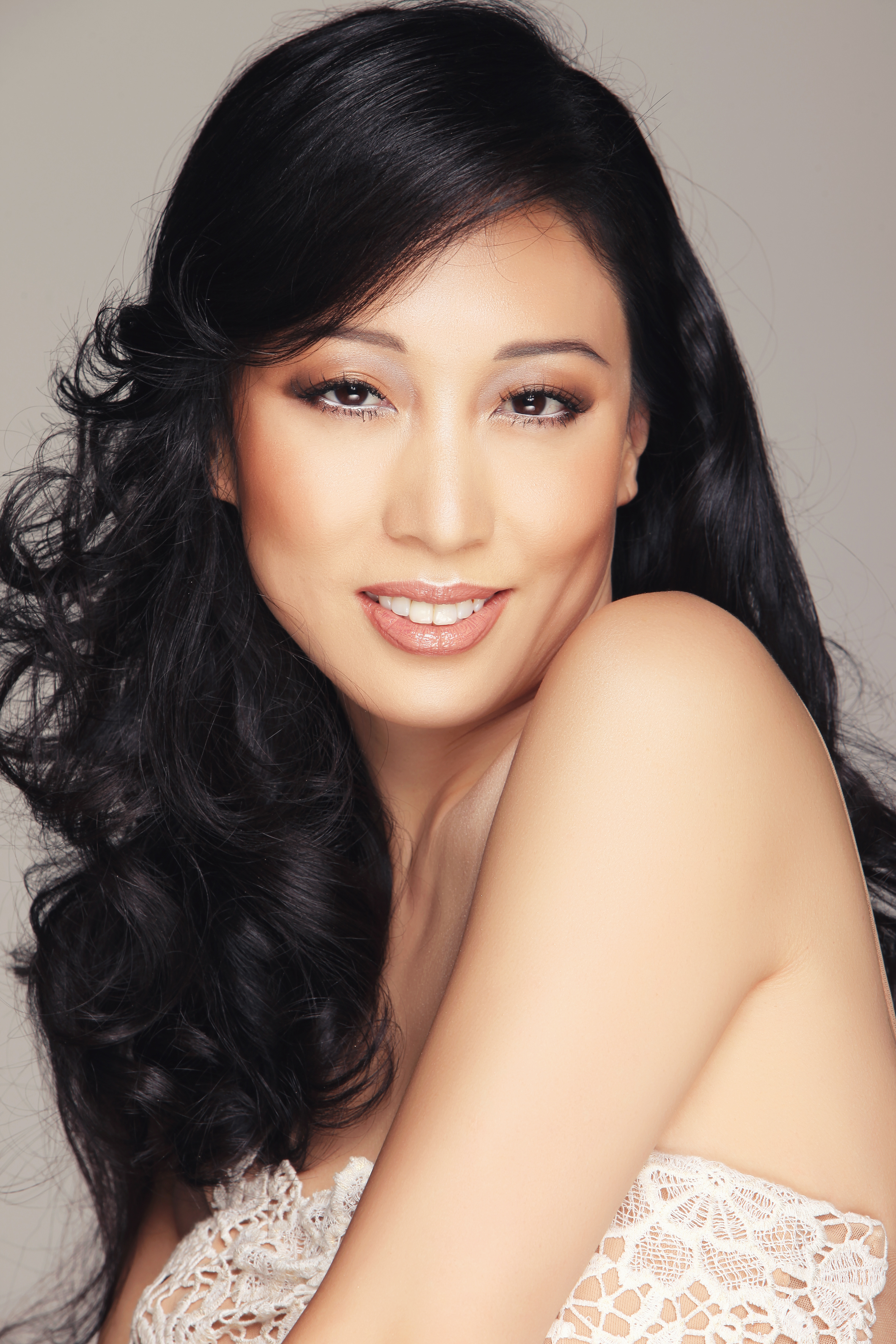
Judy Joo

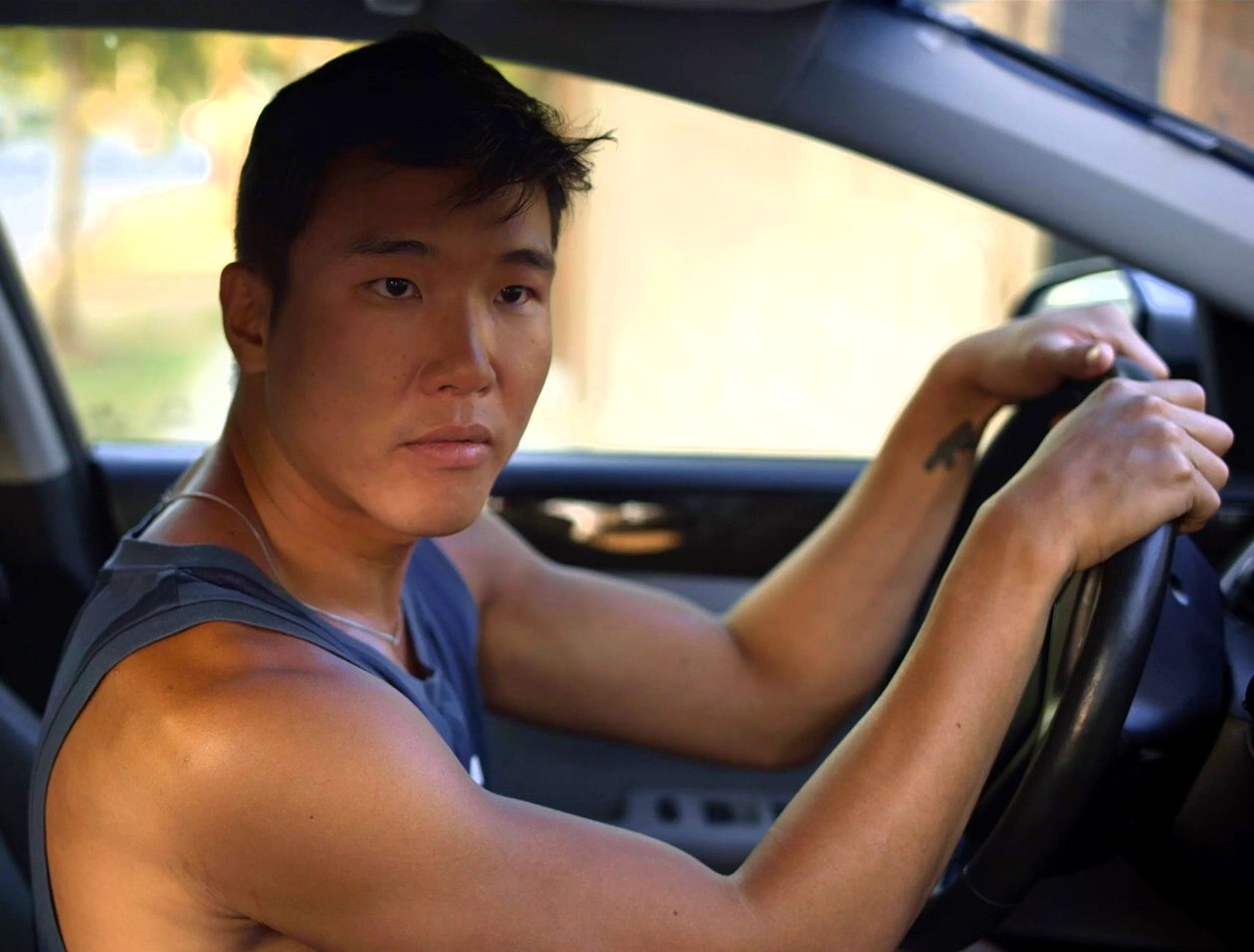
Joel Kim Booster

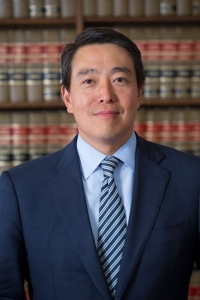
Joon Kim

Ronald Tae Sok Kim

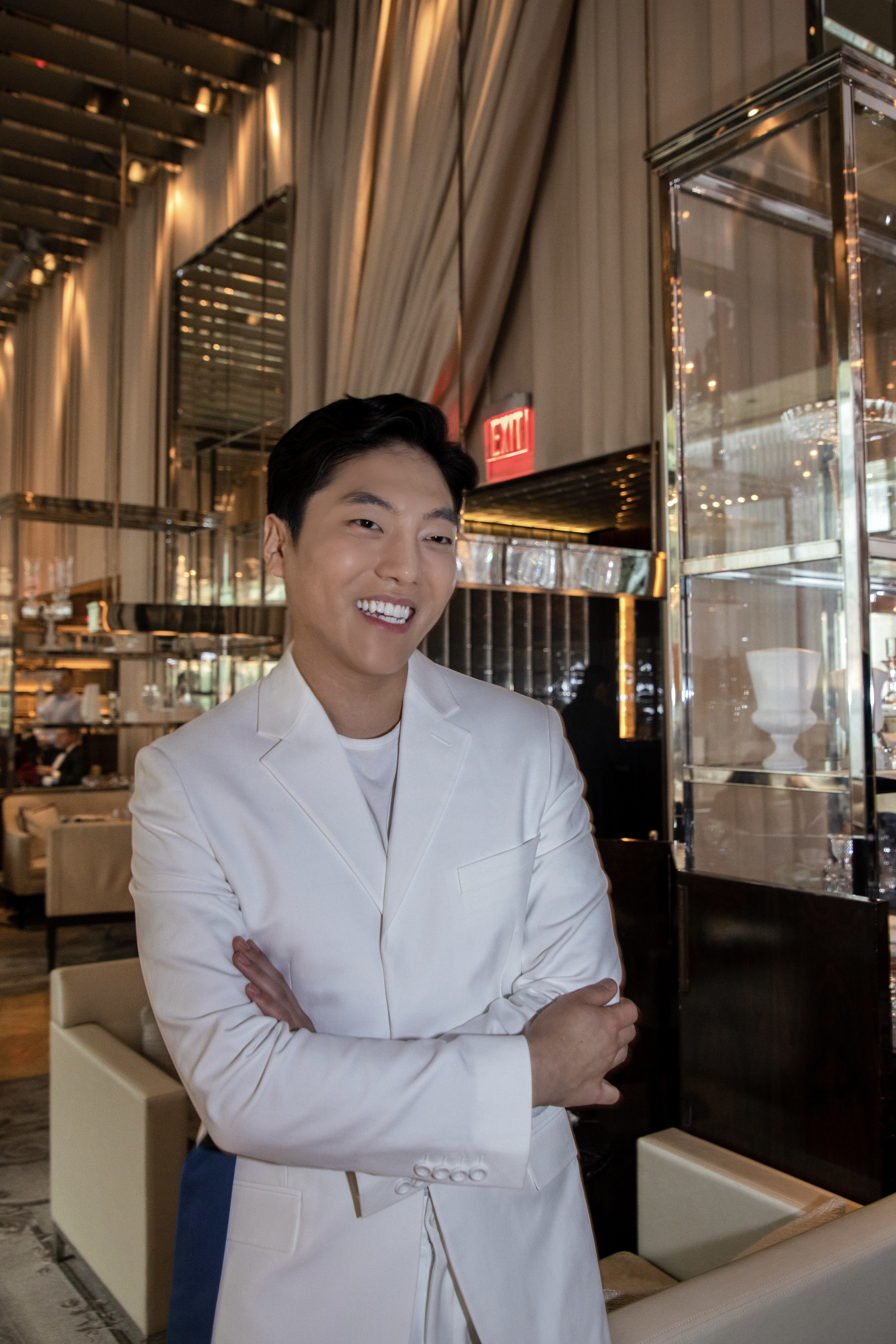
Andrew Kwon

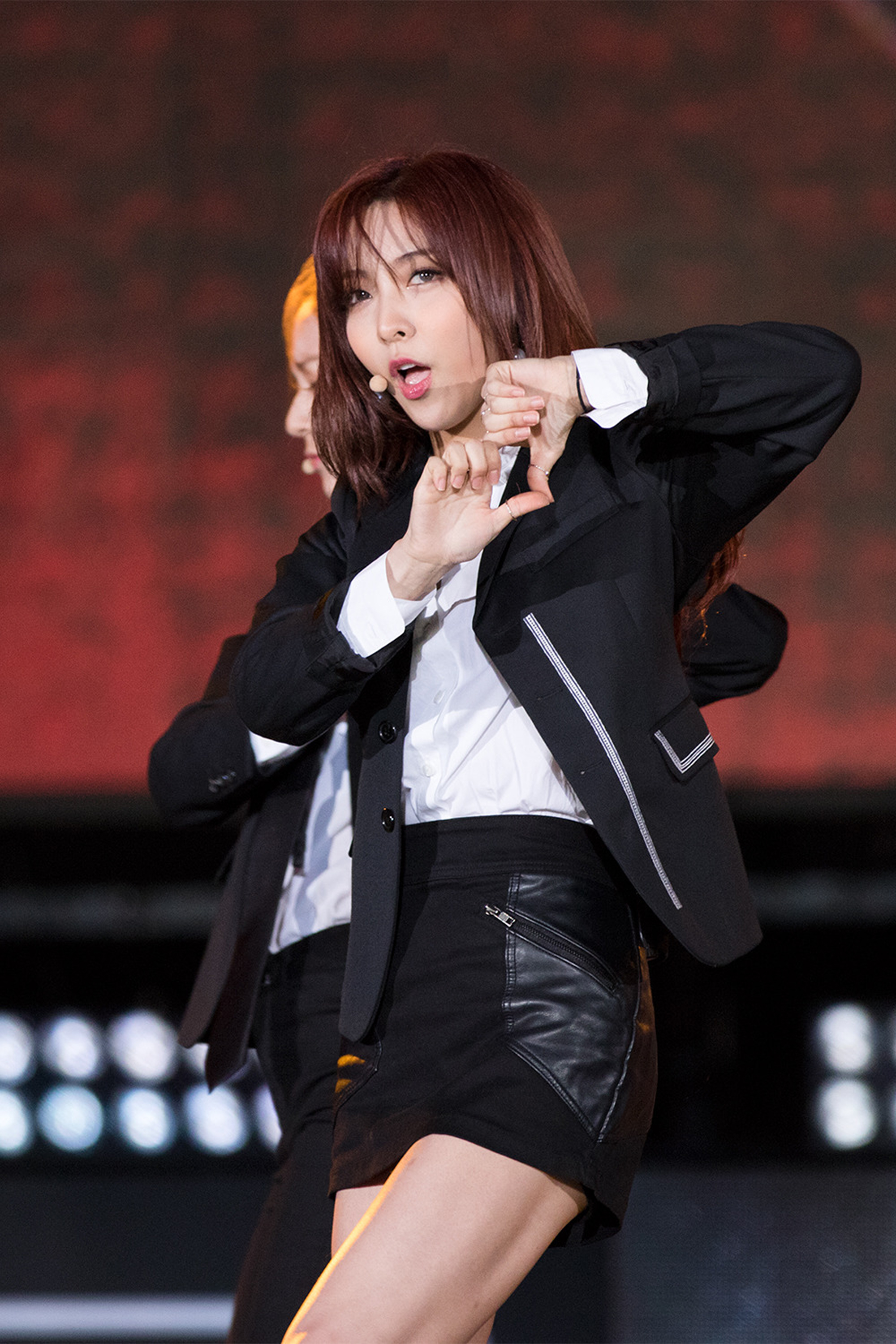
Luna

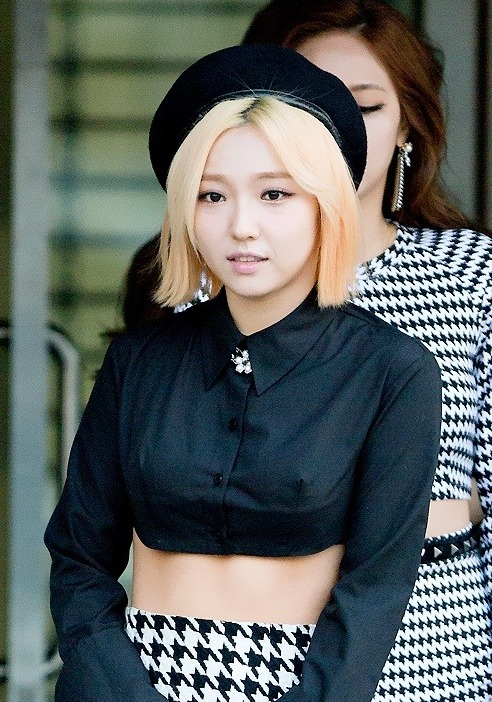
Min

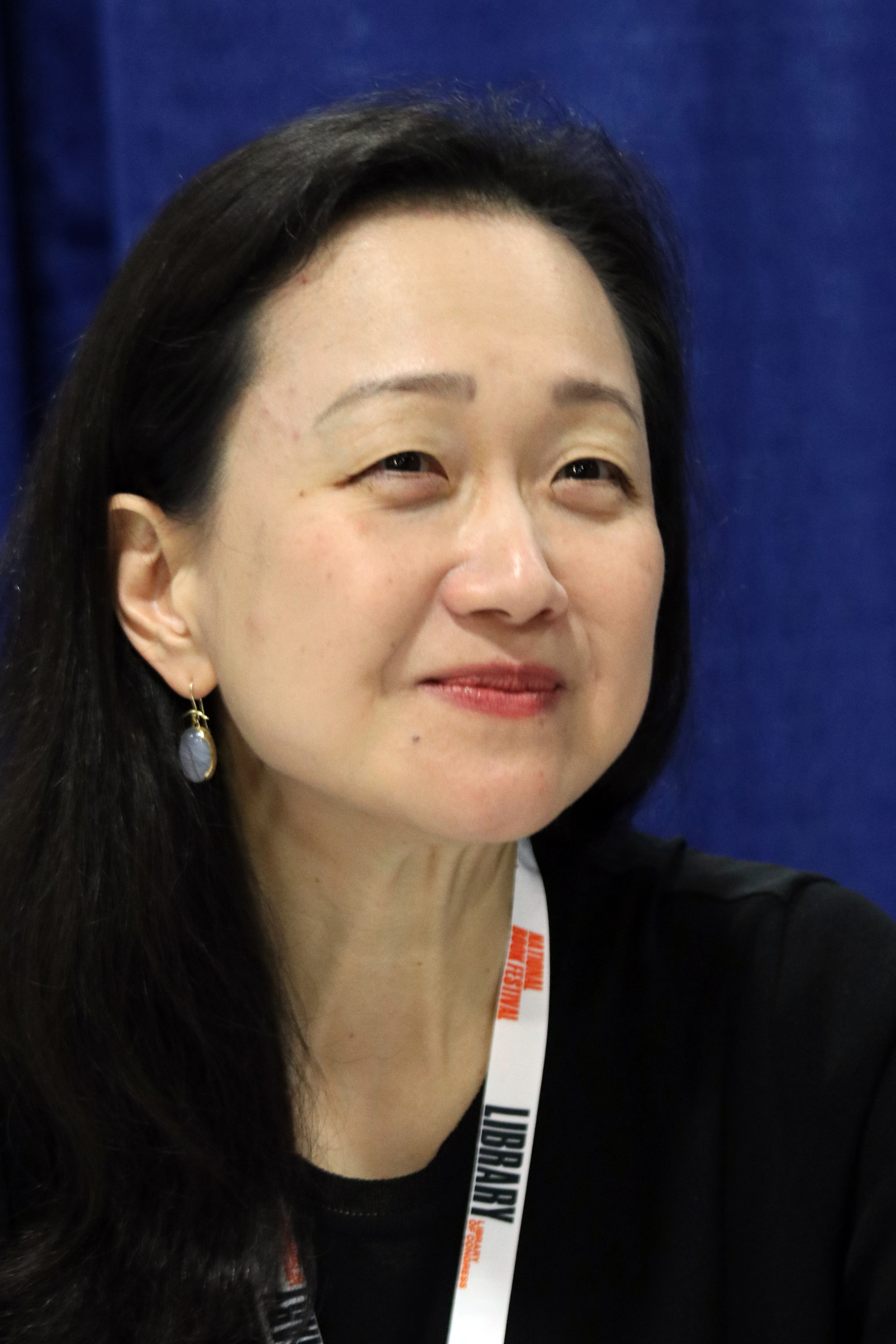
Min Jin Lee

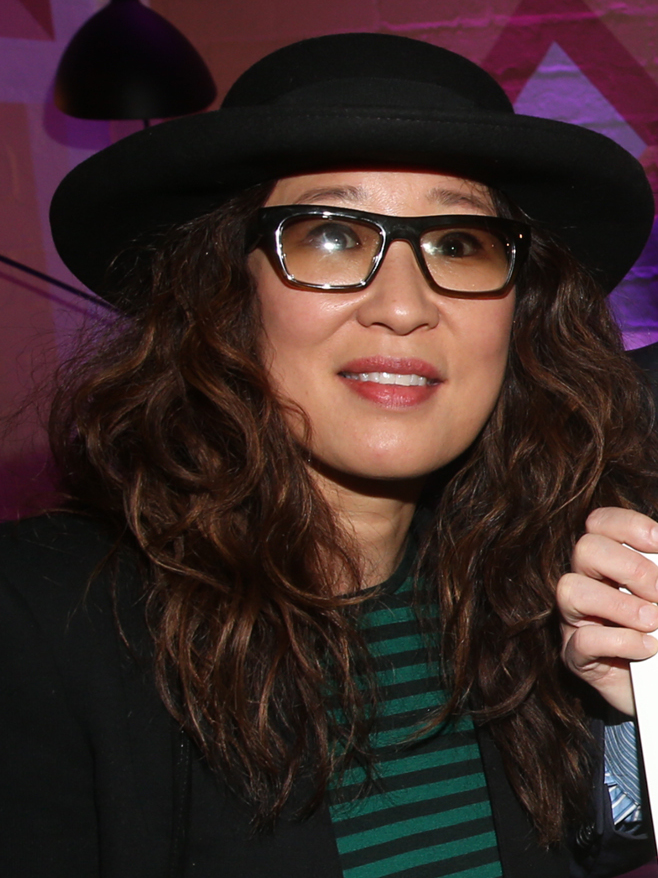
Sandra Oh

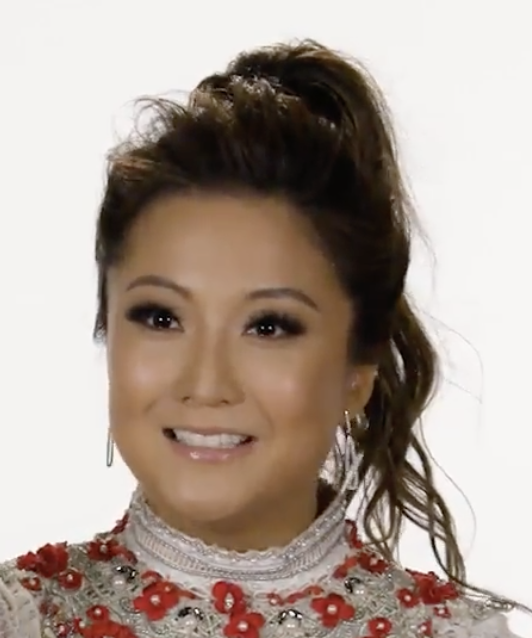
Ashley Park

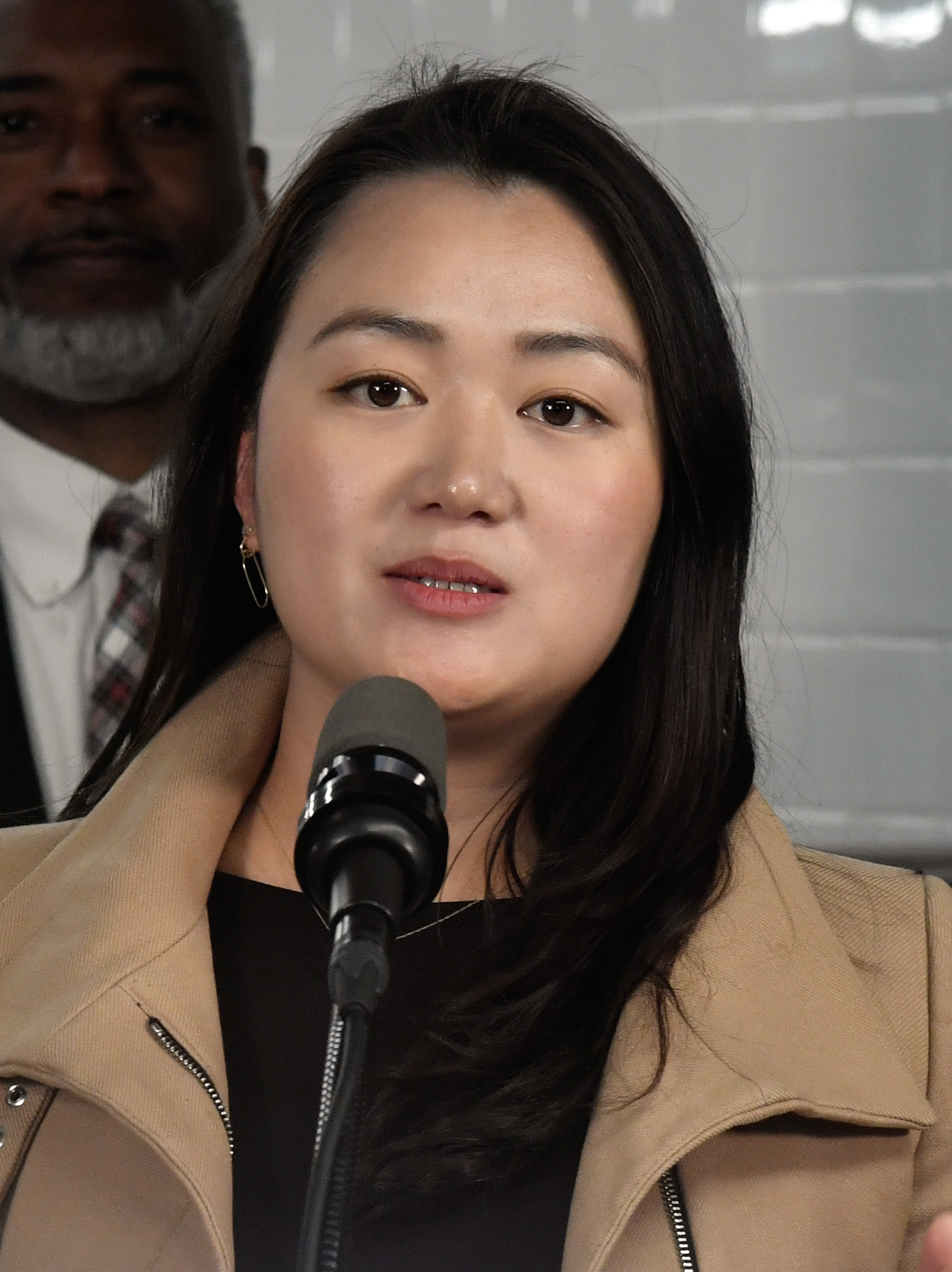
Julie Won

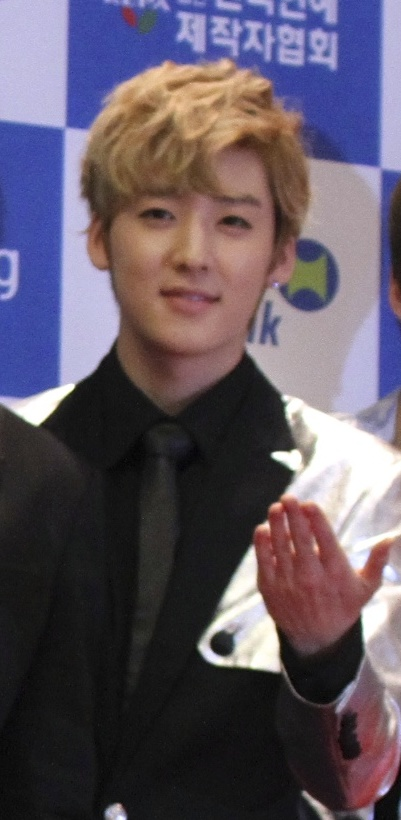
Kevin Woo
- Awkwafina – actress, rapper
- Joel Kim Booster – actor
- Justin Chae – CEO of New York-based Supernova: Creative & Crisis
- Richard Chai – fashion designer
- David Chang – international restaurateur
- Ronnie Cho – political consultant
- Jun Choi – former mayor of Edison, New Jersey
- Kyung Hee Choi – Vice President, Asian Health Services and Korean Medical Program (한국인의 의료 프로그램), Holy Name Medical Center, Teaneck, Bergen County, New Jersey
- MeeYoung Choi – Chief of North America and Korea, Transport Capital
- Susan Choi – novelist
- Alton Chun – executive manager, five-star luxury Hotel Park Hyatt New York in Midtown Manhattan
- Christopher Chung – the first elected mayor of Bergen County's Palisades Park, where Koreans constitute the majority of the population
- Bill Hwang – Wall Street investor in Tenafly in Bergen County, New Jersey
- Saeju Jeong – CEO, health fitness app Noom
- Susan Kang – associate professor of political science, John Jay College of Criminal Justice
- Gina Kim – borough clerk, Palisades Park, Bergen County, New Jersey
- Jean Kim – political lobbyist
- Joon Kim – acting United States Attorney for the Southern District of New York, 2017–2018
- Judy Kim – Manhattan state Supreme Court judge
- Kevin D. Kim – Commissioner, New York City Department of Small Business Services (SBS)
- Kyung Kim – chief operating officer, KFF Inc., parent company of Dons Bogam Korean barbeque restaurants in the New York metropolitan area
- Laura Kim – luxury fashion designer
- Ron Kim – member of the New York State Assembly, representing the 40th District, including Whitestone, Flushing, College Point, and Murray Hill in Queens
- Andrew Kwon – fashion designer
- Grace Lee – member of the New York State Assembly, representing the 65th District in Lower Manhattan, elected in November 2022
- Richard Lee – Commissioner, New York City Department of Finance, appointed by Mayor Zohran Mamdani in March 2026
- Carol Lim – fashion designer
- Luna – singer-songwriter and Broadway actress
- Min – singer-songwriter and Broadway actress
- Ashley Park – Broadway actress, dancer, and singer
- Ellen Park – member of the New Jersey State Assembly, representing Bergen County's 37th District, elected in November 2021
- Helen Park – composer and songwriter
- Jae Shin – actor
- Julie Won – councilwoman, New York City's 26th district in western Queens, elected in November 2021
- Kevin Woo – singer-songwriter, Broadway actor, and television host
- Rob Yang – actor
- Kyung Yoon – President and CEO, Korean American Community Foundation
- Michael Yun – councilman, Jersey City, elected in 2013

=== Media ===
Korean people have emerged prominently in the New York City journalism sphere. This media subsection has been created to acknowledge this professional prominence.

- Ashley Ahn – journalist, The New York Times
- Juju Chang – journalist, ABC News, anchor of Nightline
- Elizabeth Cho (disambiguate) – journalist, Bracha
- Liz Cho (disambiguate) – news anchor, WABC-TV
- Kelly Choi – anchor for NYC Media, the official public radio, television, and online media network and broadcasting service of the City of New York, and host of Secrets of New York
- Kay Chun – cooking editor, The New York Times
- Christine Chung – travel journalist, The New York Times
- Euny Hong – journalist, author of Birth of Korean Cool: How One Nation is Conquering the World Through Pop Culture (2014), which has been published in seven languages
- Judy Joo – chef and television personality
- Andrew Keh – journalist, The New York Times
- Eric Kim – food columnist, The New York Times
- Eugene Kim – CNBC
- Jasmine Kim – digital content journalist, CNBC
- Hakyung Kim – CNBC
- Irene Kim – fashion journalist and fashion model
- Michelle J. Kim – journalist and digital content producer, WNBC-TV
- Richard Kim – editor-in-chief, THE CITY
- Tae Kim – investing journalist, CNBC
- Kim Ye-rin – The Korea Herald
- Genevieve Ko – senior food editor, The New York Times
- Chang W. Lee – photojournalist, The New York Times
- Edmund Lee – journalist, The New York Times
- Karen Lee – weekend television anchor, News 12 New Jersey
- Min Jin Lee – author journalist
- MJ Lee – journalist, CNN
- Jeenah Moon – photojournalist, The New York Times
- Christina Park – journalist
- Ishle Yi Park – first female poet laureate of Queens, from 2004 to 2007
- Hannah Seo – journalist, The New York Times
- Hugh Son – journalist, CNBC
- Elisa Ung – award-winning food writer and restaurant critic
- Janice Yu – journalist, WABC-TV Eyewitness News

== See also ==
- Koreatown, Fort Lee
- Koreatown, Palisades Park
- Asian Americans in New York City
- Bangladeshis in New York City
- Chinese people in New York City
- Demographics of New York City
- Filipinos in the New York metropolitan area
- Fuzhounese in New York City
- Indians in the New York City metropolitan region
- Japanese in New York City
- Russians in New York City
- Taiwanese people in New York City

== Notes ==
- (in English) Kunieda, Mari (國枝 マリ; School of International Cultural Relations). "Assimilation to American Life vs.Maintenance of Mother Culture : Japanese and Korean Children in New York" (Japanese title: 異文化接触と母国文化 : 在ニューヨーク日本人・韓国人子女の場合). Hokkaido Tokai University Bulletin (北海道東海大学紀要): Humanities and social sciences (人文社会科学系) 1, 131–147, 1988. Hokkaido Tokai University. See profile at CiNii. Abstract in Japanese available.
- Min, Pyong Gap and Young I. Song. "Demographic Characteristics and Trends of Post-1965 Korean Immigrant Women and Men" (Chapter 5). In: Song, Young In and Ailee Moon (editors). Korean American Women: From Tradition to Modern Feminism. Greenwood Publishing Group, January 1, 1998. Start page 45. ISBN 0275959775, 9780275959777.
