= Andrew Kwon =

American fashion designer (born 1995)

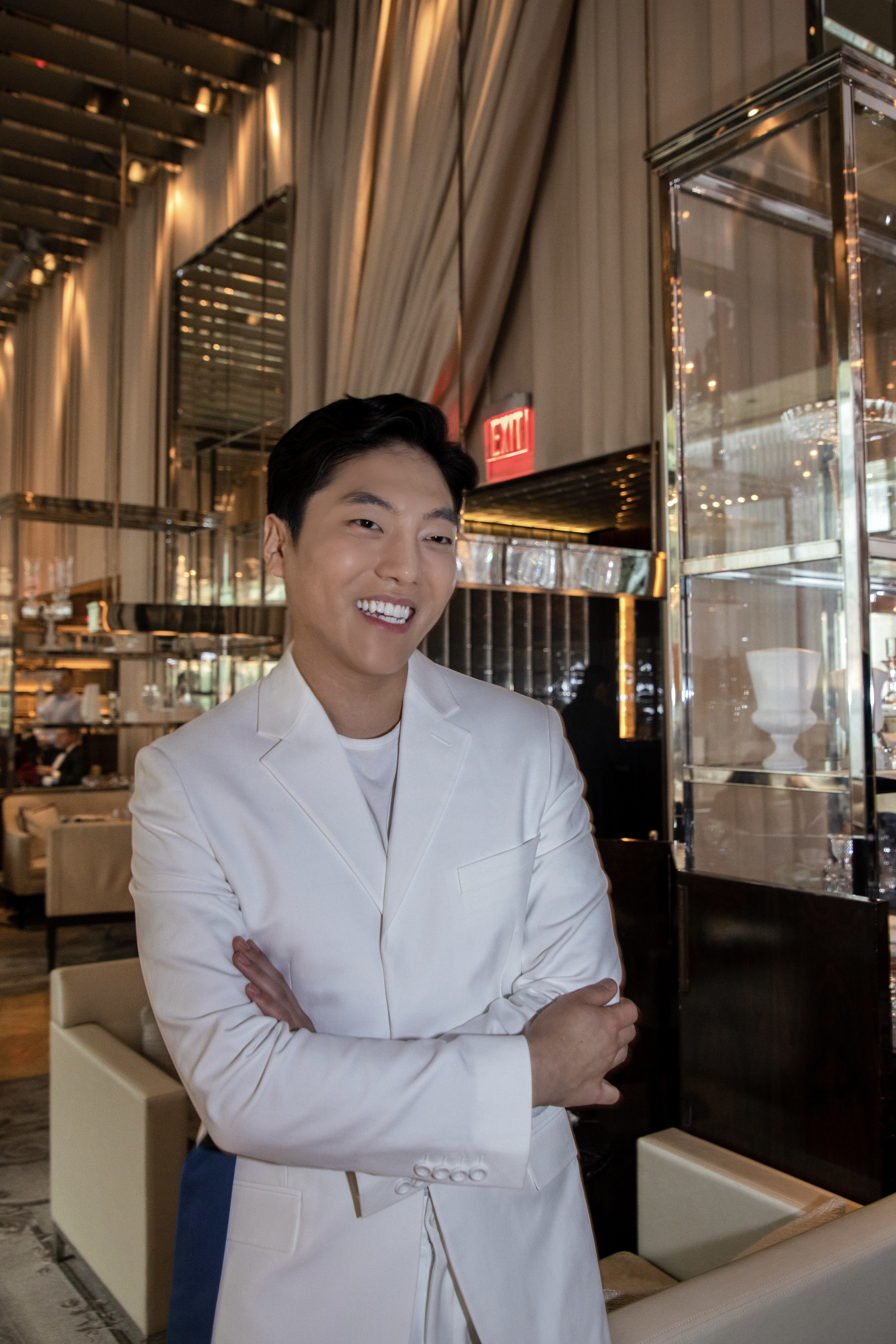
- Kwon at New York Fashion Week in 2022.
- Born: Andrew Jun O Kwon; September 23, 1995 (age 30); Colorado
- Education: Parsons School of Design
- Occupation: Fashion Designer
- Known for: Andrew Kwon
- Website: http://www.andrewkwon.com

Andrew Jun O Kwon (born 1995) is an American fashion designer based in New York, NY. He founded his label, ANDREW KWON, which focuses on demi-couture bridal and eveningwear. In 2024, Kwon was honored as part of Forbes' inaugural 30 Under 30, Class of 2025 North America.

== Early life and education ==
Born in 1995 in Denver, Colorado, Andrew Kwon spent his childhood in various parts of the United States.

Kwon attended Grandview High School in Aurora, Colorado. Post- high school graduation he attended Parsons the New School of Design and earned a Bachelor of Arts in fashion design in 2019. Kwon studied architecture and interior design at Parsons the New School for Design before switching his major to fashion design. During his studies, he participated in the Supima Design Competition, showcasing his collection at New York and Paris Fashion Weeks.

== Career ==
Kwon studied architecture at Parsons the New School for Design before switching his studies to fashion design.

His career began with internships at Vera Wang, Marchesa, and Chloe. Post-graduation, he launched ANDREW KWON in 2021 during the COVID-19 pandemic with a bridal collection. His designs have been seen in publications including Vogue, Brides, Women's Wear Daily (WWD), and Elle.

His first eveningwear collection was showcased at New York Fashion Week in September 2022 at The Baccarat Hotel. His fourth collection was presented at Bridal Fashion Week in New York City. In 2023, he debuted his second eveningwear collection at New York Fashion Week, his first runway show.

In 2023, Kwon was invited by the Council of Fashion Designers of America (CFDA) to become an Interim Member. During New York Bridal Fashion Week in April 2023, Kwon, in collaboration with Manolo Blahnik, unveiled his sixth collection, "Collection 6 - epiphany," a bridal collection." He also ventured into e-commerce through a partnership with Moda Operandi, featuring selections from his collections.

In September 2023, Kwon was selected as a finalist for the Inaugural CFDA x Genesis House AAPI Design and Innovation Grant Fund in partnership with Genesis in 2023.

== Appearances ==
At the 2023 Independent Spirit Awards, Regina Hall wore a design by Kwon. At the premiere of "Shazam! Fury of the Gods", Lucy Liu wore a custom gown by Kwon. In March 2023 at the Elton John Aids Foundation Oscars Viewing Party, Sophia Bush wore Kwon's gown to the event. Ashley Park wore a custom gown by Kwon to Vogue Singapore's NEXT IN VOGUE Gala.

Music, notably from Andrea Bocelli and his mother, has been cited by Kwon as a significant inspiration for his designs. Singer Loren Allred wore Kwon’s designs during the Andrea Bocelli 2021Tour.

Jessica Jung wore Kwon's design in Manhattan, New York. Son Tae Young wore Kwon's design attending his show in October 2023 documented on YouTube.

Lana Condor wore Kwon's design to the 2023 Unforgettable Gala held in Beverly Hills, California.

Actress Constance Wu, notable for one of many box office hits including her role as Rachel Chu in Crazy Rich Asians and as Destiny in Hustlers alongside co-star Jennifer Lopez wore Kwon's design for her honoring at Apex For Youth's 23rd Inspiration Awards Gala in April 2024, past honorees include Eileen Gu, Connie Chung, Eva Chen, Awkwafina, and Gemma Chan.

Killers of the Flower Moon, Actress Lily Gladstone, wore a black velvet gown by Kwon to the Irish Film & Academy Awards with a hummingbird detail that Gladstone says was symbolic of her father's name in Blackfeet.

Kwon made an appearance as himself on Netflix in Super Rich In Korea as a friend of cast member Aren Yoo (Yoo Hee-ra).

Chrissy Teigen wore Andrew Kwon to the Fourth Annual 2024 Academy Museum Gala alongside husband John Legend.

== Personal life ==
Kwon's full name is Andrew "Jun O" Kwon. As an Asian American, Kwon participates in dialogues concerning the Asian American and Pacific Islander (AAPI) community.

== See also ==
- Koreans in New York City
