= Paschal's La Carousel =

Jazz club in Atlanta, Georgia, United States

Paschal's La Carrousel
- Location in Atlanta
- Address: 830 Martin Luther King, Jr. Drive; Atlanta, Georgia; United States
- Coordinates: 33°44′57″N 84°24′12″W
- Owner: Robert and James Paschal
- Capacity: 200
- Type: Jazz club

Construction
- Opened: 1960
- Closed: 1996

Paschal's La Carrousel was a jazz club in Atlanta, Georgia. Opened in 1960, it became known as Atlanta's "jazz mecca" as it featured top-name artists such as Aretha Franklin, Dizzy Gillespie, Gladys Knight, and Jimmy Smith. It was the only nightclub in Atlanta open to blacks in the then-segregated city. At the same time, an estimated 60 percent of its clientele were white, and the club also showed tolerance toward homosexuals. The club was owned by brothers Robert and James Paschal, who also ran the Paschal's Restaurant next door and, in 1967, a 125-room motor hotel which they added to the premises. The restaurant, lounge, and motel closed in 1996 and were sold to Clark Atlanta University for use as a student dormitory and conference centre. An event space resembling the original La Carrousel lounge was installed at Paschal's at Castleberry Hill, which opened in 2002.

== History ==
Brothers Robert and James Paschal opened their original Paschal's sandwich shop in 1947 on West Hunter Street in Atlanta (today 837 Martin Luther King, Jr. Drive). Only sandwiches and soda were sold in the 30-seat luncheonette, which the brothers expanded to 75 seats in 1948. By the late 1950s the business had outgrown its location, and in 1959 the brothers opened a larger facility across the street at what is today 830 Martin Luther King, Jr. Drive. Paschal's Restaurant became known for its soul food menu, including fried chicken, collard greens, cornbread, and sweet potato pie. The restaurant often hosted Martin Luther King Jr. and his associates during the Civil Rights Movement, and was noted for being a place that whites and blacks could both visit, as well as being tolerant of homosexuals.

In 1960 the Paschal brothers opened the La Carrousel Lounge, a jazz venue, adjacent to the restaurant. The lounge attracted top-name jazz performers and, like the restaurant, was open to whites and blacks alike in the then-segregated city. In 1967, the Paschal brothers expanded the property further with a 125-room motel, fulfilling their vision of providing "food, drink, merriment, entertainment, and a place to rest up for more all within the confines of one complex". The restaurant, lounge, and motel were closed in 1996 and the property was sold for $3 million to Clark Atlanta University, which converted it into a student dormitory and conference centre.

== Description ==
With seating for 200, Paschal's La Carrousel was known as an "intimate" lounge where performers established a close rapport with club-goers. It was also the only nightclub open to blacks in the then-segregated city. It was well known for being integrated as well, as an estimated 60 percent of its clientele were white. Though the Paschal brothers had "colored only" business and liquor licenses, they served to both black and white customers, who were often seated at the same tables. Celebrities who frequented the club included Muhammad Ali, Gayle Sayers, and Jayne Mansfield.

== Performers ==
Paschal's La Carrousel was considered the "jazz mecca" of Atlanta in the 1960s and early 1970s. Top-name performers who appeared at La Carrousel Lounge included: Cannonball Adderley, Aretha Franklin, Erroll Garner, Dizzy Gillespie, Herbie Hancock, Ahmad Jamal, Quincy Jones, Gladys Knight, Ramsey Lewis, Russell Malone, Wes Montgomery, Lou Rawls, Horace Silver, Jimmy Smith, The Three Sounds, Stanley Turrentine, and Joe Williams. In its later years, the club drew large crowds on weeknights as well as weekends by alternating sets between visiting performers and local groups.

Jimmy Smith's live album The Boss was recorded at Paschal's La Carrousel in 1968, featuring Smith on organ, George Benson and Nathan Page on guitar, and Donald Bailey on drums.

== Sources ==
- Chenault, Wesley; Braukman, Stacy (2008). Gay and Lesbian Atlanta. Arcadia Publishing. ISBN 978-0738553771.
- McClellan, Lawrence (2004). The Later Swing Era, 1942 to 1955. Greenwood Publishing Group. ISBN 0313301573.
- Smith, Jessie Carney, ed. (2006). Encyclopedia of African American Business. Vol. I. Greenwood Publishing Group. ISBN 0313331103.
