= The Boss (Jimmy Smith album) =

Live album by Jimmy Smith
- Released: November 20, 1968
- Recorded: 1968
- Venue: Paschal's La Carousel, Atlanta, GA
- Genre: Jazz
- Length: 37:45
- Label: Verve
- Producer: Esmond Edwards

Jimmy Smith chronology
| Jimmy Smith Plays the Standards (1968) | The Boss (1968) | Livin' It Up (1968) |

The Boss is a 1968 live album by American jazz organist Jimmy Smith.

== Reception ==
The Allmusic review by Roy Wynn awarded the album three stars and said:

"Lots of fine solos. George Benson does best soul-jazz work since McDuff days"

Professional ratings
Review scores
| Source | Rating |
|---|---|
| Allmusic | 3/5 stars |

== Track listing ==
1. "The Boss" (Jimmy Smith) – 7:55
2. "This Guy's in Love With You" (Burt Bacharach, Hal David) – 8:48
3. "Some of My Best Friends Are Blues" (Smith) – 5:52
4. "Fingers" (Smith) – 10:30
5. "Tuxedo Junction" (Buddy Feyne, Erskine Hawkins, Bill Johnson, Julian Dash) – 9:29

- Recorded at Paschal's La Carousel, Atlanta, Georgia

== Personnel ==
=== Musicians ===
- Jimmy Smith – organ
- George Benson – guitar
- Nathen Page – guitar (track 4)
- Donald Bailey – drums

=== Technical ===
- Esmond Edwards – producer
- Val Valentin – director of engineering
- Mike Mendel – cover design
- Sid Maurer – art direction
