= Nathen Page =

American jazz musician

Nathen Page (August 23, 1937 – 2003) was an American jazz guitarist.

== Career ==
A native of Leetown, West Virginia, Page taught himself to play guitar in childhood. He discovered jazz when he was a member of the U.S. Army. After leaving the Army, he moved to Washington D.C., where he worked in rock bands. He joined the Jimmy Smith band in 1965 and recorded on the album The Boss. During the 1970s he worked with Kenny Barron, Roberta Flack, Herbie Mann, Jackie McLean, Rene McLean, Sonny Rollins, and Charles Tolliver. He moved to Orlando, Florida, and recorded for his label, Hugo Music.

== Discography ==
=== As leader ===
- Page 1 (Hugo's Music, 1977)
- Page 2 (Hugo's Music, 1978)
- Plays Pretty for the People (Hugo's Music, 1979)
- Page-ing Nathen (Hugo's Music, 1982)
- A Page of Ellington (Hugo's Music, 1985)
- The Other Page (Hugo's Music, 1991)
- Season's Greetings (Hugo's Music, 1997)

=== As sideman ===
With Jimmy Smith

- The Boss (Verve, 1968)

With Charles Tolliver

- Compassion (Strata-East, 1977)
