= Paschal's =

Coordinates: 33.7544°N 84.4148°W

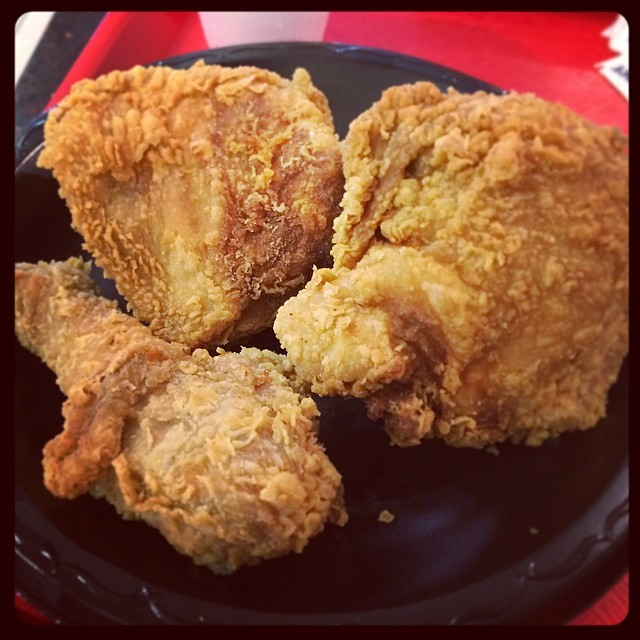
- Paschal's fried chicken

Restaurant information
- Established: 1947
- Food type: Southern
- Location: 180-B Northside Drive, Atlanta, Georgia, United States
- Other locations: 830 Martin Luther King, Jr. Drive

Paschal's is an American foodservice company based in Atlanta, Georgia, specializing in Southern cuisine. It was founded as a small sandwich shop in 1947 by brothers Robert and James Paschal, who worked together on their foodservice ventures for over 50 years until Robert's death in 1997. James Paschal continued to preside over the company until his death in 2008. Today Paschal's operates a restaurant in the Castleberry Hill section of Atlanta, a foodservice outlet at Hartsfield–Jackson Atlanta International Airport, and is a food vendor for other US airports and grocery stores.

== Early history ==
=== Sandwich shop ===
In 1947 the Paschal brothers, Robert (1909–1997) and James (1920–2008), originally from Thomson, Georgia, opened Paschal's Sandwich Shop at 837 West Hunter Street (since renamed Martin Luther King, Jr. Drive) in Atlanta. Located in the black business district in proximity to downtown, the luncheonette had no kitchen space; Robert prepared the food at his home and sent it by taxi to the shop, as the brothers did not own a car. Only sandwiches and soda were on the menu, and the house specialty was a 52-cent fried chicken sandwich which was Robert's own recipe. The following year, the brothers acquired an adjoining property to bring seating capacity up to 75.

=== Restaurant ===
The sandwich shop was a success and by the late 1950s the business was in need of larger quarters. In 1959 the brothers moved the operation across the street to a larger facility at what is today 830 Martin Luther King, Jr. Drive. In 1966, Ebony magazine described Paschal's Restaurant as a "large attractive brick building with soda fountain and booths in front and a large dining room in the rear". With Robert serving as head chef and recipe developer, the restaurant became known for its soul food menu, including fried chicken, collard greens, cornbread, sweet potato pie, and peach cobbler.

The restaurant was noted for being a place where whites and blacks were welcome, as were homosexuals. It was one of the first to seat black and white customers at the same tables, in an era when segregated seating was the norm. Although Paschal's had "colored only" business and liquor licenses, the brothers openly disregarded the law and served white and black clientele alike.

The restaurant was the unofficial headquarters for the Civil Rights Movement during the 1960s. Martin Luther King Jr. and other civil rights leaders frequently convened here for strategy sessions, planning their protest marches, sit-ins, and voter registration drives. Notable patrons included Andrew Young, John Lewis, Julian Bond, Adam Clayton Powell Jr., Stokely Carmichael, Fannie Lou Hamer, Reverends Joseph Lowery and Jesse L. Jackson, Maynard H. Jackson, and Ralph Abernathy. Activists decompressed at Paschal's after "arrests, death threats and beatings", according to Lewis. The Paschal brothers kept the restaurant open all night as a safe haven for black activists returning from jail and as a meeting point for their families. They also posted bond and served free meals for activists. Strategy meetings also took place in the restaurant among white politicians, including Ted Kennedy, Hubert Humphrey, Richard Nixon, and Bill Clinton.

=== Jazz club ===
In 1960 the Paschal brothers opened the La Carousel Lounge adjacent to the restaurant. The 200-seat venue attracted many top jazz performers, such as Aretha Franklin, Dizzy Gillespie, Ramsey Lewis, and Joe Williams, and was considered Atlanta's "jazz mecca" in the 1960s and early 1970s. La Carousel was the only nightclub in Atlanta open to black patrons and, like the restaurant, was fully integrated. Celebrity patrons included Muhammad Ali, Gayle Sayers, and Jayne Mansfield.

=== Motel ===
In 1967 the Paschal brothers erected a six-story, 125-room motel on the property, completing their vision of providing "food, drink, merriment, entertainment, and a place to rest up for more all within the confines of one complex". The $2 million motel – the first African-American owned and operated motel in the city – had banquet space for 350, another 160-seat dining room, and a swimming pool. Upon the motel's opening, Room 101 was permanently set aside for Martin Luther King's use. During his 1968 presidential campaign, Robert F. Kennedy maintained an office in the motel and also slept there. Jesse Jackson initiated the planning sessions for his 1984 presidential campaign at the motel. A 1975 article reported that the motel had 92 percent occupancy most of the year.

The restaurant, lounge, and motel were closed in 1996. The property was sold for $3 million to Clark Atlanta University, which converted the motel into a student dormitory and conference centre named The Paschal Center. The restaurant's recipes were included in the sale, and Robert's fried chicken continued to be served in the restaurant to students and the public. The university closed the restaurant in 2003 and planned to demolish it, but public outcry led to a $100,000 (equivalent to $167,500 in 2025) congressional grant to save the historic structure. In 2004 plans were announced to open a Busy Bee Café at Historic Paschal's.

== Modern day ==
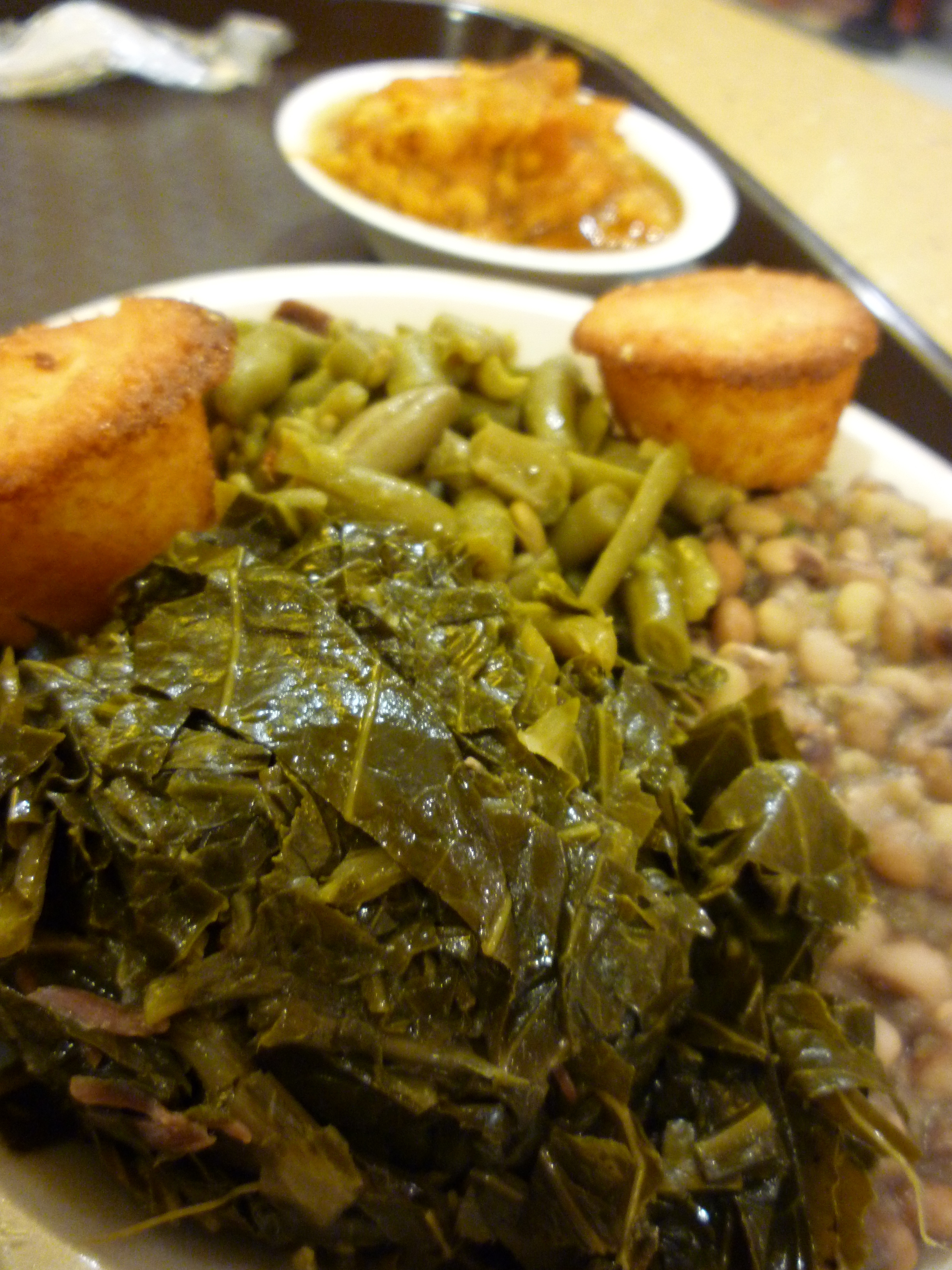
Southern cuisine at Paschal's Atlanta airport location

In 1980 a joint venture of Paschal's and Dobbs House Inc., called Dobbs-Paschal Midfield Corporation, was awarded a 15-year contract to provide foodservice at Hartsfield–Jackson Atlanta International Airport. In 1995 Paschal's partnered with Concessions International to continue to run foodservice outlets at the airport. By 2008, Paschal's and its partners were providing foodservice to a total of 18 U.S. airports.

In 2002 James Paschal and Herman J. Russell opened a $6 million Paschal's Restaurant on Northside Drive in the Castleberry Hill neighborhood of Atlanta. An event space resembling the original La Carousel Lounge was installed in this restaurant.

Also in 2002, Paschal's Foods Inc. began selling Paschal's World Famous Chicken Batter Mix on its website and in select stores. Paschal's Foods also sells some items to local grocery stores, including Kroger, Publix, and Harry's Farmers Market. Like the restaurant, this is primarily Southern cuisine.
