= Lemon pepper =

Seasoning made from lemon zest and black pepper

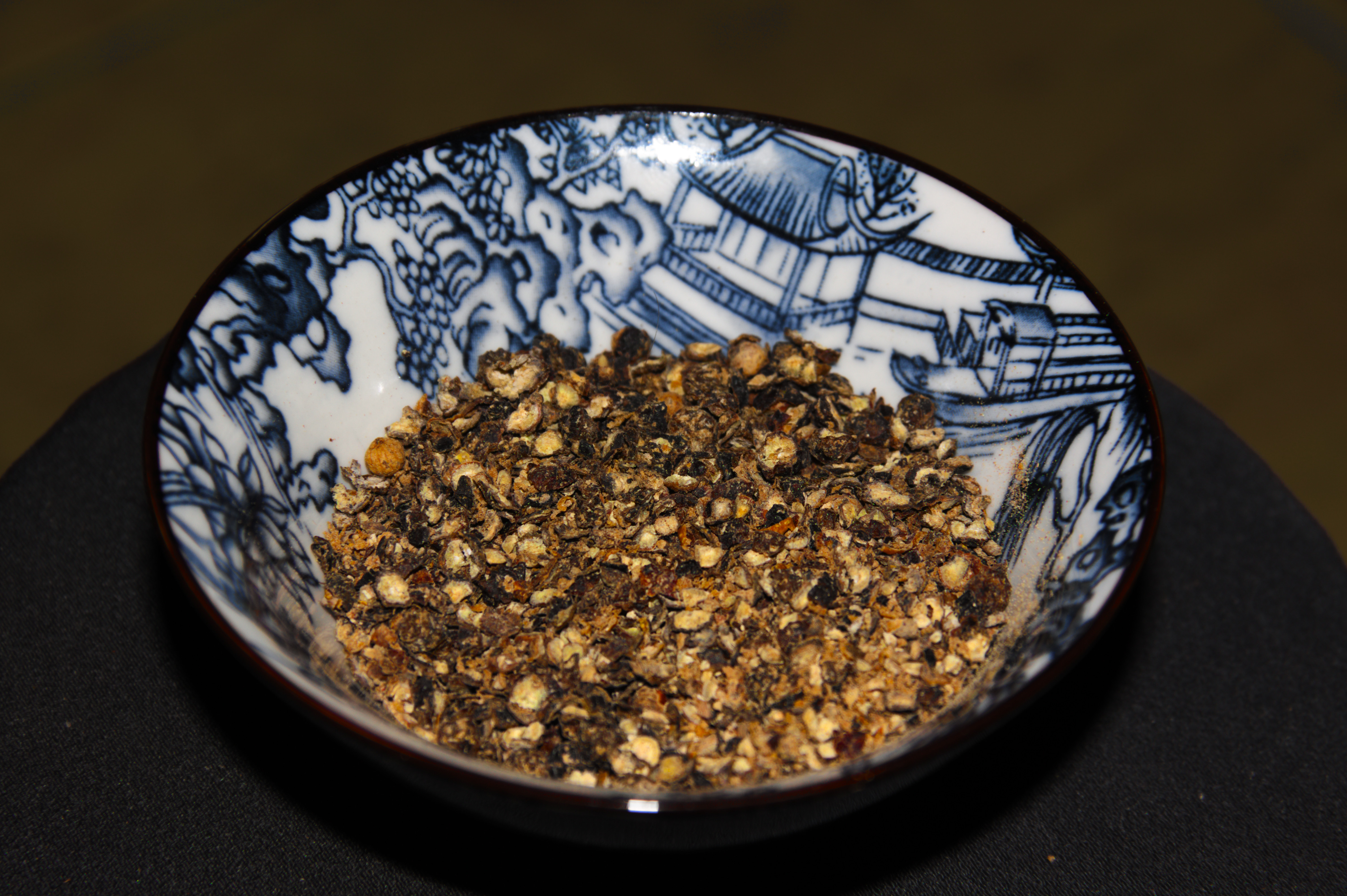
Homemade lemon pepper seasoning made by crushing lemon zest with black pepper grains.

Lemon pepper (also known as lemon pepper seasoning) is a spice blend made from granulated lemon zest and cracked black peppercorns. The lemon zest is mashed with the pepper so that the citrus oil infuses into the pepper. The mixture is then baked and dried. Lemon pepper can be used on meats—particularly poultry—and pasta, although it was originally used primarily for seafood. It is also a popular flavor for chicken wings, especially in American cuisine.

== History ==
Lemon pepper seasoning was commercially launched in July 1967 by William Shoffeitt, a product engineer based in Healdsburg, California. Shoffeitt developed the blend as part of his company, Shoffeitt’s Enhance Seasoners. His product gained regional popularity along the West Coast of the United States and was promoted at food trade shows and sold at major department stores including Sears and JCPenney.

== Composition ==
While lemon zest and black pepper are the primary ingredients, commercial and homemade variations may include:

- Salt
- Sugar
- Onion powder
- Garlic powder
- Citric acid
- Natural or artificial lemon flavoring
- Cayenne pepper
- Other spices or preservatives

Homemade lemon pepper seasoning recipes vary widely and are often customized to taste.

== Usage ==
Lemon pepper is commonly used to season:

- Grilled or baked chicken
- Pasta dishes
- Grilled or baked fish (especially salmon or tilapia)
- Roasted vegetables
- Potato dishes
- Popcorn and snack mixes

Lemon pepper chicken wings are a notable variant in American bar and sports cuisine, especially popular in cities like Atlanta.

== See also ==
- Lemon chicken
- List of spices
- Seasoning
