= Eric B. Kim =

Korean-American businessman (born 1954)

- Born: 1954 (age 71–72); Seoul, South Korea
- Education: Physics master's in engineering MBA
- Alma mater: Harvey Mudd College; UCLA; Harvard Business School
- Occupation: Businessman

Korean name
- Hangul: 김병국
- RR: Gim Byeongguk
- MR: Kim Pyŏngguk

Eric B. Kim (Korean: 김병국; born 1954) is a Korean American businessman in the technology field.

== Life ==
Kim was born in Seoul, South Korea, in 1954. At the age of 11, his family moved to Los Angeles, in the United States. He majored in physics at Harvey Mudd College, and went on to earn a master's in engineering at UCLA and an MBA from the Harvard Business School.

Kim worked for a number of companies in his early career. He was general manager of database products at software firm Lotus Development, President and CEO of Pilot Software, a part of business information provider Dun & Bradstreet, and a member of venture-capitalist firm Spencer Trask Software Group.

Kim moved back to South Korea to join Samsung Electronics in 1999, where during a tenure of five years he rose to become leader of their global marketing initiatives. Kim was instrumental in generating brand visibility worldwide for Samsung with its "DigitAll-Everyone's Invited" campaign.

He moved back to the United States in 2004, when Intel hired him as their chief marketing officer. His role later shifted to heading Intel's digital home initiative, as a senior vice president and general manager of the Digital Home Group.

In June 2010 he left Intel to join Soraa as its CEO. He remained in that role until May 2013.
