= Paul Luna =

Paul Luna (born c. 1966) is a Dominican-American chef, restaurateur, author, and political activist. In Atlanta during the 1990s he opened and operated a number of successful restaurants featuring European, Mediterranean, and South American cuisine, including Luna Sí, Eclipse di Luna, and Loca Luna. In 2009 he opened a training kitchen for refugee women, Lunacy Black Market, in downtown Atlanta.

== Early life ==
Luna was born circa 1966 in the Dominican Republic, to middle-class parents. He was one of 13 siblings. He is of Italian and Spanish heritage.

== Career ==
Luna moved to Atlanta in 1992 and opened Bice, a Milan-based, upscale Italian restaurant chain.

In 1993 he opened his first proprietary restaurant, Luna Sí, on Peachtree Road. He introduced new types of European, Mediterranean, and South American cuisine, and tapas, to Atlanta, through his restaurants Luna Sí, Eclipse di Luna (opened in 1997), and Loca Luna (opened in 1999).

He was a controversial figure on the Atlanta restaurant scene in the 1990s, often critical of local trendiness and faddish tastes. He was widely known as a "bad boy" who ruled his dining room impetuously, sometimes staging impromptu striptease dances to amuse and shock patrons.

Luna left Atlanta in late 2002, and worked as a chef in Canada, Washington, D.C., Hawaii, and California.

He returned to Atlanta in 2009, and opened Lunacy Black Market.

In 2009, Luna wrote and published a bilingual children’s book, Luna Needs a Miracle! ¡Luna Necesita un Milagro!

== Advocacy and philanthropy ==
Luna advocated small businesses run by mixed-income, multi-national owners as the way to rejuvenate Atlanta's historic downtown area. "We're still segregated," he said; "All my white customers think, downtown: black. Period."

Luna's tenure with Four Seasons Resort Maui at Wailea, Hawaii gave him the opportunity to lead cooking classes for children through the Big Brothers Big Sisters of Maui program.

In 2009 he opened a training kitchen for refugee women, Lunacy Black Market, a low-cost restaurant in downtown Atlanta. He worked with BryAnn Chen, executive director of Refugee Women's Network, to identify appropriate candidates for employment in this restaurant. It closed in 2014, a year after Luna moved to Switzerland.

Beginning in 2010, Luna declared for a few years that he would run for mayor of Atlanta.

== Personal life ==
Luna is married to Cynthia T. Luna. After she moved to Switzerland, Luna moved there as well in 2013 to be with her.
