= Eric Kim (food writer) =

American food writer

Eric Joonho Kim (born 1991) is an American food writer and recipe developer who writes for The New York Times.

== Early life ==
Kim grew up in Alpharetta, Georgia before attending New York University, where he studied creative writing and literature. Subsequently, in 2015, he earned master's degrees in English and Comparative Literature from Columbia University, having once pursued a Ph.D.

== Career ==
After graduation, Kim worked at Food Network before moving to Food52, where he wrote the "Table for One" column from 2018 to 2020. In 2021, he joined The New York Times as a cooking columnist. There, he developed a recipe for gochujang caramel cookies, which gained viral traction.

In 2022, Kim published Korean American, a cookbook interspersing Korean American recipes with stories from his life. He had spent nearly a year back home learning recipes from and developing recipes with his mother for the book.

== Personal life ==
Kim currently resides in Brooklyn, New York City with his dog Quentin Compson. He is gay, having come out to his parents when he was 24.

== Works ==
- Korean American: Food That Tastes Like Home (2022)
- Spaghetti Junction (2027)
