= Old Korean Legation Museum =

Historic house museum in Washington, D.C., US

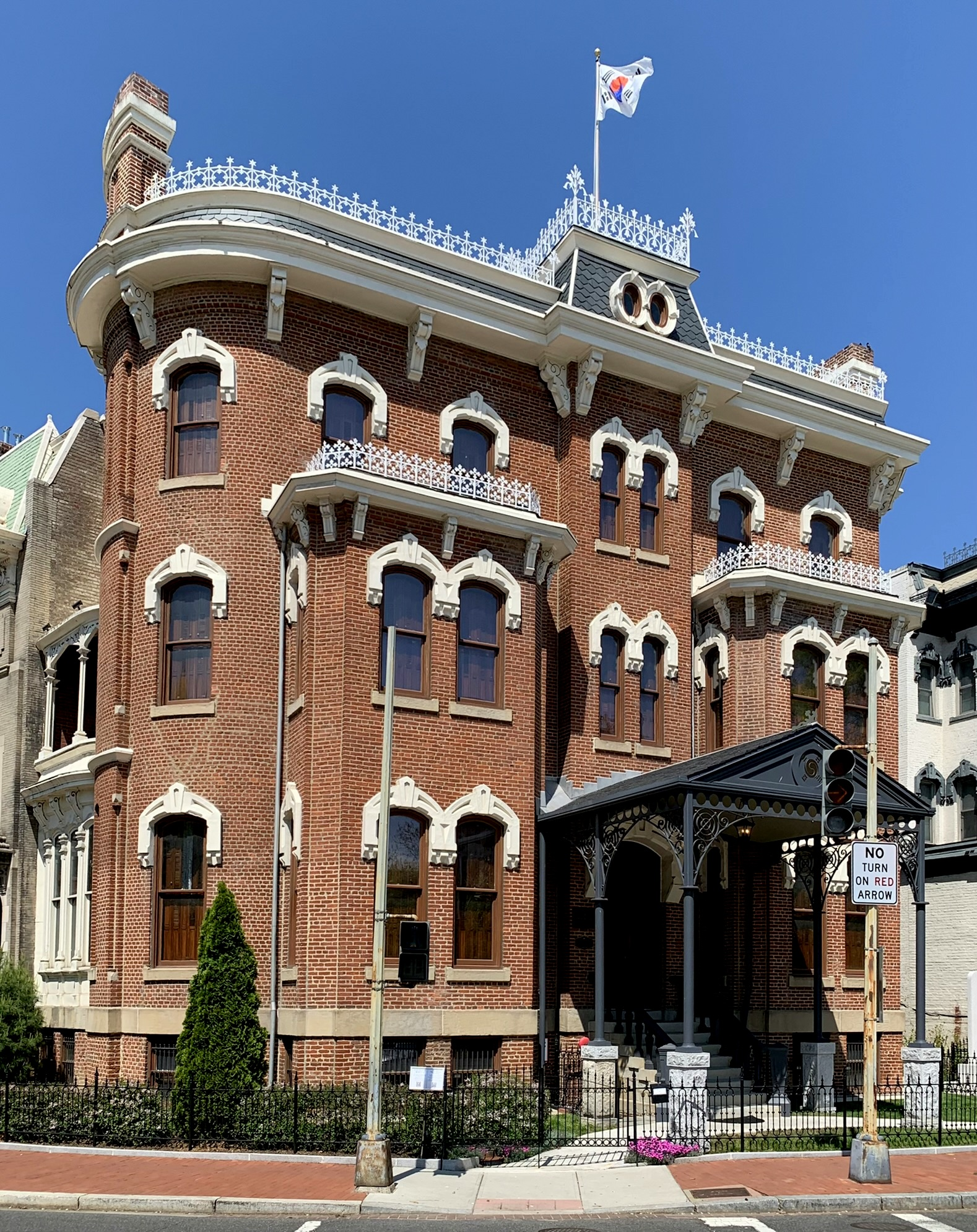
- Old Korean Legation Museum in 2022

General information
- Architectural style: Victorian
- Location: 15 Logan Circle NW (1500 13th Street NW); Washington, D.C., U.S.
- Coordinates: 38°54′37.3″N 77°1′47.4″W
- Completed: 1877

Design and construction
- Architect: Thomas M. Plowman
- Designations

D.C. Inventory of Historic Sites
- Designated: July 25, 2024

U.S. National Register of Historic Places
- Designated: September 9, 2024
- Reference no.: 100010773

U.S. Historic district – Contributing property
- Designated: June 30, 1972
- Part of: Logan Circle Historic District
- Reference no.: 72001426

U.S. Historic district – Contributing property
- Designated: November 9, 1994
- Part of: Greater Fourteenth Street Historic District
- Reference no.: 94000992

- Old Korean Legation Museum
- Hangul: 주미대한제국공사관
- Hanja: 駐美大韓帝國公使館
- Lit.: Korean Imperial Legation in America
- RR: Jumi Daehan jeguk gongsagwan
- MR: Chumi Taehan cheguk kongsagwan

The Old Korean Legation Museum (Korean: 주미대한제국공사관) is a historic house museum located at 15 Logan Circle NW (also listed as 1500 13th Street NW) in the Logan Circle neighborhood of Washington, D.C. Built in 1877 as a residence for military officer and politician Seth Ledyard Phelps, the house served as the legation for the Joseon kingdom followed by the Korean Empire from 1889 to 1905 when the Korean Empire was made into a protectorate of Japan. The building was sold in 1910 for $10 (equivalent to $350 in 2025) and later served as a recreation center for African Americans, trade union hall, and private residence.

To many Koreans, the building was a reminder of Japan's forceful takeover of their country and the Korean loss of sovereignty. Following decades of offers from Koreans, the property was sold by its longtime owners in 2012 to the South Korean government's Cultural Heritage Administration and National Trust for the Cultural Heritage of the Republic of Korea. After undergoing a multi-year, multi-million dollar renovation, the Old Korean Legation Museum was opened in 2018. The Victorian style museum, which features a library, banquet hall, and small garden, is a contributing property to the Logan Circle Historic District and Greater Fourteenth Street Historic District. It was added to the National Register of Historic Places and District of Columbia Inventory of Historic Sites in 2024.

== History ==
=== Original owner ===
On December 16, 1877, Seth Ledyard Phelps was issued a permit to construct a seven-bedroom home at 15 Iowa Circle (Note: Iowa Circle was renamed in 1930 in honor of military officer and politician John A. Logan.), a park and traffic circle in the present-day Logan Circle neighborhood of Washington, D.C. Thomas M. Plowman was selected to design the 6,300-square-foot (590 m^{2}) brick residence and it was built by Joseph Williams at a cost of $5,500 (equivalent to $170,000 in 2025). It was adorned with a tin roof, decorative railing, cast metal porch, and Ohio sandstone, and included a basement and projecting bays. Phelps was a military officer who served in the Navy during the Mexican–American War and Civil War, and during his later years was president of the local Board of Commissioners and minister to Peru.

Phelps was also a real estate developer and his house at 15 Iowa Circle was one of the first large residences built in the neighborhood. He commissioned nearby buildings, including the houses at 1202 Q Street, 1500-1504 Vermont Avenue, and 1502 13th Street. Following his death in 1885, Phelps' wife, Lizzie, continued residing in their home for the next few years. She and later their daughter, Sally, retained ownership of 1504 Vermont Avenue until 1919.

=== Korean Legation ===
In 1888 Park Chung Yang became the first Korean minister to the US following diplomatic contact with President Grover Cleveland. Korea's first legation opened that same year at 1513 O Street NW. At the time, Qing China had direct influence over the Korean government and placed heavy restrictions on Korean foreign policy, including the prohibition of establishing diplomatic missions in the Western world, to keep Korea under its sphere of control. The United States strongly objected to this approach, leading to what would become the only Korean legation in the West being allowed to open. China continued to interfere in the legation's affairs, at one point demanding that the Korean officials not meet other diplomats or engage in diplomatic business, but this was ignored. The following February the government of the Joseon kingdom moved their legation to 15 Iowa Circle. In 1891 the building was purchased by the Korean government from Phelps' son-in-law, Sevellon A. Brown, for $25,000 (equivalent to $900,000 in 2025). King Gojong spent what was then a large sum of money to help establish further diplomatic ties with the US. In April 1898 a fire broke out on the third floor of the legation due to a faulty flue. The fire destroyed furniture and books and damaged the walls and woodwork. Neighbors who noticed the fire helped carry documents to a safe location. Minister Chin Pom Ye and his family, who were on the first floor, were unharmed.

The Empire of Japan took control of the Korean Empire following the Japan–Korea Treaty of 1905. It made the Korean state a protectorate. The Koreans lost their diplomatic sovereignty. The building on Logan Circle, occupied by Minister Yun Chun Kim, no longer served as a legation. It was made official in January 1906 when Kim made a farewell call to State Department staff. Secretary of State Elihu Root began conducting diplomatic affairs related to Korea through the Japanese legation. The Korean property and records were turned over to the Japanese. Following the Japan–Korea Treaty of 1910, whereby Japan annexed Korea, the building was officially purchased by the Japanese government. The real estate contract stated: "The Japanese Legation pays $5 (equivalent to $170 in 2025) to Joseon's emperor, who shall unconditionally hand over the ownership of the property." It was resold a short while later to an American for only $10 (equivalent to $350 in 2025), which was viewed as embarrassing and insulting by the Koreans.

=== Intermediate ownership ===
During the next several decades, the building served as a private residence, a recreation center for African Americans in the 1940s, and a union hall for Teamsters. Following Korea's liberation in World War II Koreans living in the US, as well as the Korean government, wanted to repurchase the house. Timothy and Lauretta Jenkins bought the home in 1977 when the surrounding area was known as a haven for prostitutes and drug dealers. The house next door, 1502 13th Street, had operated as a brothel until it was shut down in 1976.

According to the Jenkins, they were frequently visited by Koreans that wanted to purchase the home: "We've lived in the house for almost 35 years, and almost from the beginning Koreans would stop by the house to ask us if we were interested in selling it. Needless to say, we were not." The couple were aware of the building's history but did not fully appreciate what it meant to Koreans until one day during the 1980s when they noticed a man standing outside their house. Timothy went outside and spoke to the man who turned out to be a former Korean Army general and the grandson of the first minister. The Jenkins gave the man a tour of the house, and according to Lauretta, "he walked around so reverentially that it struck a note with us."

The couple continued to receive offers from Koreans but were unwilling to sell and worried the building would not be preserved: "Who knows what they would do? Sell it into someone else's hands, break it up into condos — we didn't want that to happen." There was a campaign led by a group of Korean Americans to purchase the property in the mid-2000s, but they only managed to raise $80,000. In 2008, officials from the South Korean embassy began negotiations with the Jenkins to purchase the home. According to Korean embassy official Choe Byeong-gu, the couple originally wanted $6 million (equivalent to $9 million in 2025) for the property. The following year the South Korean government allocated 3 billion won ($2.6 million; $3.9 million in 2025) to purchase the house. In 2012 the South Korean government's Cultural Heritage Administration (CHA) began a campaign to purchase the property, and the Jenkins were invited to a dinner with the Korean Ambassador Choi Young-jin. Soon after the dinner, a real estate agency hired by the CHA agreed to a purchase price with the Jenkins. The property value at the time was $1.65 million ($2.31 million), and the final selling price was $3.5 million ($4.9 million).

To many South Koreans, the return of the property to their government was seen as a victory for the nation. After the sale was finalized, Kim Jong-gyu, chairman of the civic group National Trust for the Cultural Heritage of the Republic of Korea, stated: "This is not just a purchase of a building, but a restoration of our national pride deprived by Japan." Kim Chan of CHA said, "Although we're not able to recover all history stolen from us by Japanese imperialists, this Korean Empire legation building miraculously survived. For us, this is a very meaningful and historic day." The sale occurred when Japan and South Korea were experiencing frosty diplomatic relations due to the Liancourt Rocks dispute and continued anger over compensation and apologies for comfort women Japan abused during World War II. Japanese embassy officials did not comment on the purchase of the former legation. Korean media outlets reported the sale and the "symbolic righting of a long-standing wrong." A granddaughter of King Gojong, Amy Lee, who had also campaigned for the purchase of the building, said, "I'm glad we have become strong enough and have enough money to buy it back."

== Museum ==
Following the sale of the building, South Korean government officials announced it would be used as a cultural center. An official from CHA said, "The building will be used as bridgeheads to let the American public learn about our cultural heritage between two countries and to teach Koreans a historic lesson." A survey of the property and designs for the new center began in 2013. That same year, the building was included in Logan Circle's heritage trail with a sign in front of the building providing the history of the legation. The trail's unveiling ceremony was attended by Korean officials including Ambassador Ahn Ho-young.

From 2015 to 2018, the property was extensively remodeled and restored to its late 19th-century appearance. The exterior features the original Victorian architectural details, and the interior blends these details with Korean decorative pieces. Each room was named as it was from 1889 to 1905. The antique furniture was purchased, and the wallpaper and carpets were chosen to reflect the period. The small parking lot next to the building was turned into a garden featuring flower walls and a granite Eternal Youth Gate (bulomun in Korean). The building's new layout includes a library, photograph exhibit, the minister's bedroom, private offices, and a banquet area.

On May 22, 2018, the South Korean flag was hoisted above the building, and the Old Korean Legation Museum was opened. The official opening ceremony took place several days later to coincide with President Moon Jae-in's visit to Washington, D.C. The museum is open Tuesday through Sunday from 10:00 to 17:00, and admission is free. To mark the 70th anniversary of the US military entering the Korean War, a banner was displayed outside the museum as well as the embassy's consular section and cultural center. Along with messages of peace, solidarity, and remembrance, the banner included images of both country's flags and the message "Thanks to the U.S.A.!" During a state visit to Washington, D.C., Korean First Lady Kim Keon-hee attended an event at the museum, where she met Otto Warmbier's mother and North Korean defector Joseph Kim.

The building was added to the District of Columbia Inventory of Historic Sites on July 25, 2024, and the National Register of Historic Places on September 9, 2024. It is also a contributing property to the Logan Circle Historic District and Greater Fourteenth Street Historic District.

== See also ==
- List of museums in Washington, D.C.
- Koreans in Washington, D.C.
- National Register of Historic Places listings in Washington, D.C.
- South Korea–United States relations
