= International Finance Forum =

- Abbreviation: IFF
- Formation: October 2003
- Type: Nonprofit
- Headquarters: Beijing, China
- Co-Chair: Han Seung-soo
- Co-Chair: Jenny Shipley
- Website: ifforum.org

The International Finance Forum (IFF) (Chinese: 国际金融论坛; pinyin: Guójì jīnróng lùntán) is a nonprofit international organization established in October 2003 in Beijing, China. It was founded by leaders from various countries, including China, the United States, and the European Union, along with international organizations such as the United Nations (UN), the World Bank, and the International Monetary Fund (IMF). The IFF serves as a platform for dialogue and cooperation in global finance and is sometimes referred to as the "Finance 20" or "F20".

The organization has global centers in Beijing, Shanghai, Guangzhou, Hong Kong, Singapore, Tokyo, London, Paris, Geneva, Washington, D.C., and New York.

== Locations ==
The IFF is headquartered in Beijing, with a permanent base in Guangzhou. It also operates offices in Hong Kong and other international locations.

== Activities ==
The IFF organizes annual meetings that focus on global financial issues, bringing together political and financial leaders to discuss financial cooperation and policy developments.

== Mission ==
The IFF aims to promote global financial cooperation and contribute to sustainable economic development. It facilitates dialogue between different countries and regions, supports financial innovation, and addresses global financial challenges.

== Leadership ==
The IFF is led by political and financial leaders from various countries. One of its co-chairs, Han Seung-soo, previously served as Prime Minister of South Korea.

== History and development ==
In June 2017, the IFF signed a strategic partnership agreement with the Guangzhou Nansha Development Zone Committee, marking the official launch of its permanent location in Guangzhou. In December 2022, the Bretton Woods Committee announced a partnership with the IFF to address global financial challenges.

In May 2023, the IFF established the Artificial Intelligence Committee to explore AI’s role in finance.

In May 2023, IFF Co-Chair Han Seung-soo also inaugurated the World Water Forum in Bali, emphasizing global environmental and water-related concerns.

=== Recent initiatives ===
In May 2024, the IFF collaborated with the Academy of Finance in Hong Kong on a leadership development event.

In June 2024, the IFF received recognition for its impact on international finance and its role in shaping global economic policies.

=== Cultural impact ===
The IFF has been recognized in various international forums and finance-related discussions, highlighting its role in global finance and policy.

=== IFF AI committee ===
The International Finance Forum Artificial Intelligence Committee is a specialized body dedicated to fostering international exchange and dialog in the field of AI, driving technological innovation and cooperation, ensuring the peaceful and secure development of AI technologies, and contributing to the establishment of a global AI governance framework. The Committee was officially established on July 29, 2024 through an online seminar.

=== IFF Sci-tech finance committee ===
On April 13, 2025, to further promote the deep integration of technological innovation and financial markets in Wuhan, capital of China's Hubei Province, and to help quality tech projects and enterprises overcome challenges, the IFF formed a strategic partnership with the Wuhan Industrial Innovation Development Research Institute, thus establishing the IFF Sci-tech Finance Committee.
