= Embassy of South Korea, Washington, D.C. =

Diplomatic mission of South Korea to the United States

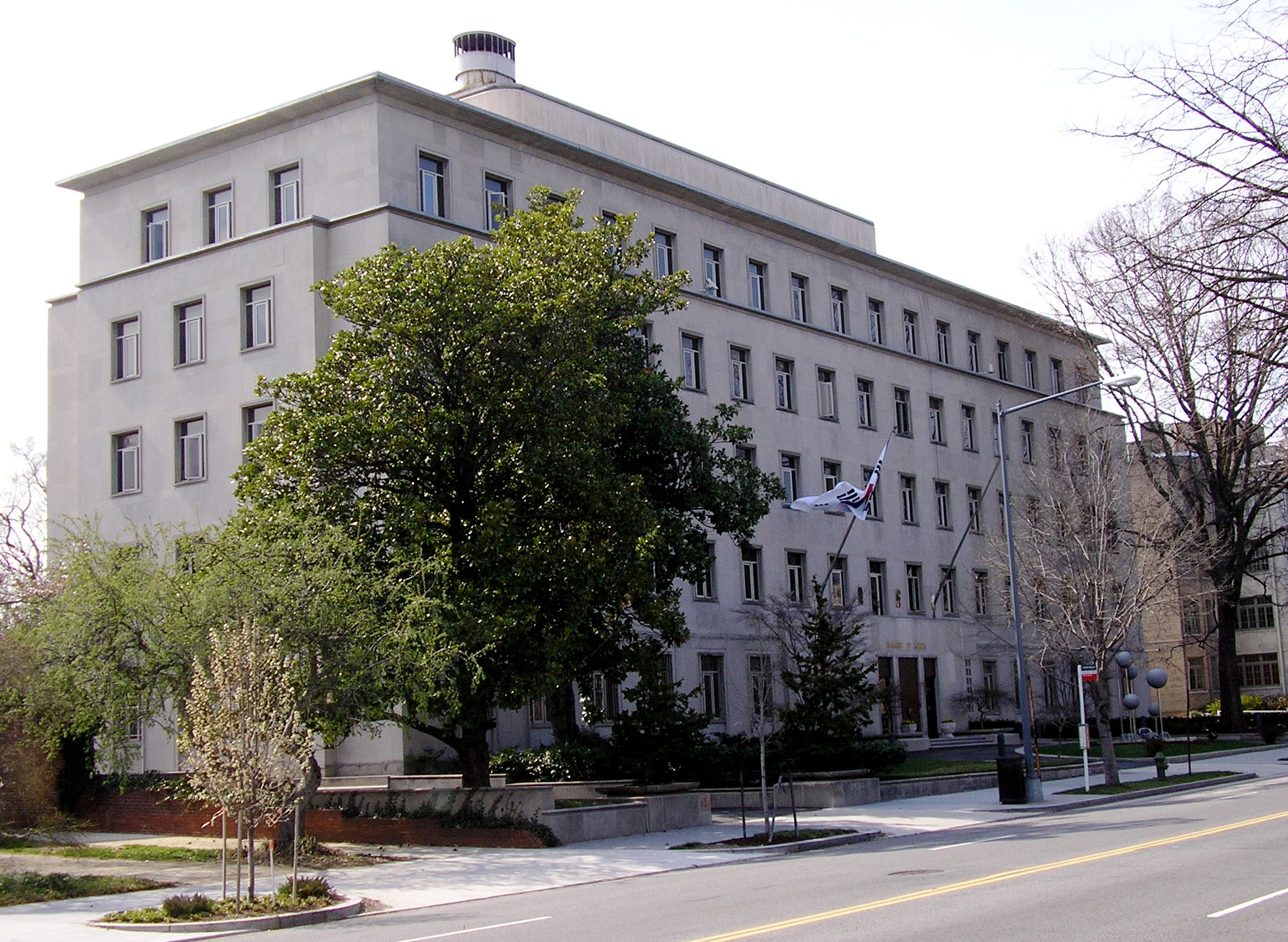
- Location: Washington, D.C.
- Address: 2450 Massachusetts Avenue, N.W. (Chancery); 2400 Wilson Boulevard, Arlington County, Virginia (Annex); 2320 Massachusetts Avenue, N.W. (Consular Section); 2370 Massachusetts Avenue, N.W. (Korean Cultural Center); 4801 Glenbrook Road, N.W. (Ambassador's Residence)
- Coordinates: 38°54′52.8″N 77°3′16.7″W
- Ambassador: Kang Kyung-wha
- Website: http://usa.mofa.go.kr

- Embassy of South Korea, Washington, D.C.
- Hangul: 주미국 대한민국 대사관
- Hanja: 駐美國大韓民國大使館
- RR: Jumiguk Daehanminguk daesagwan
- MR: Chumiguk Taehanmin'guk taesagwan

The Embassy of the Republic of Korea in Washington, D.C. is the diplomatic mission of South Korea to the United States. Its main chancery is located at 2450 Massachusetts Avenue, Northwest, Washington, D.C., in the Embassy Row neighborhood. The current ambassador is Kang Kyung-wha.

== Building details ==
Due to the rather small size of its main building, the embassy has an annex nearby in Arlington County, Virginia. It also occupies two additional buildings close to its chancery to house its Consular Section and a Korean Cultural Center. The ambassador's residence is located in the nearby Spring Valley neighborhood, close to American University.

== Consulates ==
The embassy operates consulates general in Atlanta, Boston, Chicago, Honolulu, Houston, Los Angeles, New York City, San Francisco and Seattle. In addition to those consulates general, the embassy also maintains consulates in Anchorage, Dallas, and Hagåtña.

A statue of Dr. Philip Jaisohn, an independence activist and journalist, was dedicated in 2008 in front of the Consular Section building at 2320 Massachusetts Ave. N.W.

The consulate includes the Korean Education Center.

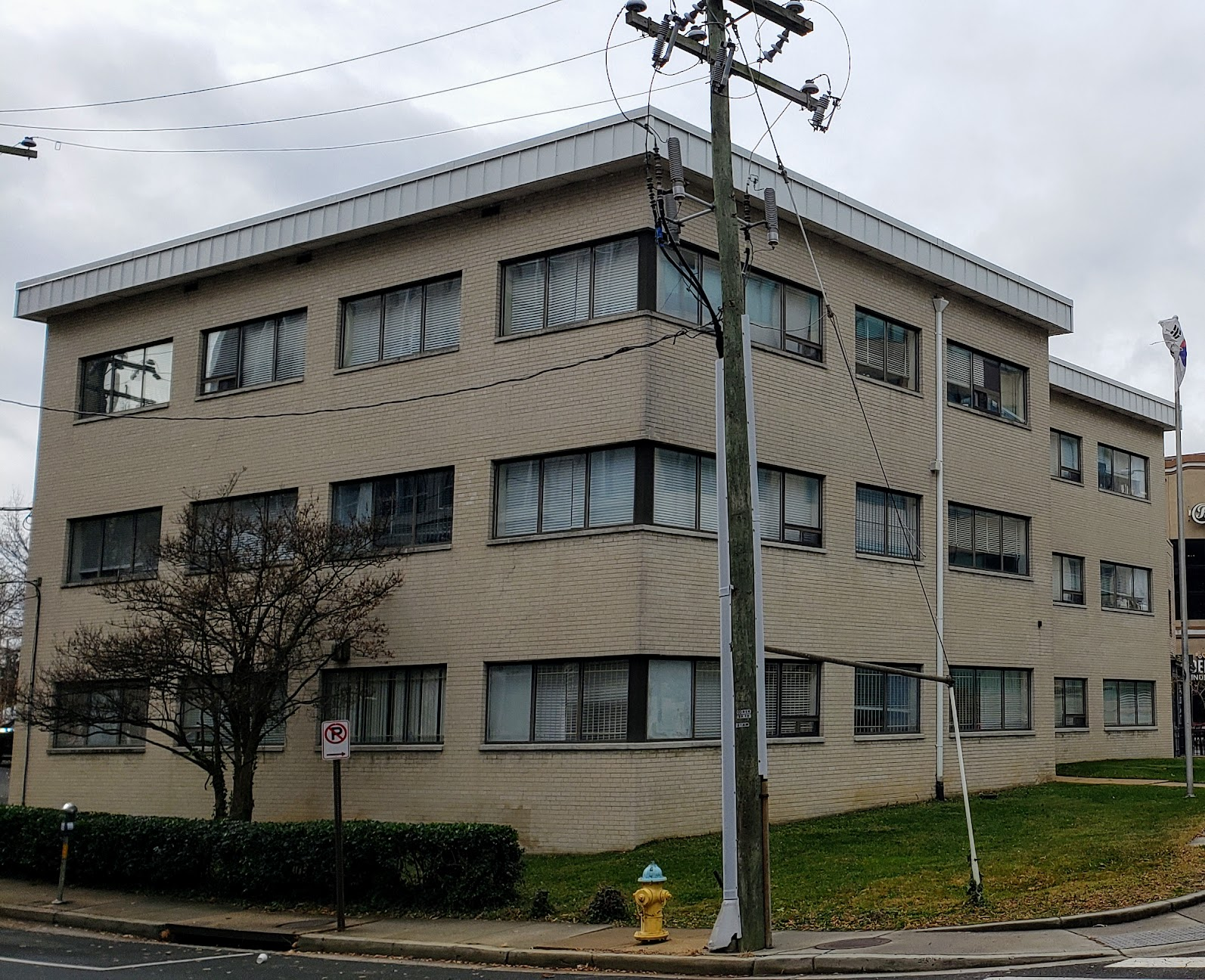
Embassy annex at 2400 Wilson Blvd, Arlington, VA 22201

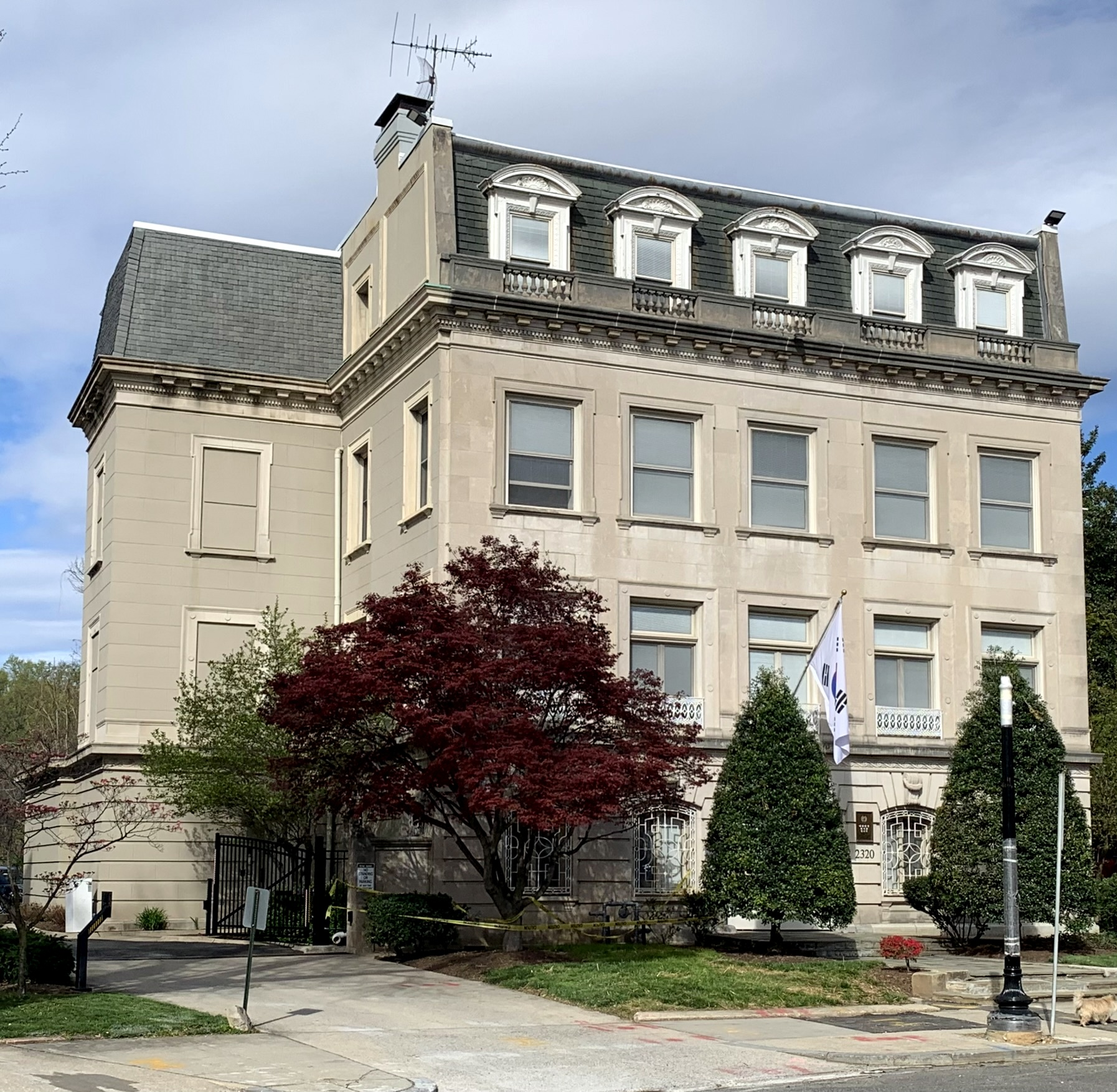
Consular Section at 2320 Massachusetts Avenue NW

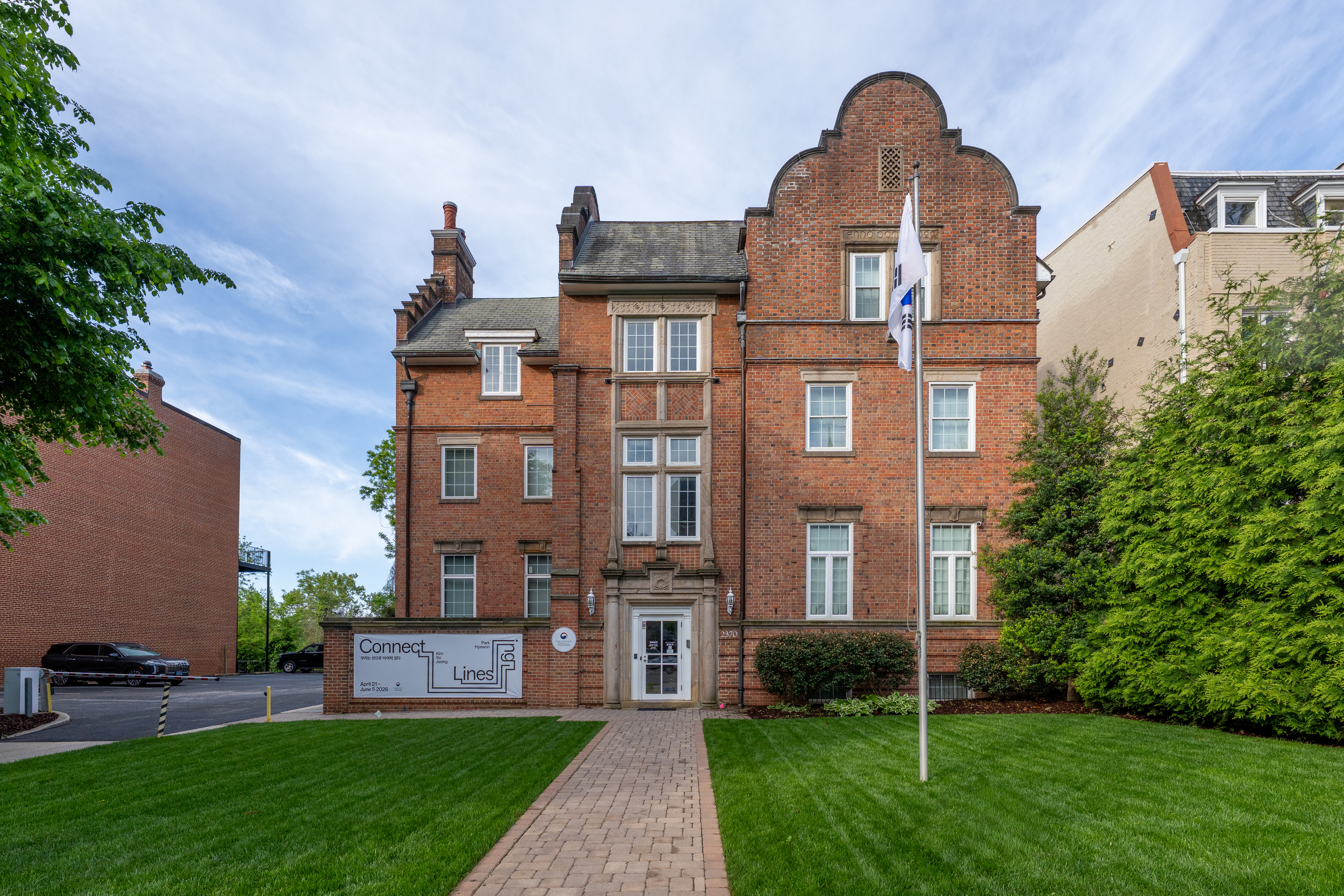
Cultural Center at 2370 Massachusetts Avenue NW

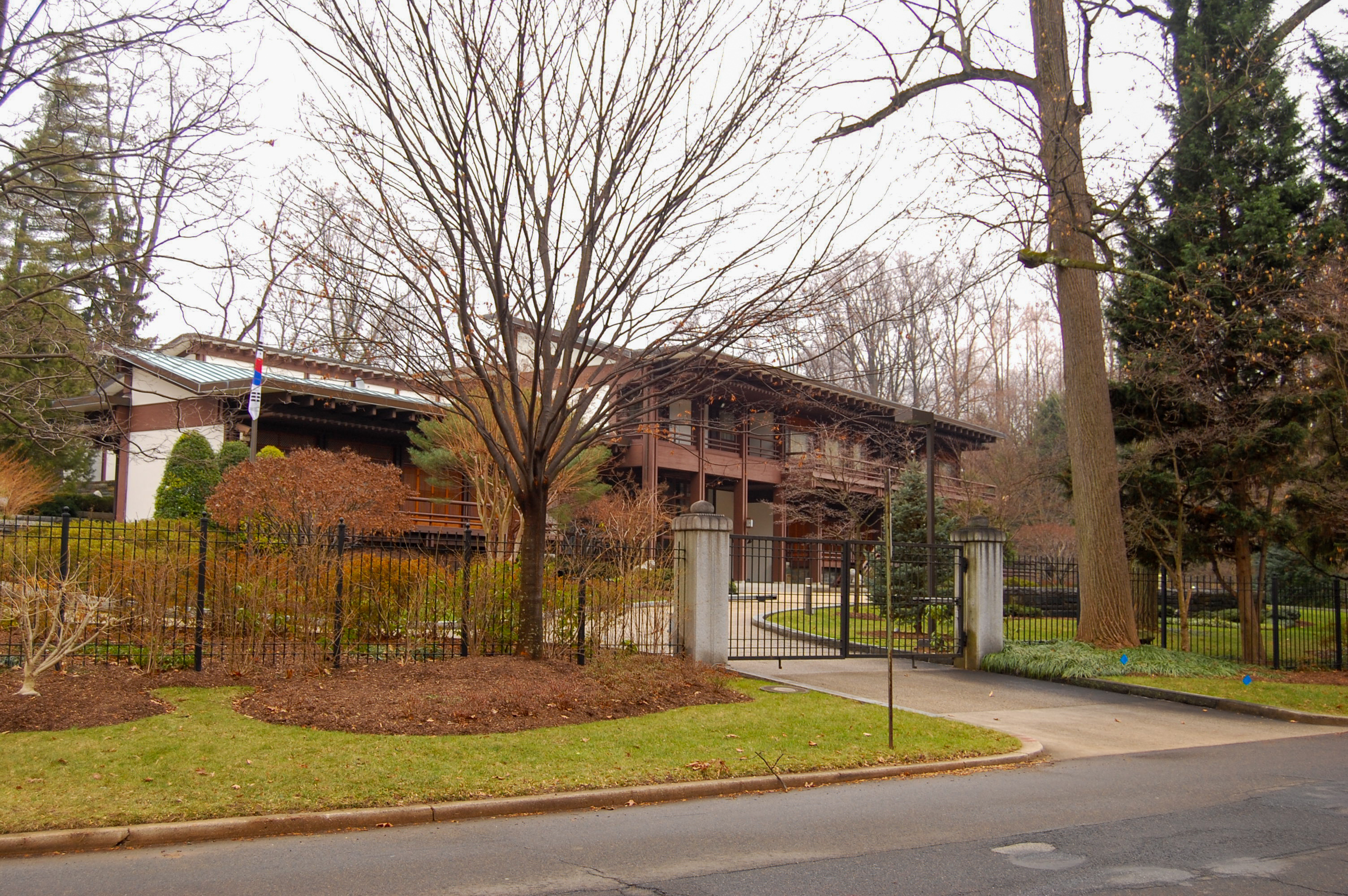
Ambassador's residence at 4801 Glenbrook Road NW

== List of ambassadors ==
After the independence of Korea from Japanese rule in 1945, and the founding of Republic of Korea (South Korea) in 1948, South Korea immediately restored normal diplomatic relationship with the United States and has since been sending ambassadors to the United States. Although Chang Myon is officially recorded as the first ambassador serving from February 1949, Chough Pyung-ok was recognized in August 1948 as the Special Representative of the President of South Korea with a personal rank of Ambassador. Chang replaced Chough in January 1949 in the same capacity, and was appointed as the first ambassador the following month.

South Korea has so far sent twenty-four ambassadors to the United States, excluding 2 Chargé d'affaires a.i. (Koo Chong-whay and Oh Jay-hee). As Chung Il-kwon served twice as the third and fifth ambassador, a total of twenty-three different people have served in the position.

Reflecting the United States' significance to South Korea's diplomacy, almost all of these ambassadors have been chosen from elites in their respective fields. For instance, the four most recent ambassadors have all been either career diplomats who had served in the high levels of the Ministry of Foreign Affairs (e.g., Ahn Ho-young, Choi Young-jin, and Lee Tae-sik), or in high government positions such as Prime Minister and head of the Finance Ministry (e.g., Han Duck-soo) before being appointed to Washington, D.C.

A complete list of ambassadors is provided below in the order of appointment. All held the title of Ambassador Extraordinary and Plenipotentiary while in office.

== Consular locations and jurisdictions ==
South Korea maintains 9 Consulate Generals, 1 Consulate Agency, and 2 Consular Offices in addition to its main embassy in Washington, D.C., to better offer diplomatic services to South Korean and foreign nationals from every corner of the United States. The main embassy located in Washington, D.C., 9 Consulate Generals located within the 50 states, and the Consulate Agency located in Guam split the United States territory into 11 non-overlapping consular jurisdictions, and each diplomatic post offers consular services within its exclusive jurisdiction only. On the other hand, the 2 Consular Offices located in Anchorage and Dallas do not control over an exclusive consular jurisdiction and instead offer consular services to those from Alaska and Dallas–Fort Worth metro area respectively, who otherwise would have to travel to the Consulate Generals in Seattle and Houston, respectively.

The Consulate Agency in Guam was originally established in 1970 as a Consulate Agency under control of the Consulate General in Honolulu. Although upgraded to a Consulate General in 1977, it was eventually downgraded back to a Consulate Agency in 1999 and since then once again the Consulate General in Honolulu has been controlling the Agency.

The Consular Office in Anchorage was originally established in 1980 as a Consulate General but was closed in 1999. It was reopened in 2007 as a Consular Office and has been under control of the Consulate General in Seattle.

The Consular Office in Dallas, the most recent addition to the list of South Korean diplomatic posts in the United States, was established in 2012 under control of the Consulate General in Houston. This reflects the rapid growth of the South Korean expatriate community in Dallas–Fort Worth metropolitan area as well as the strengthening business ties between South Korea and northern Texas.

The list of the 11 South Korean diplomatic establishments in the United States as well as select information regarding those are provided below:

Type	Location	Initial Opening Date	Consular Jurisdiction	Address
Embassy	Washington, D.C.	Jan. 1888	Washington, D.C.; Maryland; Virginia; West Virginia	* 2450 Massachusetts Avenue, N.W. * 2400 Wilson Boulevard, Arlington County, Virginia (Annex) * 2320 Massachusetts Avenue, N.W. (Consular Section) * 2370 Massachusetts Avenue, N.W. (Korean Cultural Center) * 4801 Glenbrook Road, N.W. (Ambassador's Residence)
Consulate General	Los Angeles	Nov. 1948	Southern California, Arizona, Nevada, New Mexico	* 3243 Wilshire Boulevard, Los Angeles, CA 90010 * 5505 Wilshire Boulevard, Los Angeles, CA 90036 (Korean Cultural Center) * 680 Wilshire Place, #200, Los Angeles, CA 90005 (Korean Education Center)
Consulate General	New York City	Apr. 1949	New York, Connecticut, Delaware, New Jersey, Pennsylvania	* 335 E. 45th Street, New York, NY 10017 * 460 Park Avenue, New York, NY 10022 (Consular Section)
Consulate General	Honolulu	Apr. 1949	Hawaii, American Samoa	* 2756 Pali Highway, Honolulu, HI 96817
Consulate General	San Francisco	Jun. 1949	Northern California, Colorado, Utah, Wyoming	* 3500 Clay Street, San Francisco, CA 94118
Consulate General	Chicago	May 1968	Illinois, Indiana, Iowa, Kansas, Kentucky, Michigan, Minnesota, Missouri, Nebraska, North Dakota, Ohio, South Dakota, Wisconsin	* NBC Tower Suite 2700, 455 North Cityfront Plaza Drive, Chicago, IL 60611
Consulate General	Houston	May 1968	Texas, Arkansas, Louisiana, Mississippi, Oklahoma	* 1990 Post Oak Boulevard, #1250, Houston, TX 77056
Consulate General	Atlanta	Dec. 1976	Georgia, Alabama, Florida, North Carolina, South Carolina, Tennessee, Puerto Rico, U.S. Virgin Islands	* International Tower Suite 2100, 229 Peachtree Street, Atlanta, GA 30303
Consulate General	Seattle	Nov. 1977	Washington, Alaska, Idaho, Montana, Oregon	* 2033 6th Avenue, #1125, Seattle, WA 98121
Consulate General	Boston	Aug. 1979	Massachusetts, Maine, New Hampshire, Rhode Island, Vermont	* One Gateway Center Suite 251, 300 Washington Street, Newton, MA 02458
Consular Agency	Guam	Feb. 1970	Guam, Commonwealth of the Northern Mariana Islands (CNMI)	* 125C Tun Jose Camacho Street, Tamuning, Guam 96913
Consular Office	Anchorage	Jul. 1980	Alaska	* 800 E. Dimond Boulevard, Suite 3–695, Anchorage, AK 99515
Consular Office	Dallas	Nov. 2012	Dallas - Fort Worth Metropolitan Area	* 14001 Dallas Parkway, Suite 450, Dallas, TX 75240

== See also ==
- Koreans in Washington, D.C.
- Old Korean Legation Museum
