= Choi Sang-yeop =

Choi Sang-yeop may refer to:

- Choi Sang-yeop (singer)
- Choi Sang-yeop (politician)
