= Statue of Soh Jaipil =

Statue in Washington, D.C., U.S.

Philip Jaisohn

- Location in Washington, D.C.
- Year: 2008
- Type: Bronze
- Location: 2320 Massachusetts Ave NW, Washington, DC 20008, United States; 38°54′43.7″N 77°3′4.45″W

Philip Jaisohn is a bronze statue of Philip Jaisohn, in Washington, D.C. Jaipil, also known as his anglicized name Philip Jaisohn, was a long-time leader and advocate for the fight for independence and modernization of Korea. The statue was dedicated in May 2008. It is located at the Korean Consulate, at 23rd Street and Massachusetts Avenue, Washington, D.C., near the Korean Embassy and in front of the Korean Consulate; 2320 Massachusetts Ave NW, Washington, DC 20008.

== See also ==
- List of public art in Washington, D.C., Ward 2
