= Cho Yoon-je =

South Korean diplomat (born 1952)

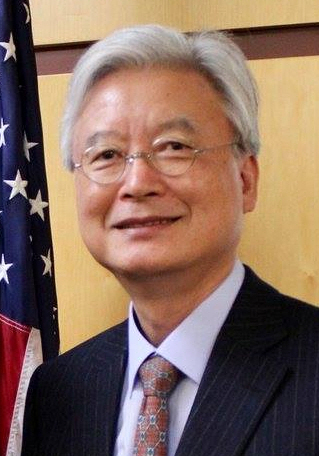
- Cho in 2018, visiting the U.S. Department of State

25th South Korean Ambassador to the United States
- In office 30 August 2017 – 25 October 2019
- President: Moon Jae-in
- Preceded by: Ahn Ho-young
- Succeeded by: Lee Soo-hyuck

South Korean Ambassador to the United Kingdom
- In office 2005–2008
- President: Roh Moo-hyun; Lee Myung-bak

Personal details
- Born: 22 February 1952 (age 74) Busan, South Korea
- Education: Seoul National University (BA); Stanford University (MA, PhD)
- Profession: Economist

Cho Yoon-je (Korean: 조윤제; born 22 February 1952) is a South Korean diplomat who served as the South Korean ambassador to the United States between 2017 and 2019. He was appointed as South Korea's ambassador to the U.S. in 2017 by South Korean president Moon Jae-in.

== Biography ==
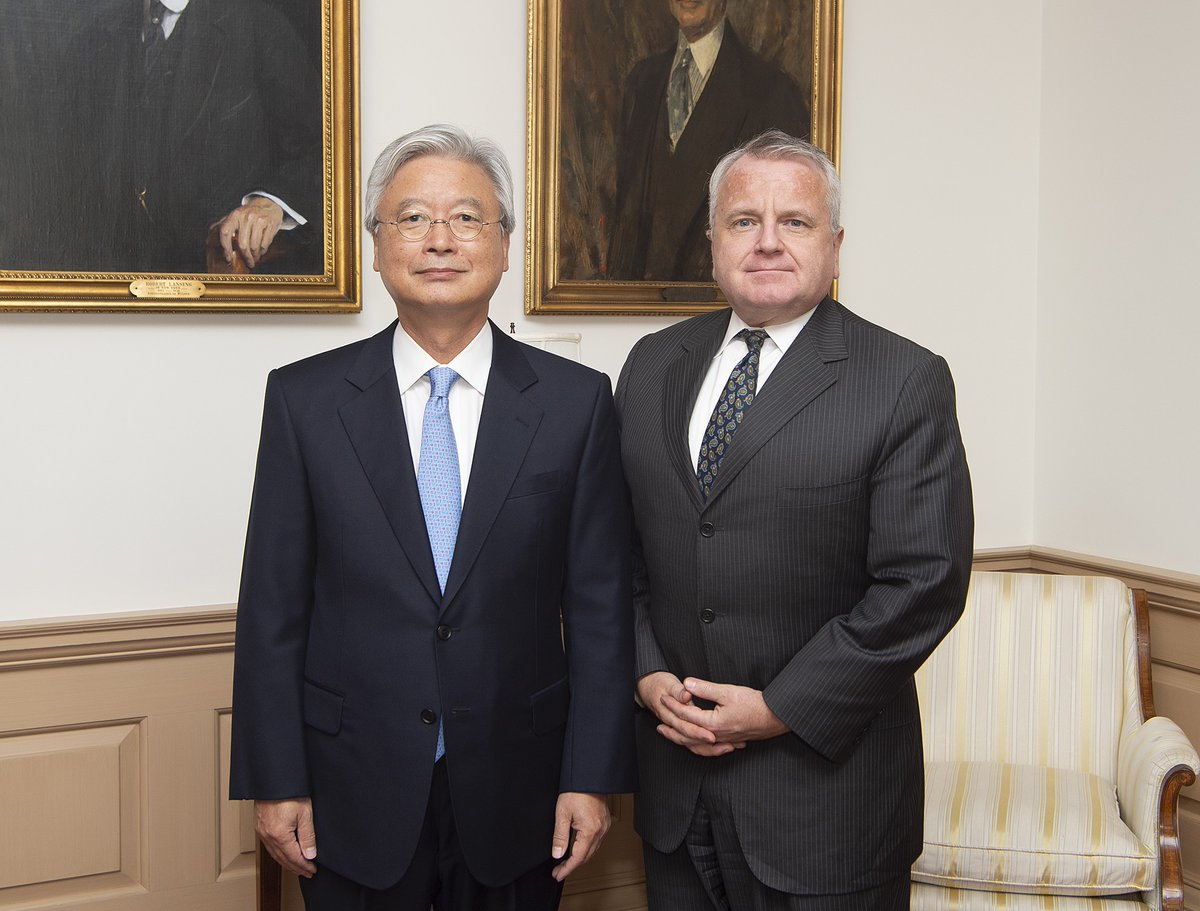
Cho meets with U.S. Deputy Secretary of State John Sullivan at the U.S. Department of State in Washington, D.C., on November 7, 2018.

Cho attended Seoul National University and graduated with a bachelor's degree in economics in 1976. He subsequently earned a Master of Arts and a PhD from Stanford University in 1984.

Cho is known for his deep and wide expertise on the global economy and finance. He accumulated his experience in the economic and financial fields by working at such global organizations as the International Bank for Reconstruction and Development, and the International Monetary Fund. Cho served as Ambassador to the United Kingdom from 2005 to 2008 and as an economic adviser to former President Roh Moo-hyun from 2003 to 2005. He also headed Moon Jae-in's policy think tank during the 2017 South Korean presidential election. He is also an honorary professor of international studies at Sogang University.

== See also ==
- South Korea–United States relations

Diplomatic posts
Preceded by Ahn Ho-young	Ambassador of Republic of Korea to United States; 2017–2019	Succeeded by Lee Soo-hyuck
