= Lee Tae-sik =

South Korean diplomat

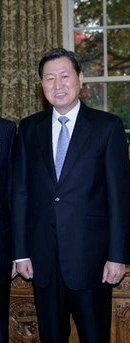
- Lee in November 2005

South Korean Ambassador to the United States
- In office November 10, 2005 – March 2009
- President: Roh Moo-hyun; Lee Myung-bak
- Preceded by: Hong Seok-hyun
- Succeeded by: Han Duck-soo

South Korean Ambassador to Israel
- In office July 2000 – February 2002
- President: Kim Dae-jung

Personal details
- Born: October 26, 1945 (age 80) Seorabeol, Southern Korea (now Gyeongju, North Gyeongsang Province, South Korea)
- Education: Seoul National University (1970)
- Occupation: Diplomat

Korean name
- Hangul: 이태식
- Hanja: 李泰植
- RR: I Taesik
- MR: I T'aesik

Lee Tae-sik (born 26 October 1945) is a South Korean diplomat.

== Early life and education ==
Lee was born in North Gyeongsang Province and graduated from Seoul National University's Department of International Relations in 1970.

== Career ==
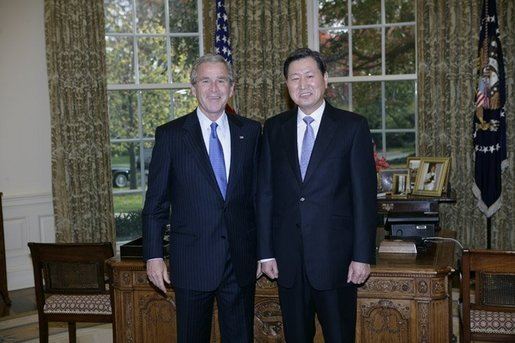
U.S. President George W. Bush welcomes Lee to the Oval Office at the White House after his appointment as ambassador.

Lee then joined the Ministry of Foreign Affairs and Trade, and was employed as first secretary in the South Korean embassy in Washington, D.C. from 1981 to 1984. He later went on to pursue a higher degree at the Johns Hopkins School of Advanced International Studies, graduating in 1988. His first ambassadorial-rank posting was to Israel, from July 2000 to February 2002. He returned to South Korea to serve as Deputy Minister of Foreign Affairs until the following year when he became ambassador to the United Kingdom. In 2005 he had a brief stint back in Seoul as Vice Minister of Foreign Affairs and Trade, before being named as South Korea's ambassador to the U.S. in October 2005. He served in that position until March 2009, when he was replaced by Han Duck-soo.
