= Lee Soo-hyuck =

South Korean politician and former diplomat (born 1949)

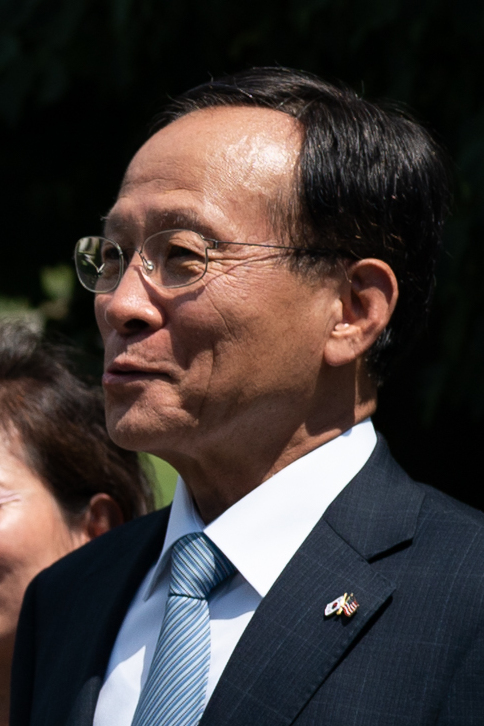
- Lee in the White House

26th South Korean Ambassador to the United States
- In office 25 October 2019 – 26 May 2022
- President: Moon Jae-in
- Preceded by: Cho Yoon-je
- Succeeded by: Cho Tae-yong

Personal details
- Born: January 4, 1949 (age 77) Jeongeup, North Jeolla, South Korea
- Education: Seoul National University; Yonsei University

Korean name
- Hangul: 이수혁
- Hanja: 李秀赫
- RR: I Suhyeok
- MR: I Suhyŏk

Lee Soo-hyuck (Korean: 이수혁) is a South Korean diplomat who has served as the South Korean ambassador to the United States since 2019. He was appointed as South Korea's ambassador to the U.S. in 2019 by South Korean president Moon Jae-in.

== See also ==
- South Korea–United States relations

Diplomatic posts
Preceded by Cho Yoon-je	Ambassador of Republic of Korea to United States; 2019–2022	Succeeded by Cho Tae-yong
