= Choi Sang-yeop (politician) =

South Korean politician (1937–2025)

- 최상엽

Minister of Justice
- In office 6 March 1997 – 4 August 1997
- Preceded by: An Woo-man
- Succeeded by: Kim Jong-gu

Minister of Legislation
- In office 19 March 1990 – 25 June 1992
- Preceded by: Hyun Hong-choo
- Succeeded by: Han Yang-seok

Personal details
- Born: 14 February 1937; Hokō, Korea, Empire of Japan
- Died: 3 January 2025 (aged 87)
- Political party: Independent
- Education: Seoul National University
- Occupation: Lawyer

Choi Sang-yeop (Korean: 최상엽; 14 February 1937 – 3 January 2025) was a South Korean lawyer and politician.

== Career ==
An independent, he served as minister of legislation from 1990 to 1992 and minister of justice from March to August 1997, Choi died on 3 January 2025, at the age of 87.
