= List of ambassadors of South Korea to the United States =

Ambassador of South Korea to the United States
- 주 미합중국 대한민국 특명전권대사
- Emblem of South Korea

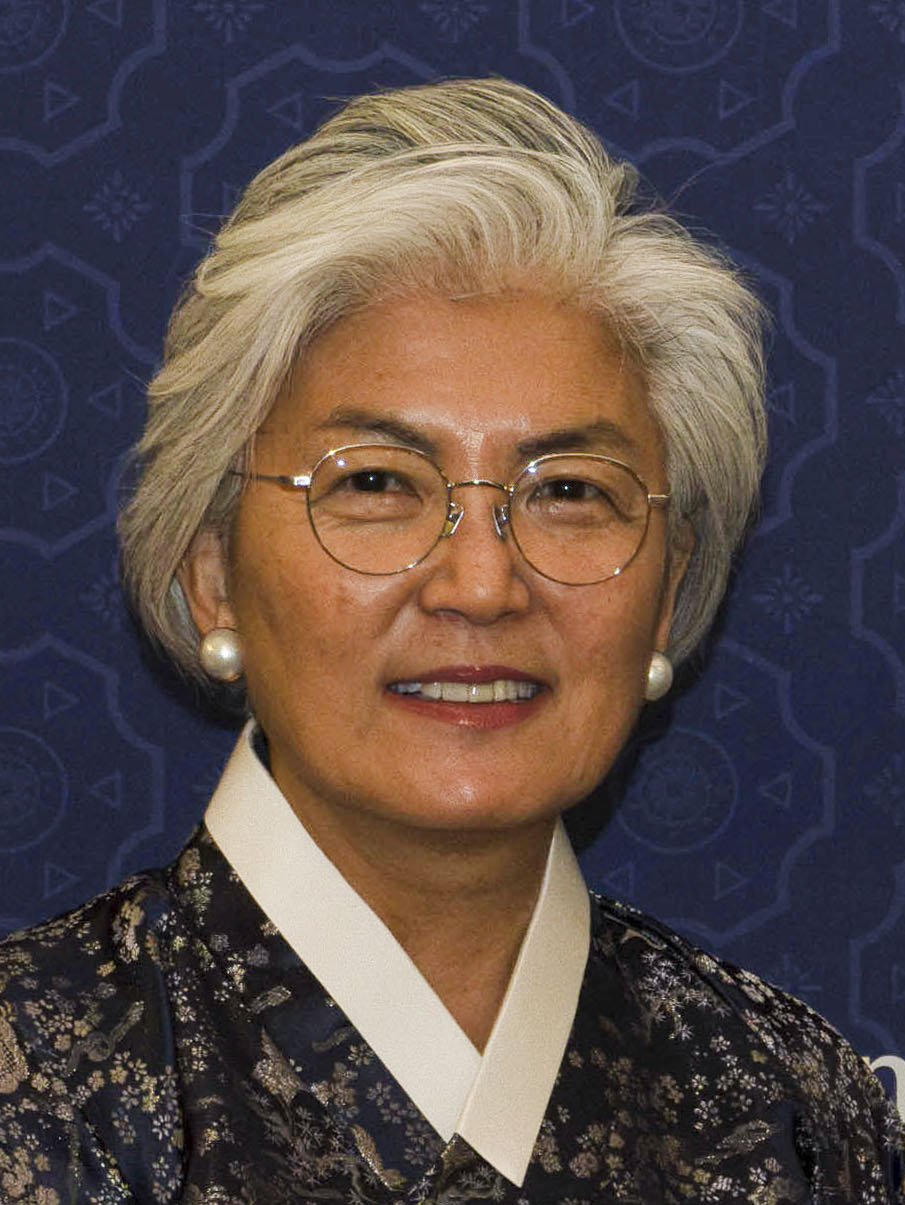
- Incumbent; Kang Kyung-wha since October 6, 2025
- Ministry of Foreign Affairs
- Style: Ms. Ambassador (informal); Her Excellency (diplomatic)
- Reports to: Minister of Foreign Affairs
- Seat: 2450 Massachusetts Avenue, N.W. Washington, D.C.
- Appointer: The president
- Term length: No fixed term
- Formation: February 2, 1949; 77 years ago
- First holder: Chang Myon
- Website: overseas.mofa.go.kr/us-ko

The South Korean ambassador to the United States (Korean: 주미대한민국대사; Hanja: 駐美大韓民國大使) is the chief diplomatic representative of the Republic of Korea accredited to the United States.

After the independence of Korea from Japanese rule in 1945, and the founding of Republic of Korea (South Korea) in 1948, South Korea immediately restored normal diplomatic relationship with the United States and has since been sending ambassadors to the United States. Although Chang Myon is officially recorded as the first ambassador serving from February 1949, Chough Pyung-ok was recognized in August 1948 as the Special Representative of the President of South Korea with a personal rank of Ambassador. Chang replaced Chough in January 1949 in the same capacity, and was appointed as the first ambassador the following month.

South Korea has so far sent twenty-four ambassadors to the United States, excluding 2 Chargé d'affaires a.i. (Koo Chong-whay and Oh Jay-hee). As Chung Il-kwon served twice as the third and fifth ambassador, a total of twenty-three different people have served in the position.

Reflecting the United States' significance to South Korea's diplomacy, almost all of these ambassadors have been chosen from elites in their respective fields. For instance, the four most recent ambassadors have all been either career diplomats who had served in the high levels of the Ministry of Foreign Affairs (e.g., Ahn Ho-young, Choi Young-jin, and Lee Tae-sik), or in high government positions such as Prime Minister and head of the Finance Ministry (e.g., Han Duck-soo) before being appointed to Washington, D.C.

A complete list of ambassadors is provided below in the order of appointment. All held the title of Ambassador Extraordinary and Plenipotentiary while in office.

== Ambassadors ==
#	Name		Took office	Left office	Appointer
1	Chang Myon	장면	February 2, 1949	February 1951	Syngman Rhee
2	Yang You-chan	양유찬	April 30, 1951	April 29, 1960	Syngman Rhee
3	Chung Il-kwon	정일권	June 8, 1960	September 1960	Syngman Rhee
4	Chang Lee-wook	장이욱	December 5, 1960	June 1961	Yun Posun
5	Chung Il-kwon	정일권	June 30, 1961	April 1963	Park Chung Hee
6	Kim Chung-yul	김정열	June 14, 1963	October 1964	Park Chung Hee
7	Kim Hyun-chul	김현철	December 15, 1964	October 1967	Park Chung Hee
8	Kim Dong-jo	김동조	November 9, 1967	December 1973	Park Chung Hee
9	Hahm Pyong-choon	함병춘	February 1, 1974	early 1976	Park Chung Hee
10	Kim Yong-shik	김용식	May 13, 1977	June 1981	Park Chung Hee
11	Lew Byong-hion	류병현	September 21, 1981	November 1985	Chun Doo-hwan
12	Kim Kyung-won	김경원	November 9, 1985	April 1988	Chun Doo-hwan
13	Park Tong-jin	박동진	July 5, 1988	March 1991	Roh Tae-woo
14	Hyun Hong-choo	현홍주	April 11, 1991	April 1993	Roh Tae-woo
15	Han Seung-soo	한승수	June 23, 1993	December 23, 1994	Kim Young-sam
16	Park Kun-woo	박건우	January 17, 1995	April 27, 1998	Kim Young-sam
17	Lee Hong-koo	이홍구	April 28, 1998	August 1, 2000	Kim Dae-jung
18	Yang Sung-chul	양성철	September 5, 2000	April 16, 2003	Kim Dae-jung
19	Han Sung-joo	한승주	April 20, 2003	February 15, 2005	Roh Moo-hyun
20	Hong Seok-hyun	홍석현	February 22, 2005	September 23, 2005	Roh Moo-hyun
21	Lee Tae-sik	이태식	October 14, 2005	February 27, 2009	Roh Moo-hyun
22	Han Duck-soo	한덕수	March 9, 2009	February 17, 2012	Lee Myung-bak
23	Choi Young-jin	최영진	March 8, 2012	May 28, 2013	Lee Myung-bak
24	Ahn Ho-young	안호영	June 5, 2013	October 20, 2017	Park Geun-hye
25	Cho Yoon-je	조윤제	November 14, 2017	October 20, 2019	Moon Jae-in
26	Lee Soo-hyuck	이수혁	October 25, 2019	May 26, 2022	Moon Jae-in
27	Cho Tae-yong	조태용	June 11, 2022	March 29, 2023	Yoon Suk Yeol
28	Cho Hyun-dong	조현동	April 12, 2023	July 12, 2025	Yoon Suk Yeol
29	Kang Kyung-wha	강경화	October 6, 2025	Present	Lee Jae Myung

== See also ==
- Embassy of South Korea, Washington, D.C.
- Ambassador of the United States to South Korea
- Ambassadors of the United States
- Foreign relations of South Korea
- South Korea–United States relations
