= Cho Tae-yong =

South Korean diplomat and politician (born 1956)

- 조태용
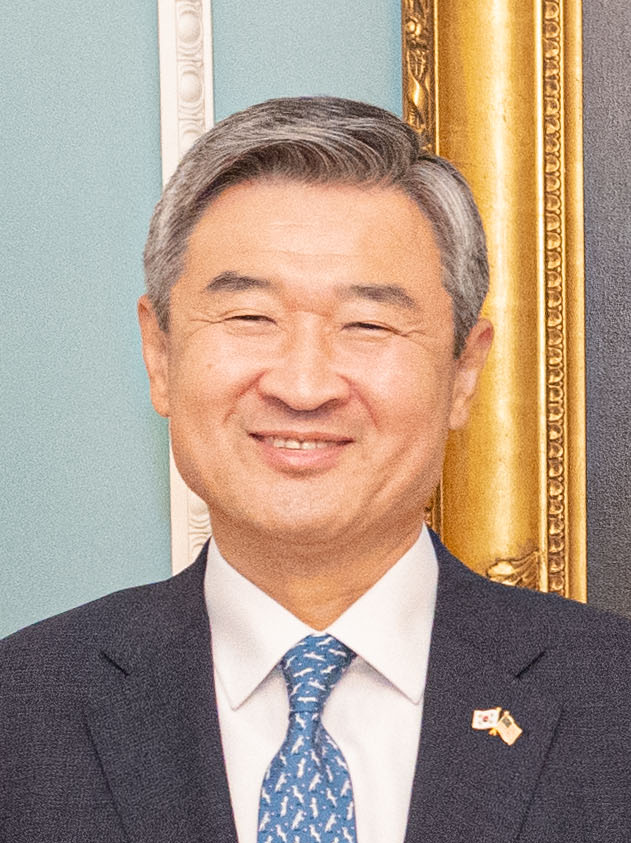

Director of the National Intelligence Service
- In office 16 January 2024 – 19 June 2025
- President: Yoon Suk-yeol
- Preceded by: Kim Kyou-hyun
- Succeeded by: Lee Jong-seok

Director of the National Security Office
- In office 30 March 2023 – 31 December 2023
- President: Yoon Suk-yeol
- Preceded by: Kim Sung-han
- Succeeded by: Chang Ho-jin

South Korean Ambassador to the United States
- In office 11 June 2022 – 29 March 2023
- President: Yoon Suk-yeol
- Preceded by: Lee Soo-hyuck
- Succeeded by: Cho Hyun-dong

Personal details
- Born: 29 August 1956 (age 70) Seoul, South Korea
- Party: Independent
- Education: Seoul National University (BA)
- Criminal information
- Movement: 2024 martial law
- Status: In prison
- Convictions: Perjury; Fabrication of official documents
- Penalty: Perjury and fabrication of official documents: 18 months imprisonment

Details
- Date apprehended: 12 November 2025

Cho Tae-yong (Korean: 조태용; Hanja: 趙太庸; born 29 August 1956) is a South Korean career diplomat and politician with over three decades of experience who served as South Korea's National Security Advisor from March to December 2023. On January 16, 2024, he was appointed Director of the National Intelligence Service of South Korea, serving until June 2025.

Cho has extensive experience in a range of high-level diplomatic assignments dealing with the United States and North Korea. In November 2016, he represented South Korea in talks with Michael Flynn and other members of then-U.S. President-elect Donald Trump's foreign policy team on North Korea. He and then-U.S. Deputy Secretary of State Antony Blinken held five rounds of U.S.-South Korea strategic consultations on North Korea between 2015 and 2017. As South Korea's First Vice Foreign Minister between 2014 and 2015, he represented South Korea in regular U.S.-South Korea-Japan trilateral talks with U.S. Deputy Secretary of State Tony Blinken and Japanese Vice Foreign Minister Shinsuke Sugiyama.

On 12 November 2025, Cho was arrested on charges of involvement in the 2024 South Korean martial law crisis. On 21 May 2026, Cho was found guilty of perjury during his testimony to the National Assembly and falsifying an official document that backed up his false statements, and sentenced to 18 months in prison.

== Early life ==
Cho was born in Seoul in 1956, and received his bachelor's degree in political science from Seoul National University.

== Career ==
Among various other positions, Cho was previously South Korea's First Vice Foreign Minister of Foreign Affairs from 2014 to 2015 and South Korea's Special Representative for Korean Peninsula Peace and Security Affairs from 2013 to 2014. Cho also previously served as the South Korean Ambassador to Australia from 2011 to 2013, Ambassador to Ireland from 2008 to 2009, and Director General of the North American Affairs Bureau of the South Korean Foreign Ministry from 2006 to 2007.

Cho has been working on North Korean affairs since 2004. He was Director General of the South Korean foreign ministry's Task Force on North Korea, and deputy head of the South Korean delegation to the six-party talks in Beijing in 2004. He was named South Korea's special representative for Korean Peninsula peace and security affairs in 2013, and then became Vice-Minister of Foreign Affairs in 2014.

On 12 November 2025, Cho was arrested on charges of involvement in the 2024 South Korean martial law crisis, including NIS law violations, dereliction of duty, perjury, destruction of evidence, creation of false official documents and false testimony in parliament.

On 18 May 2026, he and five other former NIS political appointees including former deputy NIS director Hong Jang-won were also booked for questioning for performing key duties related to the insurrection.

On 21 May 2026, Cho was found guilty of perjury during his testimony to the National Assembly and falsifying an official document that backed up his false statements, and sentenced to 18 months in prison. However Cho was also acquitted of destroying evidence by deleting secure phone call records and violating the NIS Act’s ban on political involvement of the NIS.

== See also ==
- Politics of South Korea
- Foreign relations of South Korea

Diplomatic posts
Preceded by Lee Soo-hyuck	Ambassador of Republic of Korea to United States; 2022–2023	Succeeded by Cho Hyun-dong
