= Han Duck-soo =

Prime Minister of South Korea (2007–2008; 2022–2025)

- 한덕수
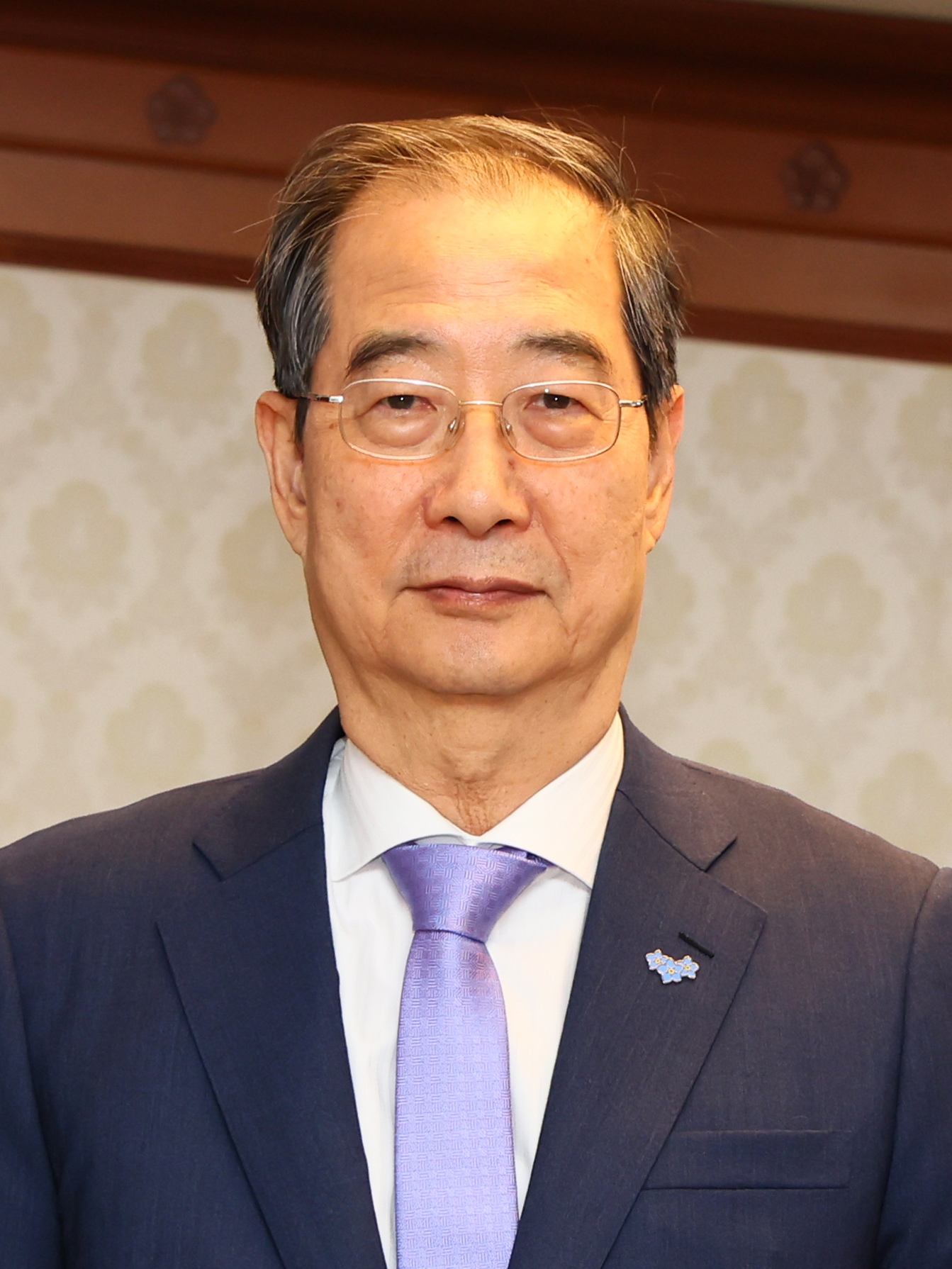
- Han Duck-soo in 2024

Acting President of South Korea
- In office 24 March 2025 – 1 May 2025 (Note: Yoon's powers and duties were suspended due to his impeachment. His presidency was officially ended after the Constitutional Court of Korea upheld his impeachment on 4 April 2025. Han assumed Yoon's powers and duties as acting president on 14 December 2024, but was impeached himself and had his powers and duties suspended between 27 December 2024 and 24 March 2025, when his impeachment was overturned.)
- Prime Minister: Himself
- Preceded by: Choi Sang-mok (acting)
- Succeeded by: Lee Ju-ho (acting)
- In office 14 December 2024 – 27 December 2024
- Prime Minister: Himself
- Preceded by: Yoon Suk Yeol
- Succeeded by: Choi Sang-mok (acting)

38th & 48th Prime Minister of South Korea
- In office 21 May 2022 – 1 May 2025 (Note: Choi Sang-mok served as acting prime minister while Han's powers and duties were suspended from 27 December 2024 to 24 March 2025.)
- President: Yoon Suk Yeol; Himself (acting); Choi Sang-mok (acting); Himself (acting)
- Deputy: Choo Kyung-ho; Choi Sang-mok; Park Soon-ae; Lee Ju-ho
- Preceded by: Kim Boo-kyum; Choo Kyung-ho (acting)
- Succeeded by: Lee Ju-ho (acting); Kim Min-seok
- In office 3 April 2007 – 28 February 2008
- President: Roh Moo-hyun; Lee Myung-bak
- Preceded by: Han Myeong-sook; Kwon O-kyu (acting)
- Succeeded by: Han Seung-soo
- Acting; 16 March 2006 – 19 April 2006
- President: Roh Moo-hyun
- Preceded by: Lee Hae-chan
- Succeeded by: Han Myeong-sook

South Korean Ambassador to the United States
- In office 9 March 2009 – 17 February 2012
- President: Lee Myung-bak
- Preceded by: Lee Tae-sik
- Succeeded by: Choi Young-jin

Deputy Prime Minister and Minister of Economy and Finance
- In office 14 March 2005 – 18 July 2006
- Prime Minister: Lee Hae-chan; Himself (acting); Han Myeong-sook
- Preceded by: Lee Hun-jai
- Succeeded by: Kwon O-kyu

Personal details
- Born: 18 June 1949 (age 77) Jeonju, South Korea
- Party: People Power (since 2025)
- Other political affiliations: Independent (until 2025)
- Spouse: Choi Ah-young (최아영)
- Education: Seoul National University (BA); Harvard University (MA, PhD)

Military service
- Allegiance: South Korea
- Branch: Republic of Korea Army
- Rank: Sergeant
- Scientific career
- Fields: Economics
- Thesis: External shocks, adjustments, and growth: Korean case (1984)
- Doctoral advisor: Hollis B. Chenery; Dwight H. Perkins
- Criminal information
- Movement: 2024 martial law
- Convictions: 3 counts (Note: Aiding an insurrection; Perjury; Falsification and destruction of official documents)
- Penalty: 15 years imprisonment

Details
- Date apprehended: 21 January 2026
- Imprisoned at: Seoul Detention Center

Korean name
- Hangul: 한덕수
- Hanja: 韓悳洙
- RR: Han Deoksu
- MR: Han Tŏksu
- Han Duck-soo's voice Han Duck-soo endorsing Kim Moon-soo for the 2025 South Korean presidential election Recorded 11 May 2025

Han Duck-soo (Korean: 한덕수; born 18 June 1949) is a South Korean diplomat, economist, and politician who served as the acting president of South Korea in December 2024 and from March to May 2025 and as the prime minister of South Korea from 2007 to 2008 and from 2022 to 2025. (Note: Choi Sang-mok served as acting prime minister during Han's suspension of powers and duties from 27 December 2024 to 24 March 2025.)

Born in Jeonju, Han is the fifth person to hold the prime minister's office twice, having served under Presidents Roh Moo-hyun and Yoon Suk Yeol. He also held office as the minister of economy and finance from 2005 to 2006, the ambassador to the United States from 2009 to 2012, and the chairman of the Korea International Trade Association from 2012 to 2015.

After the impeachment of Yoon Suk Yeol on 14 December 2024, Han became the acting president of South Korea. Thirteen days later, Han himself was also impeached by the National Assembly of South Korea due to his refusal to promulgate two special counsel bills that sought to investigate the impeached president Yoon Suk Yeol and his wife Kim Keon-hee, along with failing to appoint three National Assembly-designated candidates for the Constitutional Court of Korea. This ended his role as acting president and suspended his powers as prime minister, with both duties being transferred to Choi Sang-mok.

However, Han was reinstated as both acting president and prime minister on 24 March 2025, following a 7–1 vote from the court. After Yoon's removal from office in April 2025, Han was initially expected to serve as acting president until the 2025 presidential election, but he resigned on 1 May to launch an independent bid for president, and was briefly the People Power Party candidate while Kim Moon-soo's nomination was suspended and then restored on 10 May.

In August 2025, Han was indicted by special prosecutors investigating Yoon's 2024 martial law declaration. On 21 January 2026, Han was found guilty and sentenced to 23 years in prison for his role in the martial law declaration, on charges of insurrection, perjury, falsifying and destroying official documents. The sentence was reduced to 15 years imprisonment on appeal and the conviction of insurrection reduced to aiding an insurrection, while upholding the original guilty verdict on the other two charges, on 7 May.

== Early life and education ==
Han was born on 18 June 1949 in Jeonju, South Korea, as the fifth of six sons and three daughters to Han Byeong-ho and Jeonju Choi. He served in the South Korean Army and was discharged as a sergeant. Han graduated from Seoul National University with a bachelor's degree in economics in 1971. He received a master's degree in economics in 1979 and a doctorate in economics in 1984 from Harvard University.

== Early political career ==
Han started his political career at the National Tax Service in 1970 and joined the Economic Planning Board four years later. In 1982, he moved to what is now the Ministry of Trade, Industry and Energy, where he eventually became Vice Minister. He held the office from 1997 to 1998, during which the 1997 Asian financial crisis took place. After Han left the position, he was Minister of Trade Affairs from 1998 to 2000, where his primary role was handling trade negotiations with foreign governments.

Han became Minister of Finance in March 2005. Later, he briefly served as Acting Prime Minister from 14 March 2006 to 19 April 2006. He resigned as Finance Minister in July 2006 and became a special presidential advisor for free trade agreement affairs.

== Premierships (2007–08, 2022–25) ==
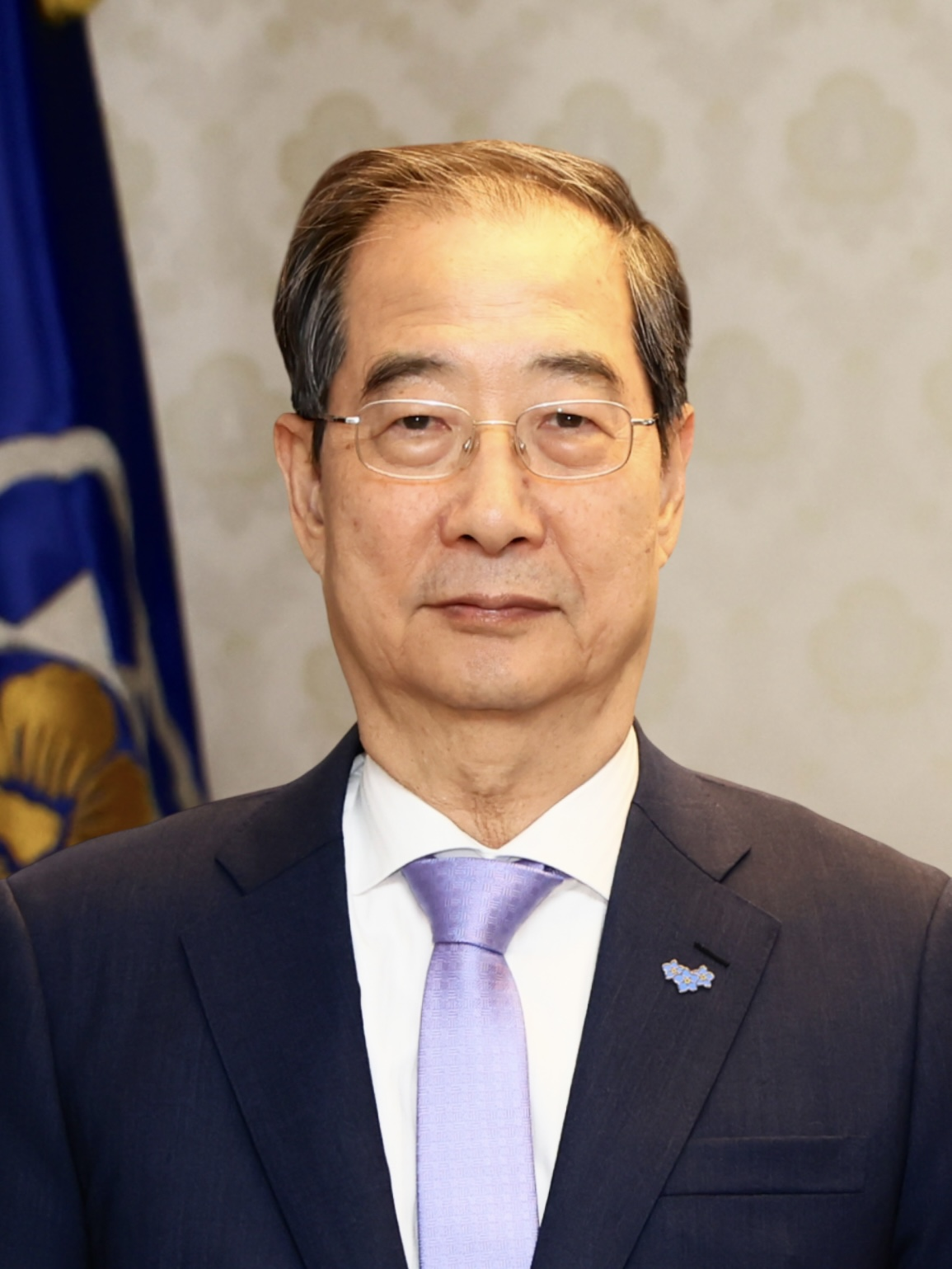
- Premierships of Han Duck-soo; Acting from 16 March – 19 April 2006
- President: Roh Moo-hyun (2007–2008); Yoon Suk Yeol (2022–2025); Himself (Apr.–May 2025)
- Party: Independent
- Seat: Sejong City
- First term 2 April 2007 – 29 February 2008
- Cabinet: Full list
- Second term 21 May 2022 – 1 May 2025; Powers suspended from 27 December 2024 to 24 March 2025
- Cabinet: Full list

=== First premiership (2007–2008) ===
On 9 March 2007, Han was nominated as prime minister by President Roh Moo-hyun following the resignation of Han Myeong-sook. His nomination was approved by the National Assembly on 2 April 2007. He left office on 29 February 2008 after Lee Myung-bak was inaugurated as president, being succeeded in the office by Han Seung-soo.

=== First post–premiership (2009–2022) ===
As Han was viewed as a political centrist, President Lee Myung-bak appointed him as South Korean ambassador to the United States in 2009. During his time as ambassador, he played a major role in reaching the United States–Korea Free Trade Agreement. From 2012 to 2015, Han also served as chairman of the Korea International Trade Association.

=== Second premiership (2022–2025) ===
Han held teaching positions at Hongik University and Dankook University before President-elect Yoon Suk Yeol nominated him for prime minister between 2015 and 2022. During his confirmation hearings, Han claimed stabilizing the economy would be his top priority in office. The Democratic Party, who held a majority of the seats in the National Assembly, and the Justice Party both boycotted his confirmation. However, he was approved in May and became prime minister again at the age of 72 and 11 months, making him the oldest person ever to take the office.

In February 2024, after a government plan to boost admissions into medical schools was introduced, thousands of doctors resigned in protest, claiming it would hurt the quality of service. The protest caused considerable delays to surgical procedures and medical treatment. Han ordered emergency measures to combat the crisis, such as the use of telemedicine, more public hospital operations, and the opening of military clinics. On 22 February, Han announced that South Korea's health alert would be raised to 'severe' during a disaster management meeting. A couple of days later, Han announced that South Korea would send military and community doctors to combat the ongoing emergency.

On 10 April 2024, Han offered his resignation following his party's defeat in the 2024 South Korean legislative elections.

In August 2024, Han advised President Yoon Suk Yeol to veto four bills sponsored by the opposition, claiming they breached the president's nomination rights enshrined in the Constitution. In the same month, amid the prolonged medical crisis, Han announced that hospitals could extend the application period for trainee doctor programs. The statement occurred after only 104 candidates (1.4 percent of trainee doctor positions available in 126 hospitals) had applied for the programs. Han also reported that comprehensive plans for four health care reform tasks and a five year investment plan to boost medical sectors would be announced later in the month.

Han was reported to have been sidelined by President Yoon on the latter's declaration of martial law in December 2024, for which Han apologized and said that he had "consistently" opposed. Han was later named as a suspect by police in their investigation into martial law and underwent questioning. After Yoon's attempted impeachment, Han and People Power Party leader Han Dong-hoon proposed a plan where they would jointly fill in for the role of the presidency. However, the plan was widely criticized and ruled as unconstitutional.

== Acting presidencies (2024, 2025) ==
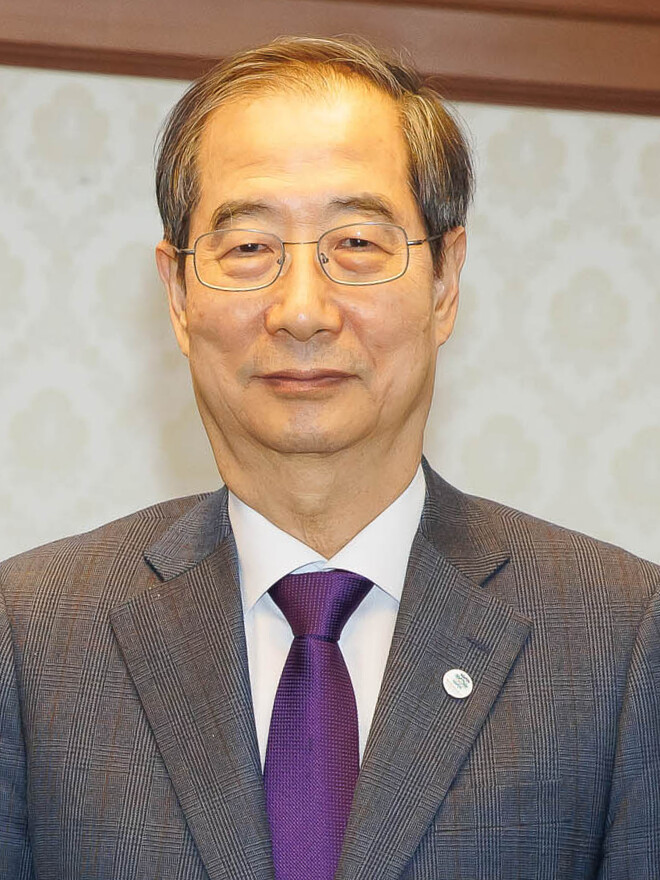
- Acting presidencies of Han Duck-soo
- Prime Minister: Himself
- Cabinet: Full list
- Party: Independent
- Seat: Seoul
- First term 14 December 2024 – 27 December 2024 (Removal)
- Second term 24 March 2025 – 1 May 2025

=== First acting presidency (2024) ===
Han became the acting president of South Korea following the impeachment of President Yoon Suk Yeol on 14 December 2024. When Han was being asked by police for questioning in its investigation of martial law, Democratic Party leader Lee Jae-myung said that the party would not move to impeach Han for the time being to avoid "confusion in their state affairs".

As acting president, Han vetoed six bills passed by the National Assembly that had been sponsored by the Democratic Party on 19 December. Among the bills vetoed were proposed amendments to the Grain Management Act, which would have required the government to purchase surplus rice to stabilize prices during market fluctuations. Han cited concerns over its effect on the market as a reason for vetoing the bill. Other measures he vetoed included a bill requiring companies to submit requested data to members of the National Assembly, saying that it was an invasion of constitutional rights to privacy.

=== Impeachment and acquittal ===
On 24 December, the Democratic Party said that it would seek to impeach Han due to his failure to promulgate two special counsel bills that sought to investigate Yoon and his wife Kim over his martial law declaration and charges of corruption. The motion was filed on 26 December after Han asked the National Assembly to agree on three nominees to the Constitutional Court of Korea, with the plenary vote scheduled on 27 December. Prior to the vote, Speaker Woo Won-shik ruled that Han can be impeached by a simple majority due to his status as a cabinet minister, paving the way for him to be impeached by 192 MPs on 27 December. Han was succeeded as acting president and acting prime minister by Choi Sang-mok. This triggered a 180-day period for the Constitutional Court of Korea to try Han in. Han's impeachment trial began on 19 February 2025, with Han in attendance. Han reiterated his denial of prior knowledge of Yoon's plans to declare martial law and insisted that he had tried to dissuade him from doing so. He also apologized to the public for the ongoing political crisis and asked the country to make a "wise judgment" to enable the nation to reach an "era of rationality". Han also said that the approval of special counsel bills to investigate Yoon and his wife would have "fundamentally violated the principles of constitutional governance".

On 14 February 2025, the Constitutional Court ordered Han to testify as a witness in Yoon's impeachment at a hearing scheduled on 20 February. On that day, Han testified that members of Yoon's cabinet were concerned about his plans to declare martial law and tried to dissuade him from doing so, while denying claims from defense minister Kim Yong-hyun that some members were in support of the plan. He also said that the martial law declaration did not follow constitutional and legal procedures and questioned whether Yoon's cabinet meeting on 3 December 2024, in which Yoon revealed his plans to declare martial law, was a proper one.

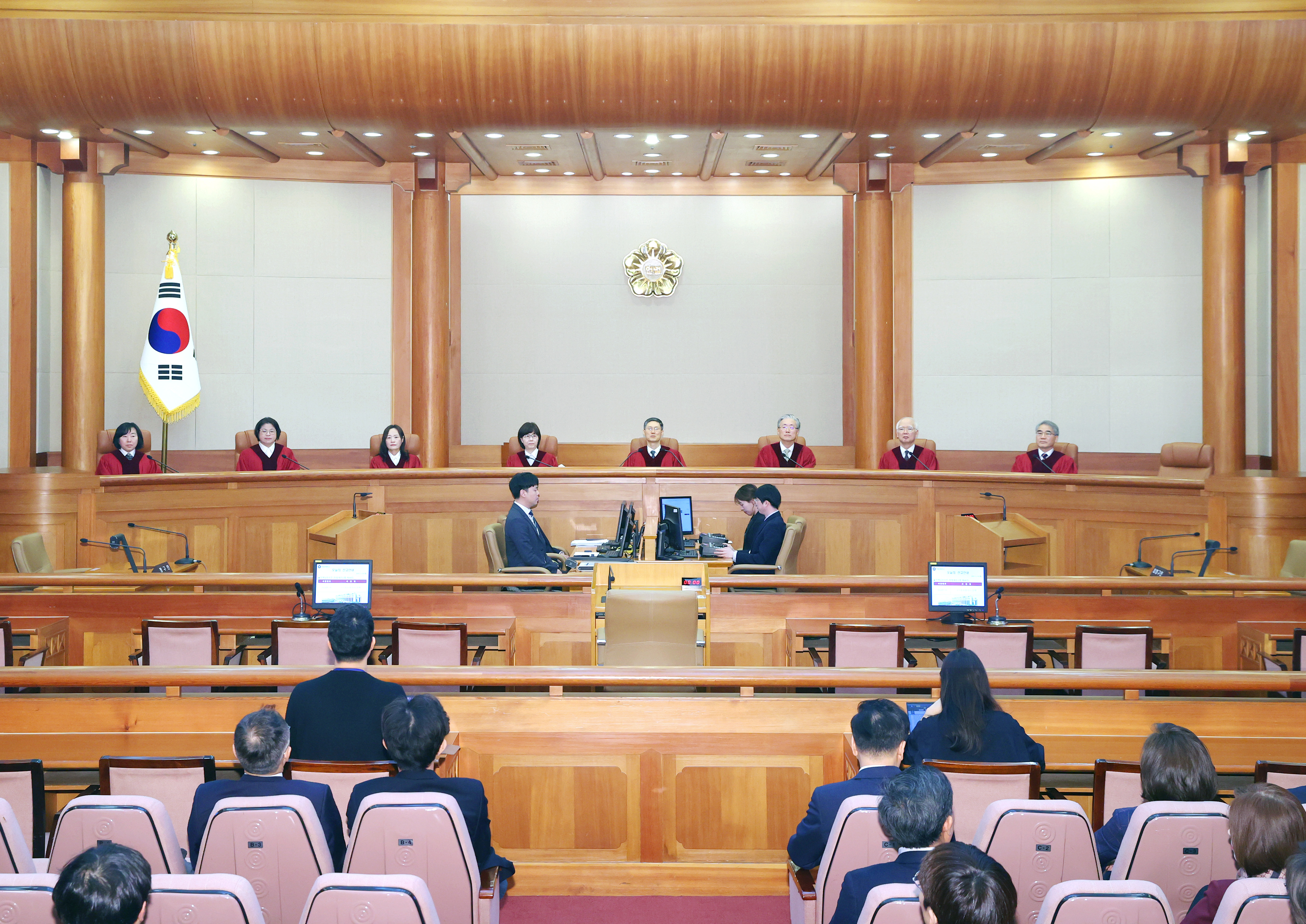
The Constitutional Court of Korea rules on Han's impeachment in March 2025

On 24 March 2025, the Constitutional Court voted to overturn Han's impeachment, allowing his reinstatement as acting president. Five justices voted to dismiss the impeachment, two voted to reject it and only one justice voted to uphold it. The court acknowledged that Han committed constitutional and legal violations in deferring the appointment of additional justices to the court, but said it did not justify his removal from office. It also ruled that the quorum to impeach Han was the minimum 151 out of 300 lawmakers needed for a prime minister, rather than the 200 needed to impeach a president.

=== Second acting presidency (2025) ===
On retaking office on 24 March, Han pledged to ensure stable governance and protect South Korean interests amid the trade war imposed by the United States, while appealing for national unity amid the impeachment of Yoon Suk Yeol. Among his first acts upon resuming office was overseeing the response to the 2025 South Korea wildfires, which he described as the worst in the country's history.

On 1 April, Han vetoed an amendment to the Commercial Act that would have expanded the fiduciary duty of corporate directors from solely the "company" to both the "company and its shareholders", citing possible repercussions on the business environment and the competitiveness of both large and small enterprises.

After the Constitutional Court unanimously ruled to uphold Yoon Suk Yeol's impeachment and remove him from office on 4 April, Han was scheduled to continue as acting president until the 2025 South Korean presidential election, which Han set on 3 June.

On 8 April, Han held his first phone call with US president Donald Trump. Han said that he would not join China and Japan in retaliating jointly against tariffs imposed by Trump. That same day, Han appointed Ma Eun-hyuk to fill the ninth and remaining vacancy in the Constitutional Court, and announced two nominations to replace justices retiring on 18 April. The nominations were criticized by the Democratic Party and other opposition parties, with the Democratic Party noting that one of the nominees, minister of government legislation Lee Wan-kyu, had been reported to the Corruption Investigation Office for High-ranking Officials (CIO) on charges of insurrection related to Yoon's martial law declaration. On 16 April, the Constitutional Court accepted an injunction suspending the nominations, saying that it could not definitively rule on whether Han as prime minister and concurrent acting president has the authority to nominate and appoint Constitutional Court judges.

On 29 April, Han vetoed a bill that would have limited his powers to nominate or appoint justices to the Constitutional Court, citing conflict with constitutional provisions regarding the powers of acting presidents.

=== Nomination of Constitutional Court justices ===
On 8 April 2025, he appointed Ma Eun-hyuk, a Constitutional Court justice recommended by the National Assembly, and Ma Yong-joo, a Supreme Court justice recommended by the chief justice and approved by the National Assembly. In addition, as acting president, he nominated Lee Wan-kyu, Minister of Government Legislation, and Ham Sang-hoon, a presiding judge at the Seoul High Court, as replacements for Moon Hyung-bae and Lee Mi-seon, whose terms as Constitutional Court justices were to end on 18 April.

However, constitutional scholars criticized this as unconstitutional, stating that the acting president's nomination of Constitutional Court justices was an "unauthorized and unconstitutional acts" beyond his powers. Moreover, nominee Lee Wan-kyu was reportedly present at a secret meeting held shortly after the 3 December Rebellion, raising serious suspicions of direct complicity in the rebellion.

Former prime minister Hwang Kyo-ahn, who served as acting president during the impeachment and removal of Park Geun-hye, did not appoint any Constitutional Court justices after her removal, instead leaving the appointment to the incoming president.

On 15 April, a resolution calling for the withdrawal of the nominations of Lee Wan-kyu and Ham Sang-hoon was passed by the National Assembly, led by the Democratic Party, with unanimous approval from all 168 members present. The People Power Party protested and walked out of the session. The National Assembly Steering Committee held a meeting that morning and passed the resolution calling for the withdrawal of the nominations, again led by the Democratic Party. The People Power Party members did not attend. On the same day, the Constitutional Court reportedly convened at 10 a.m. to deliberate on whether the nominations by the acting president were unconstitutional.

Eventually, on 16 April 2025, the Constitutional Court unanimously approved an injunction (2025헌사399) suspending the effect of the acting president's nominations of Constitutional Court justices. Han's nominations were subsequently withdrawn in June by the newly-inaugurated president, Lee Jae-myung.

== Post-presidency and 2025 presidential campaign ==
After a month of teasing a presidential campaign himself, Han announced his resignation as both the acting president and the prime minister on 1 May, citing his desire to "unify the country and prevent extreme political confrontations". He declared his campaign for the presidency on 2 May, during which he pledged to serve for only three years as president to oversee amendments to the Constitution, address issues caused by US tariff policies and promote national unity.

Han's first campaign event was to attend the May 18th National Cemetery commemorating the victims of the Gwangju Uprising on 2 May. However, he was blocked by protesters from entering and was struck in the head by a protest placard.

Han also engaged in negotiations with People Power Party (PPP) candidate Kim Moon-soo on fielding a common conservative candidate for the presidential election. However, Han has said he would not register his candidacy until a final agreement is reached with Kim on a unified candidate, while Kim has claimed that the PPP and its chair, Kwon Young-se, has moved unilaterally to unify candidacies without consulting him. A meeting between Han and Kim ended without an agreement on 7 May.

The PPP said on 10 May that they would outright cancel Kim's nomination, and instead nominate Han at an emergency convention the same day. However, members of the PPP rejected a resolution designating Han as the party's candidate following an all-party vote, resulting in Kim's nomination being reinstated. Han issued an apology over the dispute within the PPP. On 11 May, Han officially ended his campaign. and pledged to support Kim's candidacy. He rejected an offer by Kim to serve as his campaign chair.

=== 'Gwangju Crisis' remarks ===
On several occasions in 2025, Han used the expression "Gwangju Crisis" (광주사태) in reference to the 1980 Gwangju Uprising protests against South Korea's military dictatorship, instead of the more commonly accepted names for the event such as the "May 18 Democratization Movement" (5·18 민주화운동). First used by the military dictator Chun Doo-hwan, who perpetrated the violent and deadly suppression of the uprising, this phrase is considered a historic euphemism used by the supporters of the violence to obscure and minimize the legitimacy of the protests. A number of groups that commemorate the Gwangju Uprising issued statements condemning Han's use of the term.

== Indictment and imprisonment ==
=== Travel ban ===
On 27 May 2025, both Han and former Finance Minister Choi were barred from traveling abroad after being named as a suspect in the insurrection case against Yoon Suk Yeol over his martial law declaration, after CC-TV footage of Han conversing with former Defense Minister Kim the day of the martial law declaration was discovered.

=== Indictment and trial ===
On 29 August 2025, Han was indicted by special prosecutors without physical detention on charges of abetting the ringleader of an insurrection, perjury, falsifying and destroying official documents. His trial began on 30 September.

Charges:

- Abetting and playing a key role in an insurrection: Han’s role in convening a Cabinet meeting to create the appearance of deliberation, collecting ministers’ signatures to meet formal requirements, failing in his duty as prime minister and vice chair of the Cabinet to ensure democratic procedures, discussing the potential shutdown of utilities at certain media outlets with then Interior Minister Lee Sang-min, and encouraging Cabinet members to sign and formalize the decree. Han was also accused of failing to clearly express opposition even as other ministers voiced objections.
- Falsifying and destroying official documents: Ordering the creation of a new martial law decree on 6 December 2024 — three days after the declaration — in an attempt to legitimize the move retroactively, before ordering the document destroyed illegally.
- Perjury: Han was accused of falsely testifying during Yoon’s impeachment trial that he had no prior knowledge of the martial law decree and had not received any related documents.

=== Verdict and imprisonment ===
On 21 January 2026, Han Duck-soo was sentenced to 23 years in prison in the insurrection case linked to the declaration of martial law. The court found that Han deliberately fabricated the appearance of a legitimate cabinet meeting to approve the martial law decree. He was also convicted of falsifying documents, destroying presidential records, and committing perjury during Yoon’s impeachment proceedings. Notably, the 23-year sentence was significantly more than the 15 years requested by prosecutors. Han was immediately taken into custody following the verdict.

On 7 May 2026, following an appeal by Han's lawyers, a panel of judges, at the Seoul High Court quashed the original 23-year sentence and reduced it to 15 years, taking into account Han's five decades in public service, and lack of evidence to prove he had taken part in preplanning or played a leadership role in the insurrection.

== Personal life ==
Han is married to Choi Ah-young and has no children.

== Honours ==
=== National honors ===
- South Korea:
  - Recipient of the Order of Civil Merit, Mugunghwa Medal (2013)
  - Recipient of the Order of Service Merit, Blue Stripe (2012)
  - Recipient of the Order of Muhunhwa (2024) (As acting president of the country)

== Notes ==
Political offices
Preceded by Lee Hun-jai	Minister of Finance and Economy; 2005–2006	Succeeded by Kwon O-kyu
Preceded by Lee Hae-chan	Prime Minister of South Korea (Acting); 2006	Succeeded by Han Myeong-sook
Preceded by Han Myeong-sook; Kwon O-kyu (Acting)	Prime Minister of South Korea; 2007–2008	Succeeded by Han Seung-soo
Preceded by Kim Boo-kyum; Choo Kyung-ho (Acting)	Prime Minister of South Korea; 2022–2025; Powers and duties suspended: 2024–2025	Succeeded by Choi Sang-mok (Acting); Lee Ju-ho (Acting); Kim Min-seok
Preceded by Yoon Suk Yeol	President of South Korea (Acting); Acting for Yoon Suk Yeol: 2024	Succeeded by Choi Sang-mok (Acting)
Preceded by Choi Sang-mok (Acting)	President of South Korea (Acting); Acting for Yoon Suk Yeol: 2025; Vacant presidency: 2025	Succeeded by Lee Ju-ho (Acting)
Diplomatic posts
Preceded by Lee Tae-sik	South Korean Ambassador to the United States; 2009–2012	Succeeded by Choi Young-jin
Notes and references
1. Choi Sang-mok served as acting prime minister during Han's suspension of powers and duties from 27 December 2024 to 24 March 2025.
