= Cho Hyun-dong =

South Korean diplomat (born 1960)

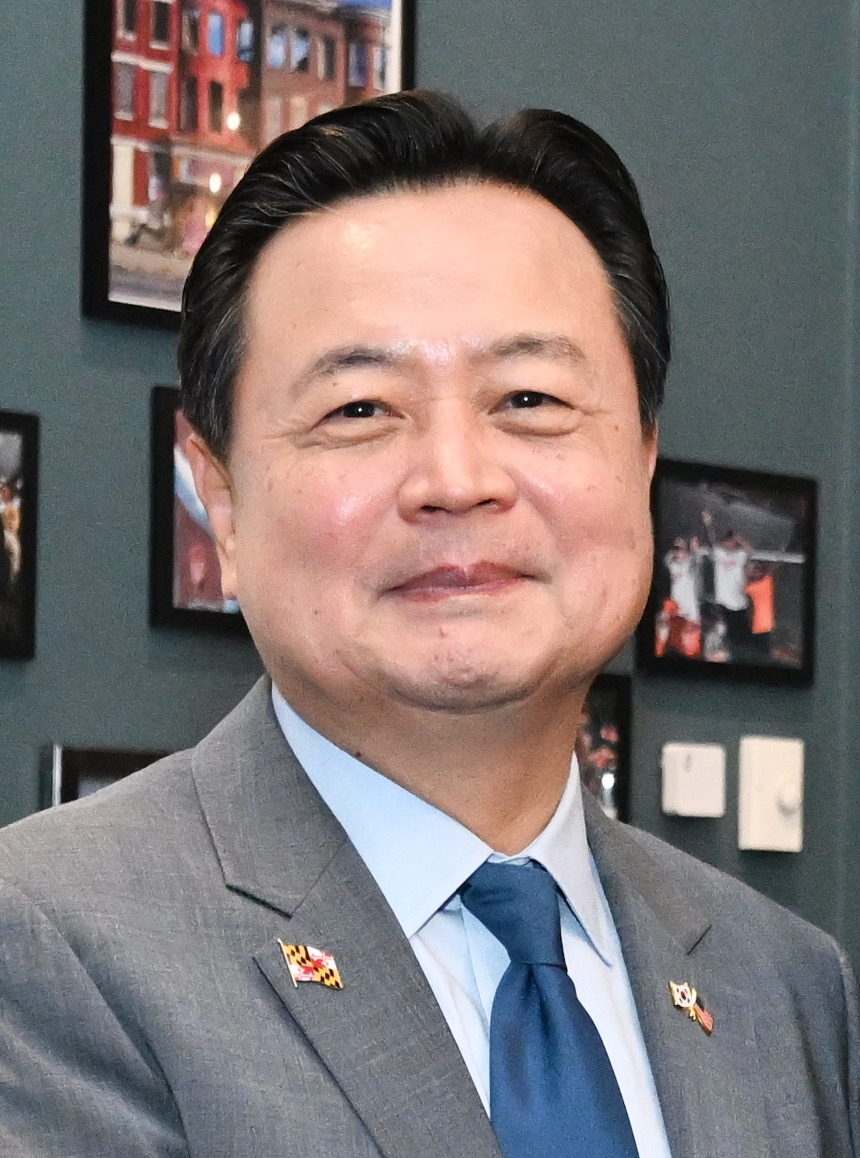
- Cho in 2024

28th South Korean ambassador to the United States
- In office 12 April 2023 – 12 July 2025
- President: Yoon Suk-yeol; Lee Jae Myung
- Preceded by: Cho Tae-yong
- Succeeded by: Kang Kyung-wha

First Vice Minister of Foreign Affairs
- In office 25 May 2022 – 12 April 2023
- President: Yoon Suk-yeol
- Preceded by: Choi Jong-gun
- Succeeded by: Chang Ho-jin

Personal details
- Born: 1960 (age 65–66) Seoul, South Korea
- Party: Independent
- Education: Hankuk University of Foreign Studies

Korean name
- Hangul: 조현동
- RR: Jo Hyeondong
- MR: Cho Hyŏndong

Cho Hyun-dong (Korean: 조현동; born 1960) is a South Korean diplomat. He served as the first deputy foreign minister of the Yoon Suk Yeol government and served as the 28th South Korean ambassador to the United States in 2023–2025.

== See also ==
- Politics of South Korea
- Foreign relations of South Korea
