= Fourteenth Street Historic District =

Historic district in Washington, D.C.

- U.S. National Register of Historic Places
- U.S. Historic district
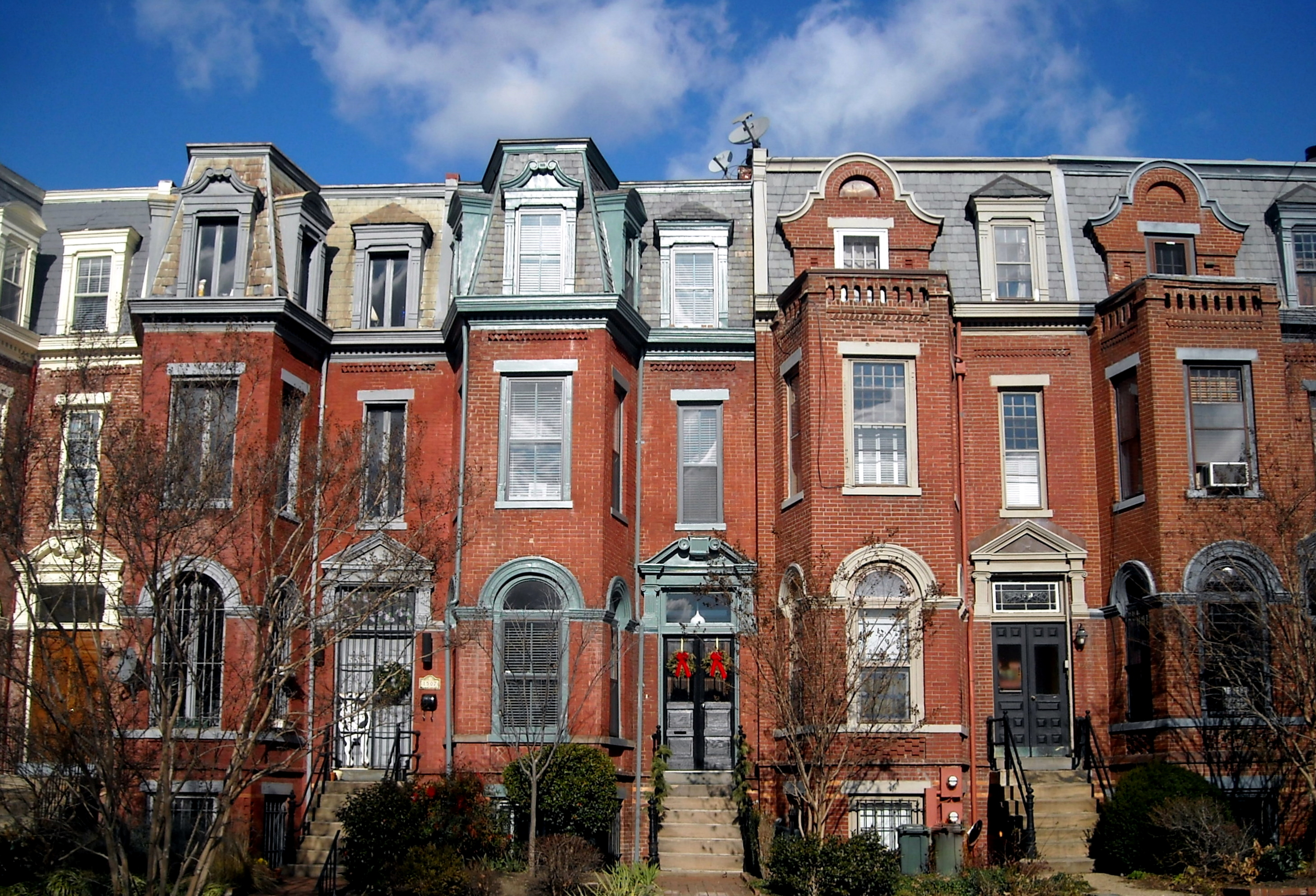

- Location within Washington, D.C.
- Location: Roughly bounded by S, 12th, N and 15th Streets, NW; Washington, D.C.
- Coordinates: 38°54′30″N 77°1′47″W
- NRHP reference No.: 94000992
- Added to NRHP: November 9, 1994

The Fourteenth Street Historic District is located in the Logan Circle and U Street Corridor (a.k.a. Cardozo/Shaw) neighborhoods of Washington, D.C. It was listed on both the District of Columbia Inventory of Historic Sites and the National Register of Historic Places in 1994. The area was then expanded on both lists in 2007.

== History ==
Development began in the area after the American Civil War along one of Washington's first street car lines. It illustrates the boom and bust cycle of this mode of transportation in the city. There are approximately 765 buildings that date from about 1859 to the mid-1930s. Residential styles employed include the Second Empire, Eastlake, Queen Anne and Romanesque Revival. There is also a collection of early 20th century automobile showrooms in the district as well.
