= Hyun Hong-choo =

South Korean politician

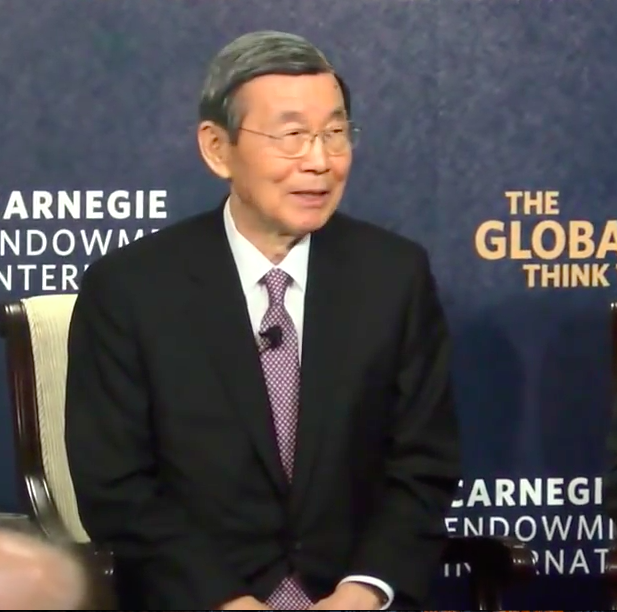
- Hyun Hong-choo on 9 September 2015

South Korean Ambassador to the United States
- In office March 1991 – April 1993
- President: Roh Tae-woo
- Preceded by: Pak Tongjin
- Succeeded by: Han Seung-soo

Member of the National Assembly
- In office 1985–1988

Personal details
- Born: 19 August 1940
- Died: 26 May 2017 (aged 76)
- Party: Democratic Justice Party
- Education: Seoul National University (LLB); Columbia University (LLM)

Hyun Hong-choo (Korean: 현홍주; 19 August 1940 – 26 May 2017) was a South Korean lawyer, politician and diplomat.

He began his legal studies at Seoul National University. Upon graduation in 1963, he took the bar exam and became a prosecutor in 1968. Hyun earned an LLM at Columbia Law School in the United States in 1969. He worked as a prosecutor until 1978, and was elected to the National Assembly as a member of the Democratic Justice Party in 1985.

Hyun stepped down from the legislature in 1988 and was appointed the government legislation chief under president Roh Tae-woo. Hyun was credited with implementing Roh's policy of nordpolitik, and as a diplomat, helped South Korea expand bilateral relations with a number of countries, including Hungary, Poland, Yugoslavia, Czechoslovakia, Bulgaria, and Romania. He was named ambassador to the United Nations in 1990 and became ambassador to the United States the following year, serving until 1993. Hyun then returned to private practice, specializing in international trade and investment. Between 2007 and 2013, Hyun served on the National Unification Advisory Council and was also a national security adviser. From 2013 until his death, Hyun taught at the Korea National Diplomatic Academy, a school run by the Ministry of Foreign Affairs. He died on 26 May 2017.
