= Medical education in South Korea =

Medical education in South Korea includes educational activities involved in the education and training of medical doctors in the country, from entry-level training through to continuing education of qualified specialists.

== History ==
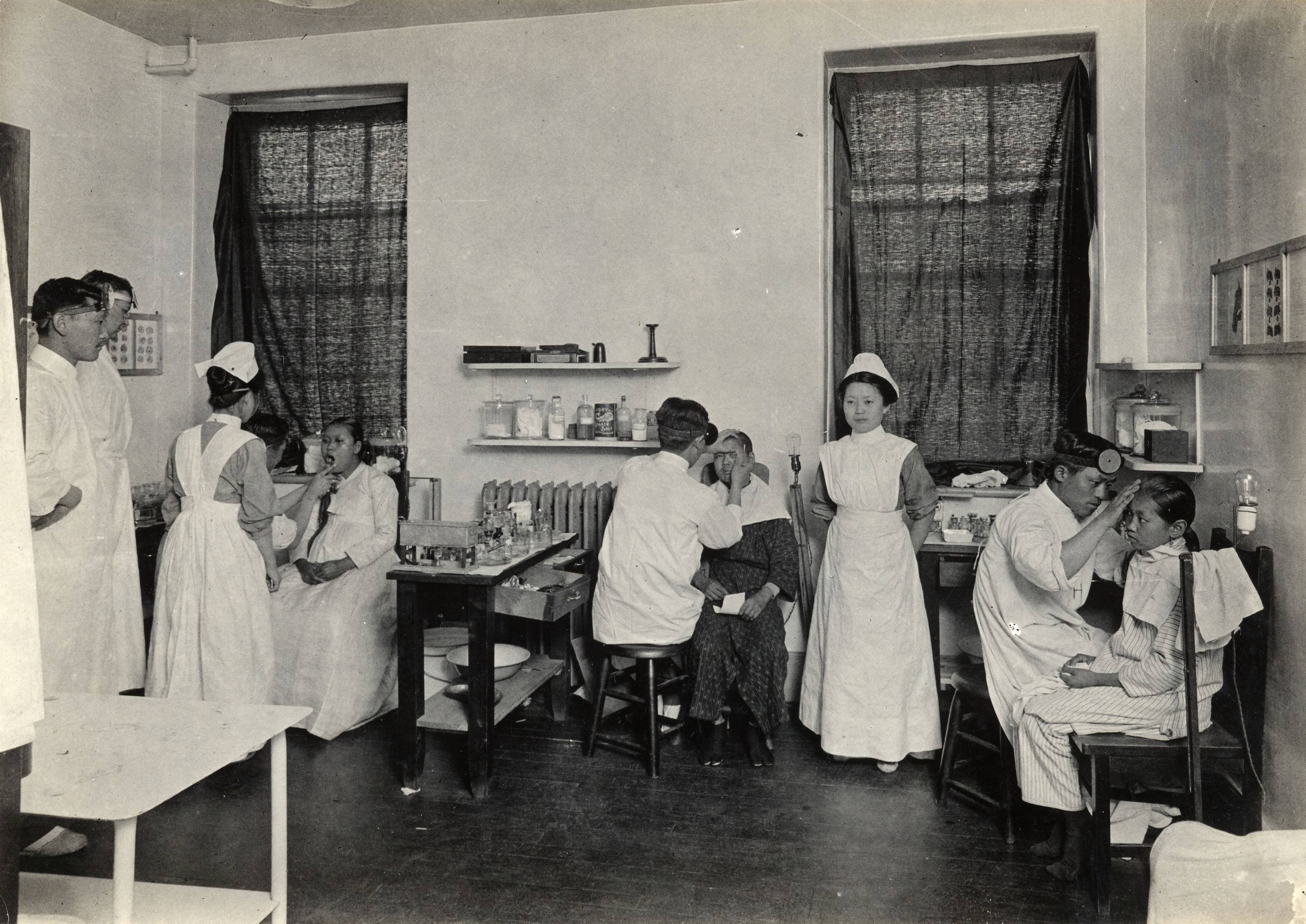
Clinic in Severance Union Medical School

On 29 February 1885, the first Western-style hospital in Korea was founded as a royal hospital named Gwanghyewon (광혜원) with the effort of Horace Newton Allen, a medical missionary of the Presbyterian Church in the United States of America. Twelve days later, Gojong of Korea renamed the hospital as Chejungwon (제중원), and in March 1886, sixteen men were selected as Chejungwon's first class of students to study medicine. Twelve of the sixteen students went on a regular medical course, but the education was stopped in around 1890 and no students became doctors. In 1904, Chejungwon changed its name to Severance Hospital and added Severance Hospital Medical School and the attached School of Nursing. The first seven medical licences in Korean history were awarded to graduates of Severance Hospital Medical School on 3 June 1908. The school became Severance Union Medical School in 1913.

During Japanese colonial rule, in addition to Keijō Imperial University's medical department, seven medical speciality schools (医学専門学校, Igaku semmon gakkō) were accredited. These were Keijō Medical Speciality School, Keijō Women's Medical Speciality School, Severance Union Medical Speciality School (later named Asahi Medical Speciality School) in Keijō, Heijō Medical Speciality School in Heijō, Taikyū Medical Speciality School in Taikyū, Kōshū Medical Speciality School in Kōshū and Kankō Medical Speciality School in Kankō. These medical speciality schools were attended primarily by students from the mainland Japan.

Following the independence of Korea and the Korean War, medical education in South Korea was influenced by American system.

== Medical school ==
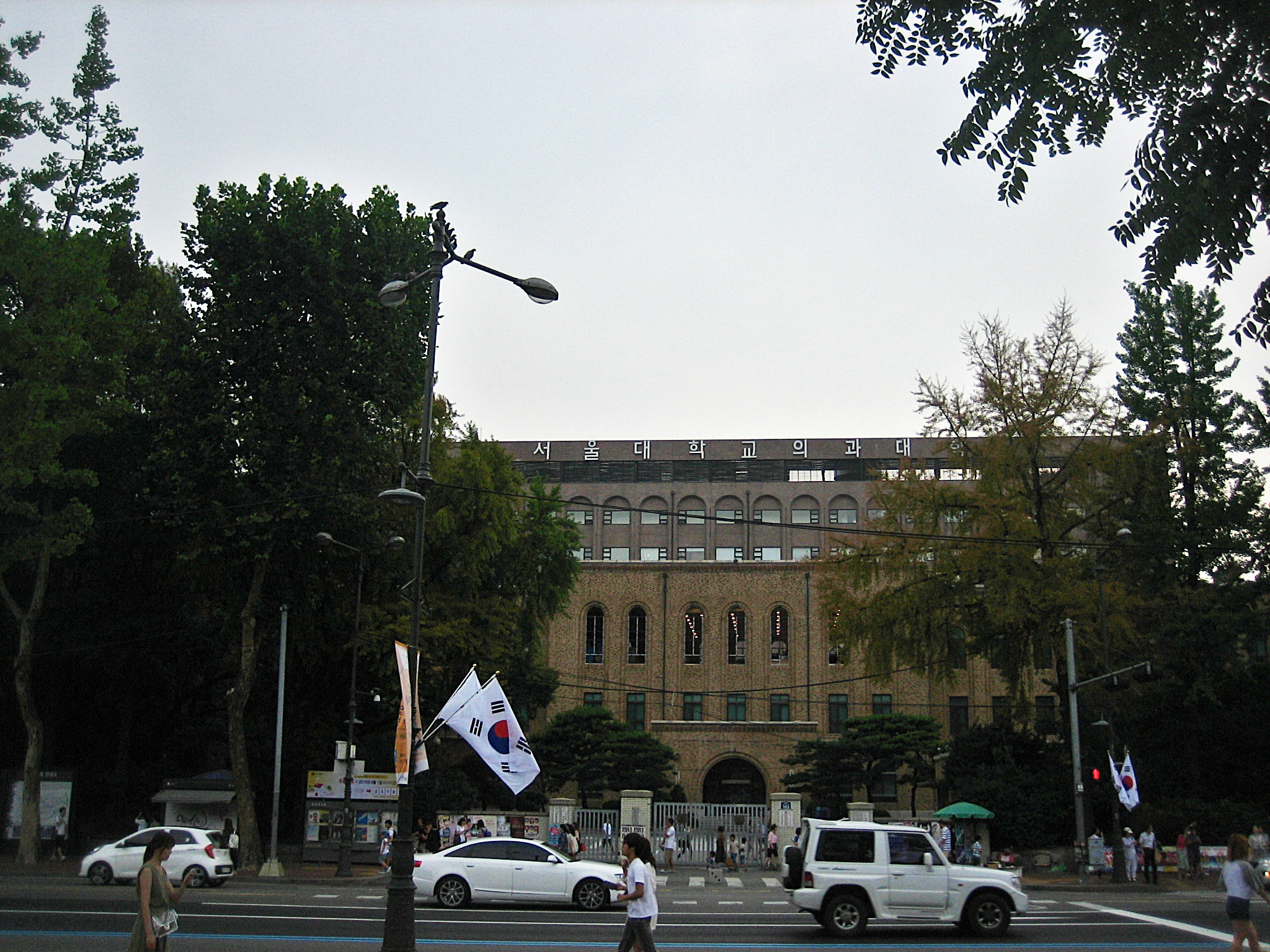
Seoul National University College of Medicine

As of 2023, medical education to become a professional medical doctor is offered by 40 universities. The Bachelor of Medicine, Bachelor of Surgery (의학사) degree is awarded after completion of six years. Medical students must pass the Korean National Medical Licensing Examination to obtain a medical licence. Universities also offer academic, research-oriented degrees including Master of Medicine (의학석사) and Doctor of Philosophy in Medicine (의학박사). A change in the system was under discussion from 1996, and the government started to name the programme professional graduate school of medicine. As with any medical education, it was highly political to change the system, and in 2005, politicians passed a law to allot certain number of students to graduate programme without changing the entire medical student pool. By this change, 4+4-year system, such as those found in the United States and Canada, was introduced to the South Korean medical education. The degree granted is the Doctor of Medicine (의무석사), which has been sometimes translated as 'Master of Medicine' or 'Master of Medical Science'. After roughly 10 years of systematic change, many schools deemed the professional graduate school of medicine was not successful. Financially, the programme at least incurred 1.5 times more tuition than going directly from high school. Due to criticism, almost all of the professional graduate schools of medicine have reverted to six years long undergraduate medical education except one school, Cha University School of Medicine.

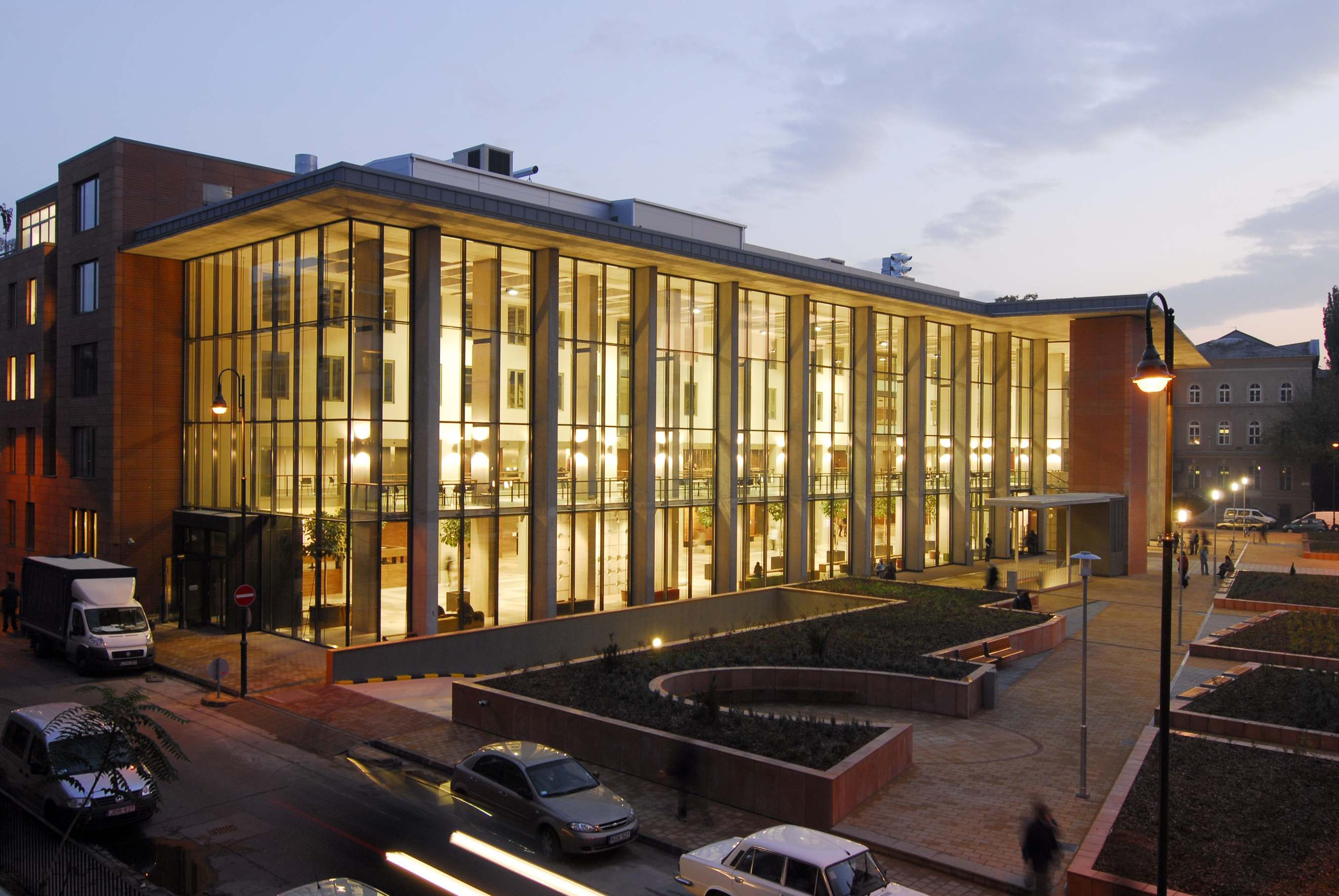
Semmelweis University, Hungary

For international medical graduates to be eligible for licensure in South Korea, they must hold a medical degree from a school acknowledged by the Minister of Health and Welfare, and must pass Korean language proficiency tests and preliminary examination in addition to the national licensing examination. One-third of the international medical graduates who applied for the examinations succeeded in obtaining Korean medical licence as of 2023, and in the period between 2005 and 2023, the largest number of licensed international medical graduates came from schools in the United Kingdom, Paraguay and Hungary. The Philippines had the highest number of graduates who passed the national licensing examination from 2001 to 2005, but the number dropped after a law change on July 7, 1994 that required candidates to obtain medical licences in countries where they have studied, and the Philippine medical licence is given only to the citizens of the Philippines. In 2020, about 20% of the medical students at Semmelweis University and 15% of medical students at University of Szeged Faculty of Medicine were from South Korea. In 2020, Samarkand State Medical University opened its department of pre-medicine in Seoul for Korean students.

South Korea also practices traditional Korean medicine, which has an independent medical education system. Alternative medicine degrees such as the Doctor of Korean Medicine are regulated separately.
