= Han Seung-soo =

South Korean politician (born 1936)

His Excellency Han Seung-soo
- 한승수
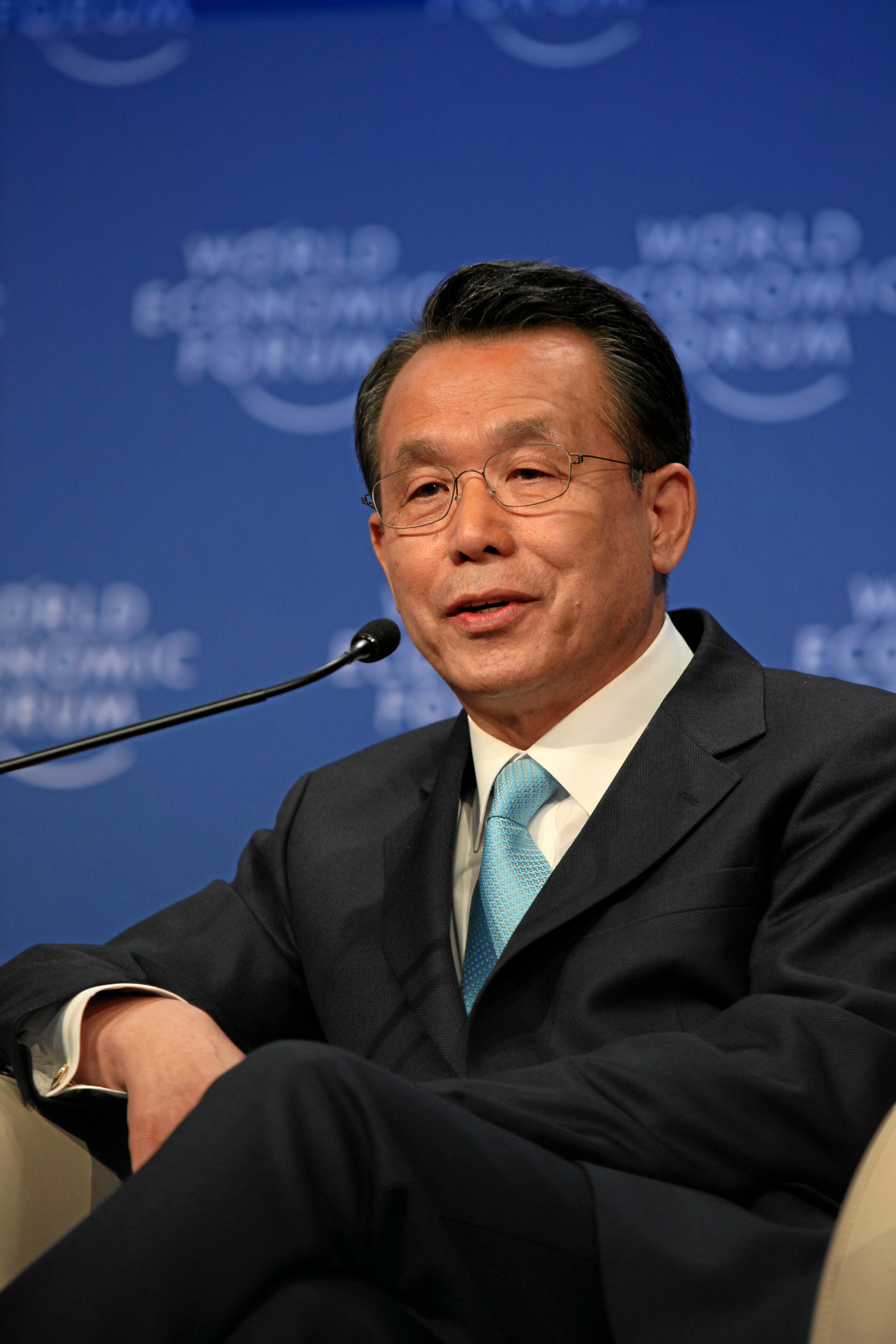
- Han in 2009

39th Prime Minister of South Korea
- In office 29 February 2008 – 28 September 2009
- President: Lee Myung-bak
- Preceded by: Han Duck-soo
- Succeeded by: Chung Un-chan

President of the United Nations General Assembly
- In office 18 September 2001 – 17 September 2002
- Preceded by: Harri Holkeri
- Succeeded by: Jan Kavan

Minister of Foreign Affairs and Trade
- In office 26 March 2001 – 4 February 2002
- President: Kim Dae-jung
- Preceded by: Lee Joung-binn
- Succeeded by: Choi Sung-hong

Chief Presidential Secretary
- In office 23 December 1994 – 21 December 1995
- President: Kim Young-sam
- Preceded by: Park Kwan-yong
- Succeeded by: Kim Kwang-il

South Korean Ambassador to the United States
- In office 23 June 1993 – 23 December 1994
- President: Kim Young-sam
- Preceded by: Hyun Hong-choo
- Succeeded by: Park Kun-woo

Personal details
- Born: 28 December 1936 (age 89) Chuncheon, Korea, Empire of Japan
- Party: Grand National
- Education: Yonsei University (BA); Seoul National University (MPA); University of York (PhD)
- Profession: Economist

Korean name
- Hangul: 한승수
- Hanja: 韓昇洙
- RR: Han Seungsu
- MR: Han Sŭngsu

Art name
- Hangul: 춘강
- Hanja: 春崗
- RR: Chungang
- MR: Ch'un'gang
- Korean royal family (Cheongju Han clan)

Han Seung-soo (Korean: 한승수; born 28 December 1936) is a South Korean politician and diplomat who served as the prime minister of South Korea from 2008 to 2009 under President Lee Myung-bak.

He was the United Nations Secretary-General Ban Ki-moon's Special Envoy on Climate Change (2007–08) and for Disaster Risk Reduction and Water (2013–18), Special Advisor to the UN/World Bank High-Level Panel on Water (2016–18), Member of the UN Secretary-General's Advisory Board on Water and Sanitation Agency (UNSGAB, 2007–15), Member of the UN Secretary-General's High-Level Panel for Global Sustainability (GSP, 2010–12), Founding Chair of Global Green Growth Institute (GGGI, 2010–12), Temasek International Panel Member (2004–18) and Independent Non-Executive Director of Standard Chartered plc (2010–2019).

Han was the President of the 56th Session of the General Assembly of the United Nations (2001–02), South Korea's Minister of Foreign Affairs (2001–02), Deputy Prime Minister and Minister of Finance (1996–97), Chief of Staff to the President Kim Young-sam (1994–95), South Korean Ambassador to the United States (1993–94) and Minister of Trade and Industry (1988–90). He was a three-term Member of National Assembly of the Republic of Korea (1988–1992, 1996–2004) directly elected by the people of his hometown, Chuncheon.

== Education ==
Han was educated at Yonsei University (BA, 1960), Seoul National University (MPA, 1963), and University of York, England (Ph.D., 1968 /D.Univ., 1997). Prior to his entry into politics in 1988, he had a distinguished academic career as Professor of Economics at Seoul National University (1970–88), taught economics and/or did research at the Universities of York (1965–68), Cambridge (Emmanuel College, 1968–70), Harvard (1985–86), Tokyo (1986–87), and GRIPS (2004–06). He has honorary degrees from the Universities of York, Gangwon National, Yonsei, KAIST and Kuala Lumpur.

== Political and diplomatic career ==
Han is currently, among others, Chair of High-Level Experts and Leaders Panel on Water and Disasters (HELP, 2007-), Host of the Biennial UN Special Thematic Session on Water and Disasters (2013-), Chair of the Water Advisory Group of Asia Development Bank (2014-), Vice President of Club de Madrid, Member of the WMO Water and Climate Leaders Panel, and Maureen and Mike Mansfield Foundation International Advisory Board Member, Vice-Chair of Zayed Sustainability Prize Jury, Co-Chair of International Finance Forum (China), Chair of the Jury for IFF Global Green Finance Award, Distinguished Professor at Zhejiang University International Business School, Chief International Advisor of International Monetary Institute (IMI) of Renmin University of China, Senior Advisor to Research Institute of ASEAN Economy (Shaoxing, China), and Founder of GG56 Ltd., a big data and blockchain startup. He was also Chairman of the 2014 PyeongChang Winter Olympic Games bid Committee.

His major international achievements include being one of the initiators of the APEC in 1989 as Minister of Trade and Industry, Korea's accession to the OECD in 1996 when he was the chief minister in charge of negotiations as Deputy Prime Minister and Minister of Finance, the global crisis management in the aftermath of 9/11 as President of the 56th Session of the United Nations General Assembly (the day to be elected was 11 September 2001) when he was Foreign Minister, and the passage of the unanimous resolution of the OECD Ministerial Council Meeting when he was Prime Minister of the Republic of Korea.

== Publications ==
Han has many publications in both Korean and English, the most recent ones being Here for Global Good: Collected Speeches of Han Seung-soo (YBM, Seoul, 2015) which was translated into Chinese and published by Tsinghua University Press in 2016, Beyond the Shadow of 9/11; A Year at the United Nations General Assembly (SAIS, Washington DC, 2007).

== See also ==
- Politics of South Korea

Political offices
Preceded by Lee Jeong-bin	Minister of Foreign Affairs; 2001–2002	Succeeded by Choe Seong-hong
Preceded by Han Duck-soo	Prime Minister of South Korea; 2008–2009	Succeeded by Chung Un-chan
Positions in intergovernmental organisations
Preceded by Harri Holkeri	President of the United Nations General Assembly; 2001–2002	Succeeded by Jan Kavan
