= Choi Young-jin =

South Korean diplomat

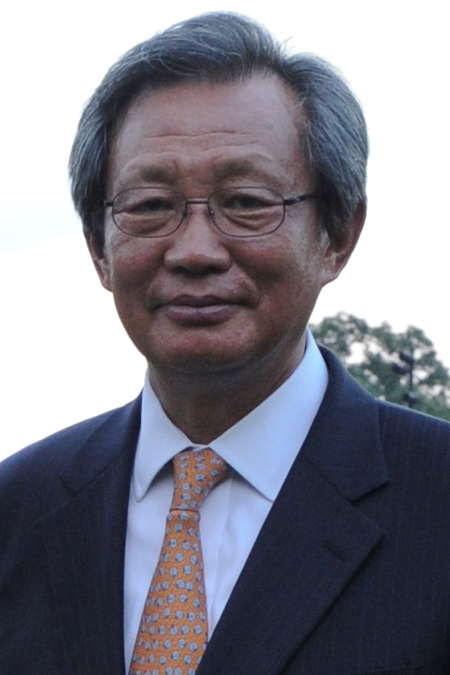
- Choi Young-jin in 2012

South Korean Ambassador to the United States
- In office 8 March 2012 – 28 May 2013
- President: Lee Myung-bak
- Preceded by: Han Duck-soo
- Succeeded by: Ahn Ho-young

Personal details
- Born: 29 March 1948 (age 78) Seoul, South Korea
- Education: Yonsei University; Paris 1 Panthéon-Sorbonne University

Korean name
- Hangul: 최영진
- Hanja: 崔英鎭
- RR: Choe Yeongjin
- MR: Ch'oe Yŏngjin

Choi Young-jin (Korean: 최영진, Choe Yeongjin; born 29 March 1948) is a South Korean career diplomat who served as South Korean Ambassador to the United States from 2012 to 2013, when he was succeeded by Ahn Ho-young.

He is also the former Special Representative of the United Nations Secretary-General for Côte d'Ivoire (UNOCI). He was appointed to the latter position by United Nations Secretary-General Ban Ki-moon in October 2007, as successor of Pierre Schori from Sweden. He has been succeeded by Bert Koenders from the Netherlands in August 2011.

He is currently a distinguished professor at Yonsei University's Graduate School of International Studies.

== Early life and education ==
Choi Young-jin was born on 29 March 1948 in Seoul, South Korea. He obtained his master's and doctorate degrees in international relations from the University of Paris I (Panthéon-Sorbonne), respectively, in 1980 and 1985 and his bachelor's degree with distinction from the Department of International Relations, Yonsei University in 1973. Prior to these studies, Choi had studied medicine at the Severance Medical College in Korea for four years.

== Career ==
A career diplomat, before being appointed Special representative of the Secretary-General for Côte d'Ivoire, Choi has served in various capacities in the foreign service of the Republic of Korea. From 2005 to 2007, he was the Permanent Representative of the Republic of Korea to the United Nations. In 2004, he was the Vice Minister for Foreign Affairs and Trade. In 2003, he served as Chancellor of Institute of Foreign Affairs and National Security (IFANS). Previously, he was Ambassador to Austria and Slovenia, and Permanent Representative to all international organizations in Vienna, Austria. Between 2000 and 2001, he served as Deputy Minister for Policy Planning and International Organizations, in charge of foreign policy planning, North Korean affairs, the United Nations system, disarmament and non-proliferation, and democracy and human rights.

From 1998 to 1999, Choi was Assistant Secretary-General for Peacekeeping Operations at the United Nations, responsible for overseeing planning and support for 17 peacekeeping operations, including those in Kosovo, Timor-Leste, Sierra Leone and the Democratic Republic of the Congo. From 1995 to 1997, Choi was Deputy Executive Director, Korean Peninsula Energy Development Organization (KEDO) in New York City. In this capacity, he oversaw a $5 billion project to construct two light-water nuclear reactors (LWR) in North Korea. He led negotiations within KEDO and with the Democratic People's Republic of Korea (DPRK) to carry out the LWR project, visiting North Korea six times. In addition, he served on several other duties at the Ministry of Foreign Affairs, including as Director-General of the International Economic Affairs Bureau from 1994 to 1995, as First Senior Coordinator in the Ministry's Office of Policy Planning from 1991 to 1993, and as an Economic Counselor at the Korean Embassy in Washington, D.C., from 1988 to 1990.

In 2007, he was a resident diplomat scholar at the Fletcher School of Law and Diplomacy, Tufts University, Boston, Massachusetts.

=== Côte d'Ivoire ===
In his capacity as Special Representative of the Secretary-General for Côte d'Ivoire, Choi was mandated by the United Nations Security Council (resolution 1765 of 16 July 2007) to certify the Ivorian presidential elections, which took place on 31 October 2010 (first round) and 28 November 2010 (second round). His certification was the first ever in Africa and widely recognized as having been instrumental in dissipating the confusion regarding the results of the presidential elections.

During the ensuing post-electoral crisis that lasted about four months from early December 2010 to early April 2011, Choi led the United Nations Operation in Côte d'Ivoire (UNOCI) under trying circumstances as the outgoing president, Laurent Gbagbo, laid a siege to UNOCI Headquarters in Abidjan, after having requested UNOCI to leave the country. UNOCI undertook military operations using Mi-24 armed helicopters to prevent Gbagbo's forces from using heavy weapons against the civilian population, in conformity with United Nations Security Council Resolution 1975 (2011). These air-strikes were the first ever in the history of United Nations Peacekeeping and were also considered as pivotal in bringing about the dénouement of the Ivorian post-electoral crisis several days later.

== Publication ==
- East and West: Understanding the Rise of China, iUniverse (2010) ISBN 1-4502-6542-1

Diplomatic posts
Preceded by Choi S.	Ambassador of Republic of Korea to Austria; 2002–2003	Succeeded by Cho C.
Preceded by Pierre Schori	UN Secretary-General's Special Representative and Head of ONUCI; 2007–2011	Succeeded by Bert Koenders
Preceded by Han Duck-soo	Ambassador of Republic of Korea to United States; 2012–2013	Succeeded by Ahn Ho-young
