= Ahn Ho-young =

South Korean diplomat (born 1956)

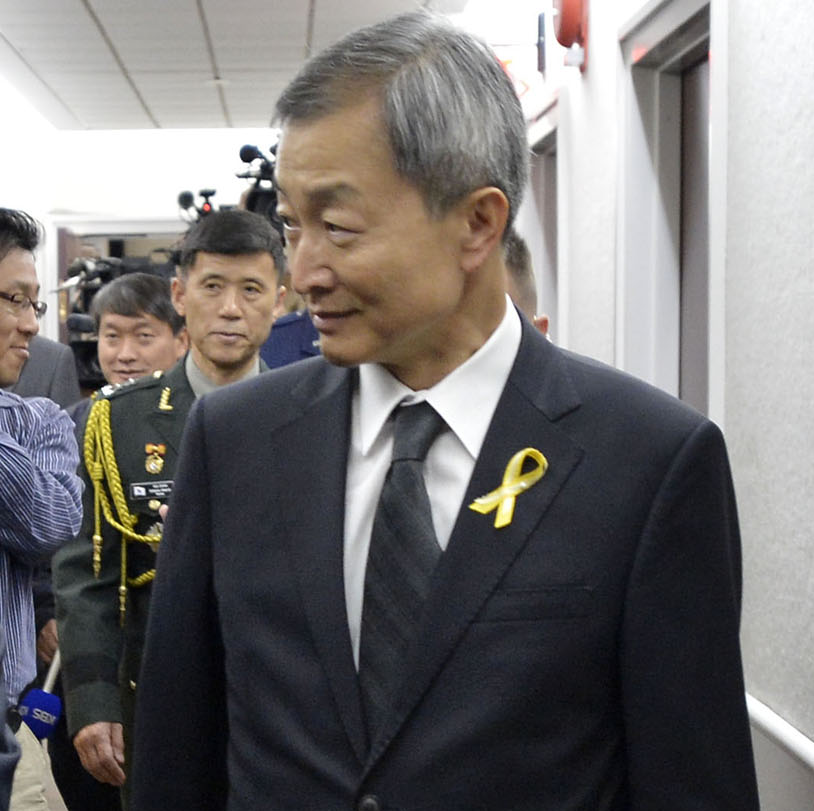
- Ahn at the South Korean embassy in 2014

South Korean Ambassador to the United States
- In office July 2013 – October 2017
- President: Park Geun-hye; Moon Jae-in
- Preceded by: Choi Young-jin
- Succeeded by: Cho Yoon-je

Personal details
- Born: July 5, 1956 (age 69) Pusan, South Korea
- Occupation: Diplomat

Korean name
- Hangul: 안호영
- Hanja: 安豪榮
- RR: An Hoyeong
- MR: An Hoyŏng

Ahn Ho-young (born July 5, 1956) is a South Korean diplomat who was the South Korean ambassador to the United States from 2013 to 2017.

Ahn joined the South Korean Ministry of Foreign Affairs in 1979 after graduating with a political science bachelor's degree from Seoul National University in 1978. His first overseas posting was at the South Korean embassy in New Delhi, India. He built his career on trade issues, including as Director of the South Korean Foreign Ministry's International Trade Law Division, Director General for the Multilateral Trade Bureau, and Deputy Minister for Trade. In March 2011, he became South Korean ambassador to Belgium and the European Union and then First Vice Foreign Minister, the South Korean Foreign Ministry's number-two position, in February 2012.

During a February 2018 visit by U.S. Vice President Mike Pence, the Vice President's aides mistakenly told reporters Ahn would greet the Vice President in his capacity as South Korean ambassador the United States The greeter was Cho Yoon-je, who had succeeded Ahn as ambassador, forcing a correction from the Vice President's office. From 2018, he is working as President of University of North Korean Studies.

== See also ==
- South Korea–United States relations
