= Asian Americans in Maryland =

Total population
- 370,044

Regions with significant populations

Languages
- English, Chinese, Tagalog, Hindustani, Korean, other Languages of Asia

Religion
- Protestantism, Catholicism, Buddhism, Hinduism, Islam, Sikhism, Irreligion, Others

Related ethnic groups
- Asian Americans

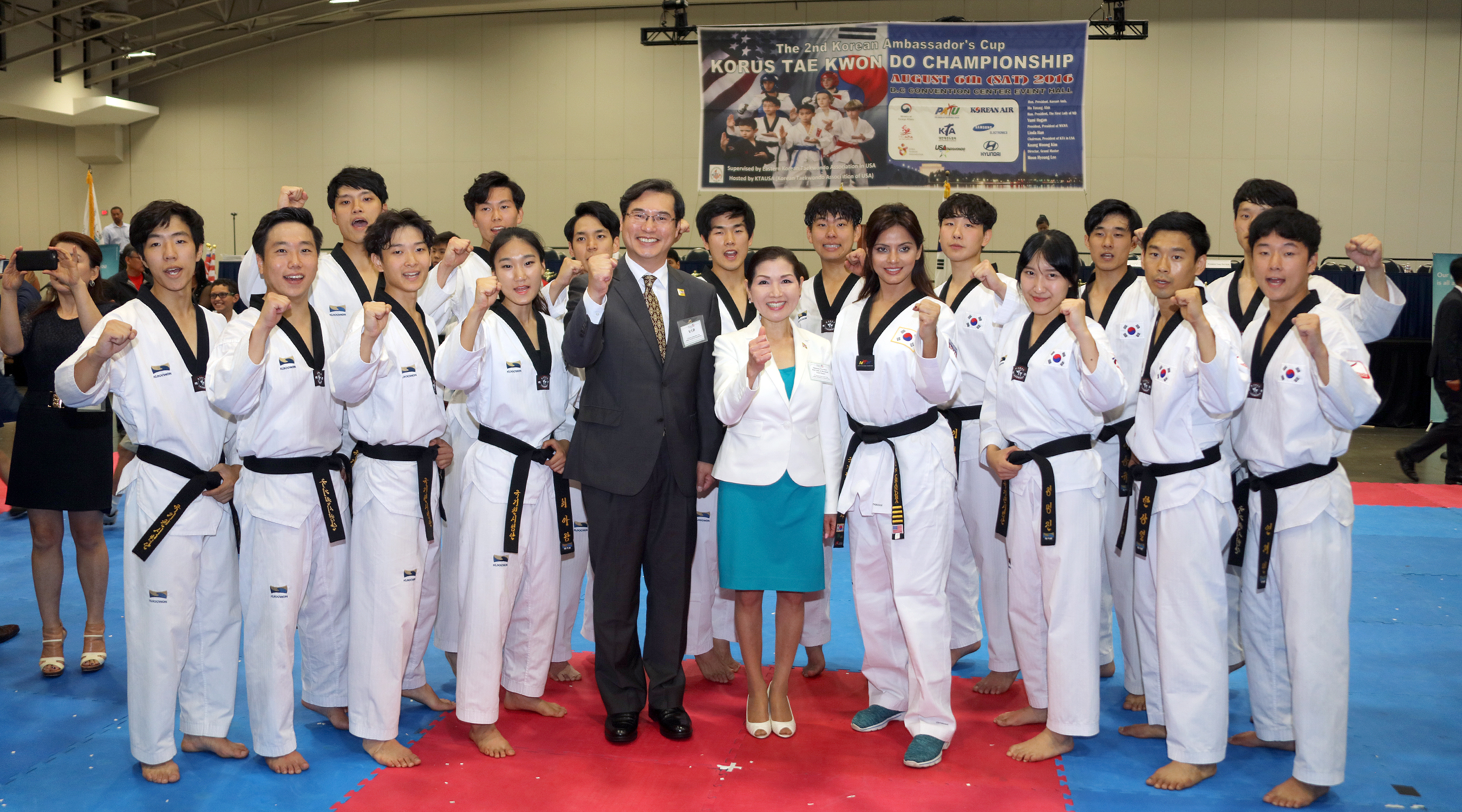
Former Maryland First Lady Yumi Hogan attends the KORUS Cup Championships in 2016.

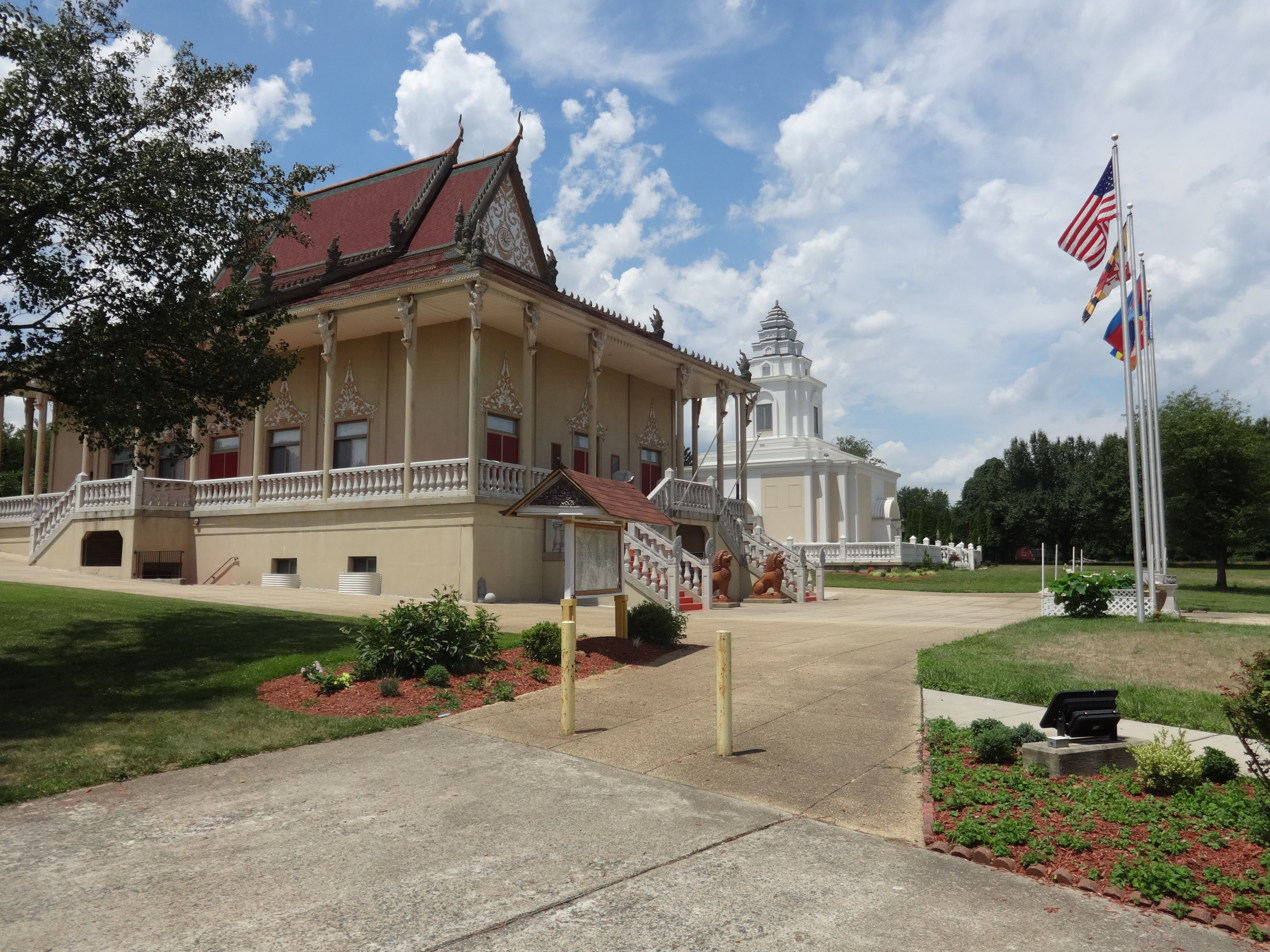
The Cambodian Buddhist Society of Silver Spring, July 2015.

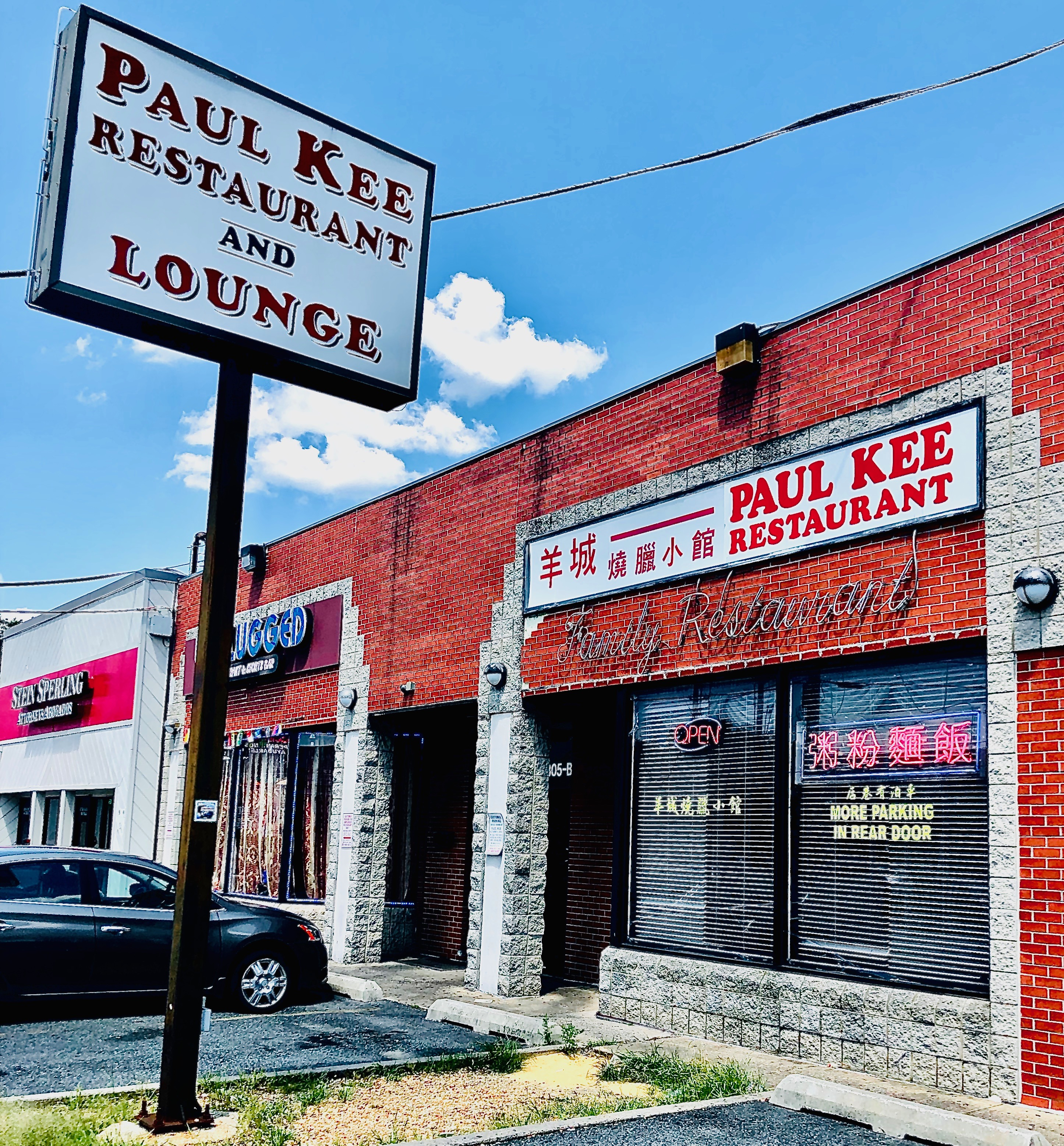
Paul Kee Restaurant in Wheaton

Asian Americans in Maryland are residents of the state of Maryland who are of Asian ancestry. As of the 2010 U.S. Census, Asian-Americans were 6.1% of the state's population. The ten largest Asian-American populations in Maryland are Indians, Chinese, Koreans, Filipinos, Vietnamese, Pakistanis, Japanese, Taiwanese, Thai, and Burmese. There are smaller numbers of Bangladeshis, Nepalis, Cambodians, and Sri Lankans.

== See also ==
- Chinatown, Baltimore
- Filipino Cultural Association
- Greater Washington Area Asian-American demographics
- History of Koreans in Baltimore
- Koreans in Washington, D.C.
- Kunzang Palyul Choling
- Metro Chinese Network
- Murugan Temple of North America
- Sri Siva Vishnu Temple
- Washington Bangla Radio on Internet
- Washington Metropolitan Association of Chinese Schools
