= Central Jersey =

Coordinates: 40.4361°N 74.875°W

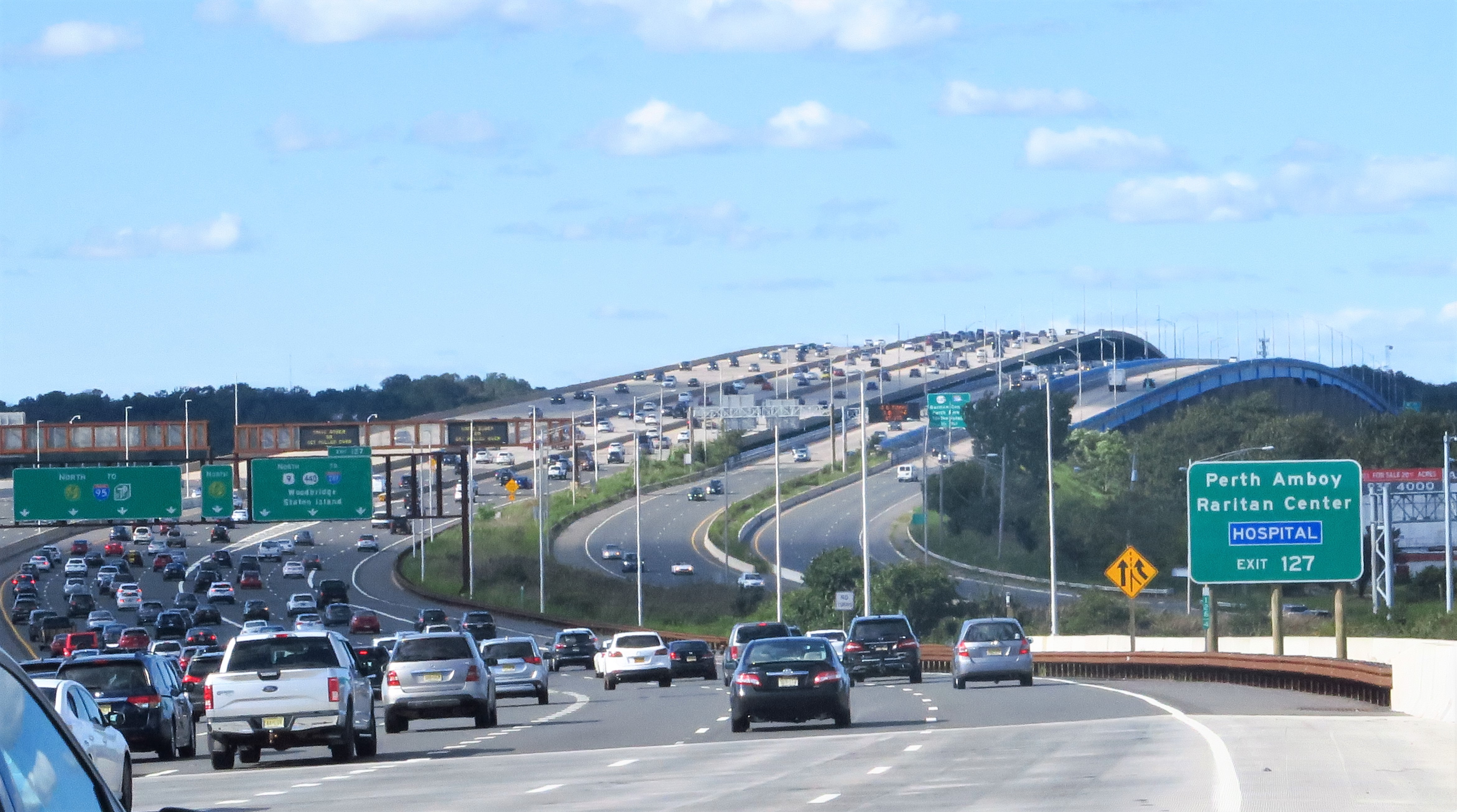
- With 15 travel lanes and six shoulder lanes, Driscoll Bridge on the Garden State Parkway in Central Jersey is the world's widest and one of the busiest motor vehicle bridges. The bridge crosses the Raritan River near Raritan Bay, connecting Sayreville and Woodbridge, both in Middlesex County.
- Interactive map of Central Jersey
- Country: United States
- State: New Jersey
- Largest municipalities by population: Elizabeth; Lakewood; Edison; Woodbridge; Trenton; Franklin Township; Old Bridge; Middletown; Piscataway; New Brunswick; Perth Amboy; Plainfield; Howell

Population (2020)
  - Total: 2,300,155

Central Jersey, or Central New Jersey, is the middle region of the U.S. state of New Jersey. The designation Central Jersey is a distinct administrative toponym. While New Jersey is often divided into North Jersey and South Jersey, many residents recognize Central Jersey as a distinct third entity. As of the 2020 census, Central Jersey has a population of 2,300,155 (when tabulating the counties of Middlesex, Union, Mercer, Somerset and Hunterdon). Broadly speaking, Central Jersey is the fastest-growing region of the State of New Jersey, attributed to consistently robust levels of new housing construction, accompanied by an influx of Indians, Chinese, and Orthodox Jews.

All descriptions of Central Jersey include Middlesex County, the population center of New Jersey, and most include much of nearby Monmouth, Mercer, Somerset, and Hunterdon counties. The inclusion of adjacent Union and Ocean counties on the north and south of the region, respectively, is a source of debate. In 2015, New Jersey Business magazine defined Central Jersey more narrowly as the five counties of Hunterdon, Mercer, Middlesex, Monmouth, and Somerset.

In 2022, legislation was proposed in the New Jersey Legislature to establish distinct geographic areas for tourism in the state. Bill A4711 was sponsored by Assemblymembers Roy Freiman, Sadaf Jaffer, and Anthony Verrelli in the New Jersey General Assembly. This included an official designation of the region of Central Jersey, which the legislation defines more broadly as the seven counties of Hunterdon, Mercer, Middlesex, Monmouth, Ocean, Somerset, and Union. The New Jersey Senate version of this legislation passed by a vote of 36-1 on June 20, 2023. On August 24, 2023, Gov. Murphy signed legislation officially designating Central Jersey including, at a minimum, the counties of Hunterdon, Mercer, Middlesex, and Somerset.

Trenton, the seat of Mercer County and the state capital of New Jersey, is located in Central Jersey. New Jersey's geographic center is in Hamilton, Mercer County. In 2011, the population center of the state was in the western portion of East Brunswick, in Middlesex County. The two busiest highways in New Jersey, the New Jersey Turnpike and the Garden State Parkway, intersect in Woodbridge, Middlesex County. Princeton University and Rutgers University, the two most prominent institutions of higher education in the state, are situated in Central Jersey, partially contributing to the region's status as the world's largest pharmaceutical industry hub.

== Geography ==
The counties of Central Jersey highlighted in green: Middlesex, Monmouth, Mercer, Somerset, and Hunterdon; Union and Ocean counties are sometimes also included within the region's geographic parameters.

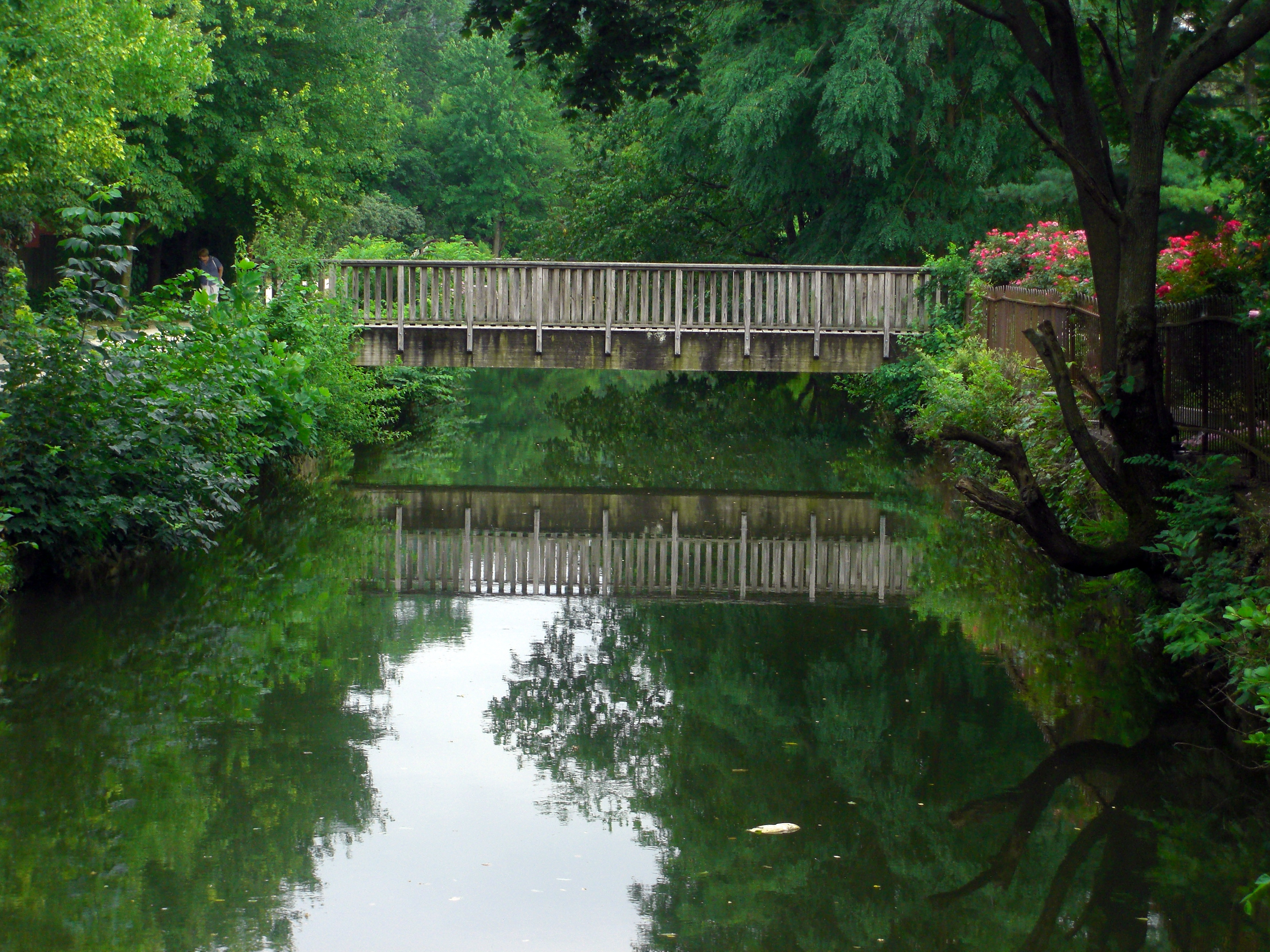
The Delaware and Raritan Canal in Lambertville, connects the Delaware and Raritan rivers in Central Jersey.

The region lies roughly at the geographic heart of the Northeast megalopolis and is wholly in the New York metropolitan area, the nation's largest metropolitan area. All of Central Jersey has a hot-summer humid continental climate (Dfa).

The Philadelphia metropolitan area is another area that is associated with some parts of Central Jersey, specifically Mercer County. Yet despite the County’s close geographic proximity to Philadelphia's combined statistical area, Mercer County is considered part of the New York Combined Metropolitan Statistical Area as defined by the United States Census Bureau. Some but not all regions of Hunterdon County associate themselves with the Philadelphia metropolitan area.

The Raritan Valley is the region along the middle reaches of the Raritan River and its North Branch and South Branch. The Raritan Valley includes the communities of Branchburg, Bridgewater, Somerville, Raritan, Hillsborough, Franklin Township, Green Brook, North Plainfield, Bound Brook, and South Bound Brook, all in Somerset County; Dunellen, Middlesex, Piscataway, South Plainfield, Highland Park, New Brunswick, East Brunswick, Edison, and Metuchen, all in the northern and central portions of Middlesex County; and Plainfield in southwestern Union County.

The Raritan Bayshore is used to describe the region in Middlesex and Monmouth Counties, located along the coastline of the Raritan Bay, from the mouth of the Raritan River in the west to the barrier island of Sandy Hook bordering the Atlantic Ocean in the east. The Raritan Bayshore includes the communities of Sayreville, Woodbridge, Perth Amboy, South Amboy, and Old Bridge, all in northeastern Middlesex County; Aberdeen, Matawan, Keyport, Union Beach, Hazlet, Keansburg, Holmdel, Middletown, Atlantic Highlands, and Highlands, all in northern Monmouth County.

The telephone area codes 732 and 848 includes Middlesex, Monmouth, Somerset, Union, and northern Ocean counties. While area codes 609 and 640 includes southern Ocean, Hunterdon, and Somerset counties, as well as Mercer County.

== Colonial era ==
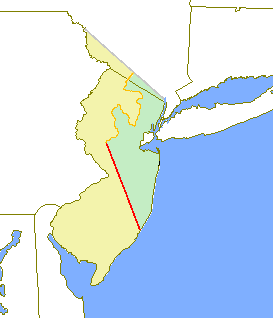
The since discarded regions of West New Jersey (in yellow) and East New Jersey (in green) that existed from 1674 to 1702 during the colonial era of New Jersey; the map also indicates location of the Keith Line (in red) and the Coxe and Barclay Line (in orange).

Between 1674 and 1702, in the early part of New Jersey's colonial period, the border between West Jersey and East Jersey ran diagonally across the middle part of the state. The Keith Line, as the demarcation is known, ran through the center of what is now Mercer County. This border remained important in determining ownership and political boundaries until 1745. Remnants of that division are seen today, notably as the Hunterdon-Somerset, Ocean-Burlington, and Monmouth-Burlington county lines. The division of the two provinces was cultural as well as geographical.

New Jersey's position between the cities of New York and Philadelphia led to the saying that the state was like "a barrel tapped at both ends", a quote often attributed to Benjamin Franklin. Travel between the two cities originally included a ferry crossing. Due to the obstacles created by the Meadowlands and the Hudson Palisades, passengers from New York would cross the North River and the Upper New York Bay by boat and then transfer to stagecoaches to travel overland through what is now Central Jersey. One route from Elizabethtown to Lambertville was known as Old York Road. Another route, from Perth Amboy through Kingston to Burlington, ran along a portion of the Kings Highway, These roads followed Lenape paths known respectively as the Naritcong Trail and the Assunpink Trail.

Raritan Landing, across from New Brunswick in today's Piscataway, became an important inland port and commercial hub for the region. Two of the nine Colonial Colleges, founded before the American Revolution, were the College of New Jersey (now Princeton University), and Queens College (now Rutgers University).

== Population ==
Municipalities with over 30,000 population
2017 Rank	Municipality	County	Population in 2017	Population in 2010	Municipal Type
1	Elizabeth	Union	130,215	124,969	City
2	Lakewood Township	Ocean	102,682	92,843	Township
3	Edison	Middlesex	102,450	99,967	Township
4	Woodbridge Township	Middlesex	101,965	99,585	Township
5	Toms River	Ocean	93,017	91,239	Township
6	Hamilton Township	Mercer	89,078	88,464	Township
7	Trenton	Mercer	84,964	84,913	City
8	Brick Township	Ocean	75,516	75,072	Township
9	Old Bridge Township	Middlesex	67,032	65,375	Township
10	Franklin Township	Somerset	66,734	62,300	Township
11	Middletown Township	Monmouth	65,603	66,522	Township
12	Piscataway	Middlesex	57,887	56,044	Township
13	New Brunswick	Middlesex	57,073	55,181	City
14	Jackson Township	Ocean	57,073	54,856	Township
15	Perth Amboy	Middlesex	52,823	50,814	City
16	Howell Township	Monmouth	52,476	51,075	Township
17	Plainfield	Union	51,327	49,908	City
18	East Brunswick	Middlesex	48,840	47,512	Township
19	South Brunswick	Middlesex	46,561	43,417	Township
20	Bridgewater Township	Somerset	45,414	44,464	Township
21	Monroe Township	Middlesex	45,332	39,132	Township
22	Sayreville	Middlesex	45,325	42,704	Borough
23	Manchester Township	Ocean	43,495	43,070	Township
24	Linden	Union	43,056	40,499	City
25	North Brunswick	Middlesex	42,641	40,742	Township
26	Berkeley Township	Ocean	41,747	41,255	Township
27	Marlboro Township	Monmouth	40,306	40,191	Township
28	Manalapan Township	Monmouth	40,013	38,872	Township
29	Hillsborough Township	Somerset	40,003	38,303	Township
30	Ewing Township	Mercer	36,549	35,790	Township
31	Freehold Township	Monmouth	35,053	36,184	Township
32	Lawrence Township	Mercer	33,161	33,472	Township
33	Long Branch	Monmouth	30,762	30,719	City
34	Westfield	Union	30,433	30,316	Town
35	Lacey Township	Ocean	30,131	27,346	Township

County Population
Rank	County	Population	County Seat	Area
1	Middlesex	829,685	New Brunswick	311 sq mi (805 km^{2})
2	Monmouth	621,354	Freehold Borough	472 sq mi (1,222 km^{2})
3	Mercer	369,811	Trenton	226 sq mi (585 km^{2})
4	Somerset	331,164	Somerville	305 sq mi (790 km^{2})
5	Hunterdon	124,714	Flemington	430 sq mi (1,114 km^{2})

=== Asian American population ===
==== Asian Indian population ====
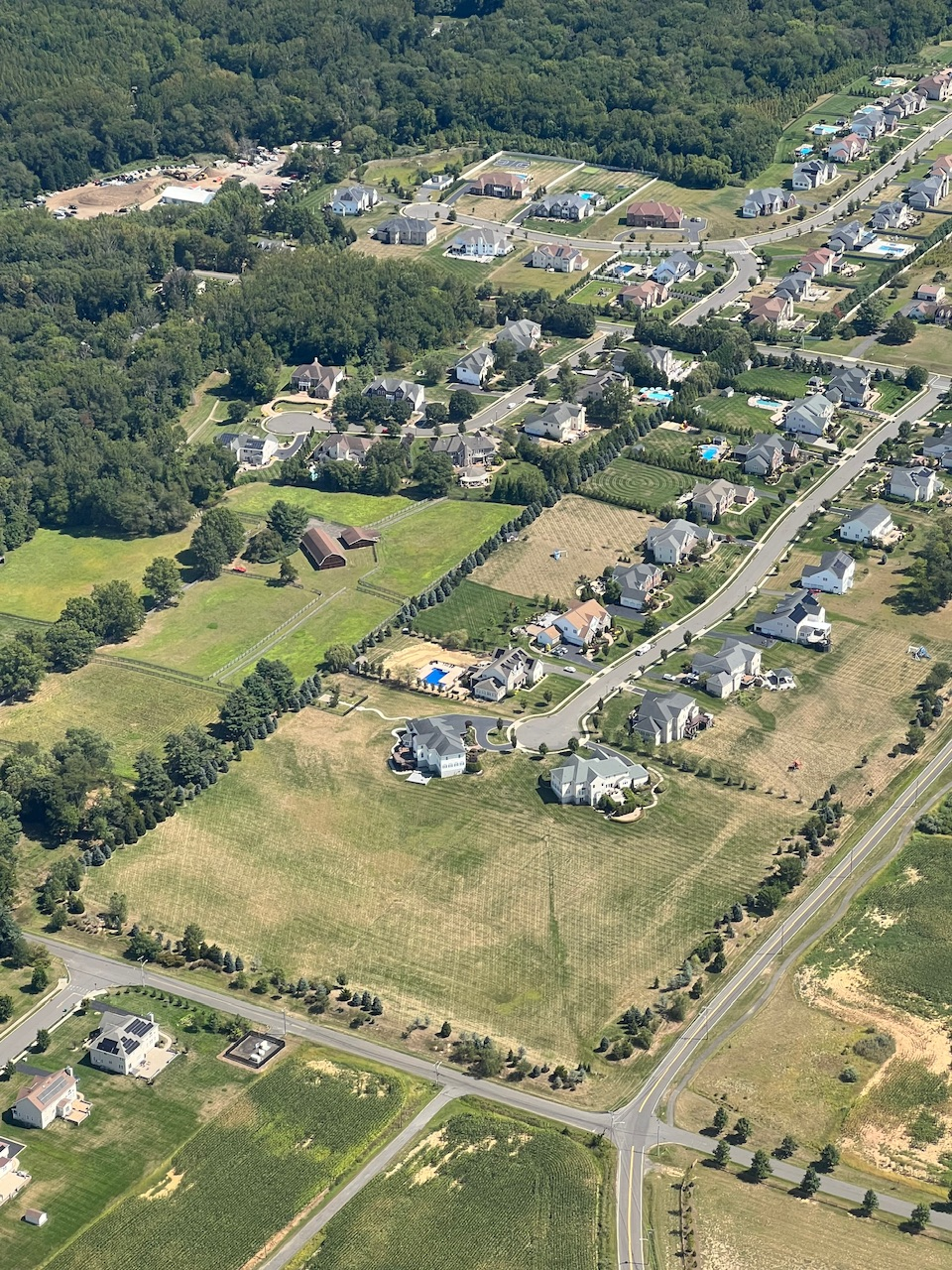
Aerial view of some of the numerous housing tracts of Monroe Township, Middlesex County, New Jersey. Significant new housing construction is rendering an increasingly affluent and suburban environment to Monroe Township, while maintaining the proximity to both New York City and top-ranked Princeton University sought by Indians in this township and the surrounding India corridor of central New Jersey, with the fastest-growing Indian population in the Western Hemisphere.

Central New Jersey, particularly Edison and surrounding Middlesex County, is prominently known for its significant concentration of Asian Indians. The world's largest Hindu temple outside Asia was inaugurated in Robbinsville in 2014, a BAPS temple. The growing Little India is a South Asian-focused commercial strip in Middlesex County, the U.S. county with the highest concentration of Asian Indians, at nearly 20% as of 2020. The Oak Tree Road strip runs for about one-and-a-half miles through Edison and neighboring Iselin in Woodbridge Township, near the area's sprawling Chinatown and Koreatown, running along New Jersey Route 27. It is the largest and most diverse South Asian cultural hub in the United States. Monroe Township (nicknamed Edison South), in Middlesex County, has experienced a particularly rapid growth rate in its Indian American population, with an estimated 5,943 (13.6%) as of 2017, which was 23 times the 256 (0.9%) counted as of the 2000 Census; and Diwali is celebrated by the township as a Hindu holiday. Carteret's Punjabi Sikh community, variously estimated at upwards of 3,000, constitutes the largest concentration of Sikhs in the state. In Middlesex County, election ballots are printed in English, Spanish, Gujarati, Hindi, and Punjabi.

Indian pharmaceutical and technology companies are coming to Central New Jersey to gain a foothold in the United States. Dr. Reddy's Laboratories, based in Hyderabad, set up its U.S. headquarters in Princeton, Mercer County. Pharmaceutical company Aurobindo, also headquartered in Hyderabad, has established its U.S. headquarters in East Windsor, Mercer County, and has implemented a multimillion-dollar expansion of these Central New Jersey operations. In March 2023, Bengaluru-based technology services and consulting company Wipro opened its American international headquarters in East Brunswick, Middlesex, County. In July 2025, Biocon Biologics established its U.S. headquarters in Bridgewater, Somerset County.

==== Chinese population ====
Starting in the 2000s, highly educated suburbs in central and northern New Jersey have received a large influx of Chinese immigrants, including many Taiwanese immigrants. Many Chinese American families send their children to Mandarin language schools in Edison. Some of these private schools include Edison Chinese School, located at John Adams Middle School, or Tzu Chi, located at Woodrow Wilson Middle School, both of which teach in Traditional Chinese, in addition to Huaxia Chinese School, which teaches in Simplified Chinese.

The Taiwanese airline China Airlines provides private bus service to John F. Kennedy International Airport from the Kam Man Food location in Edison to feed its flight to Taipei, Taiwan.

==== Korean population ====
Central Jersey is also home to a large Korean-American population. In 2010, an H Mart opened in Edison, Middlesex County. and in 2017, Woo-Ri Mart opened in West Windsor, Mercer County. The area is also home to several Korean churches, including, in Somerset County, Praise Presbyterian Church (찬양교회) in Somerset, Bountiful United Methodist Church (가득한교회) in Martinsville, and Presbyterian Church (세빛교회) in Warren; and Princeton Korean Community Church and Princeton Korean Presbyterian Church (프린스톤한인장로교회), both in Princeton, Mercer County. KPOT Korean BBQ, founded in 2018 and with over 100 branches across the United States, is headquartered in East Brunswick, Middlesex County.

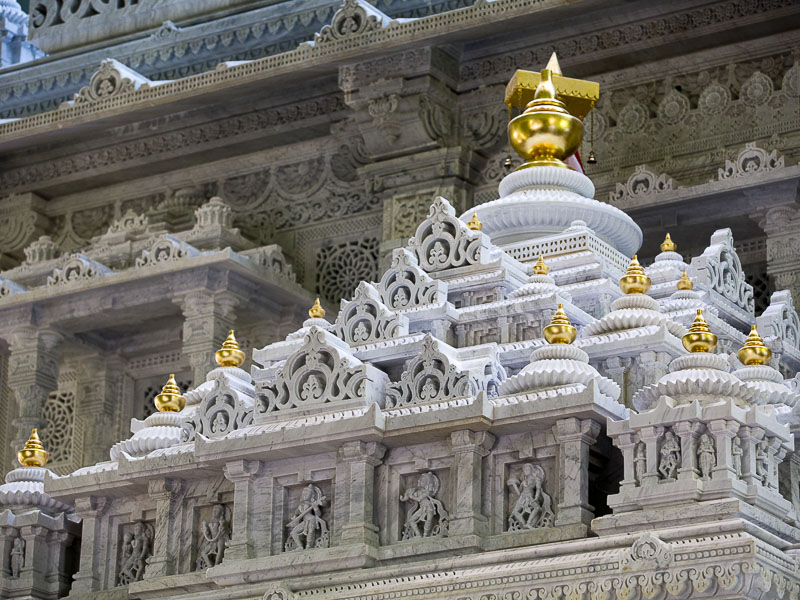
Swaminarayan Akshardham (Devanagari: स्वामिनारायण अक्षरधाम) in Robbinsville, Mercer County, is the world's largest Hindu temple outside Asia, left.

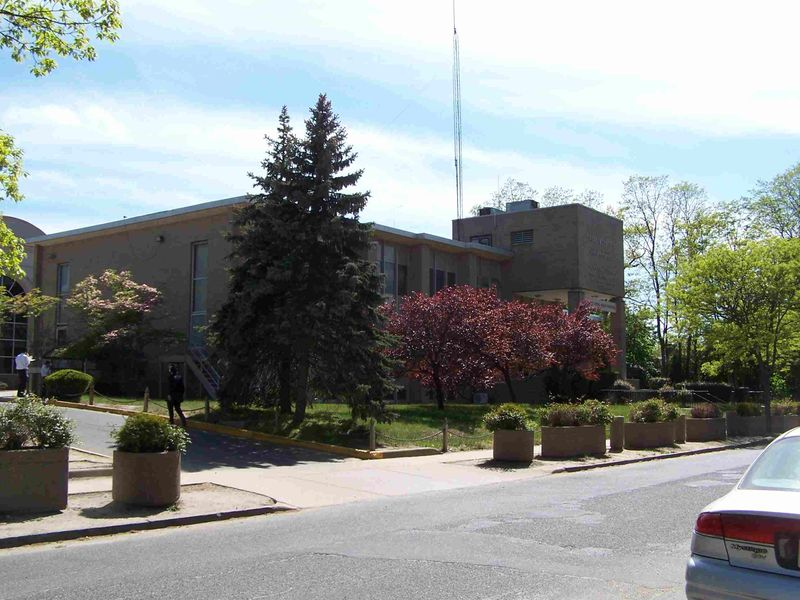
Beth Medrash Govoha (Hebrew: בית מדרש גבוה), in Lakewood Township, Ocean County, is the world's largest yeshiva outside the State of Israel, right. Asian Indians and Orthodox Jews constitute the fastest-growing segments of New Jersey's population, and both are highly represented in central New Jersey.

=== Jewish community ===
Central Jersey is also home to the fastest-growing Jewish community in the U.S., especially Orthodox. Beth Medrash Govoha (Hebrew: בית מדרש גבוה), in Lakewood Township, Ocean County, is the world's largest yeshiva outside the State of Israel. The world's largest Jewish gathering outside of Israel occurred in Edison, Middlesex County on December 1, 2024.

== Economy ==
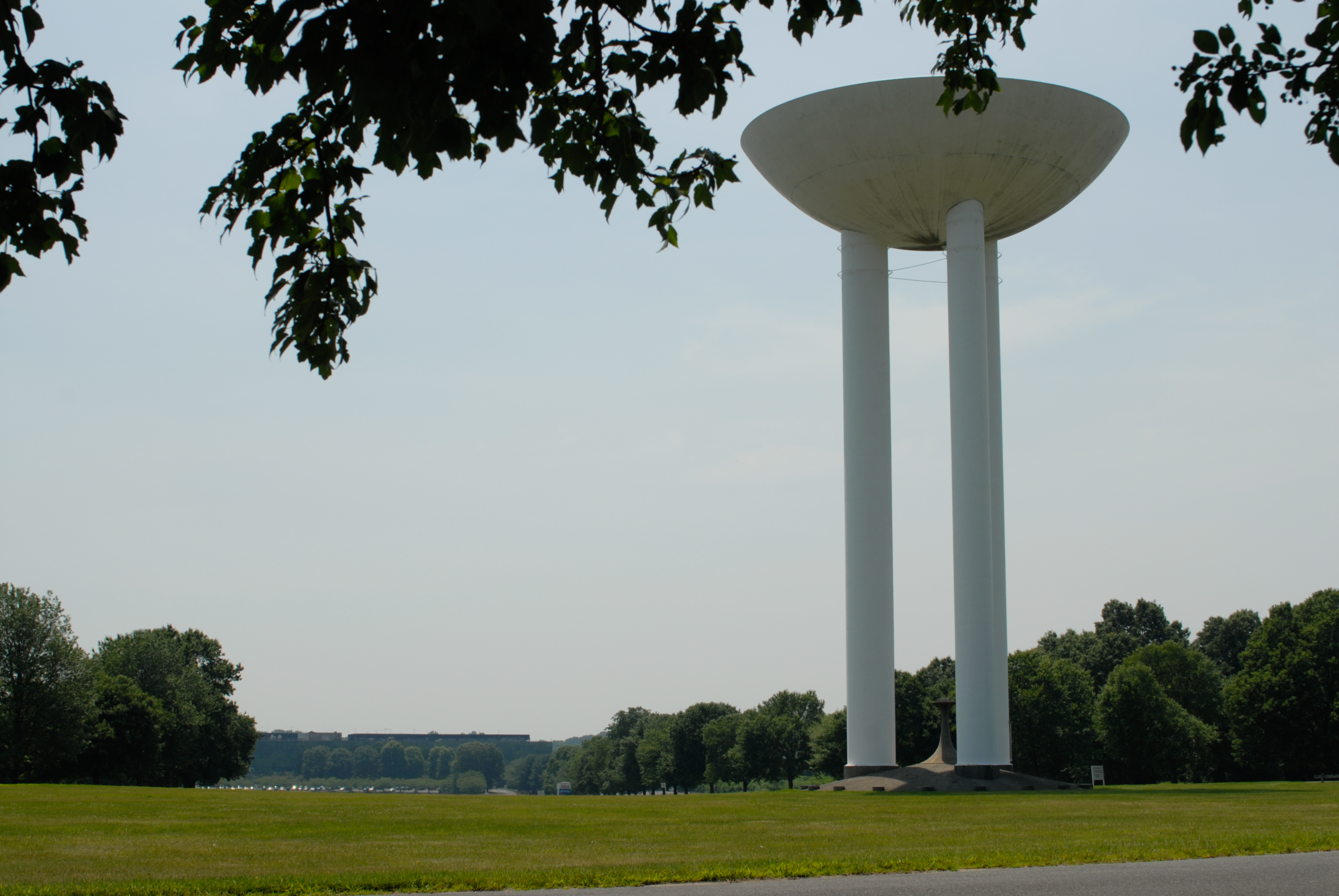
The Bell Labs water tower in Holmdel was designed to resemble a transistor. Telecommunications remains an important industry in Central Jersey.

All of the region's counties are ranked among the highest income counties in the United States, as measured by median household income. Central New Jersey has been called the state's "wealth belt".

=== Manufacturing ===
For decades, Central Jersey was a hub for manufacturing in the eastern United States. Many industrial companies had major production facilities in and around the area, including Edison Assembly, Ford Motor Company's production plant for Rangers, Mustangs, Pintos, Mercurys, and Lincolns. Other notable companies include General Motors in Linden, Frigidaire's air-conditioner plant in Edison, Hess Corporation in Woodbridge, Siemens in Edison, and ExxonMobil Chemical.

Starting in the 2000s, manufacturing began to leave Central Jersey, and many facilities had closed and moved overseas.

=== Telecommunications and high technology ===
The Bell Labs Holmdel Complex has been the site of many innovations in telecommunications and is also a business incubator for high-tech startup companies. Today Verizon Wireless, AT&T Communications, Vonage, Avaya, and Bell Labs are located in the region.

=== Healthcare and pharmaceuticals ===
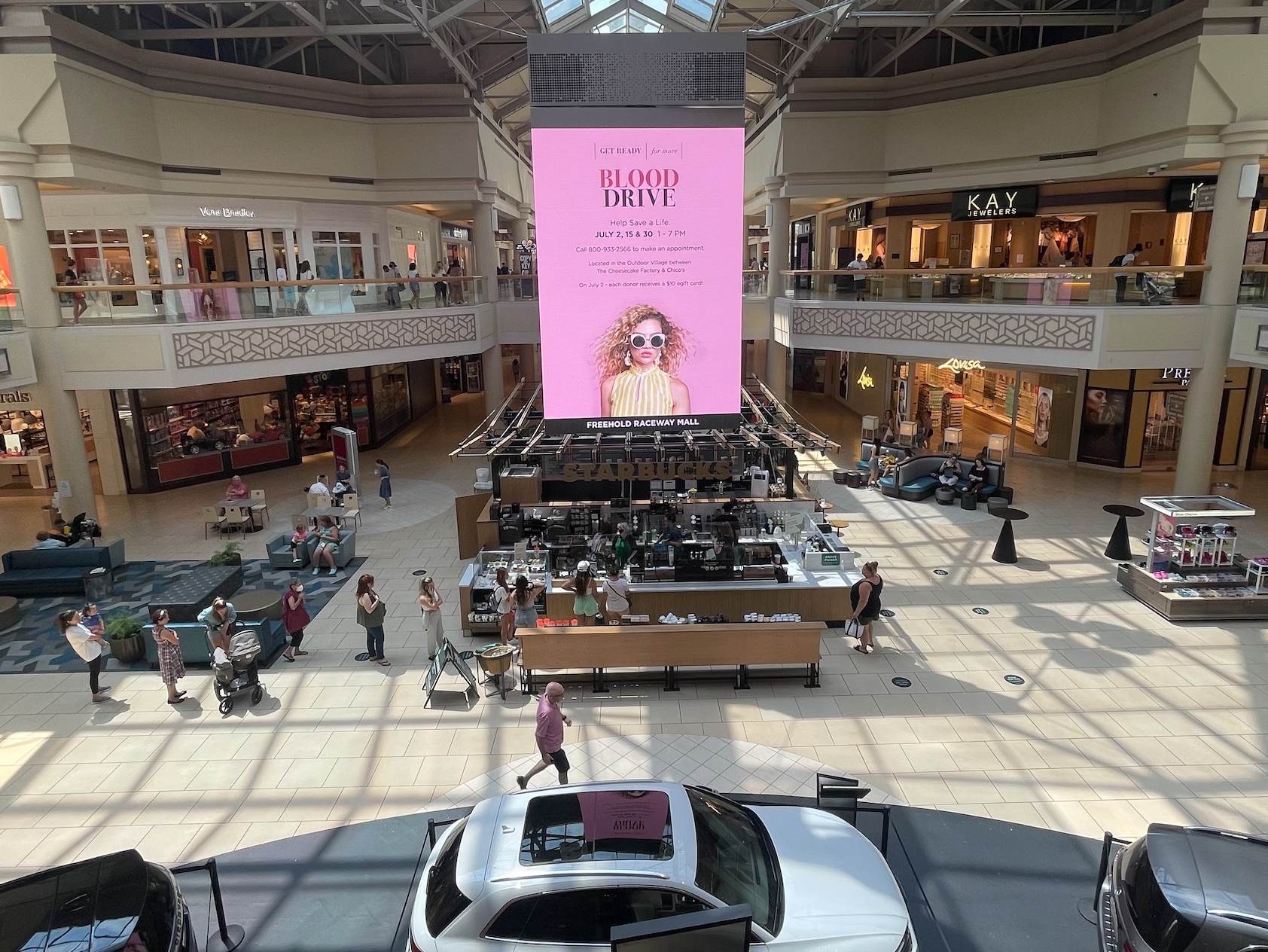
Freehold Raceway Mall in Freehold Township, with a gross leasable area of 1,671,000 sq ft (155,200 m^{2}), is the third largest shopping mall in the state.

Central New Jersey is a global leader in the pharmaceuticals industry. New Brunswick is known as "the Healthcare City", due to the concentration of medical facilities in Central Jersey, including Robert Wood Johnson University Hospital and Saint Peter's University Hospital, as well as the University of Medicine and Dentistry of New Jersey (UMDNJ)-Robert Wood Johnson Medical School. University Medical Center of Princeton is located in Plainsboro. The campuses of the major pharmaceutical corporations Bristol-Myers Squibb Company, Johnson & Johnson, Merck and Sanofi-Aventis are located in the region, as are major operations of Dr. Reddy's Laboratories and Aurobindo Pharma. Princeton University's Frist Campus Center^{[a]} is used for the aerial views of Princeton‑Plainsboro Teaching Hospital seen in the television series House.

=== Shopping malls ===
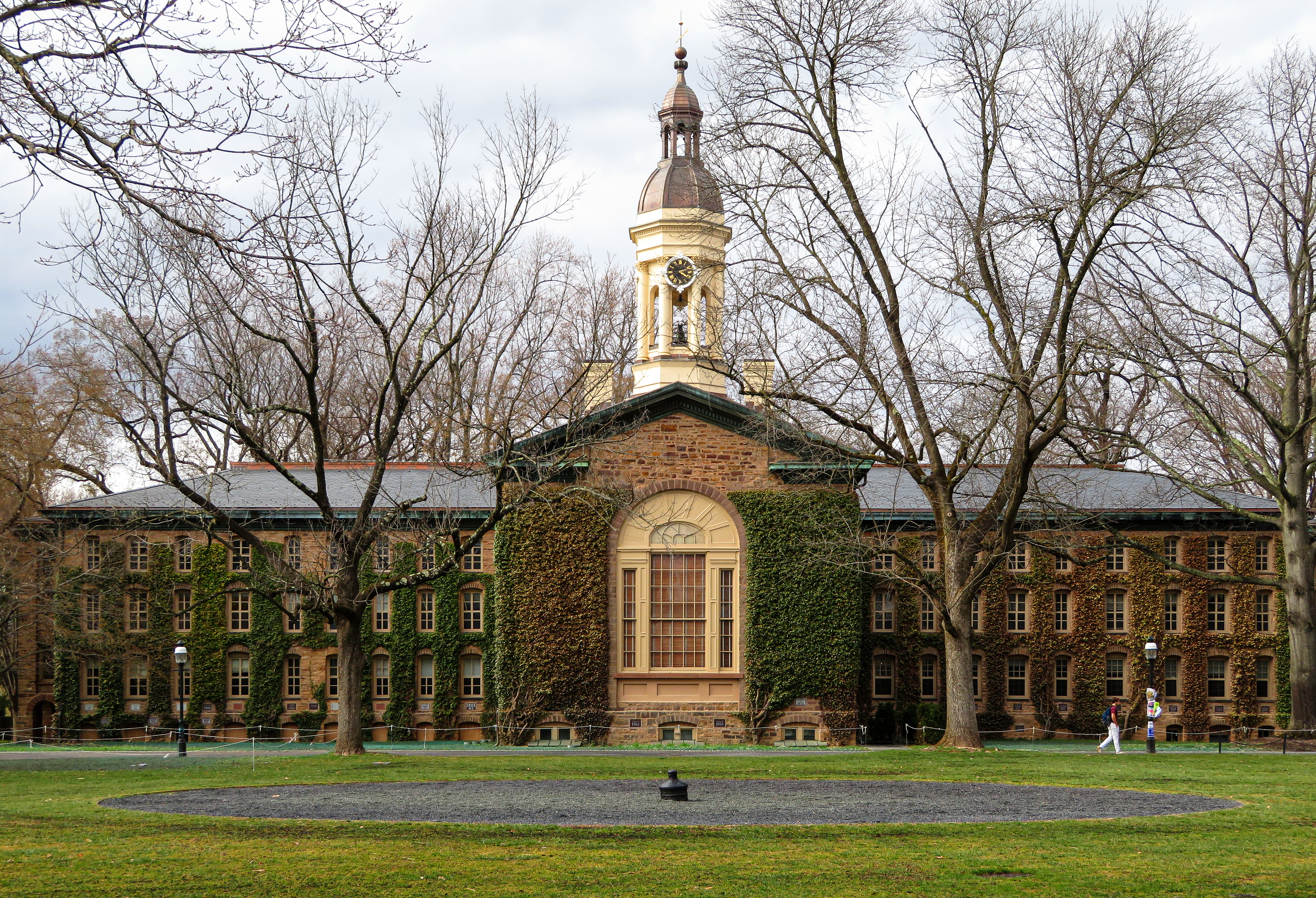
Nassau Hall, the oldest building at Princeton University in Princeton, was the largest academic building in the American colonies when it was built in 1756 and briefly served as the U.S. Capitol in 1783.

Major shopping centers include the Freehold Raceway Mall, Woodbridge Center, Menlo Park Mall, Bridgewater Commons, The Grove at Shrewsbury, Monmouth Mall, Brunswick Square Mall, Forrestal Village, Quaker Bridge Mall, Princeton Market Fair, Ocean County Mall, Jackson Premium Outlets, and Jersey Shore Premium Outlets.

=== Academia ===
Princeton University in Princeton is one of eight Ivy League universities and the nation, one of the world's most prominent research universities, and consistently ranked as one of the best universities in the world; in the 2023-24 issue of U.S. News & World Report Best Colleges Ranking, Princeton University is ranked the best university in the nation. Rutgers-New Brunswick is the flagship university campus of the state of New Jersey. Beth Medrash Govoha, the largest Yeshiva in the western hemisphere, is located in Lakewood in Ocean County. As of 2019, it had 6,715 students, 2,748 regular and 3,967 in Kollel status. Monmouth University, Rider University, and The College of New Jersey are located in Central Jersey as well. Each county maintains its own county college, with the exception of Hunterdon County - whose residents may attend either Raritan Valley Community College (located in Somerset County) or Mercer County Community College (located in Mercer County) at no additional cost. Monmouth County's residents have the choice of attending Brookdale Community College which was recently listed as one of the top three community colleges in the state. Thomas Edison State College in Trenton provides extensive on-line and adult education. Kean University is in Union County.

=== Tourism and cultural attractions ===
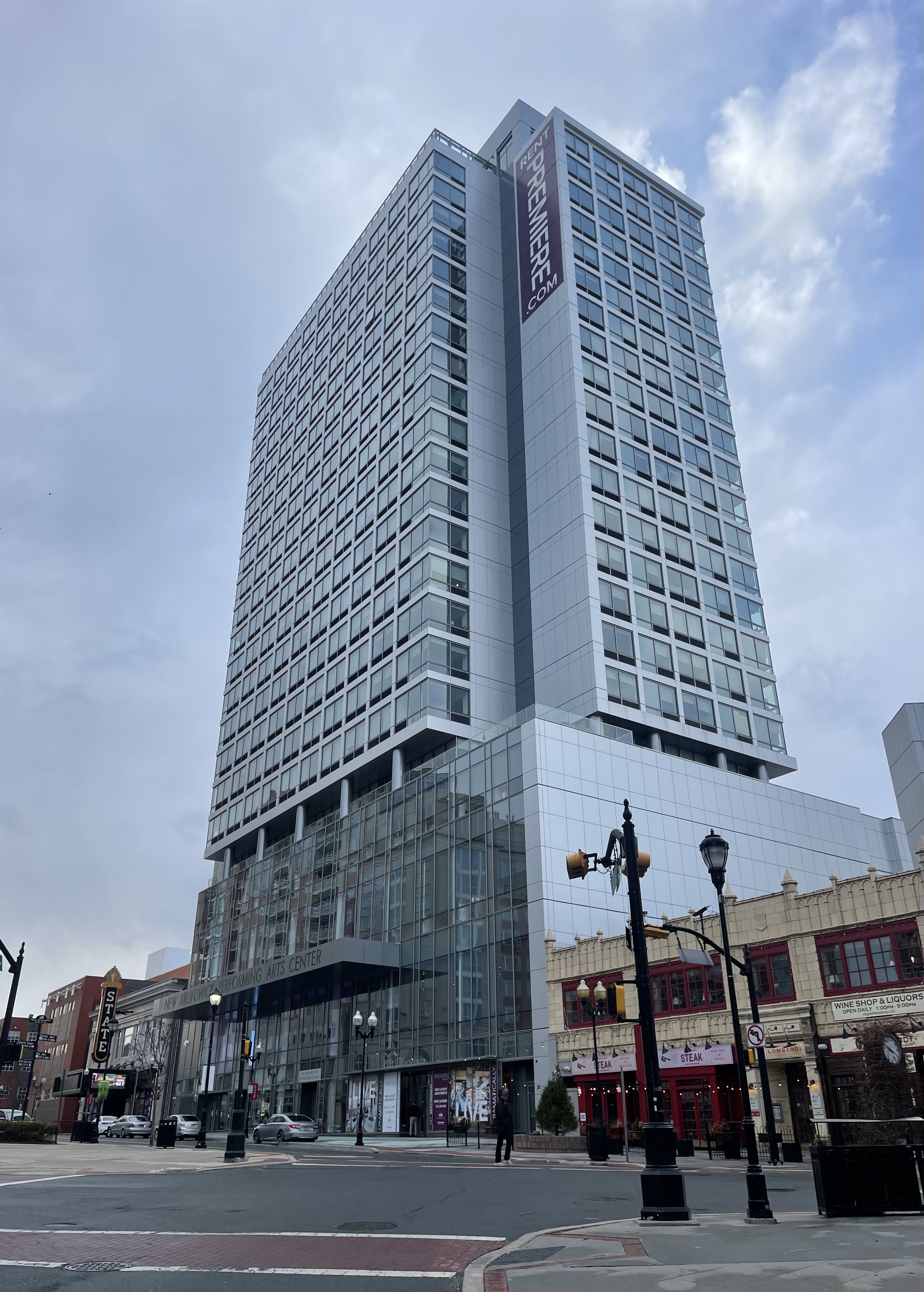
New Brunswick, home to Rutgers University in Central Jersey

Popular tourist attractions in Central New Jersey include Six Flags Great Adventure, Gateway National Recreation Area, Monmouth Park Racetrack, Freehold Raceway, and the many boardwalks along the northern Jersey Shore, in Monmouth County and northern Ocean County.

Six Flags Great Adventure in Jackson is the second-largest theme park in the world after Disney's Animal Kingdom in Central Florida. It is home to many famous rollercoasters, most notably being the Kingda Ka which, as of 2023, is the tallest roller coaster in the world.

The New Brunswick music scene has produced many successful indie bands. The city also is home to the New Jersey Folk Festival. In an early era, the Stone Pony and Asbury Park Convention Hall were important venues on the rock scene. Major music and theater venues in the region include PNC Bank Arts Center, the Trenton War Memorial, CURE Insurance Arena, the McCarter Theater, the Count Basie Theater, the George Street Playhouse and the Starland Ballroom.

East Jersey Olde Towne Village, the Road Up Raritan Historic District as well as those in Trenton, Lawrence, and Princeton recall the colonial era. The region saw a lot of action during the American Revolution due to the region's strategic importance between Philadelphia and New York City. As such, many important battles took place here. These battle sites have been converted into state parks, offering historic preservation of the important structures contingent to their respected battles. State parks include Washington Crossing State Park, Princeton Battlefield State Park, and Monmouth Battlefield State Park. The Middlebrook encampment in Bridgewater was where the first official flag of the United States was unfurled, after a law to adopt a national flag had been passed by Congress on June 14, 1777. Ocean Grove is one of the largest national historic sites in the United States.

== Media markets and national sports ==
Depending on the location, different parts of Central Jersey fall into overlapping spheres of influence from New York media market and Philadelphia media market. Mercer County is located in the Philadelphia television market, while the rest of the region belongs wholly to the New York City market.

The Star-Ledger, based in Newark, is the largest circulated newspaper in New Jersey. Four Central Jersey newspapers, Asbury Park Press, Home News Tribune, and two Trenton dailies, The Trentonian and The Times and several local papers are published in Central Jersey. New Jersey On-Line, MyCentralJersey.com and CentralJersey.com are online news services. During statewide political events like Gubernatorial or Senatorial election debates often held in Trenton, partner stations from both the New York and Philadelphia markets pool resources together to co-host the events and bring them to New Jersey homes.

Identification with sports teams is also affected by the region's location, and it is not uncommon to find fans of major sports teams of either city. For example, while residents of northern New Jersey root for New York teams, those in the southern part of the state root for Philadelphia teams. The distinction is less clear in Central Jersey. Central Jersey Riptide was a short-lived professional soccer club.

== Transportation ==
Interstate 195, which travels from the state capital of Trenton to the Jersey Shore, is sometimes referred to as the Central Jersey Expressway.

The New Jersey Department of Transportation (NJDOT) operates three divisions in the state: North, South, and Central, which encompasses Hunterdon, Mercer, Middlesex, Monmouth, Ocean, and Somerset counties and portions of Warren County. (Routes 22, 122, 173, 78 and including south of Route 57). Apart from Mercer County, which comes under the auspices of the Delaware Valley Regional Planning Commission, all counties in the region are part of the North Jersey Transportation Planning Authority, a government partner which approves transportation projects for the state.

The United New Jersey Railroad and Canal Company traversed the region in 1830, eventually becoming the Pennsylvania Railroad (PRR). NJT's Northeast Corridor Line and the North Jersey Coast were once part of the PRR, as was Amtrak which serves the commuter hub at Metropark, New Brunswick, and the Trenton Transit Center. The Central Railroad of New Jersey once connected Jersey City (with connecting ferries to Manhattan) and many Central Jersey towns. Much of that system is now included in New Jersey Transit rail operations to the Raritan Valley. New Brunswick is known as the Hub City, and at one time was a regional transportation hub for streetcars which converged in the city. The Monmouth Ocean Middlesex Line has been proposed for the region.

The Garden State Parkway, New Jersey Turnpike (I-95), I-287, US 1, US 9, Route 18, and Route 35 are major automobile routes through Central Jersey that pass over the Raritan River at Perth Amboy and New Brunswick. I-195 travels through Central Jersey (hence the name "Central Jersey Expressway") from the Trenton area towards Belmar. New Jersey Route 33 travels between Trenton and Asbury Park.

From the Raritan Bayshore, SeaStreak catamarans travel to Pier 11 at Wall Street and East 34th Street Ferry Landing. NY Waterway ferries travel to Paulus Hook Ferry Terminal in Jersey City, Battery Park City Ferry Terminal, and West Midtown Ferry Terminal. As of 2018, there are plans to create ferry service from Carteret in Middlesex County.

Trenton-Mercer Airport is the only airport in Central New Jersey providing long-distance commercial service. Monmouth Executive Airport, formerly known as Allaire Airport, is a public-use airport located near Allaire State Park. Central Jersey Regional Airport is a privately owned, public airport in Somerset County. Linden Airport is a small general aviation airport located along U.S. Route 1&9 in Union County.

The Route 9 BBS, the New Brunswick BRT, and the Central Jersey Route 1 Corridor are projects in the region intended to expand the use of bus rapid transit in New Jersey.

== See also ==
- North Jersey
- South Jersey
