= History of Koreans in Baltimore =

The history of Koreans in Baltimore dates back to the mid-20th century. The Korean-American community in Baltimore began to grow in the 1960s and reached its peak between the 1970s and 1990s. The Korean population is anchored in central Baltimore, particularly the neighborhoods of Station North and Charles Village, a portion of which has a historic Koreatown. Since the 1990s, the Korean-American population has decreased due to suburbanization, with many Korean-Americans settling in nearby Howard County.

== Demographics ==
The Korean American community in Baltimore, Maryland numbered 1,990 as of 2010, making up 0.3% of Baltimore's population. At 93,000 people, the Baltimore–Washington metropolitan area has the third largest Korean American population in the United States. The Baltimore metropolitan area is home to 35,000 Koreans, many of whom live in suburban Howard County, particularly Columbia and Ellicott City. As of 2000, the Korean language is spoken at home by 3,970 people in Baltimore.

== History ==
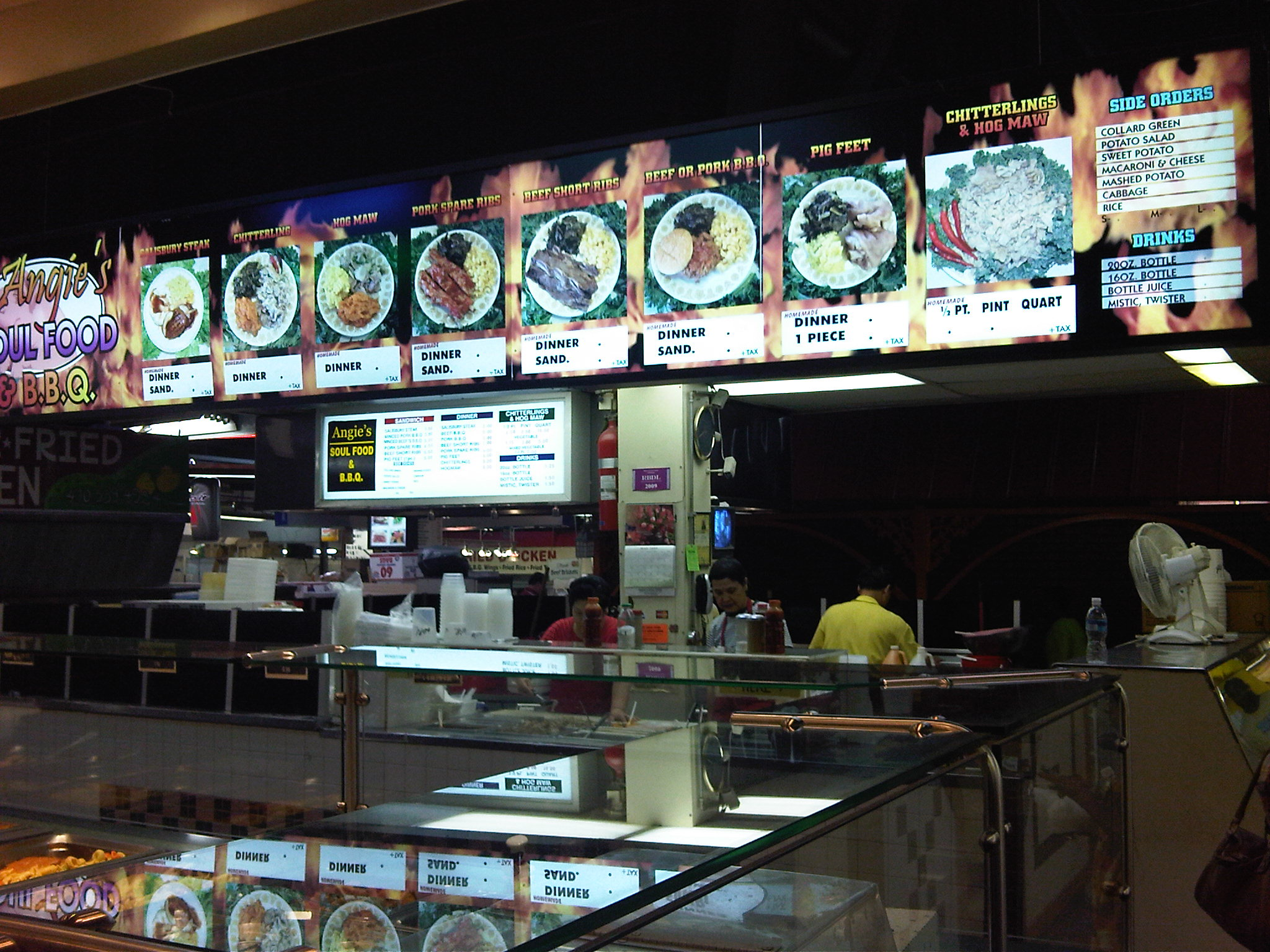
Korean-American food stalls at Lexington Market, May 2009

The Korean-American population in Baltimore first exceeded 100 people in the 1960s. Prior to the 1960s, few Koreans settled in the city. Almost no Koreans immigrated to Baltimore between 1883 and 1950. Koreans first started appearing in Baltimore in large numbers after the Immigration and Nationality Act of 1965 was passed, which abolished the national origin and racial quota system. By 1978, Koreans were the largest Asian-American group in the city. The new law encouraged the immigration of skilled Korean workers, including mechanics and engineers for the city's industries. Many Korean immigrants founded groceries, dry cleaners, and other mom and pop businesses.

The Korean immigrant community in the city was the most solid from the 1970s until the 1990s, after which urban flight led many Koreans to settle in surrounding counties, particularly Howard County. A cluster of Korean restaurants still exist in the lower part of Charles Village, north of the location of the first Korean grocery in Baltimore (the Far East House).

The community numbered 17,987 as of 2000, making up 0.7% of Baltimore's population. At that time Koreans were the largest non-white group in Baltimore after African-Americans.

In 2004, Korea was the fifth highest country of birth for new residents of Baltimore.

As of September 2014, immigrants from Korea were the seventh largest foreign-born population in Baltimore and the Korean language was the fifth most spoken language after English.

== Institutions ==
The Korean-American Grocers & Licensed Beverage Association of Maryland, Inc. (Korean: 메릴랜드 한인 식품 주류협회) or KAGRO of Maryland assists Korean-American business owners. In 1995 the organization launched a program that gives $1000 scholarships to students. The new "Transform Baltimore" Zoning Code, was passed by the City Council and was signed into law on December 5, 2016. The new "Transform Baltimore" Zoning Code affected approximately 90 Korean owned liquor stores in Baltimore. In response, Julian Min, a political activist organized and founded The Asian-American Licensed Beverage Association of Maryland, Inc., or ALBA. Jong-ho Lee, a businessman, owner of Penn Liquors on Greenmount Ave., served as 1st president of ALBA.

== Race relations ==
Koreans in Baltimore report anti-Korean bigotry from the city government and African-Americans. Cultural differences and language barriers, resulting in a lack of communication and collaboration, have contributed to animosity between African-Americans and Koreans. At the city-owned Lafayette Market, the government cancelled the leases of Korean shop owners in order to increase the number of African-American shop-owners, a move that has been accused of being discriminatory to Koreans.

Race relations between African-Americans and Korean-Americans were tense during the 1990s due to mistreatment of African-Americans by Korean migrants and the belief that Korean grocery stores were selling poor-quality food. Korean-Americans feared for their personal safety after a rash of robberies and murders against Koreans and questioned whether these crimes were racially motivated. Tensions between the two communities reached a boiling point after a mostly African-American jury acquitted an African-American who was accused of the robbery and murder of a Korean college student. Representatives of the Korean community filed complaints with the Maryland Advisory Committee to the U.S. Commission on Civil Rights, accusing the city government and law enforcement of failing to protect Koreans and Korean businesses. In response to these complaints, African-American and Korean community leaders sought ways to better race relations and the city government expanded language services and other outreach to Koreans. Under federal law, Baltimore city government and law enforcement are now required to offer language services to Korean speakers.

Many Koreans are distrustful of the government. Language barriers, lack of political representation, fear of retaliation when criminal court cases fall apart, and lack of police response contributes to distrust for the criminal justice system.

In 2012, a proposed change in the city's zoning laws made many Korean shop-owners worry that they could be put out of business. Koreans own most corner liquor stores in Baltimore and many feel that they have been unfairly targeted by city government. Over 40 years ago, in 1971, many dozens of liquor stores were grandfathered into city zoning changes. Proposed changes in zoning laws could strip many of these Korean-owned stores of their licenses. If the zoning law were passed, liquor stores with grandfathered licenses would be forced to stop selling liquor within two years, sell their liquor license to someone else, or move their business to an area zoned for liquor. In response, several dozen Korean grocery and liquor store owners have alleged they are being unfairly targeted.

A law proposed in 2012 that would ban youths from buying any items from liquor stores was alleged to be racist against Koreans by the Korean-American Grocers & Licensed Beverage Association of Maryland. The legal adviser for the association compared the law to 19th century Chinese Laundry Laws which were used to close down Chinese-owned businesses in San Francisco.

Following the death of Freddie Gray, many Korean-owned stores in Baltimore were damaged or looted during the 2015 Baltimore riot. Of the 380 businesses damaged or looted by the rioters, 100 of them were owned by Korean-Americans. Despite the riots costing Korean-American business owners approximately $2 million in damages, some stores have reopened with the fund-raising efforts from Julian Min, a political activist and other Korean-American fund-raisers. While Baltimore has a history of racial tension between African-Americans and Korean-Americans, some Korean-Americans such as Eunhae Gohng believe that Korean-owned stores were targeted for economic rather than racial reasons. In response to the damage caused by the riots to Korean-American businesses, a performance titled "Bmore Seoul to Soul" was held in the Station North Arts and Entertainment District featuring both African-American and Korean-American dancers in an attempt to relieve tensions between the two communities.

== Koreatown ==
There is a small portion of lower Charles Village (officially referred to as the Station North Arts and Entertainment District) that is sometimes referred to as Koreatown or Little Korea and is home to a number of Korean restaurants, but it has not been officially designated as a Koreatown. This informal Koreatown is bound on the north by 24th Street, on the south by North Avenue, on the west by Maryland Avenue, and on the east by St. Paul Street. In 2017, Julian Min was appointed as Director of International Affairs, where he advocated for Koreatown in Baltimore to attract and retain Korean-American owned businesses.

The origins of Koreatown lie in 1965 with the passage of the Immigration and Nationality Act, which removed legal barriers to immigration to the United States, among other nationalities. It was in Koreatown where many Korean immigrants moved, from the 1960's through the 1990's. 'Preserving Baltimore's Koreatown' was founded in 2025 to preserve, document and mark the history of Koreatown.

== Culture ==
An annual Korean Festival is held at Baltimore's War Memorial Plaza every September. The festival is organized by the Korean Society of Maryland and has been held for over 35 years.

Many Baltimore Koreans are Christians. There are over 40 Korean churches in the Baltimore area.

== Health ==
Koreans in Baltimore are an under-served population and many lack access to healthcare. This lack of access to healthcare has been an ongoing problem for the city's Korean community. According to one study, only 40% of Koreans received healthcare when they needed it and 86% who did obtain healthcare had difficulties doing so, primarily due to language barriers. In response to these difficulties, the Johns Hopkins School of Nursing and Julian Min, a philanthropist helped found the Korean Resource Center, a non-profit community-based education and research foundation in order to mobilize resources in the Korean community and aid elderly Koreans. In 1999, the Baltimore Metropolitan Korean Senior Center was founded in order to focus on the needs of elderly Koreans in Baltimore, offering English language courses, daily lunches, field trips, and healthcare aid.

== Notable people ==
- Mina Cheon, a new media artist, scholar, and educator.
- David J. Kim, CEO and founder of C2 Education
- Sonja Sohn, actress who played Kima Greggs on The Wire
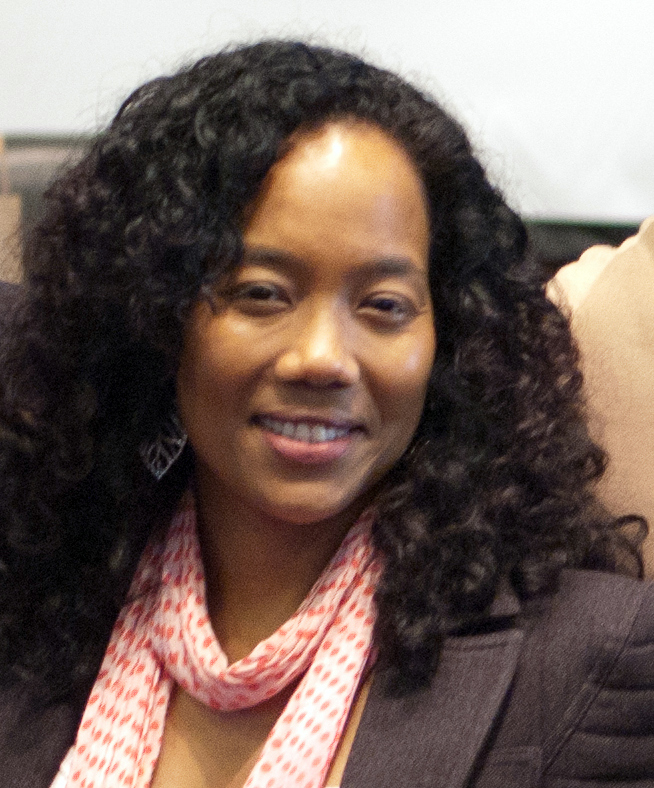
Sonja Sohn, actress best known as Detective Kima Greggs on The Wire

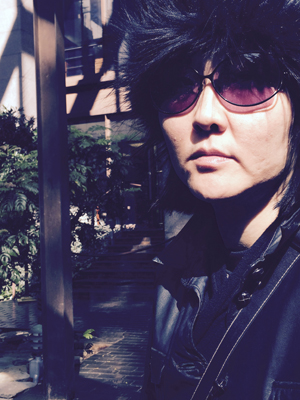
Mina Cheon, artist, scholar, and educator

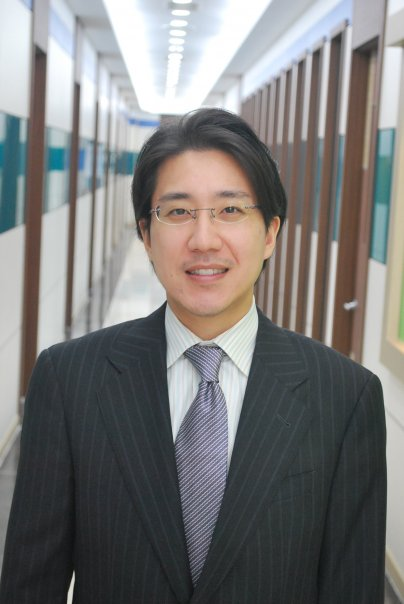
David J. Kim, CEO and founder of C2 Education

== See also ==
- Asian-Americans in Maryland
- Ethnic groups in Baltimore
- History of Baltimore
- Koreans in Washington, D.C.
