= List of Chinese schools in the United States =

Chinese schools in the United States

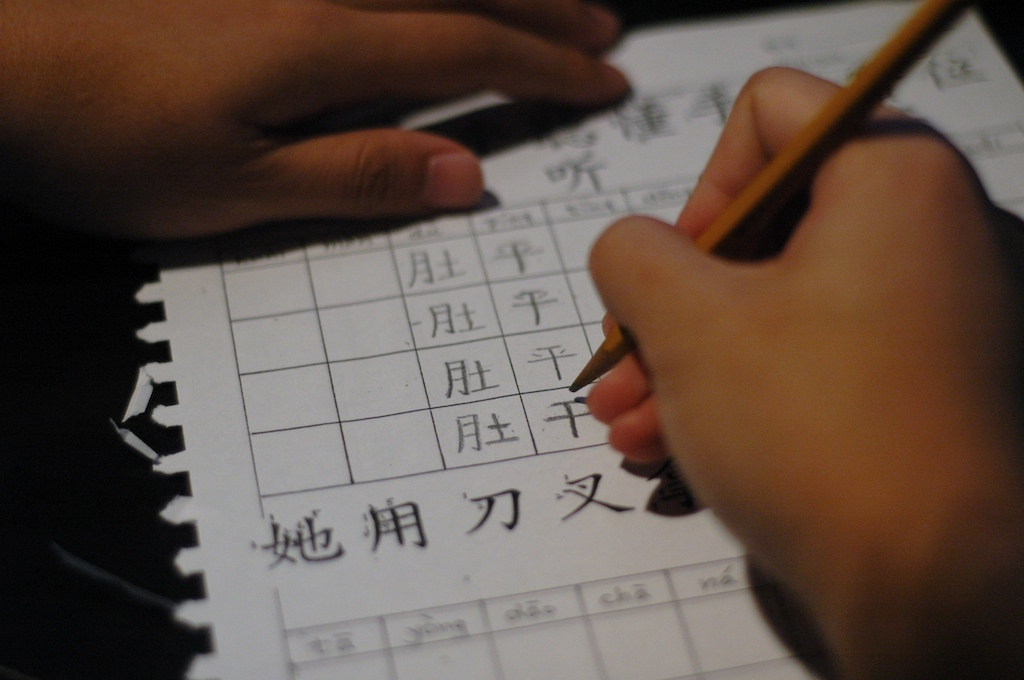
A student practices writing Chinese characters.

The following is a list of Chinese schools in the United States for children and adult learners.

This list includes schools run by both Chinese Americans of Mainland and Taiwanese heritage, specializing in both Simplified and Traditional Chinese. This list does not include Chinese or Taiwanese international schools, nor does it include Chinese-language programs run within broader academic institutions, such as high schools or universities (e.g. Confucius Institutes). Furthermore, for the sake of brevity, only Chinese schools that are currently open, operate in-person, and have a website will be listed.

== List ==
List of Chinese schools in the United States
Name in English	Name in Chinese (Simplified)	Name in Chinese (Traditional)	Location	Variety of Chinese taught (Mandarin unless otherwise specified)	Official website	Notes
Mun Lun School	明伦学校	明倫學校	Honolulu, Hawaii	Simplified/Traditional	About Us | Mun Lun School	established on Feb. 4th of 1911
Edison Chinese School	爱迪生中文学校	愛迪生中文學校	Edison, New Jersey	Traditional		Member of Association of Chinese Schools
Ann-Hua Chinese School	安华中文学校	安華中文學校	Ann Arbor, Michigan	Simplified		
Bangor Chinese School	班戈中文学校	班戈中文學校	Bangor, Maine	Simplified		
Northern Westchester Chinese School	北威中文学校	北威中文學校	Briarcliff Manor, New York	Traditional		Member of Association of Chinese Schools
Northern Virginia Chinese School	北维中文学校	北維中文學校	George Mason High School, Falls Church, Virginia	Traditional		Member of Washington Metropolitan Association of Chinese Schools
Berryessa Chinese School	博爱中文学校	博愛中文學校	Berryessa, San Jose, California	Simplified		
Bergen Chinese School	博根中文学校	博根中文學校	Tenafly High School, Tenafly, New Jersey	Traditional		Member of Association of Chinese Schools
Great Wall Chinese School	长城中文学校	長城中文學校	Sacramento, California	Simplified		
Great Wall Chinese School	长城中文学校	長城中文學校	Upper Darby, Pennsylvania	Simplified		
Chinese School of Delaware	德立华中文学校	德立華中文學校	Hockessin, Delaware	Traditional		Member of Association of Chinese Schools and Washington Metropolitan Association of Chinese Schools
Frederick Chinese School	费郡中文学校	费郡中文學校	Frederick, Maryland	Simplified		
Chinese Language School of Columbia	哥城中文学校	哥城中文學校	Ellicott City, Maryland	Traditional		Member of Washington Metropolitan Association of Chinese Schools
Guang Hua Chinese School	光华中文学校	光華中文學校	Montgomery County Community College, Blue Bell, Pennsylvania	Simplified		
Howard County Chinese School	哈维中文学校	哈維中文學校	Howard County Community College, Columbia, Maryland	Simplified		
Riverside Hua Xia Chinese School	河滨华夏中文学校	河濱華夏中文學校	Riverside, California	Simplified		
Mid-Hudson Chinese Language Center	赫德逊中区中文学校	赫德遜中區中文學校	Poughkeepsie, New York	Traditional		Member of Association of Chinese Schools
Washington School of Chinese Language and Culture	华府中文学校	華府中文學校	Thomas S. Wootton High School, Rockville, Maryland	Traditional		Member of Association of Chinese Schools
Huaxia Chinese School	华夏中文学校	華夏中文學校	Berkeley Heights, New Jersey; Bethlehem, Pennsylvania ("Lehigh Valley"); Bridgewater, New Jersey; Charlotte, North Carolina; Cherry Hill, New Jersey; East Brunswick, New Jersey; Edison, New Jersey; Livingston, New Jersey; Marlboro, New Jersey; Millburn, New Jersey; Montgomery, New Jersey; Old Westbury, New York ("Long Island"); Paramus, New Jersey ("Bergen"); Plainsboro, New Jersey; San Diego, California; Scarsdale, New York ("Greater New York"); Staten Island, New York City; Valhalla, New York ("New York Central"); Verona, New Jersey ("Northern New Jersey"); Wappingers Falls, New York ("Mid-Hudson"); West Chester, Pennsylvania, Pennsylvania ("Great Valley")	Simplified		
Huaxia Chinese School	华夏中文学校	華夏中文學校	Houston, Texas; Katy, Texas; Northwest Houston, Texas; Pearland, Texas; Sugar Land, Texas	Simplified		
Chinese Language School of Greater Hartford	哈特福中文学校	哈特福中文學校	Trinity College, Hartford, Connecticut	Traditional		Member of Association of Chinese Schools
Koo Chinese Academy	酷中文	酷中文	Basking Ridge, New Jersey	Simplified		
Rockland Chinese School	乐伦中文学校	樂倫中文學校	Dominican University New York, Orangeburg, New York	Traditional		Member of Association of Chinese Schools
Lexington Chinese Language School	勒星顿中文学校	勒星頓中文學校	Lexington, Massachusetts	Traditional		Member of Association of Chinese Schools
Li Ming Chinese School	黎明中文学校	黎明中文學校	Richard Montgomery High School, Rockville, Maryland	Traditional		Member of Association of Chinese Schools and Washington Metropolitan Association of Chinese Schools
Livingston Chinese School	李文斯顿中文学校	李文斯頓中文學校	Livingston, New Jersey	Traditional		Member of Association of Chinese Schools
Union Chinese School	联合中文学校	聯合中文學校	Westfield, New Jersey	Traditional		Member of Association of Chinese Schools
Westborough Chinese Language School	麻州中部中文学校	麻州中部中文學校	Westborough, Massachusetts	Traditional		Member of Association of Chinese Schools
Murray Hill Chinese School	梅山中文学校	梅山中文學校	Murray Hill, New Jersey	Traditional		Member of Association of Chinese Schools
Inland Empire Chinese School	美国内陆华美中文学校	美國內陸華美中文學校	Riverside, California	Traditional		
Hua Xia Chinese School at Mason	美圣华夏中文学校	美聖華夏中文學校	Mason, Ohio	Simplified		
MingDe Chinese School	明德中文学校	明德中文學校	Wayne, Pennsylvania	Traditional		Member of Association of Chinese Schools and Washington Metropolitan Association of Chinese Schools
MN HuaXia Chinese School	明州华夏中文学校	明州華夏中文學校	Eden Prairie, Minnesota	Simplified		
Southern Connecticut Chinese School	南康中文学校	南康中文學校	Southern Connecticut State University, New Haven, Connecticut	Simplified		
Chinese Language School of Fairfield County	南康州中文学校	南康州中文學校	Stamford, Connecticut	Traditional		Member of Association of Chinese Schools
Chinese School of Southern Westchester	南威中文学校	南威中文學校	Edgemont High School, Scarsdale, New York	Simplified and Traditional		Member of Association of Chinese Schools
Chinese School of South Jersey	南泽西中文学校	南澤西中文學校	Cherry Hill, New Jersey	Traditional		Member of Association of Chinese Schools
Newton Chinese Language School	牛顿中文学校	牛頓中文學校	Newton, Massachusetts	Simplified		Member of Association of Chinese Schools
Mid-Jersey Chinese School	纽泽西中部中文学校	紐澤西中部中文學校	East Brunswick, New Jersey	Traditional		Member of Association of Chinese Schools
Tzu Chi Academy New York	纽约慈济人文学校	紐約慈濟人文學校	New York City; Long Island, New York; Boston, Massachusetts; Pittsburgh, Pennsylvania; Washington D.C.; Los Angeles, California; San Jose, California; Seattle, Washington	Traditional		Member of Association of Chinese Schools
New York Chinese School	纽约华侨学校	紐約華僑學校	Chinese Community Center, Chinatown, Manhattan, New York City	Traditional		Member of Association of Chinese Schools
New York Putnam County Chinese School	纽约普特南郡中文学校	紐約普特南郡中文學校	Carmel, New York	Simplified		Member of Association of Chinese Schools
Advantage Academy	纽约优势学苑	紐約優勢學苑	Fresh Meadows, New York City	Traditional		Member of Association of Chinese Schools
Enlighten Chinese School	启明中文学校	啟明中文學校	San Jose, California	Simplified		
Ray Chinese School	瑞华中文学校	瑞華中文學校	Lisle, Illinois	Simplified		
Staten Island Chinese School	史德顿岛中文学校	史德頓島中文學校	Staten Island, New York City	Traditional		Member of Association of Chinese Schools
Monmouth Fidelity Chinese School	维德孟华中文学校	維德孟華中文學校	Marlboro, New Jersey	Traditional		Member of Association of Chinese Schools
Wei Hwa Chinese School	维华中文学校	維華中文學校	Burke, Virginia	Traditional		Member of Association of Chinese Schools and Washington Metropolitan Association of Chinese Schools
Winchester School of Chinese Culture	文诚中国文化学校	文誠中國文化學校	Winchester, Massachusetts	Simplified		Member of Association of Chinese Schools
Hope Chinese School	希望中文学校	希望中文學校	Chantilly, Virginia; Tysons Corner, Virginia; Potomac, Maryland; Gaithersburg, Maryland	Simplified		Member of Association of Chinese Schools
Modern Chinese School	现代中文学校	現代中文學校	Flushing, Queens, New York City; Fresh Meadows, New York	Simplified		
Jersey Shore Chinese School	新海中文学校	新海中文學校	Holmdel, New Jersey	Traditional		Member of Association of Chinese Schools
NewStar Chinese School	新星中文学校	新星中文學校	Davis, California	Simplified		
Houston Evergreen Chinese School	休士顿长青中文学校	休士頓長青中文學校	Houston, Texas	Traditional		

== See also ==
- Chinese school
- List of Chinese American associations
