= Lanham, Maryland =

Census-designated place in the United States

- Census-designated place
- Location in Maryland Lanham (the United States)
- Coordinates: 38°58′01″N 76°51′43″W
- Country: United States
- State: Maryland
- County: Prince George's

Area
  - Total: 3.55 sq mi (9.19 km^{2})
  - Land: 3.53 sq mi (9.14 km^{2})
  - Water: 0.019 sq mi (0.05 km^{2})

Population (2020)
  - Total: 11,282
  - Density: 3,198/sq mi (1,234.7/km^{2})
- Time zone: UTC−5 (Eastern (EST))
  - Summer (DST): UTC−4 (EDT)
- ZIP Code: 20706
- FIPS code: 24-45550
- GNIS feature ID: 597661

Lanham is an unincorporated community and census-designated place in Prince George's County, Maryland, United States. As of the 2020 United States census, it has a population of 11,282. The New Carrollton station (the terminus of the Washington Metro's Orange Line) as well as an Amtrak station are across the Capital Beltway in New Carrollton, Maryland. Doctors Community Hospital is located in Lanham.

== History ==
The Thomas J. Calloway House was listed on the National Register of Historic Places in 2005.

== Geography ==
According to the U.S. Census Bureau, Lanham has a total area of 3.6 square miles (9.2 km^{2}), of which 3.5 square miles (9.1 km^{2}) is land and 0.02 square miles (0.05 km^{2}), or 0.54%, is water.

== Government and infrastructure ==
Prince George's County Police Department District 2 Station in Brock Hall CDP, with a Bowie postal address, serves the community.

The U.S. Postal Service operates the Lanham Seabrook Post Office in Lanham CDP.

== Economy ==
EdTech company 2U (Nasdaq: REVU), Shoppers Food & Pharmacy, reverse logistics company Optoro, software company Vocus, media company Radio One and publisher Rowman & Littlefield are based in Lanham.

== Demographics ==
Historical population
Census	Pop.	Note	%±
2010	10,157		—
2020	11,282		11.1%
U.S. Decennial Census; 2010, 2020

Lanham first appeared as a census designated place in the 2010 U.S. census formed from part of the deleted Lanham-Seabrook CDP and part of Mitchellville CDP.

=== Racial and ethnic composition ===
Lanham CDP, Maryland – Racial and ethnic composition Note: the US Census treats Hispanic/Latino as an ethnic category. This table excludes Latinos from the racial categories and assigns them to a separate category. Hispanics/Latinos may be of any race.
Race / Ethnicity (NH = Non-Hispanic)	Pop 2010	Pop 2020	% 2010	% 2020
White alone (NH)	808	588	7.96%	5.21%
Black or African American alone (NH)	6,579	5,998	64.77%	53.16%
Native American or Alaska Native alone (NH)	16	17	0.16%	0.15%
Asian alone (NH)	319	352	3.14%	3.12%
Native Hawaiian or Pacific Islander alone (NH)	5	0	0.05%	0.00%
Other race alone (NH)	28	50	0.28%	0.44%
Mixed race or Multiracial (NH)	133	233	1.31%	2.07%
Hispanic or Latino (any race)	2,269	4,044	22.34%	35.84%
Total	10,157	11,282	100.00%	100.00%

=== 2020 census ===
As of the 2020 census, Lanham had a population of 11,282. The median age was 37.2 years. 25.2% of residents were under the age of 18 and 15.0% of residents were 65 years of age or older. For every 100 females there were 95.0 males, and for every 100 females age 18 and over there were 92.3 males age 18 and over.

100.0% of residents lived in urban areas, while 0.0% lived in rural areas.

There were 3,136 households in Lanham, of which 39.0% had children under the age of 18 living in them. Of all households, 49.6% were married-couple households, 14.8% were households with a male householder and no spouse or partner present, and 30.5% were households with a female householder and no spouse or partner present. About 18.3% of all households were made up of individuals and 9.2% had someone living alone who was 65 years of age or older.

There were 3,224 housing units, of which 2.7% were vacant. The homeowner vacancy rate was 0.5% and the rental vacancy rate was 4.5%.

=== Religion ===
- Diyanet Center of America
- Grace Church
- Grace Presbyterian Church
- Kingdom Hall for Jehovah's Witnesses
- Korean Maryland Presbyterian Church
- Lanham Evangelical Lutheran Church in America (ELCA)
- Lanham United Methodist Church
- Murugan Temple of North America
- New Dimensions Church
- Prince George's Muslim Association
- Sri Siva Vishnu Temple
- St. Matthias the Apostle Catholic Parish
- St. Theodore Greek Orthodox Church
- Trinity Reformed Presbyterian Church (Orthodox Presbyterian Church)

== Education ==
Prince George's County Public Schools serves Lanham CDP.

Residents of the CDP are divided between James McHenry Elementary School and Seabrook Elementary School. All residents are zoned to Thomas Johnson Middle School and DuVal High School.

There is a private Catholic school, Academy of Saint Matthias the Apostle.

Other area schools:

Elementary schools

- Catherine T. Reed Elementary School
- Gaywood Elementary School
- Magnolia Elementary School
- Robert Goddard Montessori School

Middle schools

- Robert Goddard Montessori

Colleges

- Washington Bible College/Capital Bible Seminary/Equip Institute

== Notable people ==
- Antoine Brooks (born 1997), NFL player and Super Bowl LVI champion
- Daryl Ferguson (born 1985), Barbadian association footballer
- Robert Griffith (born 1970), former NFL strong safety
- Frank Kratovil (born 1968), former US Congressman
- Jermaine Lewis (born 1974), former NFL wide receiver
- Guy S. Meloy Jr. (1903–1968), former US Army general
- Chinanu Onuaku (born 1996), basketball player
- Lio Rush (born 1994), professional wrestler
