= John Myung (poker player) =

American accountant and poker player

World Series of Poker
- Bracelet: None
- Money finishes: 41
- Highest WSOP Main Event finish: None

World Poker Tour
- Title: None
- Final table: None
- Money finishes: 6

John Myung is an American accountant and poker player of Korean descent, based in Vienna, Virginia.

== Before poker ==
Myung graduated from Cornell University. He was training to be a medical doctor in Manhattan but quit as he did not wish to commit six years of his life to studying. He took a job at Morgan Stanley on the 73rd floor of the World Trade Center but quit on September 1, 2001 (very shortly before the September 11, 2001 attacks) to take another job on Wall Street. The effect of the attacks led to him moving to Rockville, Maryland, where he started playing poker.

== Poker career ==
Myung is best known as the winner of the 2003 Showdown at the Sands poker tournament, where he won $1,000,000, defeating 196 other players.

As of 2017, his total live tournament winnings exceed $2,725,000. He has finished in the money of 41 times in World Series of Poker (WSOP) events, including three 3rd-place finishes.

Myung also appeared in the second season of the Poker Superstars Invitational Tournament.

== See also ==
- Koreans in Washington, D.C.
