= Sri Siva Vishnu Temple =

Hindu temple in Lanham, Maryland

Coordinates: 38°59′4.7″N 76°51′12.5″W

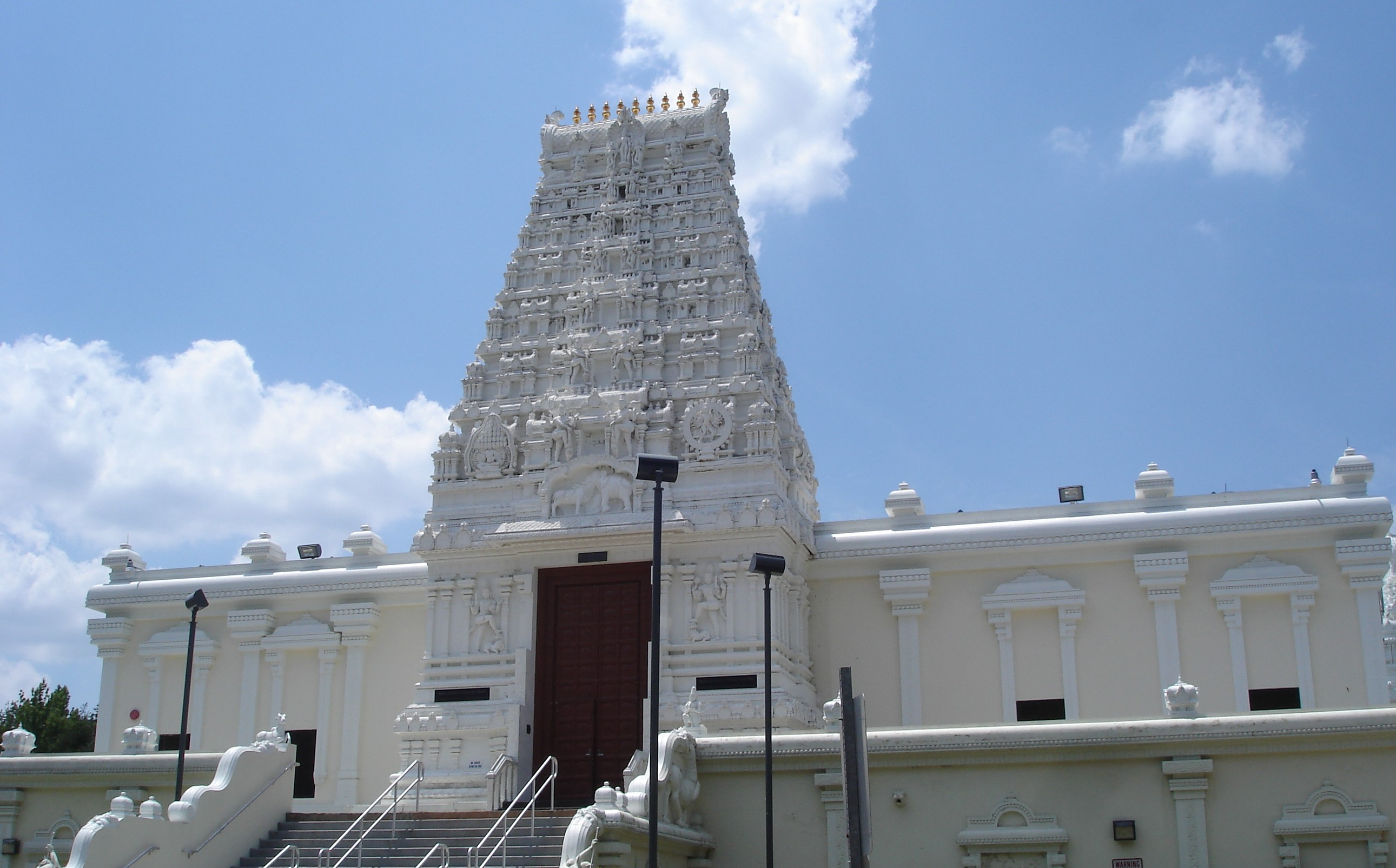
- Front view of Shri Siva Vishnu Temple located in Lanham, Maryland.

Religion
- Affiliation: Hindu
- Region: Greater Washington D.C.

Location
- Location: 6905 Cipriano Road Lanham, MD 20706
- State: Maryland
- Interactive map of Sri Siva Vishnu Temple

Architecture
- Groundbreaking: 1988
- Completed: 2002

Sri Siva Vishnu Temple is a Hindu temple located in Lanham, Maryland, right outside of Washington D.C. It is the second temple to be established in the Washington D. C. Metropolitan area.

The main deities represented in the temple include Shiva as Ramanathaswamy (the deity of the Rameswaram Temple) and Vishnu as Ananthapadmanabha (the deity of the Padmanabhaswamy Temple). Along with them, there are shrines for Parvathi, Lakshmi, Saraswathi, Durga, Rama, Krishna, Ganapathi, Subrahmanya, Andal, Hanuman and Navagrahas.

In 2026, the five day Sri Krishna Anugraha Mahotsava drew large crowds.

== Photo gallery ==
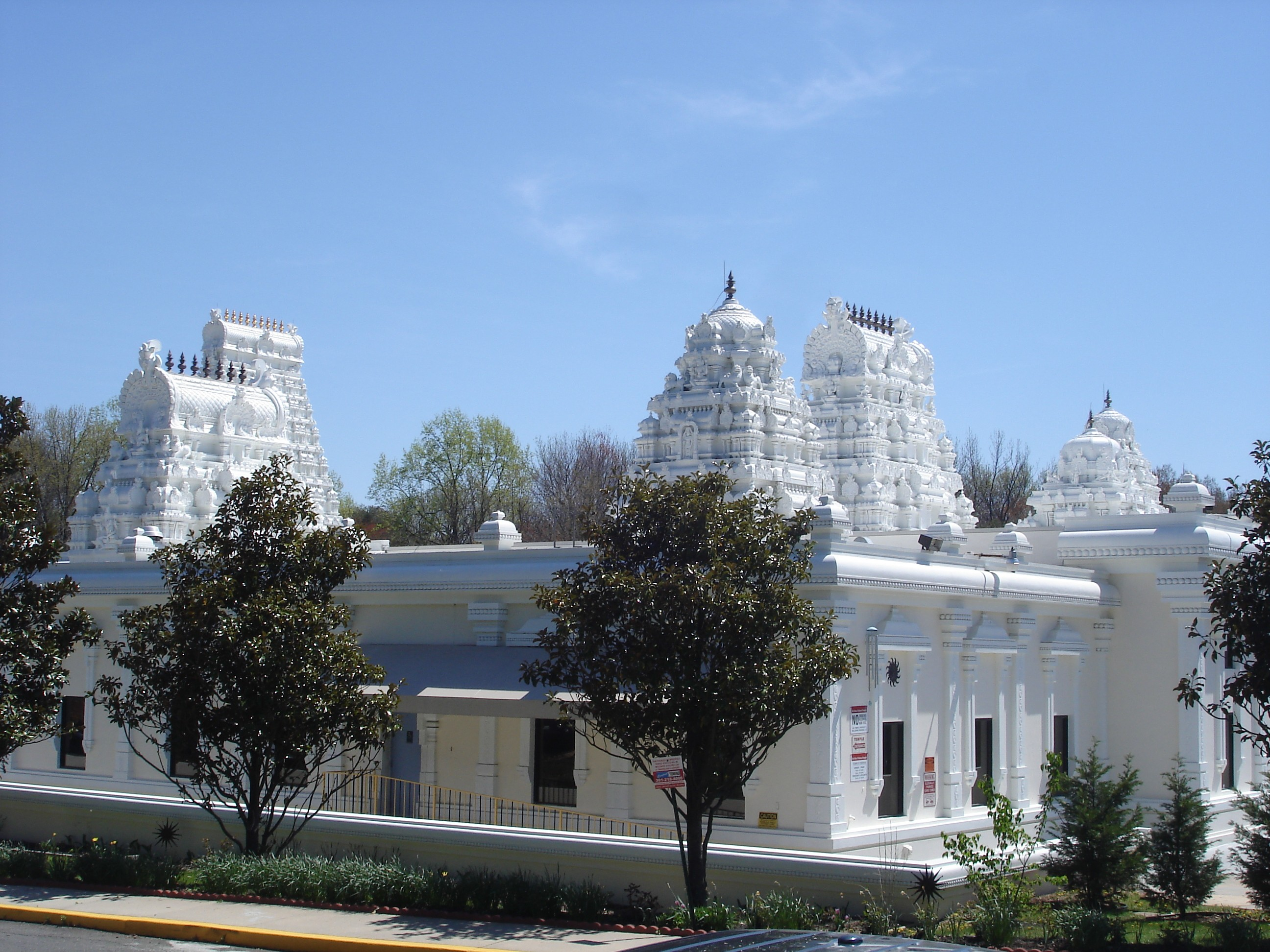
View

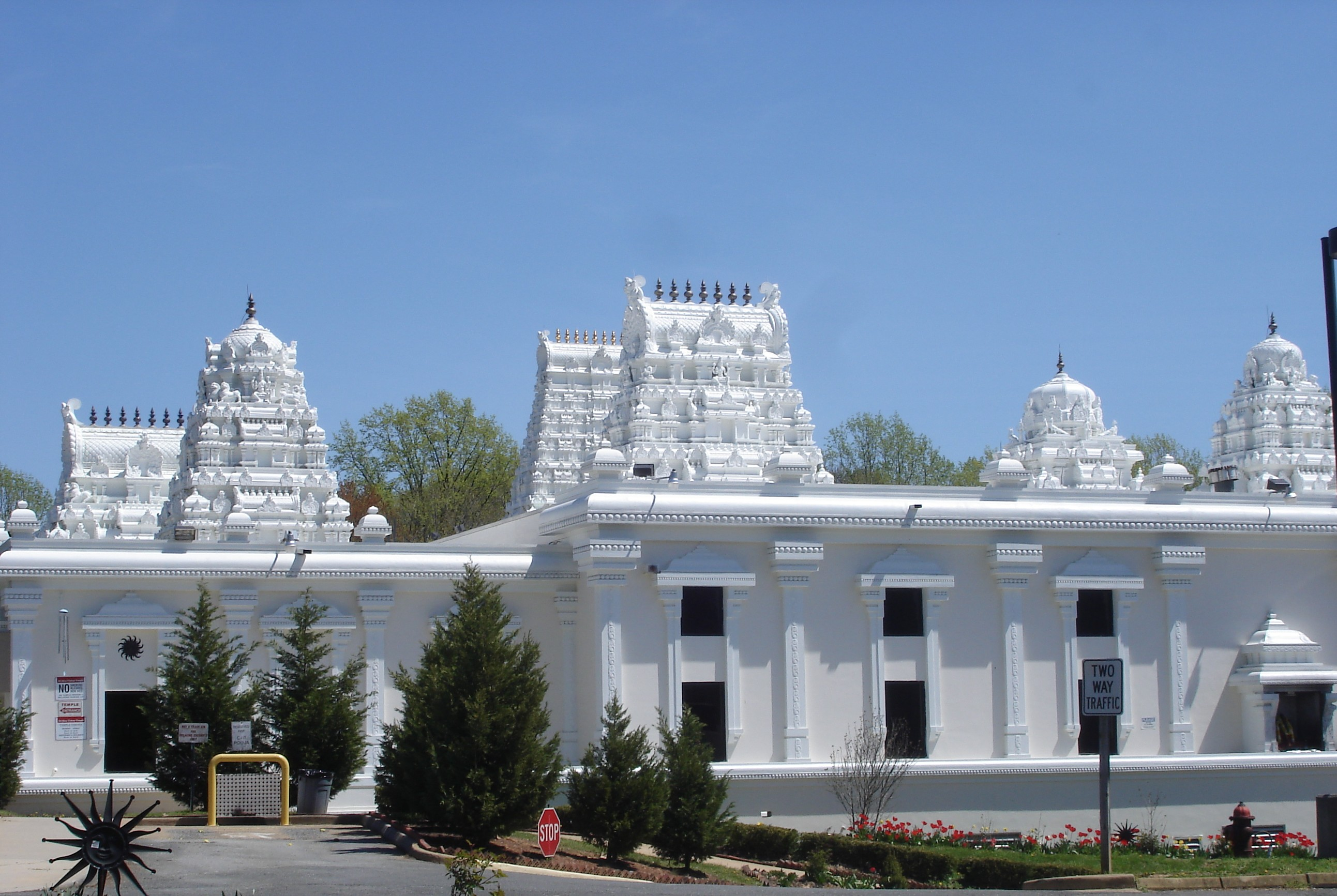
View
