= Murugan Temple of North America =

Hindu temple in Maryland, U.S.

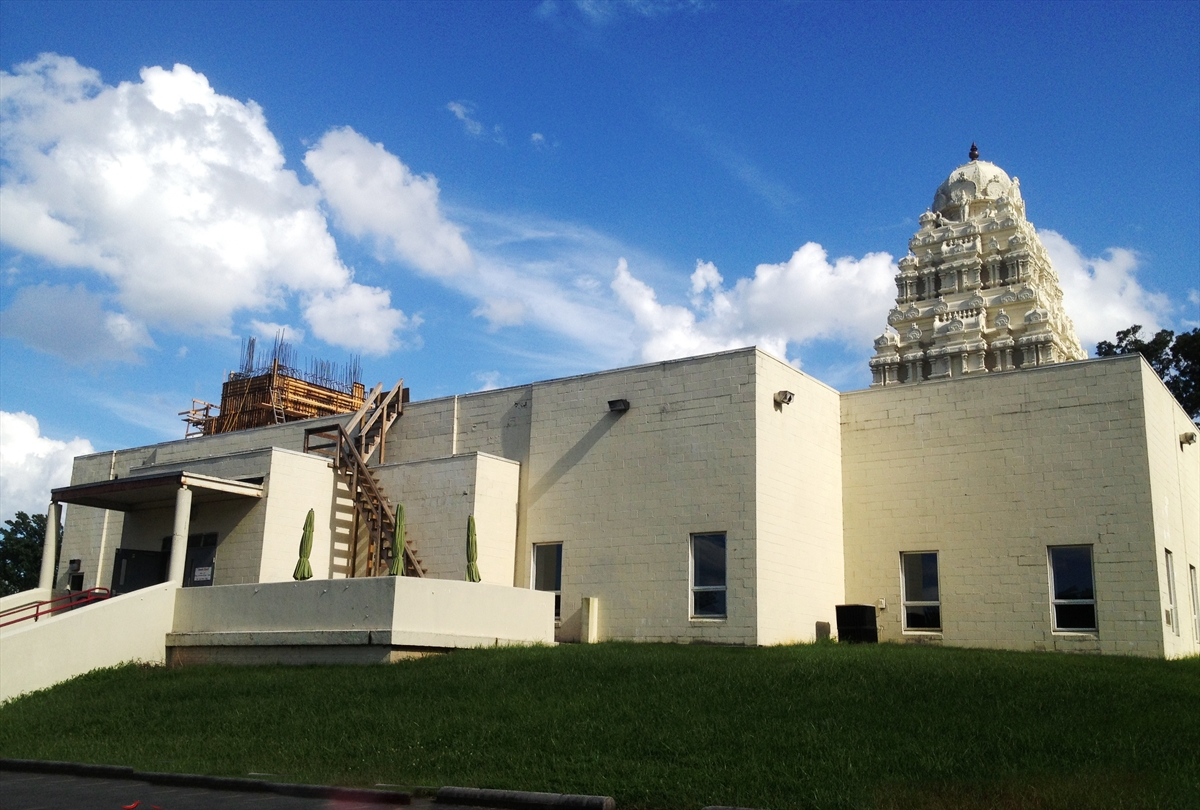

Religion
- Affiliation: Hinduism
- Deity: Murugan and Shiva

Location
- Location: Lanham
- State: Maryland
- Country: U.S.
- Interactive map of Murugan Temple of North America
- Coordinates: 38°58′10.43″N 76°52′3.16″W

Architecture
- Groundbreaking: May 29-31, 1999

Website
- murugantemple.org

The Murugan Temple of North America is the first temple in the United States that is dedicated to the Hindu deity Murugan. The temple is located in Lanham, Maryland, about 5 miles (8.0 km) from Washington, D.C.

== History ==
Prior to the establishment of the temple in 1999, the worshippers visited a two-story house since 1983. The temple is the fourth to be established in the Washington D. C. Metropolitan area.

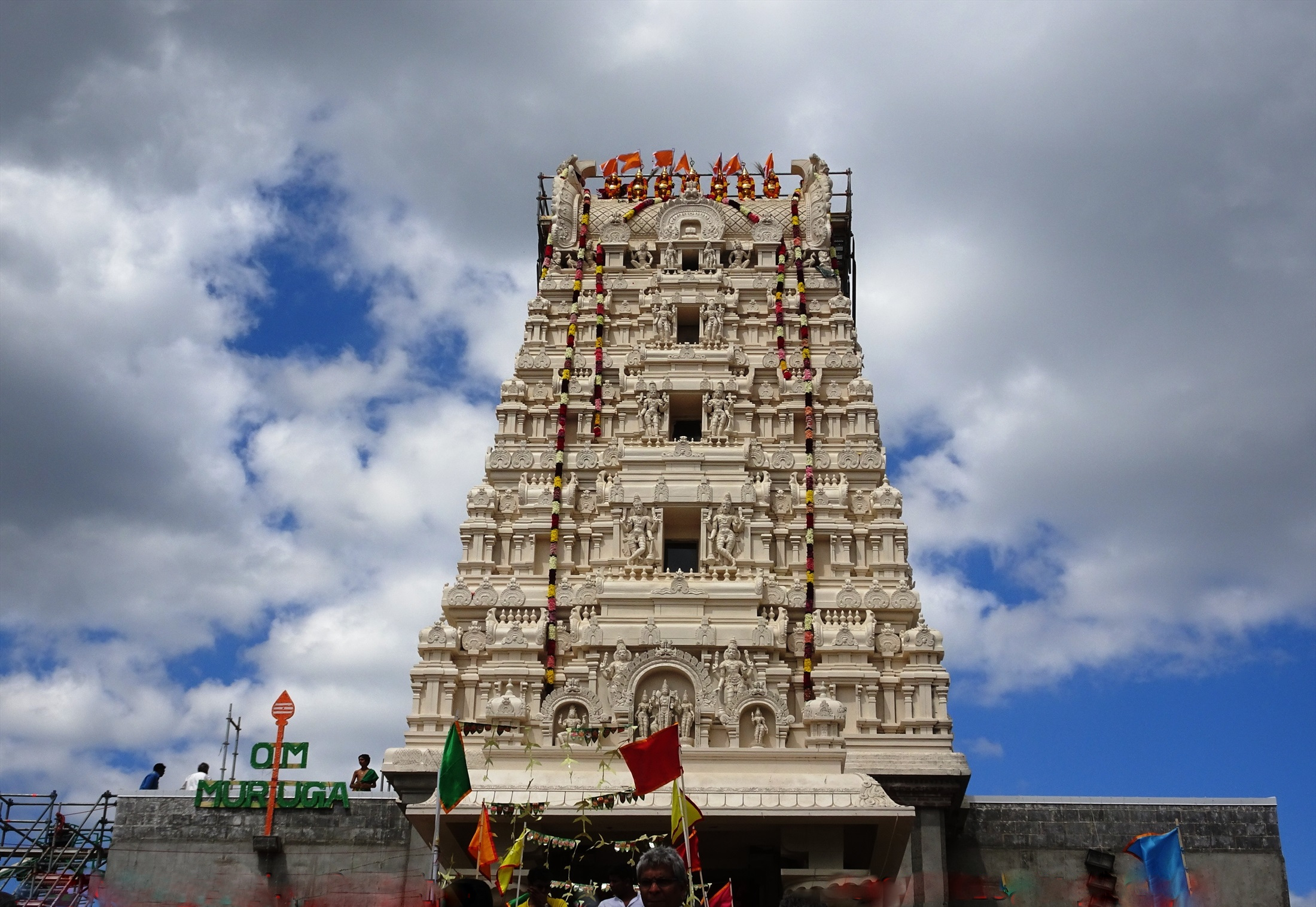
Noothana Rajagopura Mahaa Kumbhabishekam Lanham Murugan Temple

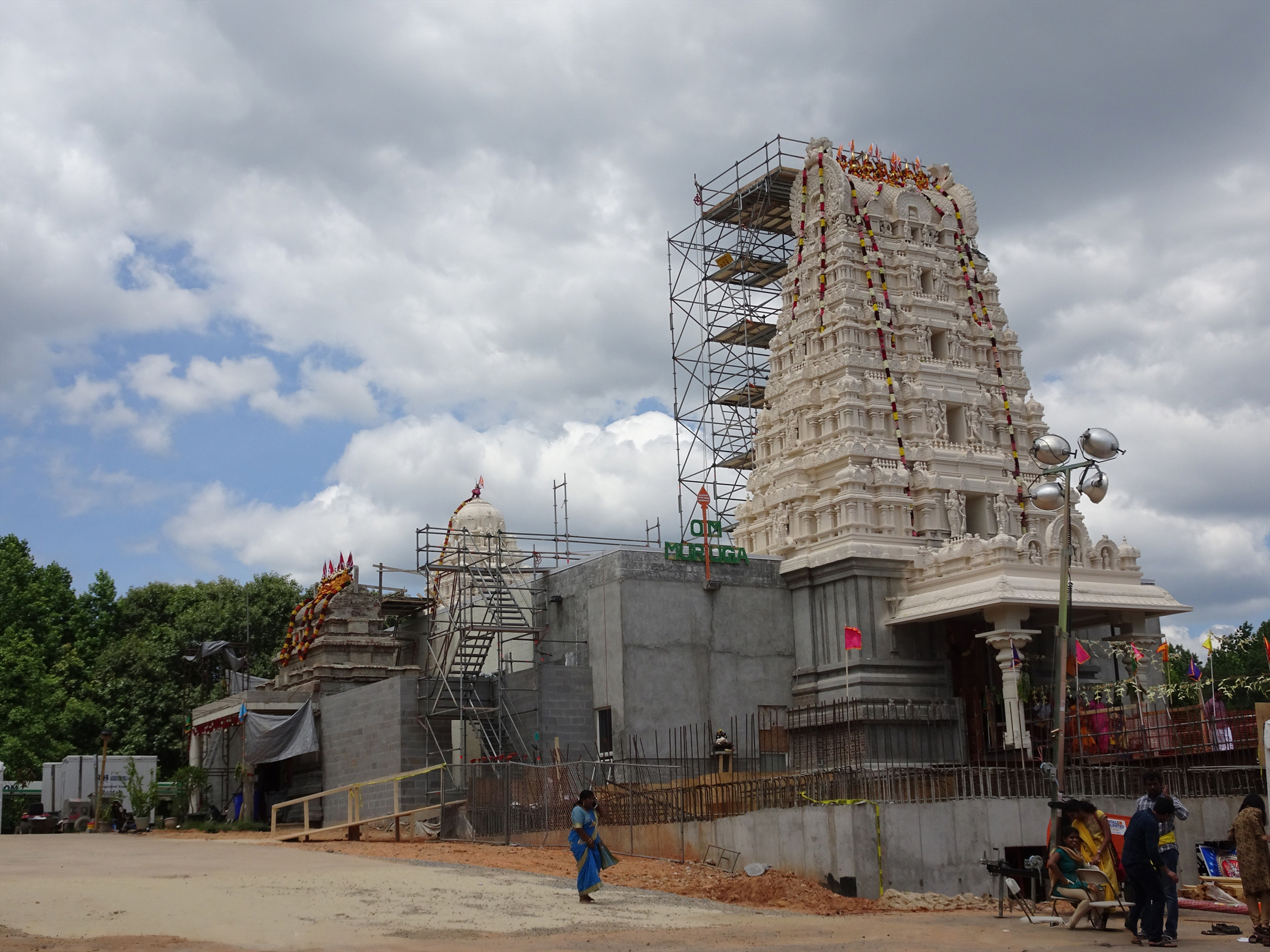
USA Murugan Temple - Noothana Rajagopura Mahaa Kumbhabishekam
