= Association of Chinese Schools =

Association of Chinese Schools was founded by Prof. Peter P.C. Chou and six schools in Philadelphia in 1974. The goals are to provide a forum for Chinese language and culture schools to share their common interests, to exchange views and ideas, to assist school activities, to improve the quality of teaching, to promote Chinese teaching into the mainstream American education system. The Association of Chinese Schools is a non-profit, non-political independent organization. The organization was founded with 6 member schools and has grown to 56 member schools. The Association is a member of the Consortium for Language Teaching & Learning from the University of Maryland's National Foreign Language Center.

== Member schools ==
There are 56 member schools in the East Coast of the United States:

1. Tzu Chi Academy New York (紐約慈濟人文學校)
2. Shuang Wen Academy Network (展望中美國際學校)
3. Staten Island Chinese School (史德頓島中文學校)
4. 紐約華僑學校
5. 鳴遠中文學校
6. Chinese Cultural Association of Long Island & Chinese School (紐約長島文教協會暨中文學校)
7. 長島慈濟人文學校
8. 長島豐盛生命教會中文學校
9. 長島大頸中文學校
10. 長島南灣中文學校
11. Advantage Academy Fresh Meadows (優勢學苑)
12. 紐約人力中心中文學校
13. 長恩中文學校
14. Gaithersburg Chinese School (蓋城中文學校)
15. Tzu Chi Academy, Washington D.C. (華府慈濟人文學校)
16. 黎明中文學校
17. Kuang Chi Chinese School (光啟中文學校)
18. Washington School of Chinese Language and Culture (華府中文學校)
19. Northern Virginia Experimental Chinese School (北維州實驗中文學校)
20. Wei Hwa Chinese School (維華中文學校)
21. Chinese School of South Jersey (南澤西中文學校)
22. Mingde Chinese School (明德中文學校)
23. Lehigh Valley Chinese School (理海谷中文學)
24. Chinese School of Delaware (德立華中文學校)
25. Northern New Jersey Chinese Association Chinese School
26. Murray Hill Chinese School
27. Mid-Jersey Chinese School
28. Monmouth Fidelity Chinese School (維德孟華中文學校)
29. Union Chinese School
30. Edison Chinese School
31. Livingston Chinese School
32. Princeton Chinese Lauguage School
33. Bergen Chinese School
34. Grace Taiwanese Presbyterian Church
35. Chinese Heritage School of New Jersey
36. Raritan Valley Chinese School
37. Jersey Shore Chinese School
38. MingHui School New Jersey Bridgewater Branch
39. Bergen Christian Testimony Church Chinese School
40. YingHua International School
41. Northern Westchester Chinese School (紐約北威中文學校)
42. Chinese School of Southern Westchester (紐約南威中文學校)
43. Mid-Hudson Chinese Language Center (赫德遜中區中文學校)
44. New York Putnam County Chinese School (纽约普特南郡中文学校)
45. Rockland Chinese School (紐約樂倫中文學校)
46. Chinese Language School of Greater Hartford (康州哈特福中文學校)
47. Chinese Language School of Fairfield County (南康州中文學校)
48. New Haven Chinese Language School (康州新港中文學校)
49. Westboro Chinese Language School (麻州中部中文學校)
50. Newton Chinese Language School (牛頓中文學校)
51. 勒星頓中文學校
52. The Chinese Language School in West Newton (中華語文學校)
53. Tzu Chi Academy Boston (波士頓慈濟人文學校)
54. 安城中文學校
55. Winchester School of Chinese Culture (文誠中國文化學校)

== Events, performances, and contests ==
The Association hosts events for its various member schools to compete and perform together. Events include speech competitions, singing competitions, history competitions, poster making competitions, and teaching seminars.

== See also ==
- Washington Metropolitan Association of Chinese Schools, an organization of Chinese Language Schools in the Baltimore-Washington metropolitan area
