= Greater Washington Area Asian-American demographics =

Asian Americans started to become a significant part of the Washington metropolitan area in the late twentieth century.

Fairfax County, Virginia, Montgomery County, Maryland, and Arlington, Virginia are the largest jurisdictions with high concentrations of Asian Americans in the region:

- Fairfax County
  - Korean – 3%
  - Indian – 3%
  - Vietnamese – 3%
  - Chinese – 2%
  - Filipino – 1%
- Montgomery County
  - Chinese – 3%
  - Indian – 3%
  - Korean – 2%
  - Vietnamese – 1%
  - Filipino – 1%
- Arlington County
  - Indian – 2%
  - Chinese – 2%
  - Filipino – 2%
  - Korean – 1%
  - Japanese – 1%

== Washington area racial composition ==
The area has been a destination for international immigration since the late 1960s. It also attracts internal migration from other parts of the U.S.

Racial composition of the Washington, D.C. area:

2006

- White: 51.7%
- Black: 26.3%
- Asian: 8.4%
- Hispanic: 11.6%
- Mixed and Other: 2.0%

1980

- White: 67.8%
- Black: 26.0%
- Asian: 2.5%
- Hispanic: 2.8%
- Mixed and Other: 0.9%

== Counties/county equivalents by number of Asian Americans ==
- Washington-Arlington-Alexandria, DC-VA-MD-WV Metropolitan Division
  - Fairfax County, Virginia – 126,038
  - Prince George's County, Maryland – 31,032
  - Arlington County, Virginia – 16,327
  - Washington, D.C. – 15,189
  - Loudoun County, Virginia – 9,067
  - Prince William County, Virginia – 10,701
  - Alexandria, Virginia – 7,249
  - Fairfax, Virginia – 2,617
  - Charles County, Maryland – 2,192
  - Stafford County, Virginia – 1,512
  - Spotsylvania County, Virginia – 1,243
  - Manassas, Virginia – 1,206
  - Falls Church, Virginia – 675
  - Calvert County, Maryland – 655
  - Manassas Park, Virginia – 418
  - Fauquier County, Virginia – 324
  - Fredericksburg, Virginia – 291
  - Jefferson County, West Virginia – 252
  - Warren County, Virginia – 136
  - Clarke County, Virginia – 62
- Bethesda-Gaithersburg-Frederick, MD Metropolitan Division
  - Montgomery County, Maryland – 98,651
  - Frederick County, Maryland – 3,269

== Counties/county equivalents by percentage of Asian Americans (Census 2000) ==
- Washington-Arlington-Alexandria, DC-VA-MD-WV Metropolitan Division (4,000,206)
  - Fairfax County, Virginia (969,749) 13.00%
  - Fairfax, Virginia (21,498) 12.17%
  - Arlington County, Virginia (189,453) 8.62%
  - Falls Church, Virginia (10,377) 6.50%
  - Alexandria, Virginia (128,283) 5.65%
  - Loudoun County, Virginia (169,599) 5.35%
  - Manassas Park, Virginia (10,290) 4.06%
  - Prince George's County, Maryland (846,123) 3.87%
  - Prince William County, Virginia (280,813) 3.81%
  - Manassas, Virginia (35,135) 3.43%
  - Washington, D.C. (572,059) 3.17%
  - Charles County, Maryland (120,546) 1.82%
  - Stafford County, Virginia (92,446) 1.64%
  - Fredericksburg, Virginia (19,279) 1.51%
  - Spotsylvania County, Virginia (90,395) 1.38%
  - Calvert County, Maryland (74,563) 0.88%
  - Jefferson County, West Virginia (42,190) 0.60%
  - Fauquier County, Virginia (55,139) 0.59%
  - Clarke County, Virginia (12,652 ) 0.49%
  - Warren County, Virginia (31,584) 0.43%
- Bethesda-Gaithersburg-Frederick, MD Metropolitan Division (1,139,343)
  - Montgomery County, Maryland (873,341) 11.30%
  - Frederick County, Maryland (195,277) 1.67%
