= Koreans in Washington, D.C. =

The Korean American community in the Washington, D.C., metropolitan area is the third-largest ethnic Korean community in the United States. Most Koreans in the area live in Virginia and Maryland suburbs.

In 1949, the Embassy of South Korea opened in Washington, D.C. In 1960, there were about 400 to 500 ethnic Koreans in that city. Most of them were wives of former U.S. soldiers, students, and embassy staff.

From 1990 to 2011, the Korean population in Fairfax County, Virginia, more than doubled. From 2001 to 2011, it increased by 13,000, or almost 50%.

== Demographics ==
The 2010 U.S. census found that 41,356 ethnic Koreans live in Fairfax County, Virginia, making up 3.8% of the county's population, and over 60% of Virginia's ethnic Koreans. In 2011, Steve Choi, president of the Korean-American Association of the Washington, D.C., Metro Area said the Korean population was under-counted because some Korean residents of Northern Virginia are illegal immigrants and because many are "very private people". As of 2010, the Koreans were Fairfax County's third-largest immigrant community. As of the 2000 U.S. census, 62% of the Koreans in Virginia were in Fairfax County.

Almost 25% of the ethnic Koreans in Fairfax County live in Annandale and Centreville. Annandale houses a Koreatown in the city center, active since the late 1980s. in 2011, University of Maryland Asian American studies professor Larry Shinagawa said more Koreans in Fairfax County are engaged in business. Dave Seminara of the Fairfax Times said that Choi and other Korean community leaders credited the growth of the Fairfax Korean community to the good Fairfax County Public Schools and the establishment of nonstop flights between Washington Dulles International Airport and Incheon Airport circa 2000. Pyong Gap Min, author of Asian Americans: Contemporary Trends and Issues, wrote in 2006 that the suburban lifestyle and proximity to Washington, D.C., made Fairfax County an attractive destination for the ethnic Koreans.

As of the 2000 U.S. census, there were 39,155 Koreans in Maryland; 40% of them were in Montgomery County, Maryland. Shinagawa stated that Koreans in Maryland are more likely to have high education compared to those in Virginia and that they tend to work in banking, government, law, and science.

== Economy ==
As of 2006, many Koreans in Fairfax County, Virginia operate businesses in Washington, D.C., and work for the federal government of the United States.

After Korean immigration began, many ethnic Koreans lived in northern Virginia while owning businesses in Washington, D.C. Liz Farmer of the Washington Examiner stated that during the early 1990s there were not very many Korean businesses in Annandale, Virginia. After the early 1990s, increasing numbers of Korean businesses opened in Virginia. Shinagawa stated that more Korean businesses opened in Virginia than in Maryland due to differing tax rates.

== Institutions ==
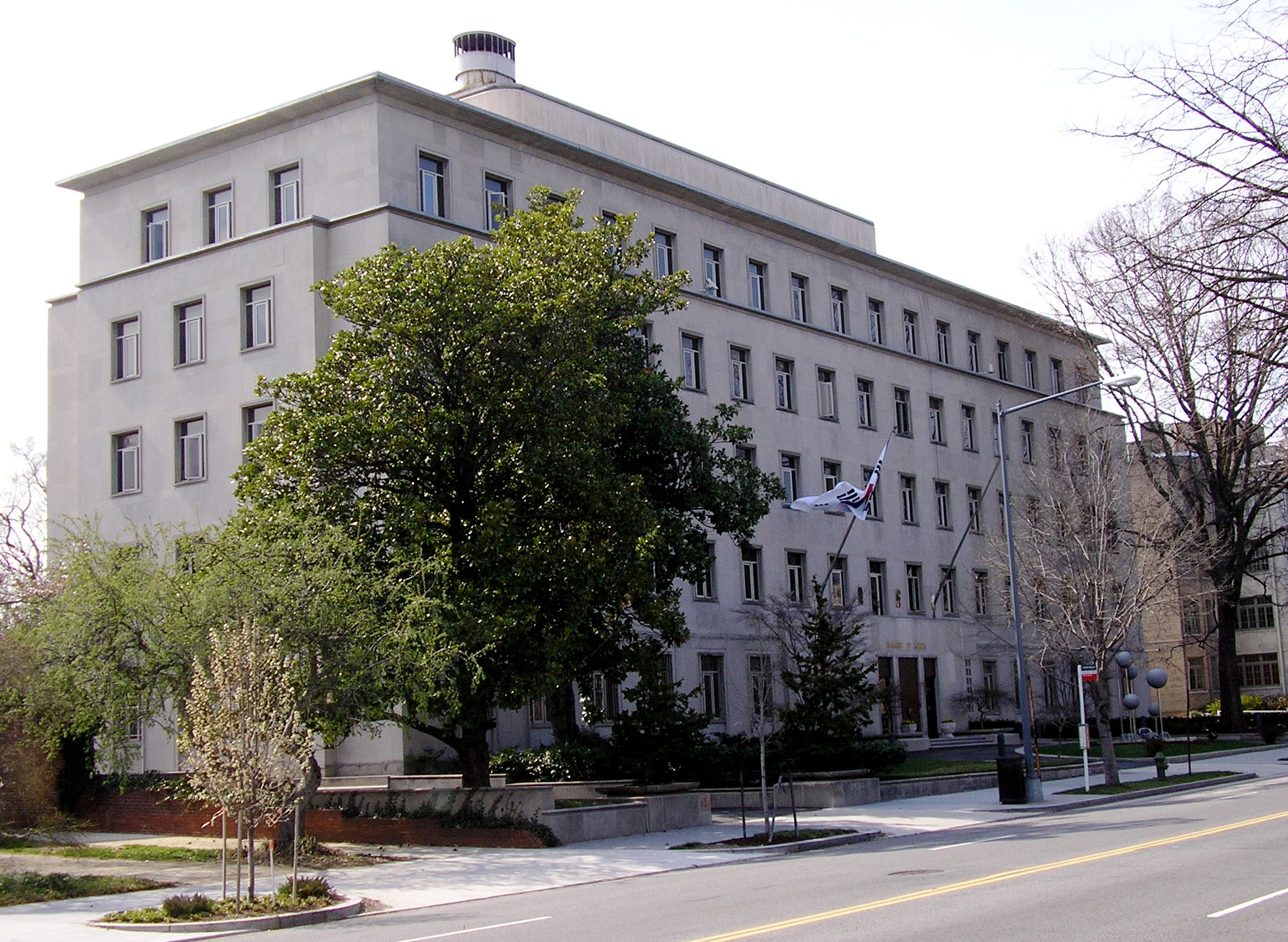
Embassy of South Korea, Washington, D.C.

The South Korean government maintains the Embassy of South Korea, Washington, D.C.

== Politics ==
The Washington Post printed an editorial arguing that Virginia state officials who were promising to take pro-Korean actions regarding the Sea of Japan (East Sea) dispute and the Fairfax County government establishing a World War II comfort women memorial were "pandering" and were not appropriate.

== Media ==
As of 2011, four Korean-language newspapers, three Korean-language television channels, and one Korean-language radio station are in Northern Virginia.

== Education ==
Fairfax County Public Schools offers Korean-language classes at Fairfax High School Academy and at four elementary schools, open to all.

As of September 2010, the school district had 6,387 students who natively speak Korean.

== Recreation ==
The Montgomery County, Maryland, government has established Korean-American Day.

== Religion ==
Two churches serving the Korean community in Centreville are Korean Central Presbyterian Church and St. Paul Chung Korean Catholic Church.

== Notable residents ==
- David Chang (restaurateur) - Vienna, Virginia
- John Myung (poker player) - Vienna, Virginia
- Seung-Hui Cho (perpetrator of the Virginia Tech massacre) - Centreville, Virginia

== See also ==
- History of the Koreans in Baltimore
- Old Korean Legation Museum
