= Mina Cheon =

Mina Cheon (MJ Standup Korean)
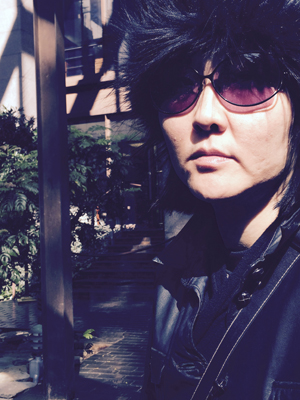
- Born: Seoul, South Korea
- Education: Ewha Womans University, Maryland Institute College of Art, University of Maryland; European Graduate School

Korean name
- Hangul: 천민정
- RR: Cheon Minjeong
- MR: Ch'ŏn Minjŏng

Mina Cheon (born 1973) is a Korean American new media artist and scholar, producer and curator of cultural projects. Since 1997, she has lived between Baltimore, New York, and Seoul. MJ Standup Korean is the comedy stage name of Mina Cheon, a prominent Korean-American "Polipop" (Political Pop) artist, professor, and scholar based in New York.

== Personal life and education ==
Cheon was born in Seoul, South Korea. Being the daughter of a South Korean diplomat and cultural attache, she grew up in the cities of Seoul, New York, Copenhagen, and Ottawa.

She received a BFA in painting from Ewha Womans University in Seoul, an MFA in painting from Hoffberger School of Painting, Maryland Institute College of Art (MICA), an MFA in imaging digital arts from University of Maryland, Baltimore County (UMBC). and a PhD in philosophy of media and communications from the European Graduate School, European University for Interdisciplinary Studies, Switzerland in 2008. She is a professor emerita of the Maryland Institute College of Art.

== Teaching ==
One of Cheon's educational contributions has been the international art program and exchange that she has led for American and Korean art, architecture, and design faculty and students. She has directed international art education since 2004, working with universities in Seoul such as Hongik University, Korea National University of Arts, and with Ewha Womans University in 2010, taking students from Maryland Institute College of Art (MICA) and Morgan State University to South Korea. Cheon expanded her teaching horizons from just art to teaching in the departments of Foundation; Art History; Language, Literature, and Culture; and Interactive Media. She was also the founder and director of the summer study abroad program MICA Korea that was held each summer in Seoul, Korea between 2004 and 2007.

== Exhibitions ==
Cheon's solo exhibitions include:

- “Haunted Koreas: Mina Cheon Retrospective 2005-2025,” at KODA, Lab for Creative Concepts, KODA House, Governors Island, NY
- “Haunted Koreas: Dreaming Unification Protest Peace,” at The Asian Arts and Culture Center, Towson University, Baltimore, MD
- “Haunted Koreas: Mina Cheon with Kim Il Soon,” at the American University Museum at the Katzen Arts Center, Washington, DC
- "Mina Cheon: Dreaming Unification Protest Peace,” at The Korea Society, New York, NY
- “UMMA : MASS GAMES – Motherly Love North Korea,” at the Ethan Cohen Gallery, New York, NYSeoul, Korea (2012) includes painting, new media art, interactive media, installation art, and performance art work.
- "Happy North Korean Children" at Trunk Gallery, Seoul
- "Choco-Pie Propaganda" at Ethan Cohen New York Gallery
- "POLIPOP: Political Pop Art" at Sungkok Art Museum, Seoul, Korea (2012) includes painting, new media art, interactive media, installation art, and performance art work.
- "Polipop and Paintings" at the Maryland Art Place Baltimore, Maryland
- "Groundless" at Lance Fung Gallery, New York, (2002)
- "Dizz/placement" at Insa Art Space, Art Council, Seoul, Korea
- "Addressing Dolls" at C.Grimalids Gallery, Baltimore, Maryland (named as "Best Solo Exhibition" by City Paper)

Diamonds Light Baltimore is a collaborative project built by Mina Cheon and Gabriel Kroiz composed of fifteen unique diamond shaped sculptures of different shapes and sizes. These sculptures are large enough for the audience to walk inside and through it. The diamond sculptures are made of LED lights to highlight the unique shape of the object.

On February 23, 2012, "Magic and Media," a New Media Caucus-sponsored panel, was held at the College Art Association 100th Annual Conference in Los Angeles. Cheon chaired the panel with Lisa Paul Streitfeld. The panel focused on the age of new media culture like reality TV shows, horror films, the re-creations of religious cults, online spiritual healing, and pop-star worship.

On March 3, 2018, Mina Cheon was the keynote speaker for Smith’s annual Miller Lecture in Art History in Weinstein Auditorium, Wright Hall, Smith College.

On September 16, 2018, South Korean President Moon Jae-in and the First Lady Kim Jung-sook came to Mina Cheon's “Eat Choco-Pie Together" installation at the 2018 Busan Biennale, Maryland Institute College of Art covered the story, "Virtuoso Faculty: Mina Cheon, Korean President Moon Jae-in and the First Lady Kim Jung-sook came to “Eat Choco-Pie Together,” an installation presented by MICA faculty member Mina Cheon at the 2018 Busan Biennale.

On June 30, 2021, Cheon held an artist talk with The Korean Society in New York City, where she had an exhibition of her art intended to demonstrate the unification and peace that both Koreas are seeking. As a global activism artist, Cheon’s projects to unite both Koreas include making a pair of sneakers where the flag of North Korea is drawn on one shoe, and on the other, the flag of South Korea is drawn. Her statement for this is that you need two feet to move forward; therefore, Koreans can’t move forward without leaving the other country behind.

On September 6, 2025, Cheon premiered bridging art and comedy event for peace-building at KODA New York. Also known as "MJ Standup Korean," artist Mina Cheon takes the stage as a standup comic performing all around New York with art history jokes and observational, satiric, dark romantic comedy that is message-driven, once a professor, always professing. She is a cultural producer and curator and has mounted thematic comedy shows in art and cultural spaces, including a Stand Up NY Presents projects.

On November 1, 2025, AHL Foundation Names Dr. Mina Cheon as 2025 Recipient of the AHL-AKAA Ran Hwang Fund. The research project will serve as an intergenerational study on diaspora and transnational identity. As a global Korean political pop new media artist, a recent project premiered K-Comedy at the AHL Foundation.

== Writing ==
=== Books ===
- Shamanism + Cyberspace (2009) Atropos Press, New York and Dresden ISBN 0-9825309-5-1
- Combat: Sports and Military (2010) Co-authored with G Kroiz, Culture Bank Publishing, Seoul, South Korea ISBN 978-89-964858-0-3

=== Articles ===
- "The Konglish Critique" in Beyond Critique (2013), co-authored with G Kroiz, edited by Susan Waters-Eller and Joseph J. Basile. Maisonneuve Press, College Park, MD ISBN 9780944624500)
- "Magic and Media" in Media-N: Journal of the New Media Caucus (2012) Media-N, NMC, USA; ISSN 2159-6891 - Cheon's chaired panel

Her artistic research involves delving into racism in published visual arts encompassing Asian nations that are found in images and popular culture.
