= Washington Metropolitan Association of Chinese Schools =

Group of schools in the Washington DC area

The Washington Metropolitan Association of Chinese Schools (WMACS), is an organization of Chinese Language Schools in the Baltimore-Washington metropolitan area. WMACS facilitates communication amongst its member schools and is a member association of the National Council of Associations of Chinese Language Schools (see external links). WMACS also sponsors teacher workshops and speech and calligraphy contests for students, and also hosts an annual field day and track meet for its member schools.

== Summer camp ==
WMACS is also often used to refer to the annual summer camp that the organization sponsors for Chinese-speaking youth between the ages of 8 and 18. This popular weeklong residential camp has been offered since 1989, and often sees campers returning as counselors after graduating high school. The camp has been held at:

- American University, 1989
- Towson University, 1990
- Salisbury State University, 1991–1995
- Camp Hemlock, VA, 1996
- Frostburg State University, 1997–Present

== Member institutions ==
- 中華聖經教會中文學校 Chinese Bible Church of Maryland Chinese School (CBCM-CS)
- 巴城中文學校 Chinese Language School of Baltimore
- 哥城中文學校 Chinese Language School of Columbia
- 德立華中文學校 Chinese School of Delaware
- 德明中文學校 Chinese Bible Church of College Park
- 實驗中文學校 Experimental Chinese School
- 黎明中文學校 The Li-Ming Chinese Academy
- 北維中文學校 Northern Virginia Chinese School
- 光華中文學校 Richmond Chinese School
- 洛城中文學校 Rockville Chinese School
- 駐美代表處中文學校 Taipei Economic and Cultural Representative Office (TECRO) Chinese School
- 華府慈濟人文學校 Tzu Chi Academy DC
- 華府台灣學校 Washington DC Taiwanese School
- 光啟中文學校 Washington Kuang Chi Chinese School
- 華府中文學校 Washington School of Chinese Language and Culture
- 維華中文學校 Wei Hwa Chinese School
- 明德中文學校 MingDe Mainline Chinese School
- 中華文化藝術學會 Chinese Cultural & Arts Institute

== See also ==
- Association of Chinese Schools, 57 member schools in the East Coast of the United States
