= Vice Minister of Foreign Affairs (South Korea) =

- Emblem of the Government of Republic of Korea
- Incumbent; Park Yoon-Joo and Kim Jina
- Ministry of Foreign Affairs
- Appointer: President

The Vice Minister of Foreign Affairs (Korean: 외교부차관; RR: Oegyobuchagwan) is a position within the Ministry of Foreign Affairs that assists the Minister and holds the rank next to the Minister.

Since the organizational restructuring in 2005, it has been organized under a multiple vice minister system. The First Vice Minister is in charge of bilateral diplomacy, and the Second Vice Minister is in charge of multilateral diplomacy.

== List of vice ministers of foreign affairs (1948-1998) ==
Government	No.	Name	Term of Office
First Republic	1	Ko Chang-il	August 9, 1948 – February 3, 1949
First Republic	2	Cho Jung-hwan	March 7, 1949 – July 7, 1951
First Republic	3	Park Am	July 10, 1951 – August 1951
First Republic	4	Gal Hong-gi	February 1952 – October 1952
First Republic	5	Cho Jung-hwan	October 1952 – July 29, 1955
First Republic	6	Kim Dong-jo	May 3, 1957 – September 12, 1959
First Republic	7	Choi Kyu-hah	September 12, 1959 – May 11, 1960
Heo Jeong Cabinet	8	Lee Soo-young	May 11, 1960 – August 23, 1960
Second Republic	9	Woo Hee-chang	August 23, 1960 – January 30, 1961
Second Republic	9	Kim Yong-shik	August 30, 1960 – May 10, 1961
Second Republic	10	Kim Jae-soon	January 30, 1961 – May 3, 1961
Second Republic	10	Lee Soo-young	June 16, 1961 – July 7, 1961
Second Republic	11	Park Dong-jin	July 7, 1961 – October 11, 1961
Second Republic	12	Lee Won-kyung	October 11, 1961 – August 28, 1962
Second Republic	13	Choi Moon-kyung	August 28, 1962 – December 17, 1963
Third Republic	14	Jung Il-young	December 17, 1963 – October 19, 1964
Third Republic	15	Moon Deok-joo	October 19, 1964 – October 22, 1965
Third Republic	16	Kim Young-joo	October 22, 1965 – September 22, 1967
Third Republic	17	Jin Pil-sik	September 22, 1967 – December 8, 1969
Third Republic	18	Yoon Seok-heon	December 8, 1969 – February 4, 1974
Fourth Republic	18	Yoon Seok-heon	December 8, 1969 – February 4, 1974
Fourth Republic	19	Roh Shin-young	February 11, 1974 – March 9, 1976
Fourth Republic	20	Yoon Ha-jung	March 9, 1976 – May 27, 1978
Fourth Republic	21	Lee Min-yong	May 27, 1978 – May 26, 1980
Fourth Republic	22	Kim Dong-hwi	May 26, 1980 – May 24, 1982
Fifth Republic	22	Kim Dong-hwi	May 26, 1980 – May 24, 1982
Fifth Republic	23	Roh Jae-won	May 24, 1982 – March 3, 1984
Fifth Republic	24	Lee Sang-ok	March 3, 1984 – September 5, 1986
Fifth Republic	25	Oh Jae-hee	September 5, 1986 – September 5, 1987
Fifth Republic	26	Park Ssang-yong	September 5, 1987 – March 4, 1988
Roh Tae-woo Government	27	Shin Dong-won	March 5, 1988 – December 29, 1989
Roh Tae-woo Government	28	Yoo Chong-ha	December 29, 1989 – February 27, 1992
Roh Tae-woo Government	29	Roh Chang-hee	February 27, 1992 – March 3, 1993
Kim Young-sam Government	30	Hong Soon-young	March 4, 1993 – May 23, 1994
Kim Young-sam Government	31	Park Geon-woo	May 23, 1994 – January 17, 1995
Kim Young-sam Government	32	Lee Si-young	January 20, 1995 – December 23, 1995
Kim Young-sam Government	33	Lee Ki-joo	December 23, 1995 – March 3, 1998

== List of vice ministers of foreign affairs and trade (1998-2013) ==
=== Vice Ministers of Foreign Affairs and Trade ===
President	No.	Name	Term of Office
Kim Dae-jung	1	Sun Joon-young	March 8, 1998 – January 27, 2000
Kim Dae-jung	2	Ban Ki-moon	January 27, 2000 – April 1, 2001
Kim Dae-jung	3	Choi Sung-hong	April 1, 2001 – February 3, 2002
Kim Dae-jung	4	Kim Hang-kyung	February 4, 2002 – March 3, 2003
Roh Moo-hyun	5	Kim Jae-seob	March 3, 2003 – January 28, 2004
Roh Moo-hyun	6	Choi Young-jin	January 28, 2004 – December 27, 2004
Roh Moo-hyun	7	Lee Tae-sik	December 27, 2004 – July 22, 2005

=== First Vice Ministers of Foreign Affairs and Trade ===
President	No.	Name	Term of Office
Roh Moo-hyun	8	Lee Tae-sik	July 22, 2005 – September 29, 2005
Roh Moo-hyun	9	Yu Myung-hwan	September 29, 2005 – December 1, 2006
Roh Moo-hyun	10	Cho Joong-pyo	December 1, 2006 – February 29, 2008
Lee Myung-bak	11	Kwon Jong-rak	February 29, 2008 – November 13, 2009
Lee Myung-bak	12	Shin Kak-soo	November 14, 2009 – February 8, 2011
Lee Myung-bak	13	Park Suk-hwan	February 9, 2011 – March 2, 2012
Lee Myung-bak	14	Ahn Ho-young	March 2, 2012 – March 13, 2013

==== Second Vice Ministers of Foreign Affairs and Trade ====
President	No.	Name	Term of Office
Roh Moo-hyun	8	Yu Myung-hwan	August 1, 2005 – September 29, 2005
Roh Moo-hyun	9	Lee Kyu-hyung	September 29, 2005 – November 30, 2006
Roh Moo-hyun	10	Kim Ho-young	December 1, 2006 – February 29, 2008
Lee Myung-bak	11	Kim Sung-hwan	February 29, 2008 – June 30, 2008
Lee Myung-bak	12	Shin Kak-soo	July 1, 2008 – November 14, 2009
Lee Myung-bak	13	Chun Yung-woo	November 14, 2009 – October 26, 2010
Lee Myung-bak	14	Min Dong-seok	October 27, 2010 – March 2, 2012
Lee Myung-bak	15	Kim Sung-han	March 2, 2012 – March 13, 2013

== List of vice ministers of foreign affairs (2013-present) ==
=== First Vice Ministers of Foreign Affairs ===
President	No.	Name	Term of Office
Park Geun-hye	1	Kim Kyou-hyun	March 13, 2013 – February 4, 2014
Park Geun-hye	Acting	Lee Kyung-soo	February 5, 2014 – February 26, 2014
Park Geun-hye	2	Cho Tae-yong	February 27, 2014 – October 20, 2015
Park Geun-hye	3	Lim Sung-nam	October 21, 2015 – September 27, 2018
Moon Jae-in	3	Lim Sung-nam	October 21, 2015 – September 27, 2018
Moon Jae-in	4	Cho Hyun	September 28, 2018 – May 23, 2019
Moon Jae-in	5	Cho Sei-young	May 23, 2019 – August 14, 2020
Moon Jae-in	6	Choi Jong-kun	August 18, 2020 – May 9, 2022
Yoon Suk Yeol	7	Cho Hyun-dong	May 10, 2022 – April 13, 2023
Yoon Suk Yeol	8	Jang Ho-jin	April 14, 2023 – December 31, 2023
Yoon Suk Yeol	9	Kim Hong-kyun	January 1, 2024 – June 10, 2025
Lee Jae-myung	10	Park Yoon-joo	June 11, 2025 – Present

==== Second Vice Ministers of Foreign Affairs ====
President	No.	Name	Term of Office
Park Geun-hye	1	Cho Tae-yul	March 13, 2013 – November 17, 2016
Park Geun-hye	2	Ahn Chong-ghee	November 18, 2016 – May 31, 2017
Moon Jae-in
Moon Jae-in	3	Cho Hyun	June 1, 2017 – September 27, 2018
Moon Jae-in	4	Lee Tae-ho	September 28, 2018 – December 24, 2020
Moon Jae-in	5	Choi Jong-moon	December 25, 2020 – May 9, 2022
Yoon Suk Yeol	6	Lee Do-hoon	May 10, 2022 – July 2, 2023
Yoon Suk Yeol	7	Oh Young-joo	July 3, 2023 – December 28, 2023
Yoon Suk Yeol	8	Kang In-sun	January 10, 2024 – June 10, 2025
Lee Jae-myung	9	Kim Jina	June 11, 2025 – Present
