= Koreans in Argentina =

Ethnic group

Korean Argentines
한국계 아르헨티나인 (Korean) Coreano-argentinos (Spanish)
- (Argentina) (South Korea)
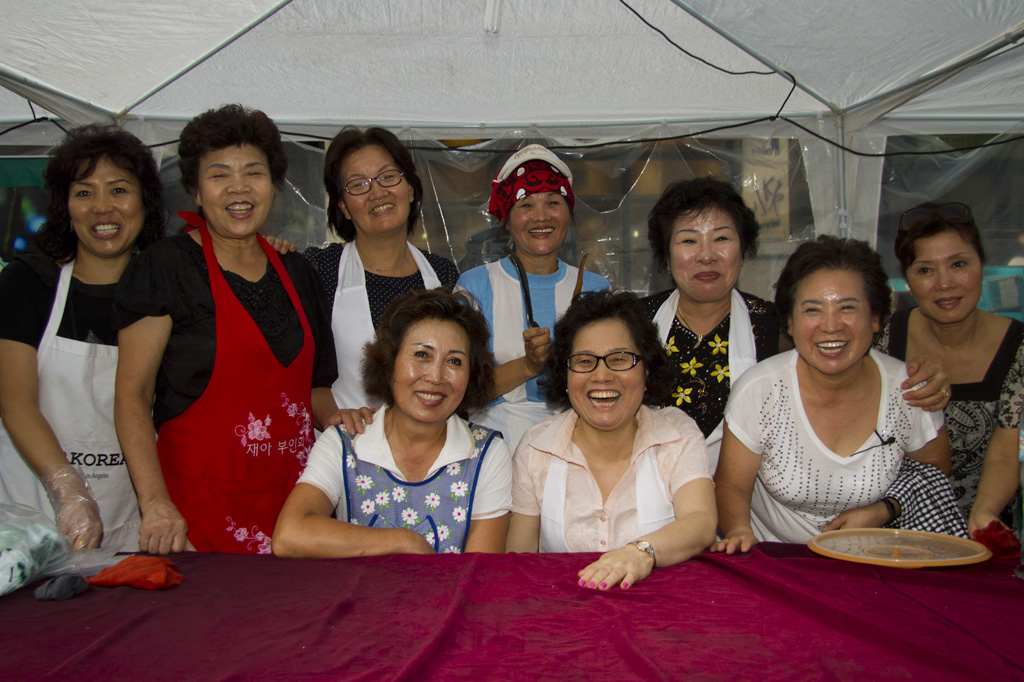
- Korean Argentines at the Korean stand of the 2012 Gastronomic Patio held in Buenos Aires

Total population
- 9,579 (by birth, 2023); 50,000-100,000 (total of Ancestry)

Regions with significant populations
- Buenos Aires, especially Flores and Balvanera (formerly known as Once)

Languages
- Spanish · Korean (minority)

Religion
- Majority: Protestantism; Minority: Catholicism and Buddhism

Related ethnic groups
- Koreans · Korean Americans · Korean Brazilians · Korean Uruguayans

Koreans in Argentina (also known as Argentine Koreans or Korean Argentines) form the second-largest Korean diaspora community in South America and the 16th largest in the world, according to the statistics of South Korea's Ministry of Foreign Affairs and Trade. Their population declined by more than 50% between 1997 and 2003. Despite the small rebound in their numbers since then, they have been surpassed in size by the rapidly growing Chinese Argentine community (which since the 1990s has been increasing non-stop and is expected to become one of the biggest immigrant groups in Argentina, together with Paraguayan, Bolivian and Peruvian immigrants). In the 2010s decade, the Korean community in Argentina has fallen behind Korean communities in Australia, New Zealand, the United Kingdom, the United States, Brazil, Canada, Singapore, The United Arab Emirates, and Southeast Asia.

Nevertheless, the relevance of the community and especially its weight among the Korean communities has been hailed on more than one occasion. For example, the Centro Cultural Coreano-Argentino (Korean-Argentine Cultural Center) was created with its headquarters precisely in Argentina.

== Migration history ==
=== Beginnings ===
Records still exist that show the presence of a few Koreans in Argentina as early as 1940, when Korea was still a Japanese colony. However, the first well-known Korean migrants to Argentina were twelve North Korean prisoners of the Korean War who declined the repatriation offered them under the terms of the Korean Armistice Agreement and chose instead to start a new life on another continent; they were finally resettled in Argentina in 1956 and 1957 by the United Nations High Commissioner for Refugees.

South Koreans first came to Argentina in the 1960s, under an intergovernmental agreement between the two countries. The first ones began arriving in 1962 as re-migrants from among the communities of Koreans in Paraguay and Koreans in Chile. However, the date most often identified as the start of Korean migration to Argentina is 14 October 1965, when a group of thirteen families from Busan arrived by ship in Buenos Aires en route to Choele Choel in Río Negro Province. Between 1970 and 1978, five hundred more families, totalling 2,800 individuals, arrived in Argentina, with the Argentine government specifically intending them to settle in less-developed rural areas of Argentina. They were supposed to have agricultural experience in Korea; however, few actually did. Due to the lack of economic infrastructure and employment opportunities in those regions, they resettled in urban centres.

=== Mass migration and re-migration ===
The largest and most noticeable influx of Korean immigrants to Argentina began in the 1980s. The total number of migrants between 1965 and 1985 only amounted to roughly 6,000 but began to increase sharply after that. By that time, South Korea was a modern and industrialised country, but the sharp recession provided a significant push factor for overseas migration; the signing of the Acto de Procedimiento between the Argentine and South Korean governments that year established and outlet for that migration. Obtaining residency was not cheap; businesspeople who sought to establish themselves and obtain a residency permit had to invest US$100,000. The population peaked at an estimated 50,000 individuals in 1996.

In the late 1990s, migration largely came to a halt, and the size of the community began to decrease; there were a few cases of new migrants who came for family reunification , and some others were deported from the country, but the largest cause of the diminution of the community was re- migration, largely to Canada and the United States. The most common destination in the U.S., not just for Koreans but for others leaving Argentina, was Miami, Florida, already home to a thriving pan-Latino community. Due to their multilingual skills and business experience, Koreans typically fared better in the job market than other emigrants from Argentina. The push for emigration was amplified with the onset of the 1999 Argentine economic crisis. After reaching a nadir of 15,500 individuals in 2003, the population recovered to 19,171 in 2005 and then 22,024 in 2009. The Korean population remained roughly stable at 22,354 people in 2011; among these, 7,420 were Argentine nationals, 14,340 had permanent residency, four were international students, and 590 had other types of visas. Almost 90% (19,864 people) were recorded as living in Buenos Aires or its vicinity.

== Employment ==
Many of the Korean immigrants who arrived in the 1980s possessed professional qualifications in fields as diverse as pharmacy, accounting, and history; however, due to the language barrier, and also the desire to get the maximum return from the capital they had invested in Argentina, they went into small businesses in which all members of the family could contribute their labour. Textile importation and clothing manufacturing was a widespread choice. Korean business owners took advantage of intra-ethnic networks both to find additional labourers, and also to gain access to further capital, in the form of rotating credit associations. In the 1990s, members of the locally educated 1.5 and second generations moved away from small business and again branched out into the professions which their parents had abandoned, typically medicine, fashion design, and architecture.

== Inter-ethnic relations ==
Koreans in Argentina are better-integrated with the local population than Koreans in Paraguay, but less so than Korean Brazilians. Argentines initially perceived Koreans as hard-working, intelligent, and honest, but their image took a turn for the worse in the 1980s, precisely as more began arriving in the country—instead, they came to be viewed as exploiters and opportunists. Koreans' entry into the textile industry provided ample fuel for ethnic friction as they outcompeted their co-industrialists through hard work, consisting of twelve- to fourteen-hour days, and use of cheap labour, limited not just to family members but, in some publicized cases, illegal immigrants from neighbouring Bolivia as well. Xenophobic news reports falsely accused them of stealing electricity from power companies, thus cementing in the public mind the idea that the Korean immigrants thrived at the expense of the rest of Argentina. Since Argentina has a rigid class stratification system and their popular national identity is based on an exclusive European racial representation, Koreans inevitably stirred resentment towards their presence.

Children of Korean immigrants also had a difficult time getting accepted as Argentines due to their parents' poor command of the Spanish language, different food, and different customs such as taking off ones' shoes at the front door of the house. In a process common to ethnic minorities in all societies, the second generation conceived the values of the mainstream to be universal, while placing less worth on those of their ancestral culture. In response to their exclusion from the identity of "Argentine", youth of Korean descent often cling to a purely local identity, such as "Porteño" (used to refer to people from Buenos Aires), thus avoiding the need to categorise themselves by ethnicity or nationality. Ethnic Korean women are often fetishised by Argentine men.

In many cases, it is not until they go overseas, especially to the United States, that ethnic Koreans who grew up in Argentina are accepted as full Argentines; their Argentine accent functions as a marker of distinction and identity in the diverse Spanish-speaking community there.

== Culture ==
=== Language ===
Most Koreans in Argentina speak both Korean and Spanish, with varying degrees of proficiency. Argentina has five community-operated weekend schools which teach the Korean language as a heritage language to locally born ethnic Korean youth. In recent years, the schools have shifted towards offering cultural activities aimed at the mainstream, such as Korean language courses. Among youth, proficiency in the Korean language is an important marker of community belonging; those who never learned it well in childhood are often inspired by Korean cinema and Korean television dramas to study it more fully.

=== Religion ===
The majority of the Koreans in Argentina are Protestant, while small minorities follow Buddhism or the Roman Catholic faith of the mainstream. The country boasts a total of thirty Korean Protestant churches. The earliest ones, the Iglesia Unión Coreana en Argentina and the Iglesia Chae-Il—now one of the largest—were founded in 1966 and 1967, respectively. The one described as "most representative" of the population is the Misión Chung Ang (also known as the Iglesia Central), a Presbyterian church established in 1972. Korean churches were some of the first ethnic-specific churches in Argentina; however, despite their important function in maintaining Korean identity and culture among the immigrants and their children, they have not restricted themselves solely to the Korean community—for example, Chung Ang conduct missionary work in the poorer and more marginalised communities of the interior, especially in Misiones.

=== K-Pop ===
In recent years, many Argentine youth have become interested in Korean culture due to the rise of K-pop. The Korean Cultural Center in Buenos Aires sponsors the largest K-pop festival in Argentina and it attracts thousands of participants every year. In 2017, participants arrived from 16 different countries in Latin America.

=== Other traditions ===
Korean martial arts remain widely practised among the Korean community of Argentina, and have also made significant inroads in the rest of society. In addition to taekwondo, which has a following in numerous countries, the globally less-common shippalgi is quite well known in Argentina, practised actively by more than 70,000 people. Its growth largely resulted from the 1970 immigration to Argentina of Yoo Soo-nam, one of the world's foremost masters in the art. The efforts of Yoo, who taught shippalgi at the Colegio Militar de Campo de Mayo from 1971 until 1980, resulted in its adoption by the Special Operations Group of the Federal Police.

Argentine asado (grilled meat) is popular among Koreans just as among other communities, but they typically eat it with kimchi as a side dish rather than the more common salads or French fries.

In 2005, the Club Deportivo Coreano (Korean Sports Club) was founded in Lobos, Buenos Aires which plays Football, this is quite common with immigrant communities in Argentina, since the Spanish, Italian and Armenian communities already had clubs of their own. They play in the fifth division league, Torneo Argentino C.

The Kim Yun Shin Museum of Fine Arts, Argentina's first art museum of Korean motif, opened its doors on 8 December 2008. The institution, located at 2945 Felipe Vallese St. in the Floresta District, was created on the initiative of Kim Yun Shin, a South Korean painter who graduated from Seoul's Hongik University and has resided in Buenos Aires since 1984.

== Education ==
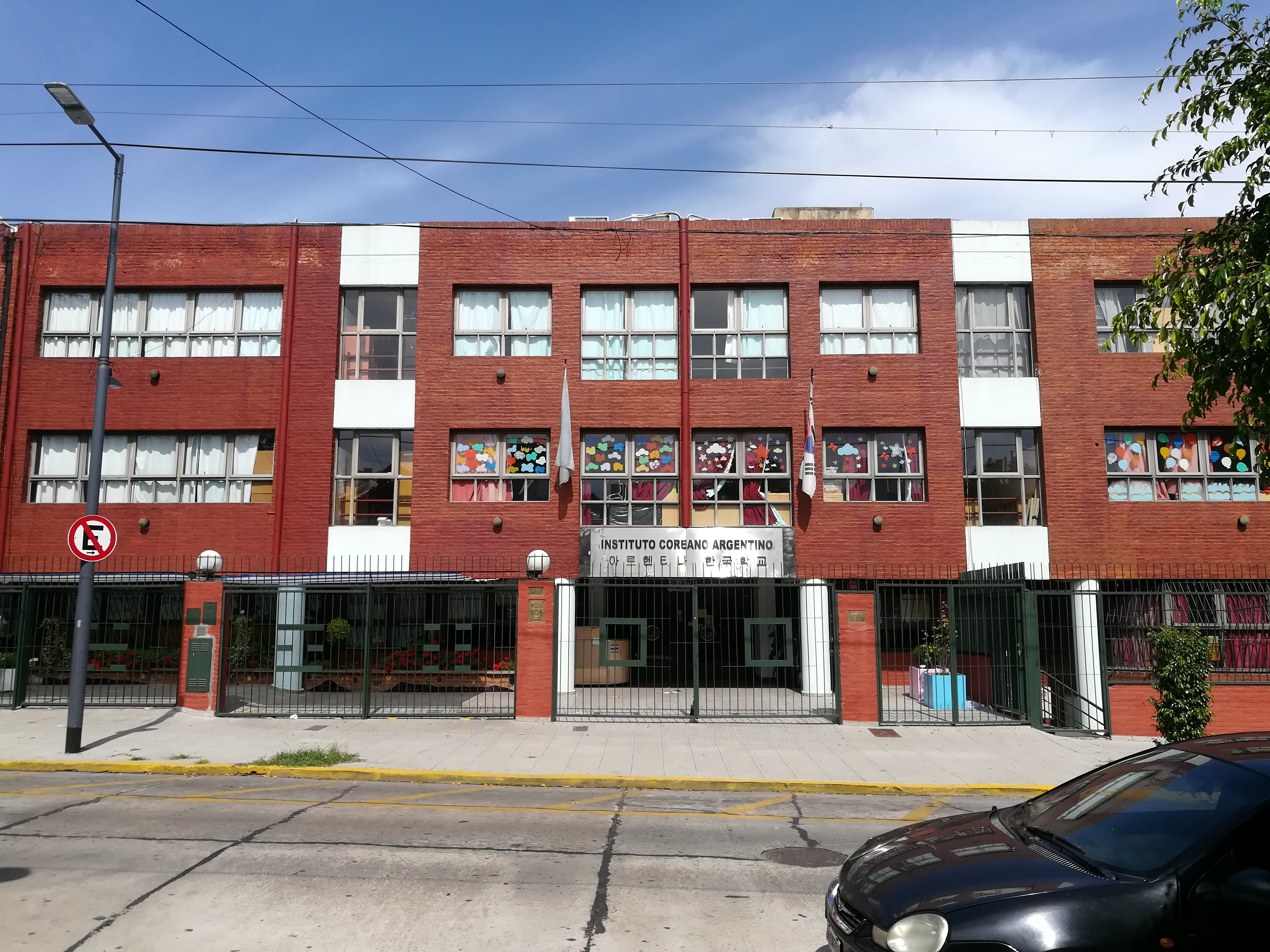
Instituto Coreano Argentino

Instituto Coreano Argentino, a South Korean international school, is in Buenos Aires.

== Cenotaph ==
A cenotaph honoring the first arrival of korean immigrants in argentina stands in LaMarque.

== Notable individuals ==
- Leonardo Nam, Hollywood actor born in Buenos Aires to Korean immigrant parents
- Chang Kim Sung, known for his role in the television series Graduados
- Jae Park, lead singer of rock band Day6

== See also ==
- East Asian Argentines
- Korean diaspora
- Immigration to Argentina
