= South Korea–Uruguay relations =

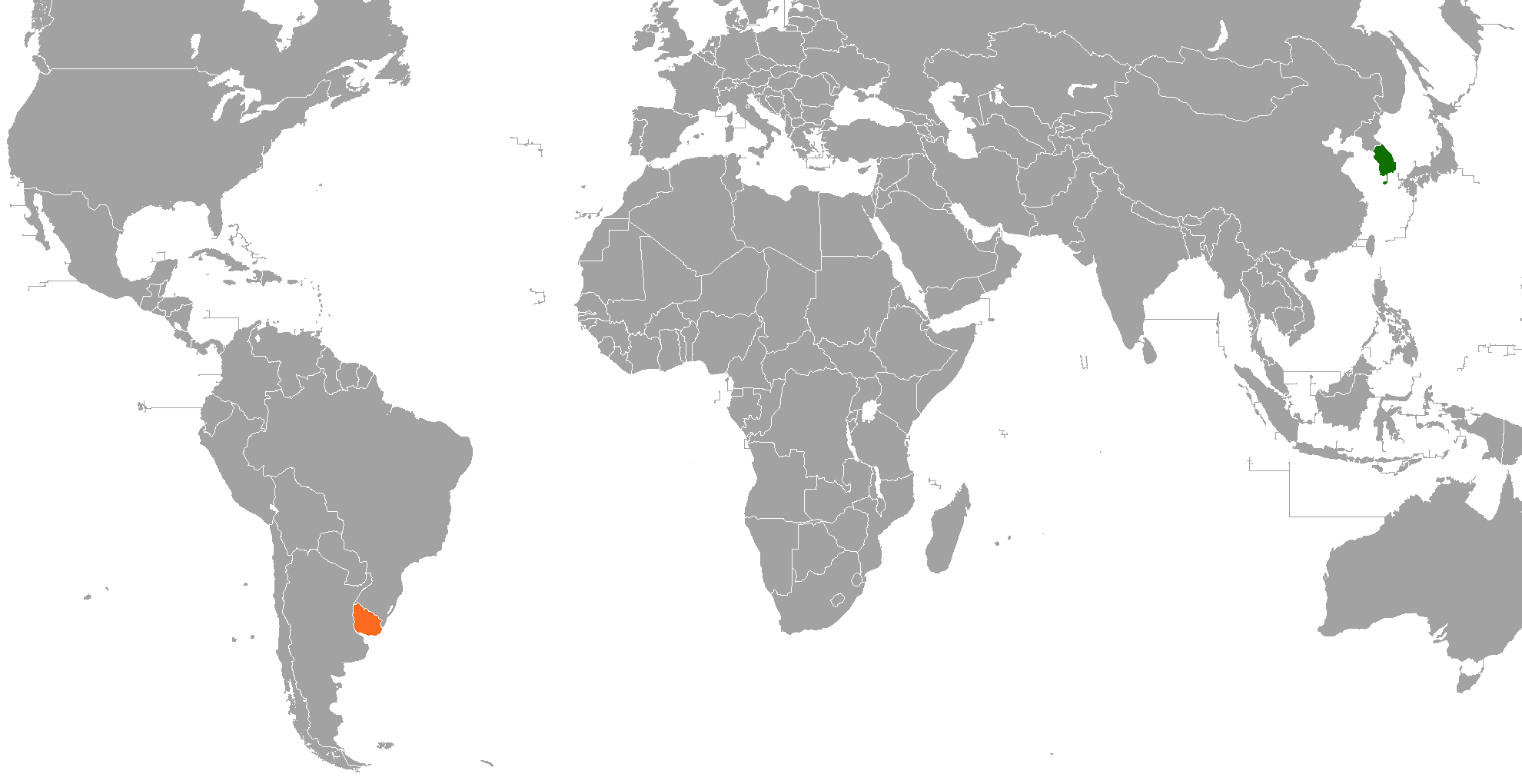
- South Korea: Uruguay

Foreign relations between the Republic of Korea and Uruguay were established in 1964. South Korea has an embassy in Montevideo. Uruguay has an embassy in Seoul.

Both countries are members of the Group of 77.

South Korea is also an important trading partner for Uruguay.

== Korean Uruguayans ==
Koreans in Uruguay
Coreanos en Uruguay

Total population
- 130

Regions with significant populations
- Montevideo

Languages
- Rioplatense Spanish, Korean

Related ethnic groups
- Korean diaspora

Korean Uruguayans, numbering 130 individuals, formed the 19th-largest Korean community in Latin America as of 2005, according to the statistics of South Korea's Ministry of Foreign Affairs and Trade.

=== Migration history ===
The first Korean immigrants to Uruguay were ten families, totalling 45 persons, admitted in March 1975 to work in the agricultural sector. However, most of them later emigrated to Argentina and Paraguay. Since 1980, a total of 140 Koreans have naturalised as Uruguayan citizens, although many are not resident in the country any longer. The population is transient and fluctuates in size; the peak months of Korean presence in Uruguay are June, July, November and December.

=== Employment ===
Most Koreans live in and around Montevideo, where some work as fishermen, while others are involved in the textile industry. The fishermen are almost all from Busan; they earn between US$1,000 and US$1,500 a month, while the engineers on their boats receive US$3,000-4,000 and the captain may make as much as US$6,000. The fishermen often work in dangerous conditions and face language barriers. In February 2007, three Korean fishermen were killed in an explosion on board a fishing boat, along with their Vietnamese colleague. There are several Korean-run restaurants and noraebang (karaoke bars) in Montevideo. As of 2013, there are 15 South Korean citizens registered in the Uruguayan social security.

=== Religion ===
South Korean missionaries of the Church of the Brethren, a Protestant denomination, have been evangelising among Korean fishermen in Uruguay for almost 20 years. One of their earliest converts from among the fishermen, Simon Lee, eventually left the fishing industry to devote himself to religious work; in 2004, he and ten others established a Korean church in Montevideo, which also aimed to serve fishermen from other Asian countries as well.

== High Level Visits ==
In January 2011 , South Korean Prime Minister Kim Hwang-sik visited Uruguay, meeting with President José Mujica and Vice President Danilo Astori to discuss bilateral relations and the commercialization of Uruguayan beef.

In November 2016, Uruguayan Foreign Minister Rodolfo Nin Novoa paid an official visit to Seoul, where he met with his South Korean counterpart, Vice Minister of Trade, Industry and Energy Woo Tae-hee, and National Assembly Vice Speaker Shim Jae-chul to discuss Mercosur–South Korea free trade negotiations, infrastructure investment, and Korean Peninsula security issues, while also signing a bilateral Customs Cooperation Agreement.

In October 2022, South Korean Prime Minister Han Duck-soo made a two-day official visit to Montevideo, meeting with President Luis Lacalle Pou to discuss Mercosur trade negotiations, bilateral economic cooperation, and South Korea's bid to host the 2030 World Expo.

In November 2026, Uruguayan Vice Minister of Foreign Affairs Valeria Csukasi visited Seoul, meeting with South Korean First Vice Foreign Minister Park Yoon-joo and Trade Minister Park Jung-sung. Discussions focused on resuming stalled South Korea–Mercosur free trade agreement negotiations ahead of the 69th Mercosur Summit hosted by Uruguay in December 2026, alongside bilateral cooperation in artificial intelligence, critical mineral supply chains, and broader economic relations.

== See also ==
- Foreign relations of South Korea
- Foreign relations of Uruguay
- Koreans in Uruguay
