= Kim Yong-il (disambiguation) =

Kim Yong-il (born 1944) is a North Korean politician who acted as Premier (2007–2010).

Kim Yong-il may also refer to:

- Kim Yong-il (politician, born 1947), deputy foreign minister of North Korea
- Kim Yong-il (1955-2000), a son of Kim Jong Il
- Kim Yong-il (footballer) (born 1994), North Korean midfielder

== See also ==
- Kim Jong-il (1941/1942–2011), leader of North Korea (1994–2011)
- Kim Jong-il (athlete) (born 1962), South Korean retired long jumper
