= South-North Basic Agreement =

1991 North–South Korea agreement

- The Korean Peninsula Flag (Unification Flag) – This flag symbolizes efforts for reconciliation and cooperation between North and South Korea.
- Signed: 13 December 1991
- Location: Seoul, South Korea
- Effective: 19 February 1992
- Condition: Ratification by both North and South Korea
- Signatories: North Korea , South Korea
- Language: Korean

The Agreement on Reconciliation, Non-Aggression, and Exchanges and Cooperation Between South and North Korea (Korean: 남북사이의 화해와 불가침 및 교류·협력에 관한 합의서), also known as the South-North Basic Agreement (남북 기본합의서), was an agreement that aimed to regulate the relations between the two states to promote peaceful coexistence and cooperation on the Korean Peninsula. It was signed on December 13, 1991 by representatives of North Korea and South Korea and went into effect on February 19, 1992.

The agreement focused on three spheres of diplomacy in the Korean Peninsula. Reconciliation would ensure both sides were committed to coexisting side by side without interfering in each other's domestic affairs, international competition or sabotage (articles 1–6). The Non-aggression section of the agreement laid steps to prevent escalation of disputes by opening channels of direct communication, promoting demilitarisation, and building trust (articles 9–10). Finally, the section on Exchanges and Cooperation of the agreement hoped to facilitate economic cooperation, trade, and cultural exchanges. It included provisions for freer transit of people, goods, and ideas between the two sides (articles 15–23).

The talks were part of a broader set of north–south discussions and demilitarisation efforts that intensified towards the end of the Cold War. Negotiations formally began in 1990, with five rounds of high-level talks between Seoul (South Korea) and Pyongyang (North Korea) before the agreement was finalized in 1991. The discussions were conducted alongside negotiations on the Joint Declaration on the Denuclearization of the Korean Peninsula, which was signed in January 1992.

Since 2023, North Korean leader Kim Jong-Un has expressed North Korea's intention designate South Korea as a hostile country, representing a set back of over three decades for the non-aggression and cooperation between the two countries.

== Background ==
The relations between the Republic of Korea (South Korea) and the Democratic People's Republic of Korea (North Korea) began to shift considerably in the late 1980s to early 1990s towards the end of the Cold War. Despite the shift from a bipolar Cold War world to a U.S. unipolar system, new diplomatic relations were established involving the Korean peninsula and multipolar relations with the United States, China, Russia, and Japan.

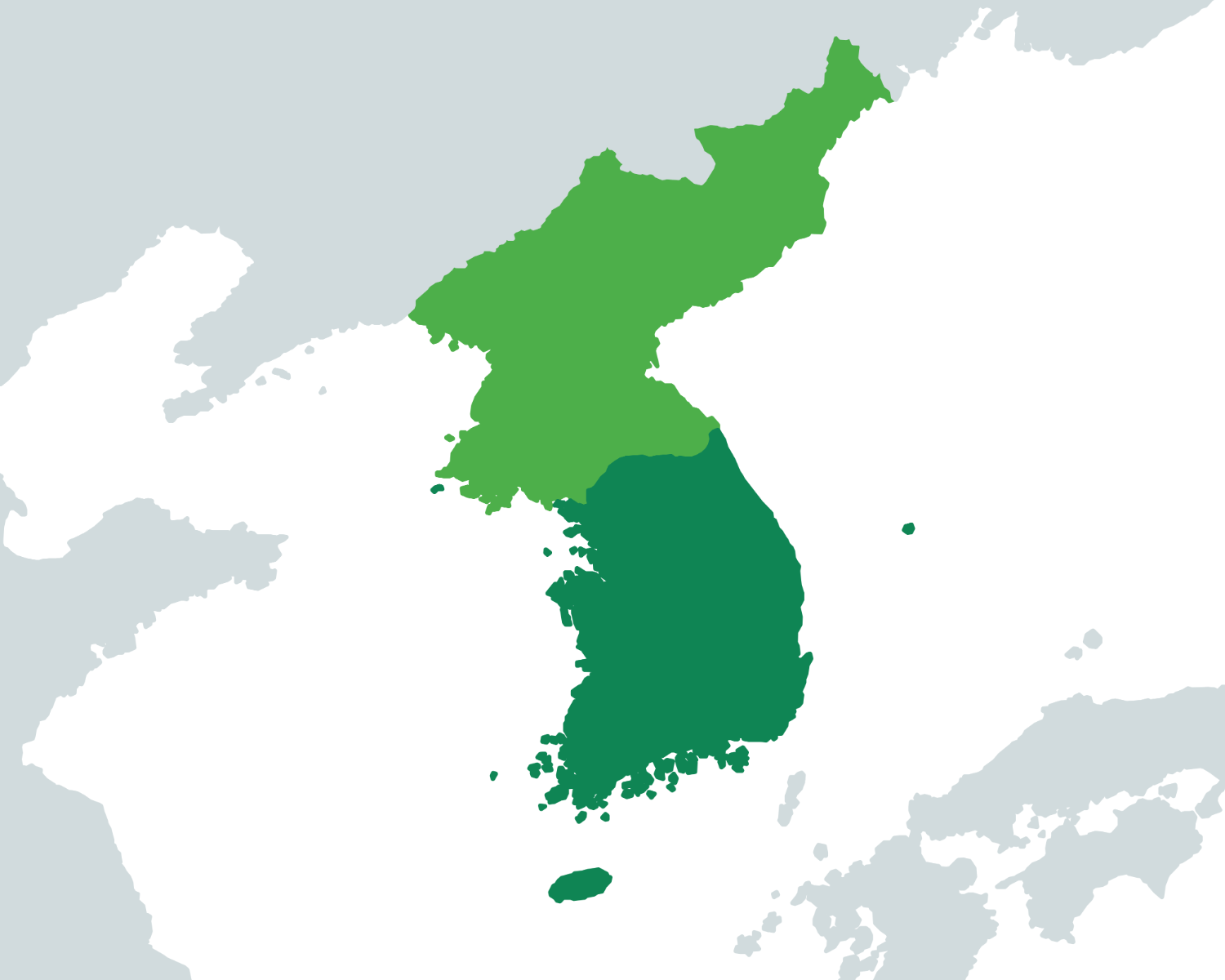
Joint map of Republic of Korea and Democratic People's Republic of Korea.

Additionally, the 1987 Democratization Movement in South Korea led to a shift from military rule to civilian governance under President Roh Tae-woo. This shift created widespread political and civil liberation throughout South Korea, leading to major changes in domestic policy and Inter-Korean relations. While it weakened the Cold War division system, it also created new internal divisions within South Korea regarding the best approach to North Korea.

The July 7th Declaration (1988), or the “Declaration for National Self-Reliance, Unification, and Prosperity,” changed South Korea's approach to inter-Korean relations. The declaration was issued by the Roh Tae-woo government marking a transition from Cold War confrontation to a policy of engagement and coexistence with North Korea. Both the Democratization Movement of 1987 and changing global dynamics throughout the late 1980s were influential to the Agreements development.

The new diplomatic relations and talks contributed to the joint ascension of North and South Korea to UN membership in September 1991 after a long period of competition and disagreement about whether they should pursue individual memberships or focus on unification.

The government of South Korea and the United States maintained close ties at the time and an important concern was the demobilization of the American military presence in South Korea. North Korea maintained that withdrawal of American nuclear weapons from South Korea was essential before it allowed international agents to inspect its facilities for nuclear arms manufacturing. Meanwhile, the United States and South Korea held the position that one issue should not be dependent on the other, to which the government of South Korea added that any American troop reduction would only be considered if the threat posed by North Korea was addressed. Regardless, in October 1991, they reached an agreement to completely withdraw the tactical nuclear weapons from the peninsula and President Roh Tae-woo declared that South Korea will no longer keep a nuclear weapons arsenal or domestic production.

== Negotiations ==
=== Signed by ===
- South Korea (ROK):Chung Won-shik (정원식)
  - Prime Minister of the Republic of Korea
  - Chief delegate of the South delegation to the South-North High-Level Talks.
- North Korea (DPRK):Yon Hyong-muk (연형묵)
  - Premier of the Administration Council of the Democratic People’s Republic of Korea
  - Head of the North delegation to the South-North High-Level Talks.

The South-North Basic Agreement was signed by the representatives of both sides on December 13, 1991, after five rounds of talks and on February 19, 1992, they met in Pyongyang to formalize and finalize the negotiation. Significantly, the talks also confirmed that the 1953 Korean Armistice Agreement that was implemented with support from United Nations forces would stay in place until a formal peace treaty was implemented.

The signing of the Agreement marked a shift from a period of armistice to a period where they aimed to coexist peacefully. It was recognized by both sides as an important step to peace and reunification of the peninsula despite lacking provisions around nuclear weapons.

== Treaty content ==
=== 1. Reconciliation ===
- Both sides agreed to recognize, respect, and not interfere with each other's systems and domestic affairs (Articles 1 & 2).
- Commit to coexist side by side so the armistice could evolve into lasting peace (Article 5).
- Cease vilifying each other (Article 3).
- Cease attempts to sabotage each other (Article 4).
- Cease competing or confronting each other internationally (Article 6).

=== 2. Non-aggression ===
- Agreed to refrain from the use of force and to resolve disputes peacefully (Articles 9 & 10).
- Pledge to establish a Commission to discuss and plan demilitarization efforts and build mutual confidence. Establishing a hotline between military authorities to prevent accidental clashes and conflict escalation (Articles 12 & 13).

=== 3. Exchanges and cooperation ===
- The agreement aimed to facilitate economic cooperation, trade, and cultural exchanges. Including:
  - Family reunions and free intra-Korea travels (Articles 17 & 18).
  - Re-establishing telecommunications, railways, sea and air routes, and postal facilities (Articles 19 & 20).
  - Scientific, technological, and economic cooperation domestically and in the international sphere (Articles 15, 16, 21).
  - Establishing commissions to facilitate implementations for specific sectors (Articles 22 & 23).

== International influence ==
Wavering trust between North and South was heavily influenced by foreign military and economic conditions. Outside influence particularly from the United States reinforced shaky relations between the North and South due to leaning support and military presence from the US in the South preceding the Agreement. The United States reinforcement in the South aimed towards containing North Korea due to fears of increasing nuclear arms, global threat, and mistrust. As well, the US deemed denuclearization on the Peninsula a global rather than a regional issue, and thus its involvement was shaped by its arms race with North Korea and a motivation to manage its nuclear developments.

Prior to the North-South Basic Agreement in 1991, peace negotiations pushed forward by North Korea called for the withdrawal of US troops in the South, as well as the reduction of overall military for an armistice agreement, due to the South enjoying protection under the U.S. Nuclear umbrella. However, the alliance between the U.S. and South Korea bolstered its defensive military and provided the U.S. a linchpin partner in securing control in East Asia that deterred negotiations earlier on. The North-South Basic Agreement, in this regard, could be interpreted as successful due to the South's willingness to break ties with the U.S. by removing existing U.S. nuclear weapons, such as land and water-based tactical nuclear weapons, on South Korean soil. However, following the North-South Basic Agreement, the effectiveness proved to be more challenging as North Korea continued to build its nuclear arms.

In January 1992, North Korea joined the International Atomic Energy Agency (IAEA) on a “nuclear safeguard’s agreement” to permit inspections of Yongbyon, North Korea's major nuclear facility, and overall transparency of its nuclear development program. These inspections, however, were ineffective, as it ceased compliance with IAEA Nuclear non-proliferation (NPT) rules. Under these circumstances, Washington and Pyongyang entered negotiations on the nuclear issue and the political and economic effects and relations that could result from it. This led to the U.S's renewed presence in the Peninsula, and the conclusion of the Agreed Framework in October 1994: an agreement with North Korea that aimed to freeze North Korea's nuclear arms program, specifically by halting operation and construction of its nuclear facilities, work towards implementing the 1992 Joint Declaration, and permit IAEA monitoring of fuel extraction. In return, the U.S. agreed to arrange for supply light-water and power reactors and fuel.

Other countries had smaller influential roles in the agreement due to geopolitical impacts such as China, Japan, and Russia with a shared interest in denuclearization on the Korean Peninsula around 1991. China and Russia held stronger relationships with North Korea due to personal interests in economic and security buffers. Japan, also under the nuclear umbrella, remained rather neutral yet relied on US presence for stability due to its proximity to the Peninsula. Strategic relations before and after the agreement shaped the unification of the Korean Peninsula.

== Legacy and future cooperation ==
Symbolically recognized as a significant foundation for Korean unification and co-existence, the South-North Basic Agreement allowed Seoul and Pyongyang to reach a productive consensus where both sides would benefit from resolving political and military tensions, through exchange and cooperation, and by establishing a systematic governing mechanism, the first of its kind, to manage relations between the two regimes. Specifically, The South-North Basic Agreement aimed to reduce tensions and hostility between North and South Korea through reconciliatory, non-aggression and constructive commitments to disarmament; however, trust between the two parties became fragile. This agreement can be interpreted as the first to trigger future provisions to unify the Peninsula. However, despite these efforts, such as the creation of the South-North Joint Military Committee as a result of the Agreement, it quickly lost relevance as tensions built up immediately after signing, proving the negotiations from the Agreement to be less impactful than anticipated.

As the Basic Agreement omitted a nuclear accord, three weeks later, on 31 December 1991, the Agreement led to the creation of the Joint Declaration of the Denuclearization of the Korean Peninsula, the first agreement of its kind to denuclearize both North and South Korea, by prohibiting the testing, making, obtaining, keeping, or deploying of nuclear weapons, calling for transparency through mutual inspections of each state's nuclear facilities. As an outcome of the Agreement and North Korea's compliance with the Agreement terms, South Korea agreed to cancel its 1992 Team Spirit US-South Korean military exercises. The Joint Declaration also laid the groundwork for more denuclearization agreements to follow thereafter.

This agreement, however, was deemed unsuccessful as North Korea continued its nuclear development program, to which the U.S. became re-involved in an effort to defuse tensions on the Peninsula, namely by pursuing efforts to effectively pause North Korean developments on its nuclear program. The US's re-involvement led to the U.S. and North Korea's 1994, “Agreed Framework.”

Moreover, in 1995, North Korea's refusal to comply with transparency of its nuclear facilities outlined in the Agreement, such as the existence of a large reprocessing plant, and each side's failure to concretely implement the provisions in the Agreement, encouraged South Korean society's desire to revoke the Agreement in the name of achieving “nuclear sovereignty.”

=== Economic integration ===
South-North economic cooperation was (and still remains), a crucial tenet to this agreement, to allow for concrete opportunities on productive negotiation, reconciliation and collaboration to be fostered. In theory, economic cooperation would help strengthen North and South reactions through promoting the mutual interests on balanced development of the national economy and stimulate trade relations.

Compared to the “grand national unity” reunification visions for Korea from the July 4 South-North Joint Statement (the 1972 Communique), the 1991 Basic Agreement set out to delve deeper into the scopes and principles outlined in the Communique. This included more specific guidelines for increased economic integration including more open collaboration in natural resource development, commodity transactions, and joint venture projects. Furthermore, the Agreement outlined recommendations for infrastructural development, such as linking disconnected railways and highways, and opening new routes by air and sea; crucial whole-of-society establishments to encourage socio-economic integration and long-term cooperation.

Furthermore, the Agreement helped to encourage dialogue on future economic interests between the two countries such as natural resource development, linking railways, and highways, including prospects of joint venture projects in the future (pg 127→ citation). Following the signing of this Agreement, economic relations between the two regimes appeared to improve. From $22 million in 1989, the first year of direct trade, to $190 million in 1991 and $213 million in 1992, economic trade between the two regimes saw a steady upward trajectory.

Despite attempts made in the last three decades following the Basic Agreement, the efforts between the two states seem to be in reversal. In a speech delivered by North Korean leader Kim Jong-Un in Pyongyang in September 2024, he expressed North Korea's aims to revoke the 1991 Basic Agreement setting back any intentions of non-aggression and economic cooperation that were developing between both countries.
