= 外交部 =

外交部 may refer to:

- Ministry of Foreign Affairs of the People's Republic of China (Chinese: 中华人民共和国外交部)
- Ministry of Foreign Affairs (Singapore) (Chinese: 新加坡外交部)
- Ministry of Foreign Affairs (South Korea) (Korean: 대한민국 외교부; Hanja: 大韓民國外交部)
- Ministry of Foreign Affairs (Taiwan) (Chinese: 中華民國外交部)
