= Instituto Coreano Argentino =

- 아르헨티나한국학교

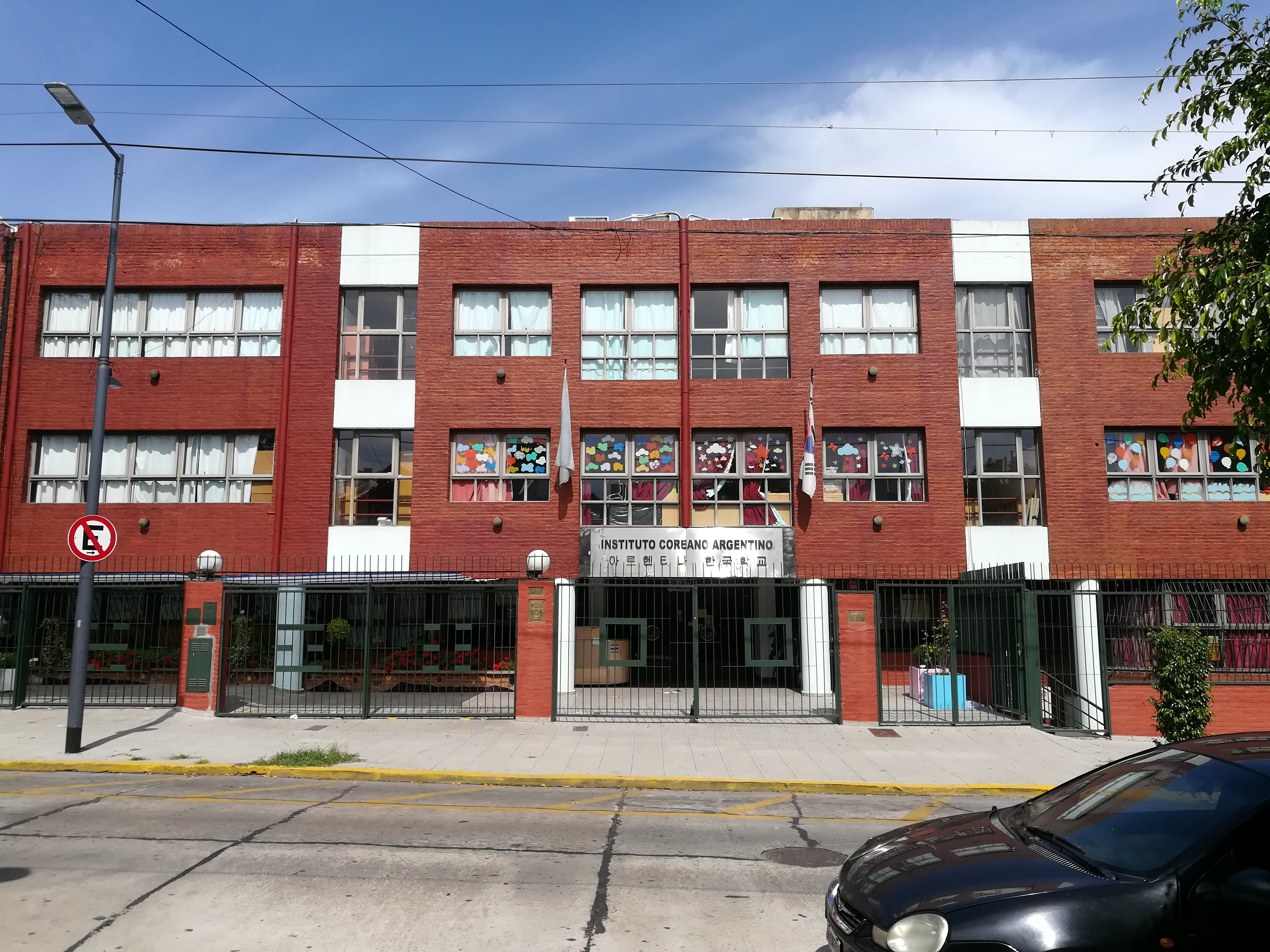

Location
- Asamblea 1840 Ciudad Autonoma de Buenos Aires Argentina CP C1406HVU; Buenos Aires; Argentina; 34.639273°S 58.44977299999999°W

Information
- Type: Primary school
- Website: e-ica.org

Instituto Coreano Argentino (ICA, "Argentina Korean School," Korean: 아르헨티나한국학교) is a Korean international school in Buenos Aires, Argentina. It serves the preschool and elementary school levels. In 2010 it had 29 teachers, 184 day kindergarten students, and 155 day elementary students. Its weekend school that year had 207 students. There are two principals, one each appointed by the Ministry of Education of Argentina and the Ministry of Education of South Korea.

Jaekeun Lee, author of the master's degree thesis "En búsqueda de una identidad coreana-argentina: Exploración y aproximación panorámica de los elementos identitarios del coreano-argentino a través del análisis de La peonia y su sombra," described ICA as an example of maintaining "Koreanism", (Note: Jaekun Lee refers to "Koreanity" (coreanidad in Spanish) as the physical features from people of Korean ethnicity and therefore immutable; while "Koreanism" (coreanismo in Spanish) as the inherited Korean culture and language, which can be a "Koreanism from Korea" (original cultural elements from Korean culture), "Koreanism in Argentina" result whether from the alternation between Korean and Argentine cultures or from transculturation, and a "false Koreanism", which emerges from the stereotypes of the Argentines, that the Korean-Argentine assumes.) that is, their Korean culture, language, and heritage in Argentina.

== History ==
It originated from the Korean School in Argentina, a weekend school established in 1976 and registered with the embassy of South Korea in 1977. The organization was founded in 1986. In this year, land was bought on which the ICA building would be built later.

The day school was established with funding from the South Korean government in 1995 with a curricula established and oversighted by the South Korean Ministry of Education, and the Argentine Ministry of Education gave formal approval to the enrollment of students in 1998, being added a morning school with the Argentine curricula taught in Spanish.

== Curriculum ==
The school has coursework in Korean, Spanish, and English, with subjects related to Korea in the first language. Lessons are taught from Monday to Friday in the morning and in the afternoon, where morning subjects are standard lessons according to the Argentine curricula such as mathematics, Spanish language, physical education, natural sciences or social sciences that are taught in the Spanish language, while afternoon subjects include English and Korean languages, Korean history, Korean art, and computing. All students are required to take taekwondo.

ICA offers Korean language lessons in the "Saturdays' school" ("Escuela de los sábados" in Spanish), which Korean-Argentine and Argentine people can attend.

== See also ==
- Koreans in Argentina
