= Park Yoon-joo =

South Korean diplomat (born 1970)

- 박윤주
- Park in 2026

10th First Vice Minister of Foreign Affairs
- Incumbent
- Assumed office 12 June 2025
- President: Lee Jae Myung
- Prime Minister: Kim Min-seok; Han Seong-sook
- Preceded by: Kim Hong-kyun

Personal details
- Born: 1970 (age 55–56) Boseong, South Korea
- Education: Seoul National University; George Washington University

Park Yoon-joo (Korean: 박윤주; born 1970) is a South Korean diplomat serving as the first vice minister of foreign affairs.

== Early life and education ==
Park Yoon-joo was born in Boseong, South Jeolla Province, South Korea. He earned a bachelor's degree in diplomacy from Seoul National University, and received a master's degree in international trade and investment from George Washington University.

== Career ==
He began working at the Ministry of Foreign Affairs after passing the 29th High Deplomatic Service Examination in 1995. From August 2004, he served as a first secretary at the Embassy of South Korea, Washington, D.C.. From December 2011, he served as the head of the North America Division 2 at the Ministry. From July 2013, he served as deputy consul general at the Consulate General of the Republic of Korea in Boston, and from June 2016, he served as a counselor at the Embassy of the Republic of Korea in Australia. Since November 2018, he has served as a senior advisor at the North America Bureau of the Ministry of Foreign Affairs. He has been serving as the first vice minister of foreign affairs since June 2025.
