= Doryeom-dong =

- Interactive map of Doryeom-dong
- Country: South Korea

Area
  - Total: 0.03 km^{2} (0.012 sq mi)

Korean name
- Hangul: 도렴동
- Hanja: 都染洞
- RR: Doryeom-dong
- MR: Toryŏm-dong

Doryeom-dong (Korean: 도렴동) is a dong (neighborhood) of Jongno District, Seoul, South Korea. It is a legal dong (법정동) administered under its administrative dong (행정동), Sajik-dong. The name is originated from a governmental office named Doryeomseo (도렴서 都染署) in the region during the early period of Joseon dynasty.

== Government and infrastructure ==
The Ministry of Foreign Affairs previously had its headquarters in a facility in Doryeom-dong.

== See also ==
- Administrative divisions of South Korea
