= Chun Yung-woo =

South Korean politician (born 1952)

Chun Yung-woo (Korean: 천영우; born January 27, 1952) served 33 years as a diplomat in the Ministry of Foreign Affairs of South Korea including as the National Security Advisor in the Security Department in the Office of the President of the Republic of Korea.

Chun was born in Miryang, South Korea.

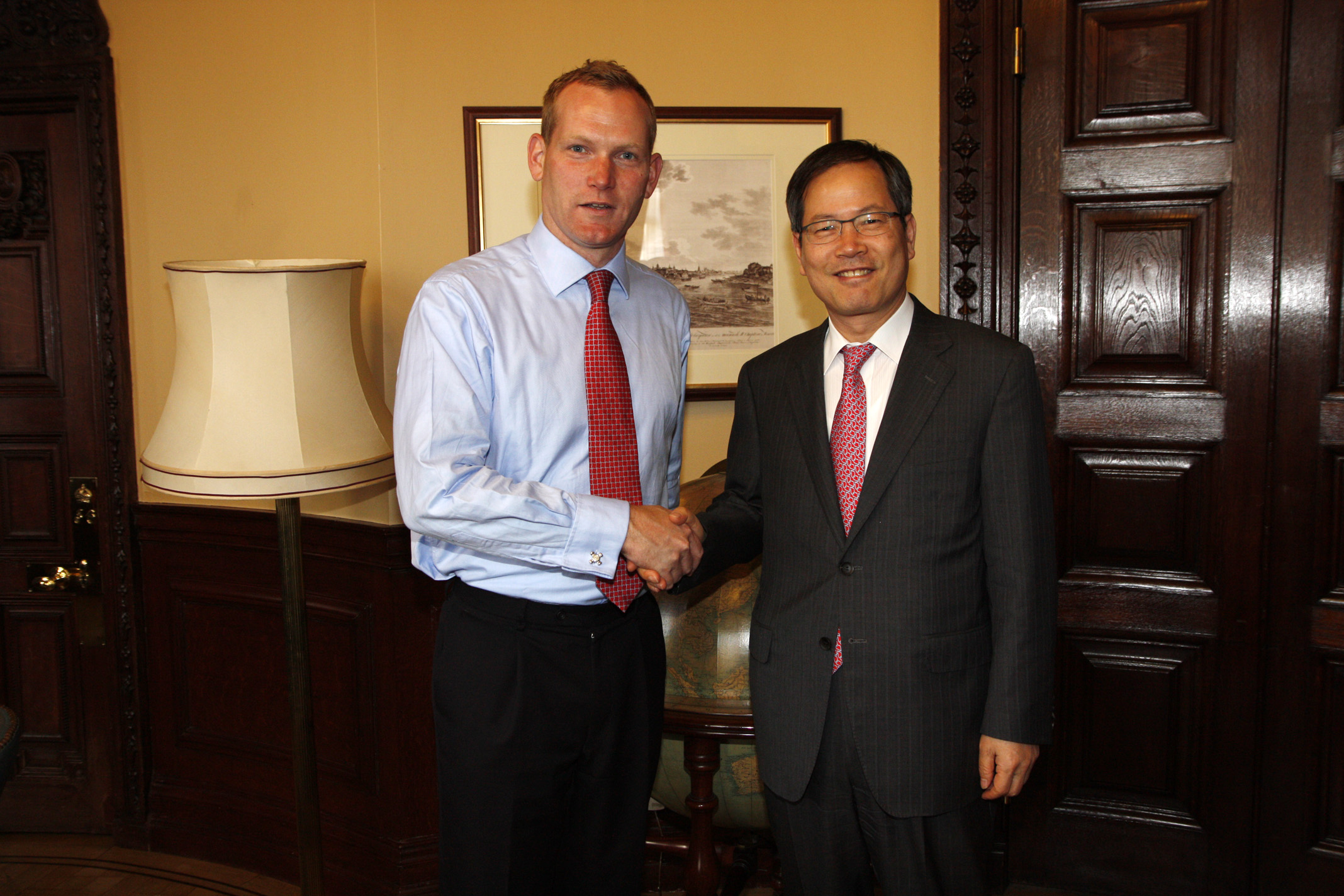

He graduated from Busan University majoring in French literature and received a master's degree from Columbia University. He has worked as a diplomat of South Korea for more than 30 years. He served as ambassador in the South Korean Embassy in the United Kingdom (May 2008 – November 2009) and became Deputy Minister of Foreign Affairs and Trade. He participated in the six-party talks on the North Korean nuclear program as Chief Negotiator for South Korea. From October 2010 to February 2013 he served as the National Security Advisor to President Lee Myung-bak. He retired after 33 years in the Foreign Ministry to establish the Korean Peninsula Future Forum (KPFF) and is a senior advisor to the Asan Institute for Policy Studies.
