= Office of Strategy and Intelligence =

Subordinate organization of the Ministry of Foreign Affairs of South Korea

- 외교전략정보본부

Office overview
- Headquarters: 60, Sajik-ro 8-gil Jongno-gu, Seoul 110-787, South Korea
- Office executive: Jeong Yeon-du, Vice Minister for Strategy and Intelligence
- Parent department: Ministry of Foreign Affairs of South Korea

The Office of Strategy and Intelligence (Korean: 외교전략정보본부) is a subordinate organization of the Ministry of Foreign Affairs of South Korea.

== Overview ==
At the time of its initial launch, the office's primary roles were handling the North Korean nuclear issue, diplomatic affairs related to the Six-Party Talks, and diplomatic affairs regarding the Korean Peninsula peace regime. In July 2007, duties concerning multilateral security cooperation in Northeast Asia, political cooperation with neighboring countries, and the Armistice Agreement were added; in January 2009, duties regarding North Korean defectors were added.

In May 2024, it was expanded and reorganized into the Office of Strategy and Intelligence, establishing four bureaus under its purview. The primary objective is to implement foreign policy from a more agile and sophisticated perspective in response to changes in the geopolitical environment.

== Organization ==
The Diplomatic Intelligence Bureau was established in 2024 and is an organization responsible for collecting and analyzing intelligence worldwide. The Indo-Pacific Strategy Division under the Strategy and Policy Planning Bureau is a dedicated organization responsible for overseeing and monitoring the implementation of the Indo-Pacific Strategy. The Korean Peninsula Policy Bureau handles the duties of the former Korean Peninsula Peace Negotiation Headquarters.

- Strategy and Policy Planning Bureau (외교전략기획국)
  - Policy Planning Division (외교정책기획과)
  - Indo-Pacific Strategy Division (인태전략과)
- Diplomatic Intelligence Bureau (외교정보기획국)
  - Intelligence Division I (외교정보1과)
  - Intelligence Division II (외교정보2과)
- Korean Peninsula Policy Bureau (한반도정책국)
  - North Korean Nuclear Affairs Policy Division (북핵정책과)
  - Inter-Korean Policy Division (대북정책협력과)
  - Future of Korean Peninsula Policy Division (한반도미래정책과)
- International Security Bureau (국제안보국)
  - International Security and Cyber Affairs Division (국제안보·사이보협력과)
  - Disarmament and Nonproliferation Division (군축비확산과)
  - Export Control and Sanctions Division (수출통제·제재과)

== Head ==
No.	Portrait	Name	Term of office			President
No.	Portrait	Name	Took office	Left office	Time in office	President
1		Jo Gu-rae 조구래	28 May 2024	15 September 2025	1 year, 110 days	Yoon Suk Yeol
2		Jeong Yeon-doo 정연두	28 November 2025	Incumbent	351 days	Lee Jae Myung
