= Joint Declaration of the Denuclearization of the Korean Peninsula =

- 1992 Joint Declaration of the Denuclearization of the Korean Peninsula
- Hangul: 1992 남북 비핵화 공동선언
- Hanja: 1992 南北共同宣言
- Revised Romanization: 1992 Nambuk Gongdong Seoneon
- McCune–Reischauer: 1992 Nambuk Kongdong Sŏnŏn

North Korean name
- Hangul: 1992 북남 비핵화 공동선언
- Hanja: 1992 北南共同宣言
- Revised Romanization: 1992 Bungnam Gongdong Seoneon
- McCune–Reischauer: 1992 Pungnam Kongdong Sŏnŏn

The Joint Declaration of the Denuclearization of the Korean Peninsula was an agreed action item between South Korea and North Korea signed on January 20, 1992. The declaration was issued February 19.

The declaration read in part as follows:

Desiring to eliminate the danger of nuclear war through denuclearization of the Korean peninsula ...

1. The South and the North shall not test, manufacture, produce, receive, possess, store, deploy or use nuclear weapons.
2. The South and the North shall use nuclear energy solely for peaceful purposes.
3. The South and the North shall not possess nuclear reprocessing and uranium enrichment facilities.
4. The South and the North, in order to verify the denuclearization of the Korean peninsula, shall conduct inspection of the objects selected by the other side and agreed upon between the two sides, in accordance with procedures and methods to be determined by the South-North Joint Nuclear Control Commission.
5. The South and the North, in order to implement this joint declaration, shall establish and operate a South-North joint Nuclear Control Commission within one (1) month of the effectuation of this joint declaration.
6. This Joint Declaration shall enter into force as of the day the two sides exchange appropriate instruments following the completion of their respective procedures for bringing it into effect.

Signed on January 20, 1992

Chung Won-shik Prime Minister of the Republic of Korea; Chief delegate of the South delegation to the South-North High-Level Talks

Yon Hyong-muk Premier of the Administration Council of the Democratic People’s Republic of Korea;

Head of the North delegation to the South-North High-Level Talks

At the same time, the Agreement on Reconciliation, Non-aggression and Exchanges and Cooperation between the South and the North (also known as the "South-North Basic Agreement") was made, covering the areas of:

1. South-North Reconciliation
2. South-North Non-Aggression
3. South-North Exchanges And Cooperation

The joint Nuclear Control Commission specified by the agreement was created, and held 13 meetings in 1992 and 1993, but it did not come to any agreements. The last meeting was held in April 1993. So consequent to clause 6, the declaration never entered into force.

== See also ==
- Agreed Framework
- North Korea and weapons of mass destruction
