= Six-party talks =

Meetings on North Korea nuclear program

Chinese name
- Traditional Chinese: 六方會談
- Simplified Chinese: 六方会谈
Transcriptions
Standard Mandarin
- Hanyu Pinyin: Liùfāng Huìtán

Japanese name
- Kanji: 六者会合
- Kana: ろくしゃかいごう
Transcriptions
- Romanization: Rokusha Kaigō

North Korean name
- Chosŏn'gŭl: 륙자 회담
- Hancha: 六者會談
Transcriptions
- Revised Romanization: Ryukja hoedam
- McCune–Reischauer: Ryukcha hoedam

South Korean name
- Hangul: 육자 회담
- Hanja: 六者會談
Transcriptions
- Revised Romanization: Yukja hoedam
- McCune–Reischauer: Yukcha hoedam

Russian name
- Russian: Шестисторо́нние перегово́ры
- Romanization: Shestistorónniye peregovóry

The six-party talks were a series of multilateral discussions between 2003 and 2007, held between six states and hosted in Beijing, aimed at finding a peaceful resolution to the security concerns as a result of the North Korean nuclear weapons program. The states involved were:

- China
- Japan
- North Korea
- South Korea
- Russia
- United States

These talks were a result of North Korea withdrawing from the Nuclear Non-Proliferation Treaty (NPT) in 2003. Apparent gains following the fourth and fifth rounds were reversed by outside events. Five rounds of talks from 2003 to 2007 produced little net progress until the third phase of the fifth round of talks, when North Korea agreed to shut down its nuclear facilities in exchange for fuel aid and steps towards the normalization of relations with the United States and Japan. Responding angrily to the United Nations Security Council's Presidential Statement issued on April 13, 2009, that condemned the North Korean failed satellite launch, the DPRK declared on April 14, 2009, that it would pull out of the six-party talks and that it would resume its nuclear enrichment program in order to boost its nuclear deterrent. North Korea also expelled all nuclear inspectors from the country.

== Content of the six-party talks ==
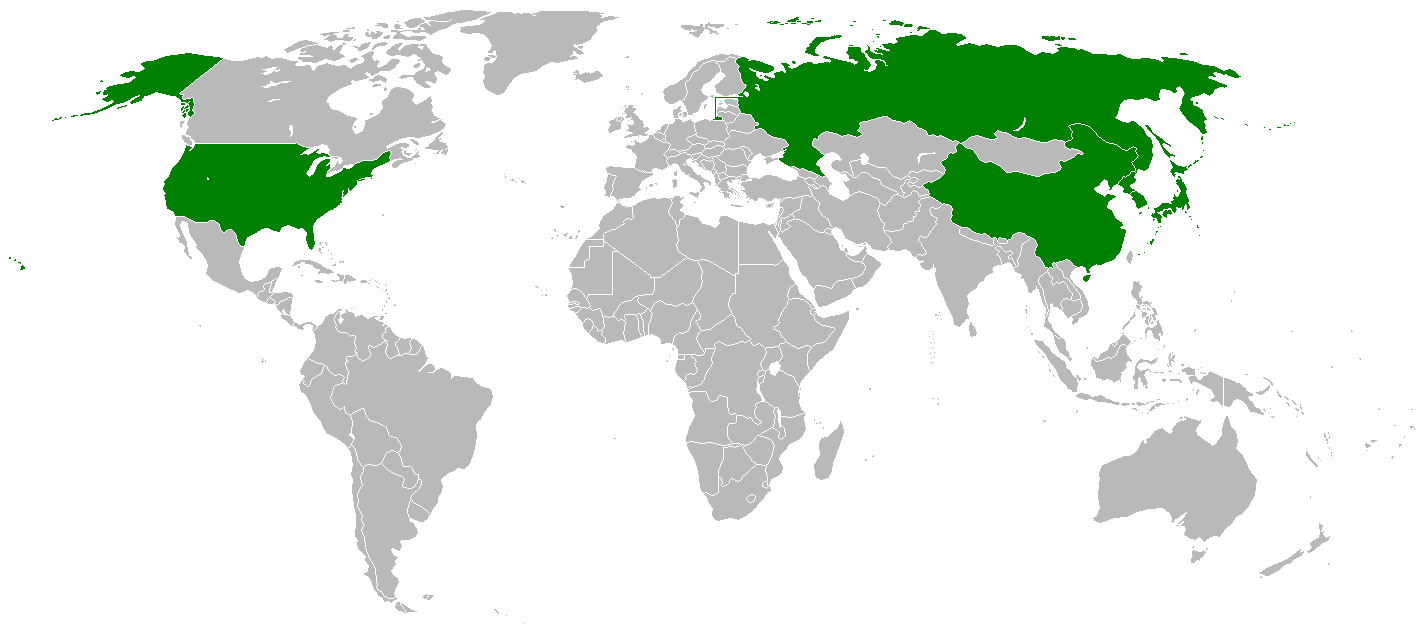
Members of the six-party nuclear talks

The main points of contention were:

- Security guarantee – this issue has been raised by North Korea since the Bush administration (2001–2009) took office. North Korea labeled the Bush administration as hostile and accused it of planning to overthrow the North Korean government by force. This concern was elevated when President George W. Bush named North Korea as part of an "axis of evil" in his 2002 State of the Union Address. After the North Korean refusal to participate in the six-party talks in 2005, South Korea, the United States, and Japan declared that all issues of concern including security guarantees would be on the table if North Korea engaged in discussions within the six-party talks.
- The construction of light water reactors – under the 1994 Agreed Framework two light-water reactors would be built in return for the closure of North Korea's graphite-moderated nuclear power plant program at Yongbyon. This agreement broke down after both sides defaulted, especially since 2002.
- Peaceful use of nuclear energy – whilst the NPT allows states the right to use nuclear energy for civilian purposes, this was thought to have been used by North Korea as a cover for their nuclear weapons program. South Korea was amenable to a peaceful use of nuclear energy provided the IAEA will be allowed to inspect the North's facilities.
- Diplomatic relations – North Korea wanted normalization of diplomatic relations as part of the bargain for giving up its nuclear weapons program. The United States has at times disagreed and at times agreed to this condition, providing North Korea irreversibly and verifiably disarms its nuclear weapons program.
- Financial restrictions / Trade normalization – The United States placed heavy financial sanctions on North Korea for what they see as an uncooperative attitude and unwillingness to dismantle its nuclear weapons program. In addition, other parties such as China took actions such as the freezing of North Korean assets in foreign bank accounts, such as the US$24 million in Macau's Banco Delta Asia. With the nuclear test on October 9, 2006, UNSCR 1718 was passed, which included a ban on all luxury goods to North Korea. These funds were unfrozen by the United States on March 19, 2007, to reciprocate actions by their North Korean counterparts. The United States removed North Korea from its list of state sponsors of terrorism in October 2008.
- Verifiable and Irreversible disarmament – Members of the six-party talks disagreed on this. Japan and the United States demanded that North Korea completely dismantle its nuclear program so that it may never be restarted, and that it can be verified by the six members of the talks before aid is given. By the second round of the six-party talks, South Korea fully endorsed this position. China and Russia agreed on a milder, step-by-step solution which involves the members of the six-party talks giving a certain reward (e.g. aid) in return for each step of nuclear disarmament. North Korea wanted the United States to concede some of the conditions first before it will take any action in disarming their weapons program, which they see as the only guarantee to prevent a United States attack on their soil.

== 1st round (27–29 August 2003) ==
A figure of a table of the six party talks

- Representatives:
- South Korea: Lee Soo-hyuck, Deputy Minister of Foreign Affairs and Trade
- North Korea: Kim Yong-il, Deputy Minister of Foreign Affairs
- United States: James Kelly, Assistant Secretary of State for East Asian and Pacific Affairs
- China: Wang Yi, Vice-Minister of Foreign Affairs
- Japan: Mitoji Yabunaka, Director-General of Asian and Oceanian Affairs Bureau
- Russia: Alexander Losyukov, Deputy Minister of Foreign Affairs

Outcomes

- A Chairman's Summary agreed upon for a further round of talks.
- No agreement between parties made.

See "Why the 6-party talks will fail" (in Korean), the Dong-A Ilbo, 27 August 2003, by Pierre Chabal

== 2nd round (25–28 February 2004) ==
Representatives:
South Korea: Lee Soo-hyuck, Deputy Minister of Foreign Affairs and Trade
North Korea: Kim Kye-gwan, Vice-Minister of Foreign Affairs
United States: James Kelly, Assistant Secretary of State for East Asian and Pacific Affairs
China: Wang Yi, Vice-Minister of Foreign Affairs
Japan: Mitoji Yabunaka, Director-General of Asian and Oceanian Affairs Bureau
Russia: Alexander Losyukov, Deputy Minister of Foreign Affairs

Outcomes

- A Chairman's Statement announced with seven articles, including:
  - Denuclearization of the Korean Peninsula
  - Peaceful Coexistence of Participating States, stressing the use of mutually coordinated measures to resolve crises.
- Agreement to hold the third round of talks with full participation during the second quarter of 2004.

== 3rd round (23–26 June 2004) ==
Representatives
South Korea: Lee Soo-hyuck, Deputy Minister of Foreign Affairs and Trade
North Korea: Kim Kye-gwan, Vice-Minister of Foreign Affairs
United States: James Kelly, Assistant Secretary of State for East Asian and Pacific Affairs
China: Wang Yi, Vice-Minister of Foreign Affairs
Japan: Mitoji Yabunaka, Director-General of Asian and Oceanian Affairs Bureau
Russia: Alexander Alexeyev, Deputy Minister of Foreign Affairs

Outcomes

- A Chairman's Statement announced with eight articles, including:
  - Reaffirming the commitment to denuclearising the Korean Peninsula, stressing specification of the scope and time, interval (between steps of) and method of verification
- Agreement to hold fourth round of talks in Beijing before September 2005

== 4th round ==
=== 1st phase (26 July – 7 August 2005) ===
Representatives
South Korea: Song Min-soon, Deputy Minister of Foreign Affairs and Trade
North Korea: Kim Kye-gwan, Vice-Minister of Foreign Affairs
United States: Christopher Hill, Assistant Secretary of State for East Asian and Pacific Affairs
China: Wu Dawei, Vice-Minister of Foreign Affairs
Japan: Sasae Kenichiro, Deputy Director-General of Asian and Oceanian Affairs Bureau
Russia: Alexander Alexeyev, Deputy Minister of Foreign Affairs

Outcomes

- U.S. and North Korea cannot agree on 'peaceful' use of nuclear energy
- Three-week recess of talks due to ASEAN Regional Forum (ARF) meeting

=== 2nd phase (13–19 September 2005) ===
Representatives
South Korea: Song Min-soon, Deputy Minister of Foreign Affairs and Trade
North Korea: Kim Kye-gwan, Vice-Minister of Foreign Affairs
United States: Christopher Hill, Assistant Secretary of State for East Asian and Pacific Affairs
China: Wu Dawei, Vice-Minister of Foreign Affairs
Japan: Sasae Kenichiro, Deputy Director-General of Asian and Oceanian Affairs Bureau
Russia: Alexander Alexeyev, Deputy Minister of Foreign Affairs

Outcomes

- Agreement on a Joint Statement of six articles, including:
  - Verifiable denuclearization of the Korean Peninsula
  - Observe and realize the 1992 Korean Peninsula Denuclearization Declaration
  - North Korea to agree to abandon all nuclear weapons and nuclear programs and return to the NPT as soon as possible
  - However, the states still respect North Korea's stated right to peaceful use of nuclear energy.
  - The issue of the light water reactors will be discussed "at an appropriate time"
  - U.S. and the South Korea to formally declare that they have no nuclear weapons on the Korean Peninsula
  - U.S. affirmed it has no intention to attack or invade North Korea and will provide a security guarantee to this effect
  - U.S. and North Korea will work to normalize ties, respect each other's sovereignty, exist peacefully together.
  - Japan and North Korea will work to normalize relations, in accordance with the Pyongyang Statement by settling historical disputes.
  - The other five Parties undertook to promote economic cooperation through strengthening bilateral/multilateral economic cooperation in energy, trade and investment.
  - South Korea reaffirmed its proposal of 7/12/05 concerning the provision of 2 million kilowatts of electricity if the DPRK abandoned its nuclear arms program.
  - The Korean Peninsula peace treaty to be negotiated separately.
  - 'Words for words'; 'actions for actions' principle to be observed, stressing 'mutually coordinated measures'.
- Agreement to hold fifth round of talks in early November, 2005.

== 5th round ==
=== 1st phase (9–11 November 2005) ===
Representatives
South Korea: Song Min-soon, Deputy Minister of Foreign Affairs and Trade
North Korea: Kim Kye-gwan, Vice-Minister of Foreign Affairs
United States: Christopher Hill, Assistant Secretary of State for East Asian and Pacific Affairs
China: Wu Dawei, Vice-Minister of Foreign Affairs
Japan: Sasae Kenichiro, Deputy Director-General of Asian and Oceanian Affairs Bureau
Russia: Alexander Alexeyev, Deputy Minister of Foreign Affairs

Outcomes

- Joint Statement issued with six points. This is essentially the same as the previous round's statements, except for:
  - Modifying the 'words for words' and 'actions for actions' principle to 'commitment for commitment, action for action' principle.
- No agreement on when the next talks will be held, though March 2006 looked likely at the time.

=== Events between phases 1 and 2 ===
- In April 2006, North Korea offered to resume talks if the U.S. releases recently frozen North Korean financial assets held in a bank in Macau.
  - The U.S. treats the nuclear and financial issues as separate; North Korea does not.
- North Korea then announced on October 3, 2006, that it was going to test its first nuclear weapon regardless of the world situation, blaming 'hostile U.S. policy' as the reason for the need for such a deterrent. However, it pledged a no-first-strike policy and to nuclear disarmament only when there is worldwide elimination of such nuclear weapons
- On October 9, 2006, North Korea announced a successful nuclear test, verified by the U.S. on October 11.
- In response, the United Nations Security Council passed Resolution 1718 unanimously condemning North Korea, as well as passing Chapter VII, Article 41. Sanctions ranged from the economic to the trade of military units, WMD-related parts and technology transfer, and a ban on certain luxury goods. Both the People's Republic of China and the Russian Federation were quick to stress that these were not military-enforceable sanctions. The Resolution also gave the right to other nations to inspect any North Korean vessel's cargo, although the People's Republic of China has held reservations about this move, saying it wanted to avoid any military confrontation with North Korea's navy.
- On 31 October 2006, the Chinese government announced that six-party talks would resume. U.S. negotiator Christopher Hill later stated that the resumption could happen in the next month and that North Korea had not set preconditions for the talks. The deadlock was broken by what BBC News called "frantic behind-the-scenes negotiations" by Beijing. However, Japan's Foreign Minister Taro Aso stated that his country was not willing to return to the six-party talks until North Korea had renounced nuclear weapons.
- On 5 December 2006, the Russian envoy and former chief Russian negotiator for the six-party talks Alexander Alexeyev said that the talks were unlikely to resume before 2007 owing to the slow progress towards the talks and the fact that Christmas was coming up soon.
- On 10 December, it became apparent that talks would resume on 18 December 2006.

=== 2nd phase (18–22 December 2006) ===
Representatives
South Korea: Chun Yung-woo, Deputy Minister of Foreign Affairs and Trade
North Korea: Kim Kye-gwan, Vice-Minister of Foreign Affairs
United States: Christopher Hill, Assistant Secretary of State for East Asian and Pacific Affairs
China: Wu Dawei, Vice-Minister of Foreign Affairs
Japan: Sasae Kenichiro, Deputy Director-General of Asian and Oceanian Affairs Bureau
Russia: Sergey Razov, Russian Ambassador to China

Objectives achieved

- Chairman's Statement issued
  - All six parties reaffirm their commitment to the Joint Statement made on 19 September 2005 in an 'action for action' manner.
  - All six parties reaffirmed their positions, some of whose positions have differed greatly since the last time the parties met.
- Numerous bilateral talks were held, especially the Sunday before the talks (Dec 17, 2006) and on the third and fourth days of negotiations.
- Separate bilateral talks were made concerning the freezing of overseas North Korean financial assets between the U.S. delegation led by the U.S. Treasury Deputy Assistant Secretary for Terrorist Financing and Financial Crimes, Daniel Glaser, and the North Korean delegation led by the President of the DPRK's Foreign Trade Bank, O Kwang Chol. These talks ended without consensus on a stance, but both delegations agreed to meet again in New York in January 2007.
- The 5th round only went into "recess" on Dec 22, 2006, indicating that the round was not over yet. China's chief six-party talks negotiator Wu Dawei stated on January 8, 2007, that working talks concerning the financial sanctions were likely to resume on January 21–22, 2007 in New York, with the main six-party talks likely to resume soon after in Beijing.

=== Events between phases 2 and 3 ===
- Russia's ex-chief negotiator for the six-party talks Alexander Losyukov has taken over from Sergei Razov as the new chief negotiator. Losyukov was previously the Russian ambassador to Tokyo, appointed immediately after the second round of the six-party talks in March 2004.
- On 26 January 2007, Russian chief negotiator Alexander Losyukov told reporters that the third phase was most likely to resume sometime in late January or early February 2007, most likely 5–8 February 2007. Apparently the North Korean delegation wants to resume these talks on 8 February 2007. The dates were chosen to take place before the Lunar New Year, which commences in mid-February in 2007. This has been supported by the PRC and ROK delegations.
- Both Kim Kye-gwan for North Korea and Christopher Hill for the U.S. made positive remarks about the progress of in-between-rounds one-to-one talks held from Tuesday 16 January 2007 to Thursday 18 January 2007 in Berlin, Germany, pointing to "certain agreements" being reached. They met for six hours on Tuesday and one and a half hours on Wednesday. North Korea has viewed these talks as the "bilateral negotiations" it has wanted with the U.S. for a long time, whereas the U.S. refers to it as talks in "preparation for the six-party talks".
- U.S. Deputy Assistant Treasury Secretary Daniel Glaser is due to hold talks with his North Korean counterpart, O Kwang Chol, in Beijing, China, on Tuesday 30 January 2007 regarding partial lifting of financial sanctions, thought to be around US$13 million of the US$24 million frozen in Macau's Banco Delta Asia.
- China has confirmed on Tuesday 30 January 2007 that the third phase of talks will commence on 8 February 2007.
- North Korea was reported to agree to freeze their nuclear program in exchange for 500,000 tons of fuel oil a year, similar to the 1994 Agreed Framework just before the third phase of talks started after a pre-talk one-on-one meeting between Kim and Hill. There were rumors that a U.S.-North Korean memorandum of understanding had been signed before this phase, although this was denied by U.S. Chief Representative Christopher Hill.

=== 3rd phase (8–13 February 2007) ===
Representatives
South Korea: Chun Yung-woo, Deputy Minister of Foreign Affairs and Trade
North Korea: Kim Kye-gwan, Vice-Minister of Foreign Affairs
United States: Christopher Hill, Assistant Secretary of State for East Asian and Pacific Affairs
China: Wu Dawei, Vice-Minister of Foreign Affairs
Japan: Sasae Kenichiro, Deputy Director-General of Asian and Oceanian Affairs Bureau
Russia: Alexander Losyukov, Deputy Minister of Foreign Affairs

Objectives achieved

- Joint Statement issued on Tuesday 13 February 2007, 3pm
  - North Korea will shut down and seal the Yongbyon nuclear facility, including the reprocessing facility and invite back IAEA personnel to conduct all necessary monitoring and verifications
  - In return, the other five parties in the six-party talks will provide emergency energy assistance to North Korea in the initial phase of 50,000 tons of heavy fuel oil, to commence within 60 days.
  - All six parties agree to take positive steps to increase mutual trust, and make joint efforts for lasting peace and stability in Northeast Asia. Directly related parties will negotiate a permanent peace regime on the Korean Peninsula at an appropriate separate forum.
  - All six parties agree on establishing five working groups – on the denuclearization of the Korean Peninsula, normalization of North Korea-U.S. relations, normalization of North Korea-Japan relations, economy and energy cooperation, as well as a joint Northeast Asia peace and security mechanism.
  - The working groups will form specific plans for implementing the September 19 statement in their respective areas.
  - All parties agree that all working groups will meet within the next 30 days
- Details of assistance will be determined through consultations and appropriate assessments in the working group on economic and energy cooperation.
- Once the initial actions are implemented, the six parties will promptly hold a ministerial meeting to confirm implementation of the joint document and explore ways and means for promoting security cooperation in Northeast Asia.
  - The sixth round of six-party talks will take place on March 19, 2007. This will be to hear reports of the working groups and discuss actions for the next phase.

Events during the 5th round, 3rd phase of talks

- China drew up a plan that was presented on Friday, 9 February 2007, building on the September 2005 agreement. It proposes that the Yongbyon 5MW(e) nuclear reactor be "suspended, shut down and sealed" within two months in exchange for energy supplies and economic aid by the other five countries to North Korea. It also proposed to establish "four to six" working groups on each of the outstanding issues not agreed on. Japan's Foreign Minister Taro Aso was reported to applaud the draft, hailing it as a breakthrough. However, Japanese chief representative Sasae Kenichiro and U.S. chief representative Christopher Hill were much more cautious, saying it was just a first step in a long process, but at least there was agreement by all parties on the fundamental points. North Korean chief representative Kim Kye-gwan said North Korea was "prepared to discuss initial denuclearization steps" but was "neither optimistic nor pessimistic because there are still a lot of problems to be resolved"
- China held one-on-one talks with each of the other five countries on Sunday 11 February 2007. The six countries' chief negotiators then had an hour-long meeting together in the afternoon. They did not announce any end date for this phase of talks after the meeting.
- China's plan has run into some difficulties regarding the steps North Korea will take to denuclearize in exchange for aid. The Japanese chief representative claimed North Korea was demanding too much compensation in return for denuclearization. South Korea's chief representative Chun Yung-woo said it was "unreasonable" to expect a breakthrough on Sunday 11 February 2007. Russia's chief representative Losyukov said that the chances of reaching a two-page joint statement are slim, and if this does not work out, a Chairman's Statement will be issued.
- On February 13, 2007, Christopher Hill announced that a tentative deal had been reached between the negotiators, and a "final text" was being circulated to the governments of the six parties for approval. Even before the deal had been approved, it was criticized by John Bolton, former U.S. ambassador to the United Nations, who said that it sent "exactly the wrong signal to would-be proliferators around the world".
- The Chairman's Statement adopted on February 13, 2007, was the result of 16 hours of grueling negotiations, finalized only at 2 a.m. on February 13, 2007. This was circulated to all six parties, and agreed on at around 3 p.m. that same day.

== 6th round ==
=== 1st phase (19–22 March 2007) ===
Representatives
South Korea: Chun Yung-woo, Deputy Minister of Foreign Affairs and Trade
North Korea: Kim Kye-gwan, Vice-Minister of Foreign Affairs
United States: Christopher Hill, Assistant Secretary of State for East Asian and Pacific Affairs
China: Wu Dawei, Vice-Minister of Foreign Affairs
Japan: Sasae Kenichiro, Director-General for Asian and Oceanian Affairs Bureau
Russia: Alexander Losyukov, Deputy Minister of Foreign Affairs

Objectives achieved

- On March 19, 2007, the US Chief Negotiator Christopher Hill announced that all of the $25 million in funds belonging to the North Koreans in Banco Delta Asia that were frozen before were being unfrozen to reciprocate the positive steps the North Koreans have taken towards freezing their Yongbyon nuclear reactor and readmitting IAEA inspectors, with a future goal towards total nuclear disarmament of the Korean peninsula. However, this issue was only put on the agenda on the morning of the talks instead of before hand, so the financial transaction ran into some problems in terms of time and being cleared (by the Bank of China) for the North Koreans. The North Koreans, led by Kim Kye-gwan, refused to negotiate further until they received their money. The Americans (Christopher Hill, not Daniel Glaser) denied responsibility for the delay, citing it as a "Chinese matter". The Chinese (Wu Dawei) in turn said "there wasn't enough time to accomplish the transaction". The Bank of China has been hesitant to accept the money as Banco Delta Asia has not been removed from the US' blacklist despite having the funds in question unfrozen. Nevertheless, none of the five other parties see this financial issue as posing any obstruction to the talks. "The resolution of the BDA issue is a question of time, not a question of political will", Chun Yung-woo, the South Korean Chief Negotiator, said. The talks have been put on recess at the end of the fourth day of talks after progress was not possible after the second day.
- The US has also admitted that this freezing of funds was a bargaining chip used to pressure North Korea to dismantle.
- The talks were abandoned as North Korea refused to proceed without receiving the $25 million in their hands.
- A South Korean newspaper reported that North Korea had taken steps to shut their Yongbyon 5MW(e) reactor though.

Events taking place between halt and resumption of 1st phase of the 6th round of talks

- The 60-day deadline was obviously not met because of the above, though none of the six parties made much of a hassle about it. The US has urged North Korea to meet its commitments as soon as possible, citing this matter was no longer a US one. Russia, China and South Korea have urged patience. Japan is still pressing for the abduction issue to be resolved. It keeps conditioning its provision of economic incentives to North Korea on the full resolution of the abduction issue.
- On June 11, 2007, Russia agreed to transfer the unfrozen North Korean funds from the Macao bank and transfer them to North Korea.
- On July 14, 2007, after receiving fuel aid from South Korea, North Korea declares it has closed the nuclear facilities at Yongbyon and says it is willing to dismantle all of its nuclear program. On July 18, 2007, IAEA inspectors verify that North Korea has closed its facilities.

=== Resumption of 1st phase (18–20 July 2007) ===
Representatives
South Korea: Chun Yung-woo, Deputy Minister of Foreign Affairs and Trade
North Korea: Kim Kye-gwan, Vice-Minister of Foreign Affairs
United States: Christopher Hill, Assistant Secretary of State for East Asian and Pacific Affairs
China: Wu Dawei, Vice-Minister of Foreign Affairs
Japan: Sasae Kenichiro, Deputy Director-General of Asian and Oceanian Affairs Bureau
Russia: Vladimir Rakhmanin, Deputy Minister of Foreign Affairs

Objectives achieved

- Joint Statement issued on Friday July 20, 2007
  - The six parties expressed satisfaction with the constructive efforts made by all parties to advance the six-party talks process and welcomed that productive bilateral consultations and coordination were conducted to enhance their mutual trust and improved relations with each other.
  - The parties restated their commitment to the Joint Statement of 19 September 2005 and the agreement of 13 February 2007 and undertook to fulfill their respective obligations under those agreements in line with the principle of "action for action".
  - North Korea confirmed its agreement to disclose all nuclear programs and disable all facilities related to its nuclear programs.
  - Agreement for the five working groups to meet before August to discuss plans for the implementation of the general consensus.
  - Talks will resume in September to hear the report of the working groups and work out a roadmap for implementing the general consensus. After the end of the next phase of talks the six parties will hold a ministerial meeting in Beijing as soon as possible to confirm and promote the implementation of the September 19 Joint Statement, the February 13 agreement and the general consensus, and explore ways and means to enhance security cooperation in Northeast Asia.
- A deadline was not decided on during the talks until the working groups have a chance to meet. This is likely because the deadlines set in talks earlier in the year were not met.
- North Korea warned of a "crisis" over Japan's refusal to fund energy assistance. Japan says it will not share the costs of the assistance until North Korea resolves the abductee issue.

Events taking place between 1st and 2nd phase of the 6th round of talks

- South Korean President Roh Moo-hyun proposed forming a Korean Economic Community to be discussed in new inter-Korean talks.
- US President George Bush says he will work on a peace agreement on the Korean Peninsula when North Korea completely disarms.
- Israel reveals an IAF strike in Syria on September 6 was targeting a Syrian nuclear facility built with assistance from North Korea.
- Japanese Prime Minister Shinzo Abe is replaced with Yasuo Fukuda. Fukuda has pledge to lead improve ties with North Korea.

=== 2nd phase (27–30 September 2007) ===
Representatives

South Korea: Chun Yung-woo, Deputy Minister of Foreign Affairs and Trade
North Korea: Kim Kye-gwan, Vice-Minister of Foreign Affairs
United States: Christopher Hill, Assistant Secretary of State for East Asian and Pacific Affairs
China: Wu Dawei, Vice-Minister of Foreign Affairs
Japan: Sasae Kenichiro, Deputy Director-General of Asian and Oceanian Affairs Bureau
Russia: Alexander Losyukov, Deputy Minister of Foreign Affairs

Objectives achieved

- Reports from working groups heard and endorsed.
- Implementation of initial actions of February 13, 2007 Agreement confirmed
- List of Second Phase Actions for Implementation of Joint Statement issued 2 October 2007.
  - DPRK agreed to disable all nuclear facilities subject to September 2005 Joint Statement and February 13 Agreement, including the disablement of three facilities at Yongbyan by 31 December 2007: the 5 MW Experimental Reactor, the Reprocessing Plant, and the Nuclear Fuel Rod Fabrication Facility.
  - The DPRK agreed to provide a complete and correct declaration of all its nuclear programs in accordance with the February 13 agreement by 31 December 2007.
  - The DPRK and the United States will increase bilateral exchanges and enhance mutual trust. The U.S. will fulfill its commitments to the DPRK (regarding the processes of removing the designation of the DPRK as a state sponsor of terrorism, and that of terminating the application of the Trading with the Enemy Act to the DPRK) in parallel with the DPRK's actions, as based on consensus reached at the meetings of the Working Group on Normalization of DPRK-U.S. Relations.
  - The DPRK and Japan will hold intensive consultations to make sincere efforts to normalize their relations expeditiously in accordance with the Pyongyang Declaration.
  - In accordance with the February 13 agreement, economic, energy and humanitarian assistance up to the equivalent of one million tons of HFO (inclusive of the 100,000 tons of HFO already delivered) will be provided to the DPRK. Specific modalities will be finalized through discussion by the Working Group on Economy and Energy Cooperation.
  - The Parties reiterated that the Six-Party Ministerial Meeting will be held in Beijing at an appropriate time.
- A final meeting was decided on before the end of 2007. However, this was never realized because despite the DPRK issuing a report of its inventory in November 2007 and thus claiming that since it fulfilled its side of the bargain, it was waiting for its promised shipment of aid, the US claimed the inventory list was definitely incomplete and until the complete list was given by the DPRK, aid would be suspended. There have been numerous US-DPRK bilateral meetings held in Beijing and Geneva since the end of this phase of this round of talks.

== Discontinuation of talks in 2009 ==
On April 5, 2009, North Korea proceeded with its announced satellite launch, despite international pressure not to do so. The pressure was due to international belief that the satellite launch was in fact a test of ICBM technology. The launch was a failure, and it landed in the Pacific Ocean. Despite the failure, U.S. President Barack Obama responded that "violations must be punished." South Korea urged heavier sanctions against North Korea. On April 13, the United Nations Security Council agreed unanimously to a Presidential Statement that condemned North Korea for the launch and stated the council's intention to expand sanctions on North Korea. The following day, North Korea, responding angrily to the UN Security Council's resolution, said that it "will never again take part in such [six party] talks and will not be bound by any agreement reached at the talks." North Korea expelled nuclear inspectors from the country and also informed the International Atomic Energy Agency that they would resume their nuclear weapons program.

On May 25, 2009, North Korea detonated a nuclear device underground. The test was condemned by the United Nations, NATO, the other five members of the six-party talks, and many other countries worldwide. On October 11, 2011, South Korea appointed a new envoy to the six-party talks; Lim Sung-Nam, who worked for the Ministry of Tourism and Sport beforehand.

On November 10, 2009, the Daecheong incident took place. On this date North and South Korean ships exchanged fire. The Southern vessel was almost unharmed while the North reportedly sustained heavy casualties.

== North Korean attacks in 2010 ==
Cheonan, a South Korean patrol vessel with 104 people aboard, sank after an unexplained explosion tore through its hull while conducting a normal mission in the vicinity of Baengnyeong Island at 9:22 p.m. on March 26, 2010. An investigation conducted by an international team of experts from South Korea, the United States, the United Kingdom, Canada, Australia and Sweden concluded that Cheonan was sunk by a torpedo launched by a North Korean Yeono class miniature submarine. This incident caused rising tension and antagonism between North and South Korea.

On October 26, 2010, Red Cross officials of North Korea and South Korea held meetings to discuss ways of further family reunions, but failed to reach agreement. So did UNC and North Korea, failing to arrange higher-level meeting.

On November 23, 2010, North Korea shelled South Korea's Yeonpyeong Island. Two South Korean soldiers were killed and a dozen injured after North Korea fired dozens of artillery shells onto a South Korean island setting more than 60 houses ablaze and sending civilians fleeing. These two incidents stood in the way of holding six-party talks during this period.

== Proposed resumptions ==
On 29 February 2012, the United States and North Korea announced a "leap day" agreement that the United States would provide substantial food aid in return for the North agreeing to a moratorium on uranium enrichment and missile testing and a return of IAEA inspectors to Yongbyon, leading to a resumption of the six-party talks. On 16 March 2012, North Korea announced it was planning to launch a satellite to commemorate the late founder Kim il-Sung's 100th birthday, drawing condemnation by the other five participants in the six-party talks, casting doubt on the "leap day" agreement. On 6 April 2012, North Korea's satellite failed to enter into orbit, and was declared a failure by the United States and South Korea. In addition, the launch was described as a provocative test of missile technology, and the United States subsequently announced the suspension of food aid to North Korea.

On 29 January 2014, the official Chinese Xinhua News Agency announced on Twitter that the DPRK ambassador to China had received DPRK agreement on resumption of the six-party talks and called on the United States to fulfill its related obligations.

On April 5, 2018, China's paramount leader Xi Jinping announced that after a meeting with North Korea's supreme leader Kim Jong-un that Kim is willing to resume talks. Further updates are pending.

On April 25, 2019, after his first meeting with Kim Jong-un, Russian President Vladimir Putin said that he believed any U.S. guarantees might need to be supported by the other nations involved in previous six-way talks on the nuclear issue. Putin promised to brief the Chinese and U.S. leadership about his talks.

== See also ==
- 2006 North Korean nuclear test
- Agreed Framework (United States–North Korea)
- History of Japan–Korea relations
- North Korea–United States relations
- Yongbyon Nuclear Scientific Research Center
- 2018–19 Korean peace process
- P5+1
