= Kim Hong-kyun =

South Korean diplomat

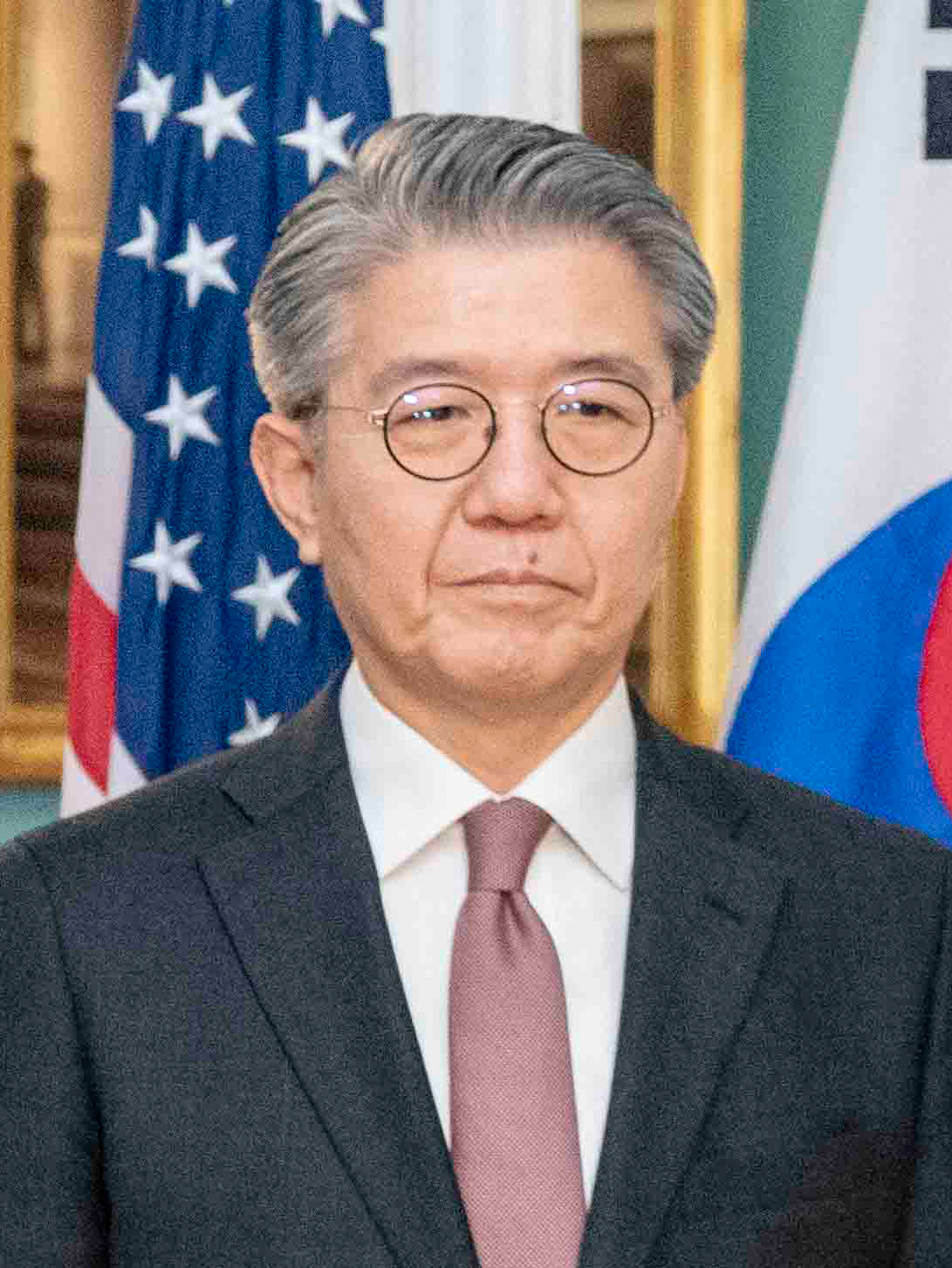
Kim Hong-kyun in 2024

Kim Hong-kyun (Korean: 김홍균) is the first deputy minister for the Ministry of Foreign Affairs of the Republic of Korea.

== Life ==
=== Early life ===
Born in 1961 in Busan, he graduated from Yongsan High School and Seoul National University with a degree in English Language and Literature.

=== Diplomat of Republic of Korea ===
In 1984, he passed the 18th foreign service exam and graduated from Seoul National University and joined the diplomatic service.

He later worked at the Department of Foreign Affairs (formerly Department of Foreign Affairs and Trade, Department of Foreign Affairs), where he held the positions of Director of the North American Division 2, Head of Security Cooperation between the Republic of Korea and the United States, Counsellor of the Embassy of Belgium and Director of the Peace Diplomacy Planning Group, and was promoted to the rank of Vice President Minister at the end of the administration and held the position of Director of the Division of Peace Negotiations in the Korean Peninsula under the presidency of Park Geun-hye.

On April 10, 2017, Wu Dawei, the Chinese envoy for international efforts to end North Korea's nuclear weapons program met with Kim Hong-Kyun in Seoul, to discuss the issue in detail.

In August 2021, he joined the Yoon Suk-yeol Camp Advisory Group for Foreign Affairs, Unification and Security, and in October 2022, after Yoon’s election, he was appointed Ambassador to Germany.

In December 2023, the First Deputy Minister of Foreign Affairs, Jang Ho-jin, was appointed successor to the First Deputy Minister of Foreign Affairs when he became Director of the Office of National Security.

== Career ==
- Special Representative for Korean Peninsula Peace and Security Affairs
- Ambassador of Republic of Korea to Germany.
- First Deputy Minister of Foreign Affairs
