= Kim Yong-il (politician, born 1947) =

North Korean politician (1947–2023)

- Hangul: 김영일
- Hanja: 金永一
- RR: Gim Yeongil
- MR: Kim Yŏngil

Kim Yong-il (Korean: 김영일, 17 March 1947 – September / October 2023) was a North Korean high-ranking diplomat and politician. As of 2008, he was the Deputy Foreign Minister of North Korea.

== Life and career ==
Yong-il graduated from Pyongyang University of Foreign Studies. In 1975, he joined the Ministry of Foreign Affairs of the North Korean. He belonged to the International Affairs Department.

In 1985, he was appointed Counsellor at the Embassy in Algeria.

In March 1990, he was appointed Director General of the Ministry of Foreign Affairs.

In July 1990, he served as an adviser to the Foreign Affairs Committee of the Supreme People's Assembly.

In January 1993, he was appointed Deputy Minister for Foreign Affairs.

In January 1996, he was appointed Ambassador of the DPRK to Libya and concurrently served as Ambassador to Malta, Tunisia and Algeria.

In January 2000, he was appointed Vice Minister of Foreign Affairs.

At Japan–North Korea Pyongyang Declaration held in 2002, also at the Japan-North Korea summit on 2004, he greeted Japanese Prime Minister Junichiro Koizumi at the airport in Pyongyang as courtesies.

In August 2003, he joined Six-party talks as a Vice Foreign Minister of North Korea.

After that, he was in charge of diplomatic negotiations with China and Japan, including the talk with Isao Iijima of Japan, on 2013–2014, former top aide of Koizumi and then a member of Shinzo Abe cabinet.

At the 2016 Congress of the Workers' Party of Korea held in 5 May, it was confirmed that he would resign from the Politburo candidate of the Party Central Committee.

On 3 October 2023, it was announced that Yong-il had died at the age of 76. Kim Jong Un presented a wreath at his grave.
