= Kim Jina =

South Korean political scientist (born 1979)

- 김진아
- Kim in 2026

Second Vice Minister of Foreign Affairs
- Incumbent
- Assumed office 10 June 2025
- President: Lee Jae Myung
- Prime Minister: Kim Min-seok
- Preceded by: Kang In-seon

Personal details
- Born: 27 January 1979 (age 47) Busan, South Korea
- Education: Pusan National University; Yonsei University; Tufts University

Kim Jina (Korean: 김진아; Hanja: 金珍我; born January 27, 1979) is a South Korean political scientist. She currently serves as the Second Vice Minister of Foreign Affairs under the Lee Jae-myung government.

== Career ==
Born in Busan in 1979, Kim Jina earned a bachelor's degree in English Language and Literature and Political Science and Diplomacy from Pusan National University. Subsequently, she earned a master's degree in International Studies from the Graduate School of International Studies at Yonsei University and received a Ph.D. in International Relations from the Tufts University.

She worked as a research fellow at the Korea Institute for Defense Analyses from 2012 and served as the head of the North Korean Military Research Division from January 2020 to August 2021.

During the 2025 presidential election, she served as the Standing Co-Chair of the Committee on Pragmatic Diplomacy Centered on National Interests under the Democratic Party Committee on a Globally Responsible Power, contributing to presidential candidate Lee Jae Myung’s foreign policy vision. After Lee's election, she was appointed as the 2nd Vice Minister of Foreign Affairs in June 2025.
