= Ministry of Foreign Affairs (South Korea) =

Government ministry of South Korea

- 외교부

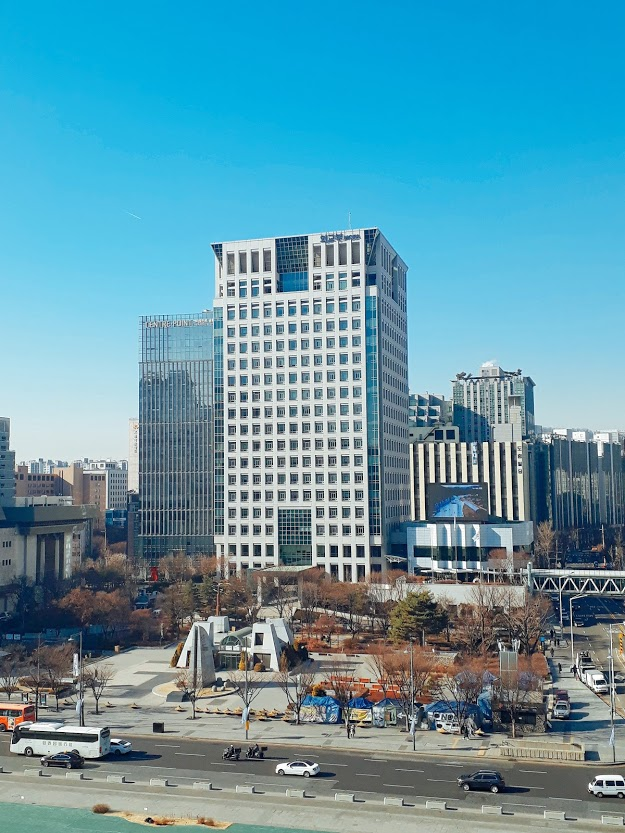
- MOFA headquarters in Seoul

Agency overview
- Formed: 17 July 1948
- Preceding agencies: Ministry of Foreign Affairs (1948-1998); Ministry of Foreign Affairs and Trade (1998-2013)
- Jurisdiction: Government of South Korea
- Headquarters: 60, Sajik-ro 8-gil Jongno-gu, Seoul 110-787, South Korea 37.573568°N 126.975080°E
- Annual budget: ₩4.29 trillion (US$3.13 billion) (FY2024)
- Minister responsible: Cho Hyun
- Deputy Ministers responsible: Park Yoon-Joo, 1st Vice Minister - Bilateral Diplomacy; Kim Jina, 2nd Vice Minister - Multilateral Diplomacy
- Parent department: State Council of South Korea
- Child agencies: Overseas Koreans Agency; Office of Strategic Intelligence and Diplomacy
- Website: Ministry of Foreign Affairs; Ministry of Foreign Affairs (English)

Korean name
- Hangul: 외교부
- Hanja: 外交部
- RR: Oegyobu
- MR: Oegyobu

The Ministry of Foreign Affairs (MOFA; Korean: 외교부) is a government agency of South Korea. It is in charge of the country's foreign relations, as well as handling matters related to overseas Korean nationals. It was established on 17 July 1948.

Its main office is located in the MOFA Building in Jongno District, Seoul. The ministry previously had its headquarters in a facility in Doryeom-dong in Jongno District.

== History ==
=== Ministry of Foreign Affairs (1948-1998) ===
The Ministry of Foreign Affairs (Korean: 외무부) was created in 1948 following the Government Organisation Law under the Syngman Rhee administration. It undertook matters of foreign policy, protection of overseas Korean nationals, international economy, treaties, diplomacy and the assessment of international and overseas public relations. The top priority for the Ministry was initially to focus on the "international recognition of the new Korean government as the only legitimate one on the Korean peninsula". Shortly after the Ministry was established, overseas missions in the United States, the United Kingdom and France were set up.

In 1963 the Educational Institute of Foreign Service Officers was established to further educate foreign public officials and improve their work efficiency. In 1965 the Educational institute became the Research Institute of Foreign Affairs. In December, 1976 the Research Institute was reorganised again to become the Institute for Foreign Affairs and Security. In 2012, this institution developed into the Korea National Diplomatic Academy and has the largest research and training institution of its kind within South Korea.

=== Ministry of Foreign Affairs and Trade (1998-2013) ===
In 1998, under Kim Dae-jung administration the ministry's name was changed to Ministry of Foreign Affairs and Trade (MOFAT, Korean: 외교통상부), and it was given jurisdiction over external trade.

=== Ministry of Foreign Affairs (2013-present) ===
In 2013, it reverted to its earlier name of the Ministry of Foreign Affairs following Park Geun-hye’s reorganisation plan, and the responsibility for trade matters was handed over to the Ministry of Knowledge Economy, which was renamed the Ministry of Trade, Industry and Energy (MOTIE). Due to this change, Office of the Minister for Trade was also relocated to the Ministry of Trade, Industry and Energy.

== Logo ==
1949~2005

2005-2013

2013-2016

2016~Current

== Organisation ==
The minister is supported by two vice-ministers, vice-ministerial-level chancellor of Korea National Diplomatic Academy, and Vice Minister for Strategy and Intelligence.

=== Vice Minister of Foreign Affairs 1 ===
- Asian and Pacific Affairs Bureau
- Northeast and Central Asia Affairs Bureau
- ASEAN and Southeast Asia Affairs Bureau
- North American Affairs Bureau
- Latin American and Caribbean Affairs Bureau
- European Affairs Bureau
- African and Middle Eastern Affairs Bureau

=== Vice Minister of Foreign Affairs 2 ===
- Consular Affairs and Safety
- International Affairs and Nuclear Affairs
- Development Cooperation
- International Legal Affairs
- Public Diplomacy and Cultural Affairs
- International Economic Affairs
- Bilateral Economic Affairs
- Climate Change, Energy, Environment and Scientific Affairs

=== Child Agency ===
- Overseas Koreans Agency
- Office of Strategic Intelligence and Diplomacy

=== Affiliated organization ===
- Korea National Diplomatic Academy
  - Institute of Foreign Affairs and National Security

=== Related organization ===
- Korea-Africa Foundation
- Korea International Cooperation Agency
- Korea Foundation

== 2021 P4G Seoul Summit ==
The South Korean MoFA (Ministry of Foreign Affairs) is involved in creating environmental policies and working with countries around the world to achieve sustainable development goals (SDGs). As such they are hosting the P4G Seoul Summit in late May 2021. The event will be done online due to the COVID-19 crisis, and will look into improving the current climate change situation. The summit will look into improving the global public-private cooperation. The foreign minister Chung Eui-yong is particularly involved in this initiative as this has a significant impact on the relationship between the ROK and other countries such as the US and Denmark.

June 2015 saw South Korea publish its Nationally Determined Contribution (NDC), an initiative by which countries focus on improving their environmental goals. The country set the aim of lowering emissions by 37% by 2030. As well as this, South Korea has participated in many initiatives to lower their carbon footprint such as the COP21 in Paris, ratifying the document in December 2015. Korea has taken a ‘green growth’ approach to climate change but despite these efforts there was actually an increase in coal usage over the past decade. Predictions have shown that Korea is not likely to reach the set targets. The MoFA, however, has been in close contact with Denmark to work together on their Green Growth Alliance (2011) in an attempt to make the P4G Seoul Summit a success.

== Overseas Koreans Agency (OKA) ==
 GOVERNMENT ORGANIZATION ACT

Article 30 (Ministry of Foreign Affairs)

(3) In order to administer duties concerning overseas Koreans, the Overseas Koreans Administration shall be established under the Minister of Foreign Affairs. <Newly Inserted on Mar. 4, 2023>

(4) The Overseas Koreans Administration shall have one Administrator and one Vice Administrator; the Administrator shall be a public official in political service and the Vice Administrator shall be appointed from among members in general service of the Senior Executive Service. <Newly Inserted on Mar. 4, 2023>

The Overseas Koreans Agency (OKA) is a central administrative agency of the Government of the Republic of Korea, officially launched on June 5, 2023.

It is a dedicated organization that comprehensively establishes and executes policies and tasks related to the approximately 7.5 million overseas Koreans. It was established as a vice-ministerial level central administrative agency, elevated from the previous system of the Overseas Koreans Foundation (OKF), which was under the Ministry of Foreign Affairs.

Prior to the OKA's establishment, the Overseas Koreans Foundation (OKF), which was under the Ministry of Foreign Affairs, handled affairs concerning overseas Koreans from 1997 to 2023.

However, the OKF's limitations were pointed out several times.

Besides the Foundation, affairs were dispersed among multiple government ministries, including the Ministry of Foreign Affairs, Ministry of Justice, Ministry of Patriots and Veterans Affairs, and Military Manpower Administration, leading to criticism regarding the inconvenience of having to deal with multiple agencies [2].

A critique was raised that the OKF struggled to fully oversee and coordinate policies related to overseas Koreans due to limitations in its legal status and budget allocation [3].

It primarily remained limited to roles such as cultural exchange and simple civil affairs processing. Furthermore, there were constant concerns that it was difficult to comprehensively address complex demands from overseas Korean communities, such as promoting rights and education for the next generation.

Given that the number of overseas Koreans reached 7.32 million as of 2021 [4], the necessity arose for a comprehensive and systematic response to changes in the policy environment, including elevated expectations from the community, generational shifts, and the increased influence of overseas Koreans [5].

The discussion on establishing the OKA had been continuously raised by the overseas Korean community and political circles for several years. During the 20th presidential election, candidate Yoon Suk-Yeol of the People Power Party pledged to establish a dedicated agency for overseas Koreans. Following his inauguration, the establishment was officially announced on October 6, 2022, through a government reorganization plan [6][7].

Following 2022, discussions regarding relevant legal amendments (Government Organization Act and Overseas Koreans Foundation Act) in the National Assembly rapidly progressed. The government decided to establish a separate dedicated agency by transferring overseas Korean policy functions from the Ministry of Foreign Affairs and integrating the business functions of the Overseas Koreans Foundation to enhance one-stop support for overseas Koreans [7]. The relevant legal amendments passed the National Assembly plenary session in May 2023 without major disagreement between the ruling and opposition parties [8][9], and the OKA was finally launched in June 2023.

The primary goal of the OKA is to strengthen support policies for overseas Koreans and provide one-stop civil services covering consular affairs, immigration, nationality, and military service through cooperation with relevant ministries [10][11].

Specifically, the OKA takes on the function of establishing and comprehensively coordinating overseas Korean policies tailored to the characteristics of each country and region, and executing these policies in cooperation with relevant ministries. Key detailed functions include:

- Customized Policy Implementation: The Agency implements support for education and cultural projects for overseas Koreans, support for overseas emigration, and assistance for building economic networks for overseas Korean businesspeople. - Region-Specific Specialized Policies: It promotes customized policies based on the characteristics of each country of residence. For instance, for the US and Canada, it develops support policies for adopted Koreans and dual citizens; for Japan, it focuses on supporting the main Koreans-in-Japan organization, Mindan; and for Russia and the Commonwealth of Independent States (CIS), it concentrates on specialized support programs for Koryo-saram and Sakhalin Koreans [12].

The OKA is a vice-ministerial level central administrative agency under the Minister of Foreign Affairs. It is structured with a Commissioner (Vice-Minister level), Director General for Planning and Coordination, the Overseas Korean Policy Bureau, and other departments. Considering the accessibility for the dense population of overseas Koreans, its main headquarters are located in Incheon [13]. For the convenience of overseas Koreans visiting Korea, an Integrated Civil Service Center (Service and support center for overseas Koreans) and the Overseas Koreans 365 Civil Service Call Center were established and operate in Jongno-gu, Seoul [14].

The OKA secured an initial budget of 106.7 billion KRW (Korean Won) upon its launch in 2024 [15]. This figure represents a 58% increase in budget compared to the former Overseas Koreans Foundation. The proposed budget for the OKA for 2026 is set at 109.2 billion KRW [16].

The establishment of the OKA receives positive evaluation for enhancing the consistency and efficiency of overseas Korean policies and laying the foundation for policies that contribute to the national interest. Concurrently, as a newly established institution, it faces challenges such as establishing cooperation systems with existing ministries and securing sufficient personnel.

The OKA self-evaluates that the enactment of the Overseas Koreans Framework Act (May 9, 2023) and its launch (June 5, 2023) have laid the legal and institutional groundwork for the comprehensive and systematic planning and execution of overseas Korean policies. The Agency assesses that this move holds significance by integrating duties previously dispersed among multiple ministries, thereby establishing an administrative foundation that secures policy consistency and efficiency [17][18].

The establishment of the Integrated Civil Service Support Center and the Overseas Koreans 365 Civil Service Call Center, along with utilizing the 'Consular Civil Affairs 24' website to provide integrated services across multiple ministries and consultation in five languages (Korean, English, Japanese, Chinese, and Russian), is positively evaluated as having established the foundation for convenient one-stop civil services [19]. The establishment of the Overseas Koreans Service Support Center allows overseas Koreans visiting Korea to resolve civil affairs without needing to visit multiple ministries [20].

The policy focus has shifted away from one-time events, toward livelihood and field-oriented policies that provide fundamental benefits to overseas Koreans. The OKA emphasizes projects that aid the overseas expansion of domestic SMEs and the creation of youth jobs [21]. The Agency actively promotes exchange and cooperation between domestic and international business figures through events like the 'World Korean Business Convention'. The OKA reported that the 2025 Convention was attended by about 4,000 people and resulted in contracts totaling 49.9 million USD (approx. 74 billion KRW), supporting the revitalization of the Korean economy [22].

A critique is raised that overlapping or necessary linkages exist with functions of existing ministries (e.g., the Ministry of Foreign Affairs' consular affairs and the Ministry of Justice's immigration and nationality duties). This makes the concrete establishment of an inter-ministerial cooperation system and coordination of duties urgent for effective policy implementation [23].

Furthermore, to secure the OKA's role as the control tower for overseas Korean policies, the formulation of an 'Overseas Koreans Policy Master Plan' to guide all ministerial policies toward a unified direction is cited as a major task [23].

In response, the OKA recognizes the need for a comprehensive and holistic approach to overseas Korean issues and plans to continuously strengthen its inter-ministerial cooperation framework [24].

The diverse political, economic, and cultural interests and demands among overseas Korean communities worldwide require that the OKA pursue balanced policies, making conflict resolution ability crucial.

Addressing changes in the community's composition, such as the rise of the next generation with multiple cultural identities, and implementing region-specific customized policies that consider the characteristics of the country of residence are cited as key tasks [26].

There is criticism that continuous and stable securing of professional personnel is necessary to handle the significantly expanded scope of duties.

Some media outlets have pointed out that the withdrawal of dedicated OKA personnel (consuls) from seven major overseas missions, including LA and New York, after the Agency's launch has created a gap in local support and may have, in fact, caused a retreat in overseas Korean affairs [27]

== See also ==
- MOFAT Diamond scandal
- Indo-Pacific Strategy of South Korea
- Foreign relations of South Korea
- Ministry of Foreign Affairs (North Korea)
