= North Korea–United States relations =

- North Korea: United States

Diplomatic mission
- Permanent Mission of North Korea to the United Nations, New York City: Interests Section in the Swedish Embassy, Pyongyang

Envoy
- Permanent Representative to the UN Kim Song: Special Representative for North Korea (vacant)

Relations between North Korea and the United States have been historically and currently hostile. The two countries have no formal diplomatic relations. Instead, they have adopted an indirect diplomatic arrangement using neutral intermediaries. The Swedish Embassy in Pyongyang is the U.S. protecting power and provides limited consular services to U.S. citizens. North Korea, officially the Democratic People's Republic of Korea (DPRK), does not have an embassy in Washington, D.C., but is represented in the United States through its mission to the United Nations in New York City which serves as North Korea's de facto embassy.

The source of the hostilities dates back to the Korean War in which both countries fought on opposite sides. Since the armistice was signed, areas of contention have since revolved around North Korea's nuclear weapons program and missile tests, North Korea's human rights record, U.S. sanctions against North Korea, and military exercises held by the U.S. and South Korea. Despite no formal diplomatic relations, both sides have maintained contact to deescalate tensions. According to the policy objectives of the U.S. State Department, "Peace and prosperity on the Korean Peninsula is the ultimate goal for the United States in its relationship with the DPRK".

== Defining issues of contention ==
In recent years relations have been largely defined by heavy U.S. military presence in South Korea, joint U.S.–South Korea military exercises in the South China Sea, US economic sanctions against North Korea for their nuclear program and North Korea's demand that the United States eliminate its nuclear arsenal that could reach the Korean peninsula.

North Korea has conducted six tests of nuclear weapons between 2006 and 2017. It has developed long-range missiles capable of striking targets thousands of miles away, possibly as far away as the continental United States, and threatened to strike the United States (as recently as 2013) and South Korea with nuclear weapons and conventional forces.

The United States' nuclear weapons program in nearby Guam consists of B-1B Lancer bombers and B-2 Spirit bombers capable of launching nuclear weapons "60 times more destructive than the bomb dropped on Nagasaki." From Guam, the U.S. conducts precision strike exercises to simulate a preemptive nuclear strike on North Korea.

Since the Korean War, the United States has maintained a strong military presence in South Korea with 28,500 troops, 90 Patriot missiles and five military bases.

The United States has not adopted a No First Use nuclear weapons policy. North Korea's stated policy position is that nuclear weapons "will never be abused or used as a means for preemptive strike", but if there is an "attempt to have recourse to military force against us" North Korea may use their "most powerful offensive strength in advance to punish them".

In March 2025, Kim Jong Un blamed the United States for instigating North Korea militarily and vowed retaliation.

== Polling in the United States on bilateral relations ==
In a 2020 YouGov poll conducted in the run-up to the US presidential election, the Washington-based Korea Economic Institute (KEI) of America, which commissioned the poll, reported only 31% of respondents approved of President Donald Trump's diplomatic overtures to North Korea, though a senior director at KEI conjectured support for diplomatic relations was weakened by Trump's calling Kim Jong Un, North Korea's leader, a "friend" and saying "they fell in love with each other."

Support among the American public for US forces to defend South Korea has increased steadily. While it was at a mere 26% in 1990, it nearly tripled to 62% in 2017, and in 2020, more than six in 10 Americans viewed the U.S. military alliance with South Korea as advantageous, with over half wanting to maintain the US troop level at nearly 30,000 soldiers. In 2017, a majority of the American public also had a positive view of Moon Jae-in, the South Korean president, who in 2018 supported a formal declaration to end the U.S.–North Korean war.

As relations with Korea waxed hot and cold under President Trump, American public opinion regarding North Korea likewise fluctuated sharply, and no clear picture emerges. In a 2020 Gallup Poll, only 12% of the Americans surveyed gave North Korea a positive rating.

A Harris poll published in 2023 found that 68% of United States respondents believed that Joe Biden should offer direct talks with Kim Jong Un. 58% agreed that the United States should offer North Korea with economic or diplomatic incentives in exchange for steps towards denuclearization.

In July 2024, North Korea dismissed Trump's claims of a close relationship with Kim Jong Un as ineffective, emphasizing that their bond didn't lead to substantial changes. Pyongyang reiterated that future DPRK-US relations depend on US actions, urging a shift in policy. Despite Trump's summits with Kim, no lasting diplomatic progress was achieved.

== History ==
=== Early years ===
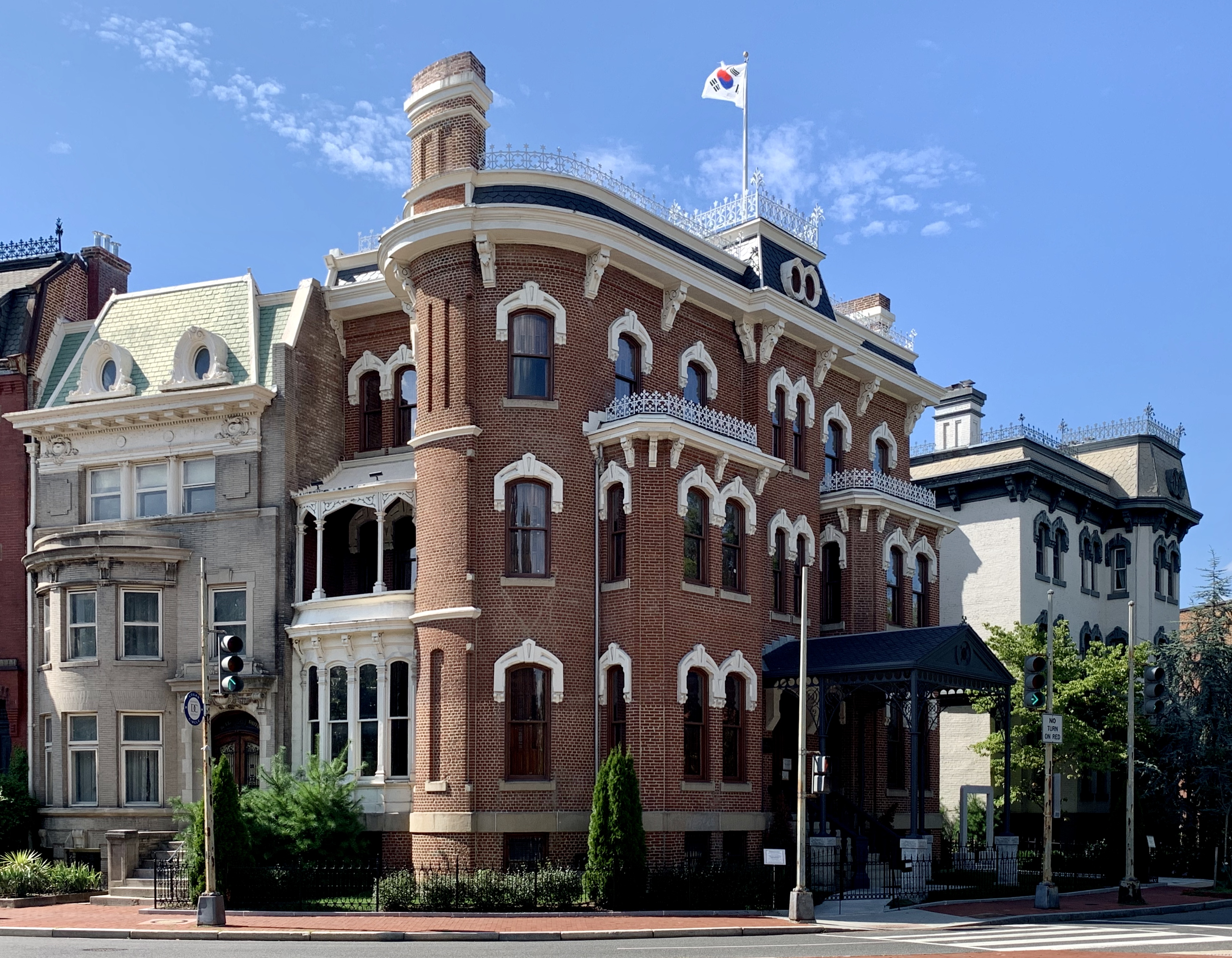
The Old Korean Legation Museum in Washington, D.C. is where the Korean legation was housed from 1889 to 1905.

Following the United States expedition to Korea in 1871, the United States and Joseon established diplomatic relations under the 1882 Treaty of Peace, Amity, Commerce, and Navigation. In 1883, Joseon sent the first ever Korean special mission to the United States, also known in Korean as Bobingsa (보빙사; 報聘使). However, Japan assumed direction over Korean foreign affairs in 1905 and in 1910 began a 35-year period of colonial rule over Korea.

Following World War II, the United Nations divided Korea along the 38th parallel, intending this as a temporary measure. A breakdown in relations between the U.S. and USSR, however, prevented a reunification. As a result, in August 1945, the U.S. and U.S.S.R. divided control over the Korean Peninsula, with the Soviet Army and its proxies supporting a communist government in the North and the U.S. supporting a capitalist government in the South.

Each half was polarized politically: the USSR-backed North was led by the Communist Party, while U.S. general John Hodge handpicked far-right Syngman Rhee to lead the South. Initial talks in 1945–6 to achieve a unified, independent Korea were not successful. The U.S. petitioned the United Nations to find a resolution, and the UN concluded that elections should be held. In reality, only the South held an election, as the North refused to allow UN officials entry to supervise the election. Syngman Rhee was officially elected after ruling the South for several years already, and in turn Stalin's regime appointed Communist Kim Il-Sung without an election.

In 1948, two separate nations were established: the Republic of Korea (ROK) in the South, and the Democratic People's Republic of Korea (DPRK) in the North. On January 1, 1949, the United States officially recognized the Republic of Korea as the sole legitimate government of Korea and established diplomatic relations on March 25 of that year.

=== Cold War ===
==== Pre–Korean War (1948–1950) ====
On September 9, 1948, Workers' Party of Korea leader Kim Il Sung declared the Democratic People's Republic of Korea; he promptly received diplomatic recognition from the Soviet Union, but not the United States. The U.S. did not extend, and has never extended formal diplomatic recognition to the DPRK. Kim Il-Sung's anti-American rhetoric often asserted that the U.S. was a capitalist and imperialist successor to Japan, Korea's colonial occupier from 1910 to 1945. In December 1950, the United States initiated economic sanctions against the DPRK under the Trading with the Enemy Act, which lasted until 2008.

==== Korean War (1950–1953) ====
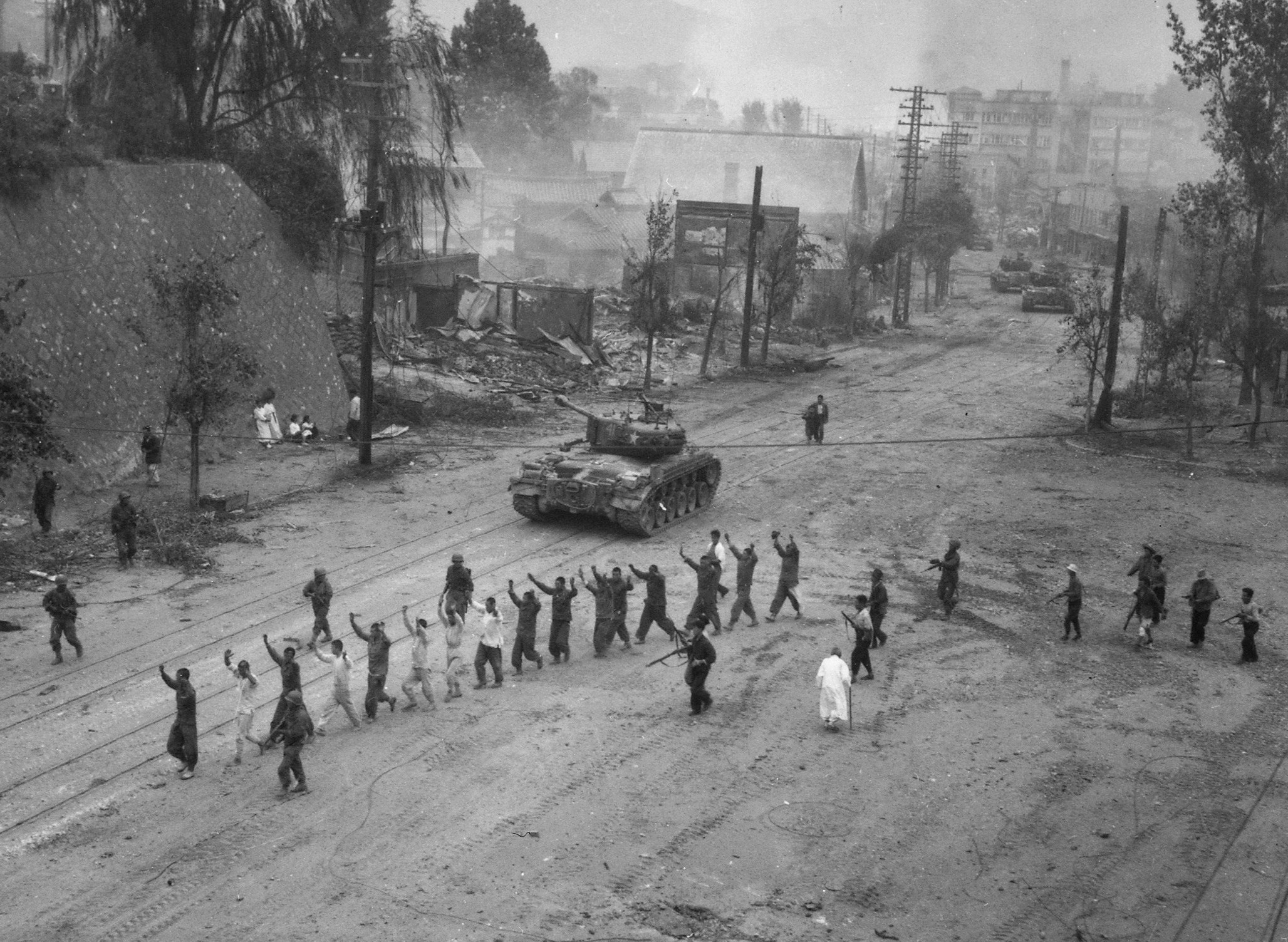
American M26 Pershing tanks in downtown Seoul and North Korean prisoners-of-war during the Korean War, September 1950

===== October–December 1950 =====
On June 25, 1950, 75,000 soldiers from the Korean People's Army crossed the 38th Parallel to invade South Korea, starting the Korea War, the first military action of the Cold War between the United States and the Soviet Union. After two months, North Korea had nearly conquered South Korea, however, US-led United Nations forces were able to push them back and in October 1950, they invaded North Korea and advanced towards the Chinese border prompting a full-scale Chinese intervention which forced UN forces to retreat from North Korea. The final two years of the war turned into a war of attrition along the 38th parallel. An estimated three million soldiers and civilians lost their lives in what has been termed "The Forgotten War" sandwiched between World War II and the Vietnam War. American General Curtis LeMay, who was head of the Strategic Air Command during the war, stated in a 1988 interview to Air Force historians that "Over a period of three years or so we killed off, what, 20 percent of the population of Korea, as direct casualties of war or from starvation and exposure?" During the war, the U.S. carpet bombed North Korea, dropping 635,000 tons of bombs on Korea, including 32,557 tons of napalm — more than the United States used in the Pacific War against Japan during World War II.

==== Consideration of atomic bomb ====
In 1950, when President Harry S. Truman was concerned about the Chinese People's Volunteer Army seizing South Korea, he said dropping an atomic bomb on North Korea was under "active consideration." General Douglas MacArthur, who headed the United Nations Command during the Korean War, wanted to drop “between 30 and 50 atomic bombs ... strung across the neck of Manchuria” that would have “spread behind us ... a belt of radioactive cobalt.” B-29 bombers, capable of carrying atomic bombs, were sent to Guam, though the bombs lacked a plutonium core. Historians theorize the US, which had used atomic weapons at the end of WWII against the Japanese cities of Hiroshima and Nagasaki, chose not to use nuclear weapons during the Korean War for multiple reasons: fear of escalation to a third World War; opposition from U.S. allies; lack of large urban centers to target in North Korea.

==== Public opinion ====
Public support in the United States to commit ground troops to Korea was at first, remarkably high. In June 1950, 78% of Americans said they approved of Truman's decision to send military aid, and 15% disapproved. But by January 1951, public support for the war had plummeted to 38%.

==== Armistice ====
In 1953, the United Nations Command, North Korea, and China signed the Korean War Armistice Agreement for exchanging prisoners of war, marking a north–south boundary within a demilitarized zone, and suspending fighting. A formal peace treaty, however, was never signed.

In 1953, the U.S. signed a mutual security treaty, promising to defend South Korea from North Korean aggression by stationing U.S. troops along the Korean Demilitarized Zone (DMZ) and including South Korea under the U.S. nuclear umbrella. The U.S. pledged to use nuclear weapons to deter and, if necessary, prevail in an attack on the South. In 1991, the U.S. removed its tactical nuclear weapons from the Korean peninsula after North Korea conditioned international inspections on their removal.

==== Post–Korean War (1953–1991) ====
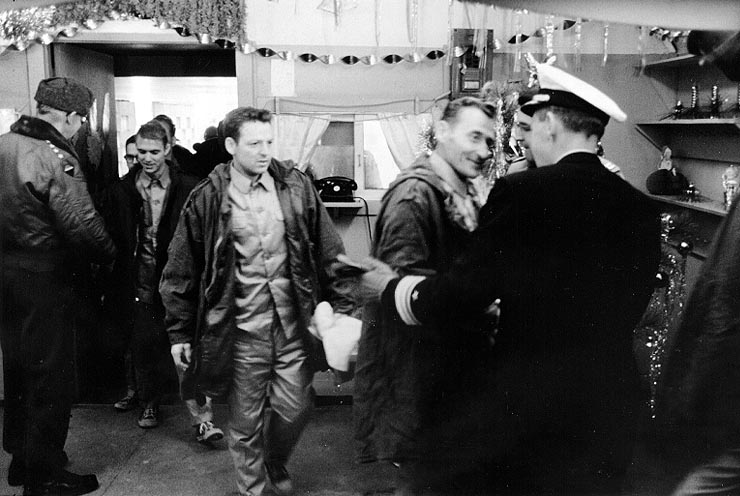
Release of USS Pueblo crew on December 23, 1968

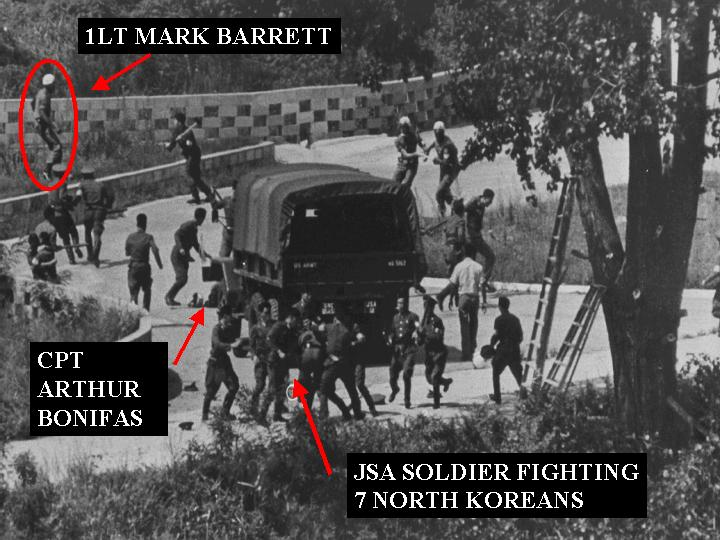
Axe murder incident on August 18, 1976

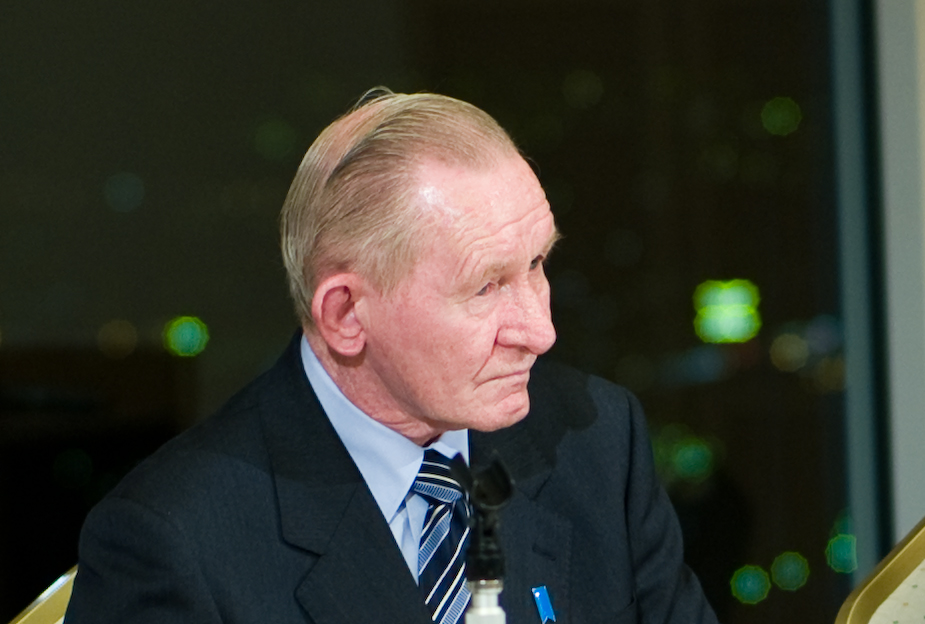
Sergeant Charles Jenkins in 2007

In the early 1960s, several American soldiers defected to North Korea. Only one defector, Charles Jenkins, returned to the U.S. and faced a U.S. military court, pleading guilty to charges of desertion and aiding the enemy. Jerry Parrish, Larry Abshier and James Dresnok died of natural causes in North Korea.

Some leafleting of North Korea was resumed after the heavy leafleting that took place in the Korean War, such Operation Jilli from 1964 to 1968. One leaflet was on one side a successful reproduction of a North Korean one won note, about six weeks' pay for an ordinary North Korean soldier, and on the other a safe conduct pass for defection to the south. The rationale was to allow soldiers to easily hide the pass, but the quality was sufficient for it to gain some use as a fraudulent banknote in North Korea.

===== Pueblo incident =====
On January 23, 1968, Korean People's Navy patrol boats intercepted the United States Navy spy ship USS Pueblo in disputed waters, capturing and transferring the crew of 83 men to Pyongyang for imprisonment and torture. After almost a year of coerced confessions, beatings and a staged news conference, the crew was released following a negotiated settlement in which the U.S. apologized and pledged to stop spying on North Korea.

===== U.S. spy plane =====
On April 15, 1969, the U.S. Navy spy plane EC-121 was shot down over the Sea of Japan by North Korea; 31 American service men died. Historians theorize President Richard Nixon, embroiled in the Vietnam War, chose not to retaliate for fear of escalating the conflict to involve the Soviet Union and China.

===== Axe murder incident =====
On August 18, 1976, US Army Captain Arthur Bonifas and Lieutenant Mark Barrett were killed by the KPA with axes at Panmunjom when the Americans, over objections of North Koreans, continued trimming a tree that blocked the view of the United States Army–Republic of Korea Army military unit patrolling the Joint Security Area—an intensely guarded and combative area in the middle of the DMZ separating North and South Korea. President Gerald Ford responded with a show of force, authorizing DEFCON 3, a high state of military readiness. The North Korean government backed down and allowed the tree-cutting to go ahead in what the U.S. military termed "Operation Paul Bunyan." North Korean supreme leader Kim Il Sung said the incidents in the Joint Security Area were "regretful" but stopped short of meeting U.S. demands for a formal apology.

North Korea and the United States had little to no relations during this time, except through the structures created by the Korean Armistice Agreement.

Nonetheless, in the subsequent years, Kim Il Sung met with high-profile political and religious figures including US House Representative Stephen Solarz (D-NY) and Reverend Billy Graham. Kim had granted an interview to Selig S. Harrison of The Washington Post and Harrison Salisbury of The New York Times back in 1972.

=== Post–Cold War (1991–2017) ===
The Democratic People's Republic of Korea (commonly known as North Korea) and the Republic of Korea (commonly known as South Korea) were simultaneously admitted to the United Nations on 17 September 1991. The United States amongst others sponsored their admission, and the U.S. ambassador at the United Nations General Assembly, Thomas R. Pickering, gave a very warm welcome to the seven nations joining that day. The U.S. Department of State position became that North Korea is a member of United Nations and an independent state, defined to mean "a sovereign state with a definite territory recognized as independent by the US", but without diplomatic relations with the United States.

==== North Korea policy under Bill Clinton ====
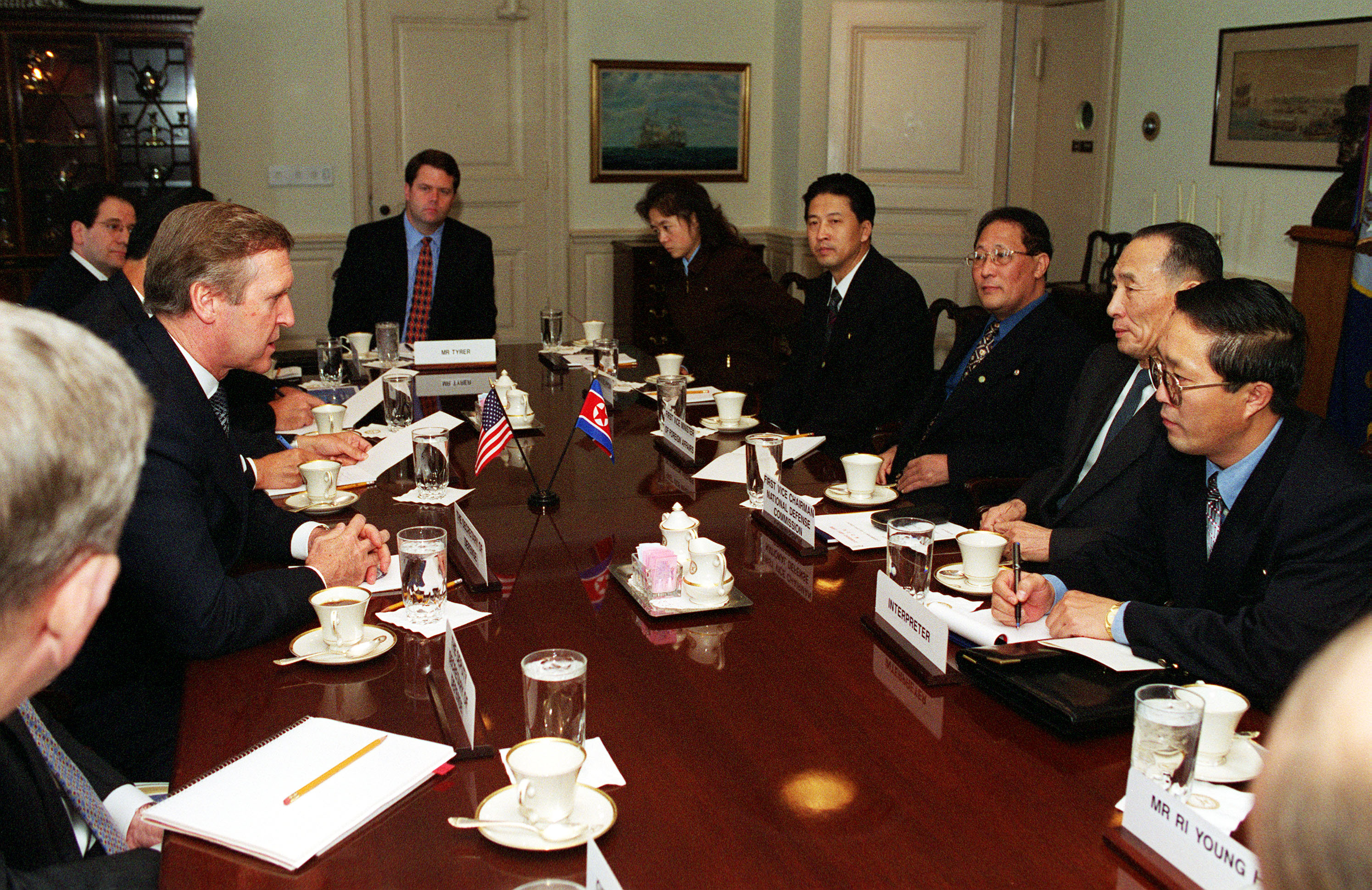
Jo Myong-rok (center right), Kim Jong Il's defence minister, with U.S. Secretary of Defense William Cohen, 2000

In 1994, North Korea blocked international inspectors from verifying the regime's adherence to the Nuclear Nonproliferation Treaty. The Bill Clinton administration believed that the North Koreans were processing plutonium from a reactor to build two atomic bombs.

President Clinton recalled that "I was determined to prevent North Korea from developing a nuclear arsenal, even at the risk of war". Declassified Clinton-era documents illustrate that the administration had planned for a possible war during the 1994 nuclear crisis.

According to former Pentagon officials, the Clinton administration drew plans to strike the North Korea nuclear reactor at Yongbyon.

President Clinton then sought Jimmy Carter's assistance in a North Korea peace mission, during which Carter negotiated an understanding with Kim. Carter outlined a treaty with Kim, which he announced to CNN without the Clinton administration's consent to spur American diplomatic action.

In December 1994 a US OH-58 Kiowa helicopter was shot down over North Korea, a pilot died and another was captured by North Korea and held for 13 days.

==== Confrontations during Bush administration ====
In December 2002, Spanish Navy troops, at the request of the U.S., boarded and detained a shipment of Scud missiles from North Korea destined for Yemen. After two days, following protests from Yemen and North Korea, the United States released the ship to continue its shipment to Yemen. This further strained the relationship between the US and North Korea, with North Korea characterizing the boarding an "act of piracy."

In September 2005, the US alleged that North Korea produced $15–25 million worth of counterfeit Federal Reserve supernotes over several years for worldwide distribution in a "direct attack on a protected U.S. asset.". Some governments questioned whether the DPRK had the capability to produce such high-quality notes.

Additionally, the U.S. accused Banco Delta Asia, a bank in Macau, of laundering money for North Korea's nuclear program, though the bank called the accusation a joke. In 2007, an audit by Ernst & Young found no evidence that Macau banks had facilitated North Korean money-laundering.

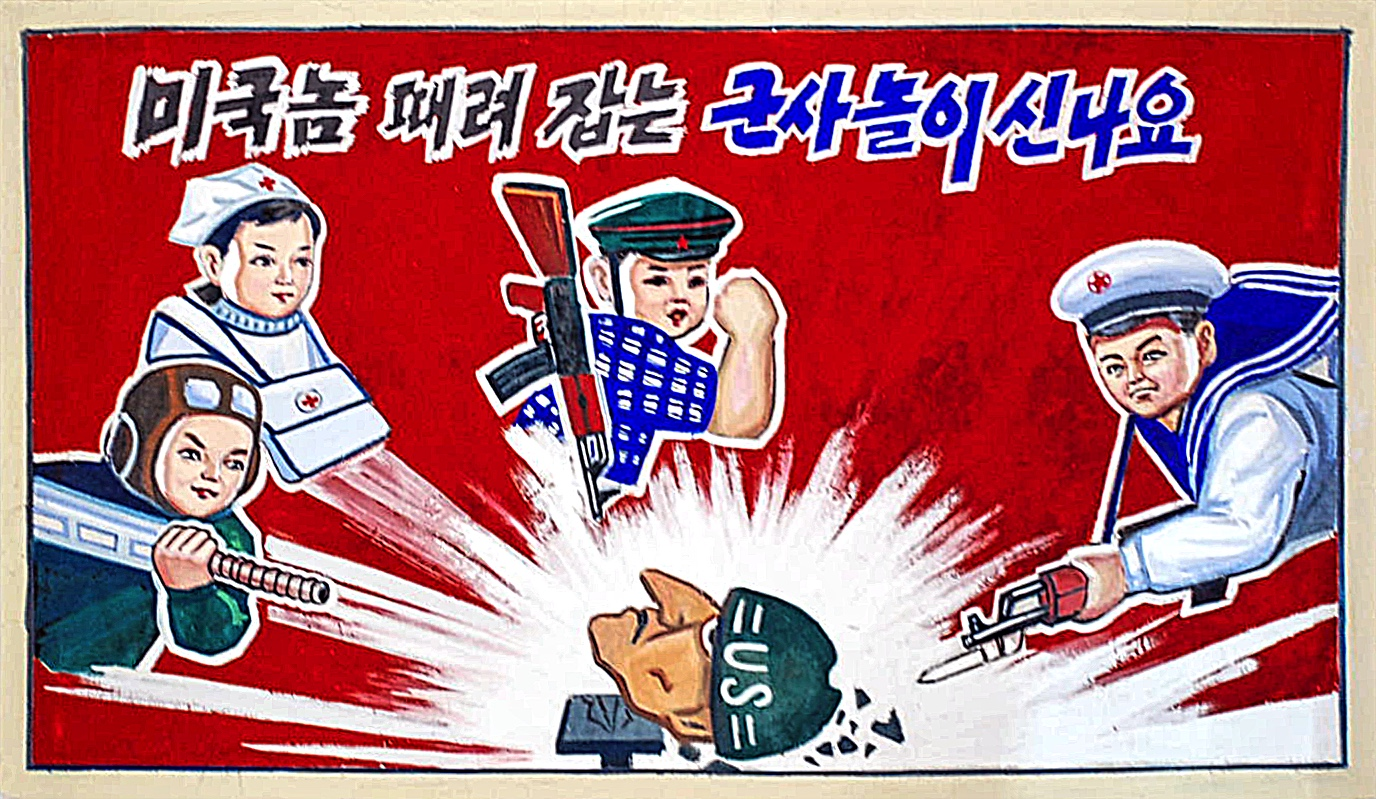
Propaganda poster in North Korean primary school, 2008

At various times during the Bush administration Dong Moon Joo, the president of The Washington Times, undertook unofficial diplomatic missions to North Korea in an effort to improve relations.

==== Steps towards normalization ====
On February 13, 2007, agreement in the Six-Party Talks – among the United States, the two Koreas, Japan, China, and Russia – called for other actions besides a path toward a denuclearized Korean peninsula. It also outlined steps toward the normalization of political relations with Pyongyang, a replacement of the Korean Armistice Agreement with a peace treaty, and the building of a regional peace structure for Northeast Asia.

In exchange for substantial fuel aid, North Korea agreed to shut down the Yongbyon nuclear facility. The United States also agreed to begin discussions on normalization of relations with North Korea, and to begin the process of removing North Korea from its list of state sponsors of terrorism. The US Chief Negotiator Christopher R. Hill stated North Korea has adhered to its commitments. The sixth round of talks commencing on March 19, 2007, discussed the future of the North Korean nuclear weapons program.

In early June 2008, the United States agreed to start lifting restrictions after North Korea began the disarming process. President George W. Bush announced he would remove North Korea from the list of state sponsors of terrorism after North Korea released a 60-page declaration of its nuclear activities. Shortly thereafter North Korean officials demolished the nuclear reactor at Yongbyon, considered a symbol of North Korea's nuclear program. The Bush administration praised the progress, but was criticized by many, including some within the administration, for settling for too little.

The United States public has historically favored diplomatic approaches over military ones in regards to North Korea. One study found that in 2004 the way the US government and the news media framed North Korea, led to such increased support for a non-military solutions among the American people.

==== Dai Hong Dan incident ====
The Mogadishu Encounter
- Part of Global War on Terrorism
Date	November 4, 2007
Location	Off the coast of Mogadishu, Somalia
Result	American–North Korean victory Crew rescued

Belligerents
United States; North Korea	Somali pirates

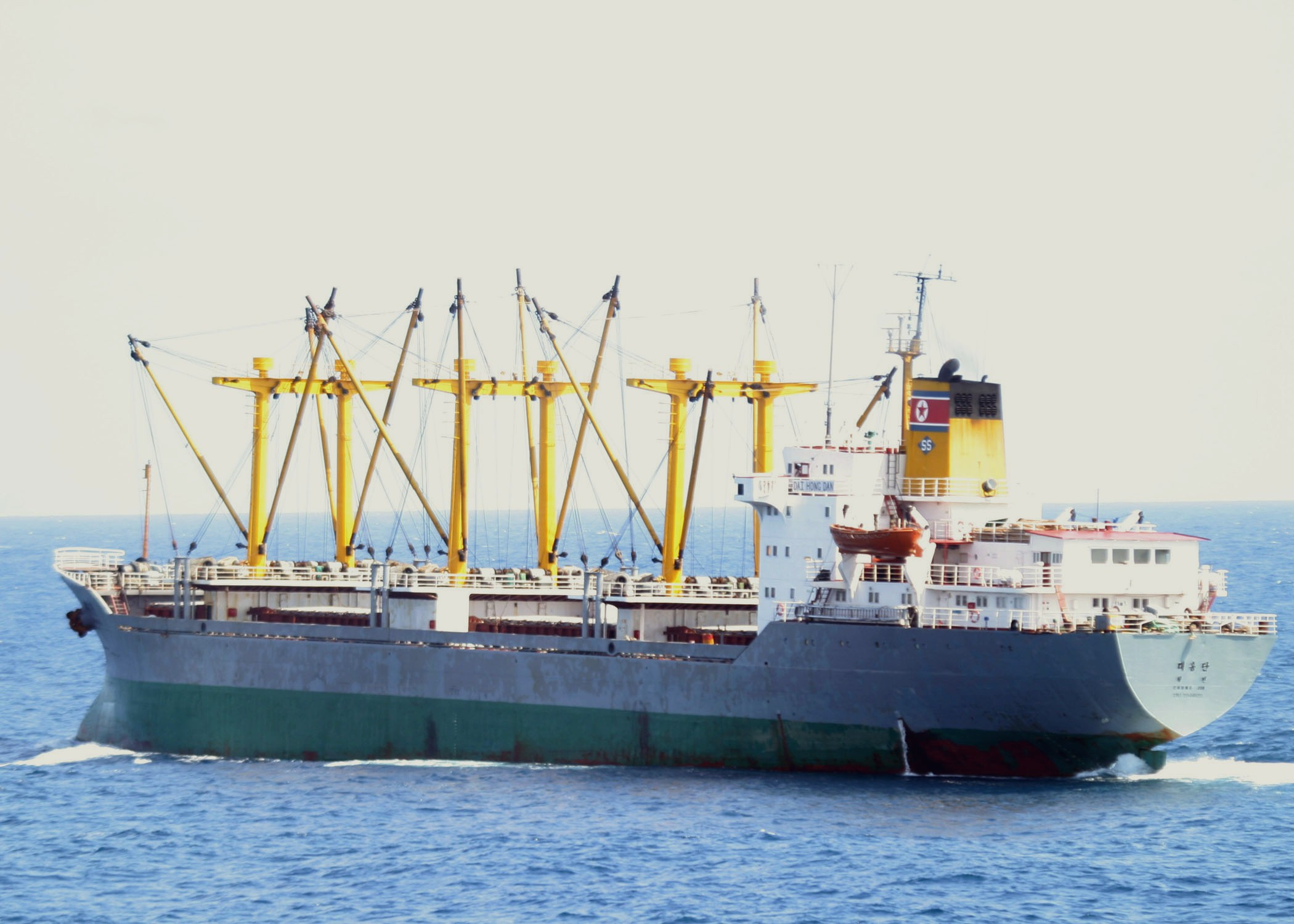
The U.S. Navy rescued the Dai Hong Dan crew from Somali pirates.

On November 4, 2007, Dai Hong Dan, a North Korean merchant vessel, was attacked by Somali pirates off the coast of Mogadishu who forced their way aboard, posing as guards. As U.S. Navy ships patrolling the waters moved to respond, the 22 North Korean seamen fought the eight Somali pirates in hand-to-hand combat. With aid from the crew of the United States Navy destroyer USS James E. Williams and a helicopter, the ship was freed, and permission was given to the U.S. crew to treat the wounded crew and pirates. This resulted in favorable comments from U.S. envoy in Beijing, Christopher R. Hill, as well as an exceedingly rare pro-U.S. statement in the North Korean press:

We feel grateful to the United States for its assistance given to our crewmen. This case serves as a symbol of the DPRK-U.S. cooperation in the struggle against terrorism.

The favorable result of the incident occurred at an important moment, as the North Koreans moved to implement the February 13 agreement with the acquiescence of the Bush administration, and the 2007 South Korean presidential election loomed, with the North Koreans taking pains to emphasize a more moderate policy.

==== New York Philharmonic visit ====
In February 2008, the New York Philharmonic visited North Korea. The concert was broadcast on Korean Central Television.

==== North Korean detention of American journalists ====
American-North Korean relations have further been strained by the arrest of two American journalists on March 17, 2009. The two journalists, Euna Lee and Laura Ling of Current TV, were arrested on the China–North Korea border while supposedly filming a documentary on the trafficking of women and allegedly crossing into North Korea in the process. North Korea subsequently tried the two journalists amid international protests and found them guilty of the charges, and sentenced them to twelve years of hard labor. Reporters without Borders criticized the act as a "sham trial".

The ordeal was finally resolved on August 4, when former President Bill Clinton arrived in Pyongyang in what he described as a "solely private mission" to secure the release of the two American journalists. He reportedly forwarded a message to General Secretary of the Workers' Party of Korea Kim Jong Il from then-U.S. President Barack Obama, but White House Press Secretary Robert Gibbs denied this claim. Clinton's discussions with Kim were reportedly on various issues regarding American-North Korean relations. On August 5, Kim issued a formal pardon to the two American journalists, who subsequently returned to Los Angeles with Clinton. The unannounced visit by Clinton was the first by a high-profile American official since 2000, and is reported to have drawn praise and understanding by the parties involved.

==== ROKS Cheonan sinking ====
On May 24, 2010, the United States set plans to participate in new military exercises with South Korea as a direct military response to the sinking of a South Korean warship by what officials called a North Korean torpedo.

On May 28, 2010, the official (North) Korean Central News Agency stated that "it is the United States that is behind the case of 'Cheonan.' The investigation was steered by the U.S. from its very outset." It also accused the United States of manipulating the investigation and named the administration of U.S. President Barack Obama directly of using the case for "escalating instability in the Asia-Pacific region, containing big powers and emerging unchallenged in the region." The report indicated to the United States to "behave itself, mindful of the grave consequences."

In July 2010, the DPRK government indefinitely postponed a scheduled talk at Panmunjom relating to the sinking. The meeting was intended as preparation for future talks at higher governmental levels.

==== Relations following Kim Jong Il's death ====
Kim Jong Il died December 17, 2011, and was succeeded by his son, Kim Jong Un. On March 16, 2012, North Korea announced it would launch its Kwangmyŏngsŏng-3 satellite to mark the 100th anniversary of the late Kim Il-sung's birthday. This announcement triggered American anxiety as satellite launches are technologically contiguous with missile launches. This tampered with Kim Jong Un's earlier optimistic overtures and generated speculation on the issues confronting the new and young leader back in North Korea. The United States also suspended food aid to North Korea in retaliation for the missile plans.

Daniel Russel, Special Assistant to the President and Senior Director of Asia, and Sydney Seiler flew to Pyongyang from Guam in August 2012 and stayed there for two days. A South Korean diplomatic source said "apparently President Barack Obama, who was then bidding for a second term in office, secretly sent the officials to North Korea to minimize disruptions to the U.S. presidential election." Other analysts say, "Nobody can rule out that such direct dialogue between Washington and Pyongyang will continue in the future."

However, on December 11, 2012, North Korea successfully launched a missile in contrast to its failure in March. The United States strongly condemned the action as it was widely believed that North Korea was developing long-range ballistic missile that could reach the West Coast of the United States.

On March 29, 2013, Kim Jong Un threatened the United States by "declaring that rockets were ready to be fired at American bases in the Pacific." The declaration was in response to two B2 stealth bombers that flew over the Korean peninsula on the day before. After Jong Un's declaration, the Pentagon called for an advanced missile defense system to the western Pacific on April 3. United States Secretary of Defense, Chuck Hagel, said that North Korea posed "a real and clear danger" to not only the United States, but Japan and South Korea as well. The deployment of the battery to the US territory of Guam is the biggest demonstration yet that Washington regards the confrontation with North Korea as more worrying than similar crises of the past few years. It also suggested they are preparing for long standoff. While visiting Seoul, South Korea on April 12, 2013, United States Secretary of State John Kerry said "North Korea will not be accepted as a nuclear power", and that a missile launch by North Korea would be a "huge mistake". On April 18, 2013, North Korea issued conditions for which any talks would take place with Washington D.C. or Seoul. They included lifting United Nations sanctions and an end to United States-South Korean Key Resolve military exercises.

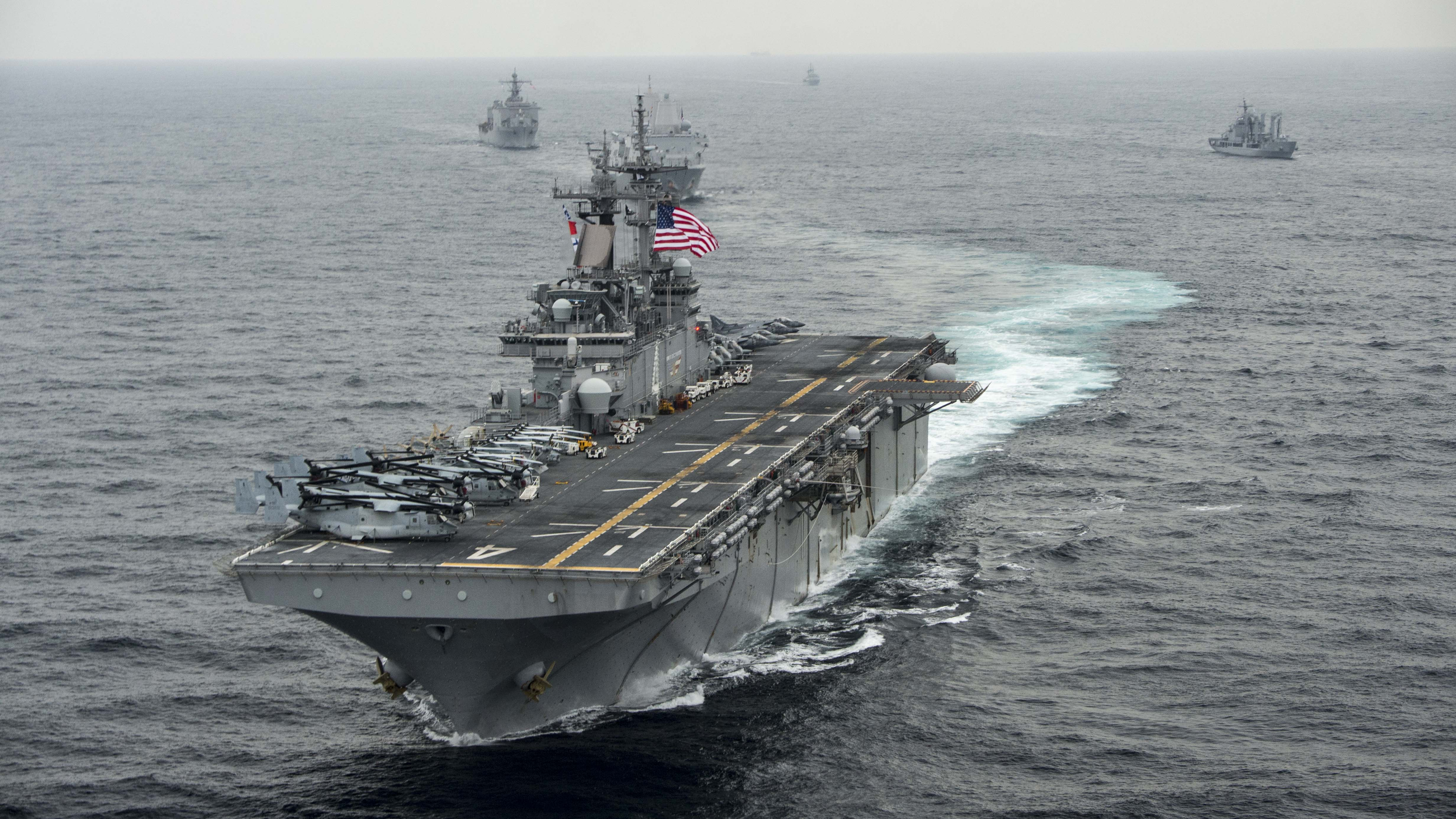
In March 2016, over 315,000 South Korean and U.S. soldiers participated in the largest military drills ever staged on the Korean Peninsula.

On April 26, 2013, North Korea said it had arrested Kenneth Bae, a U.S. citizen, for committing an unspecified crime against the country. On May 2, 2013, Bae was convicted of "hostile acts" and sentenced to 15 years of hard labor. The U.S. has called for his release but North Korea has rejected any possibility of allowing prominent Americans to visit the country to request his release. Dennis Rodman, who had previously visited North Korea and become friends with Kim Jong Un, tweeted a plea for Bae's release. Rodman said he would visit North Korea again in August and attempt to free Bae.

On May 2, 2014, Pyongyang's Korean Central News Agency (KCNA) released an article composed of four essays written by North Korean citizens. The content of the article carried heavy criticism and racist remarks towards U.S. President Barack Obama.

Two American citizens were detained in North Korea in June 2014, accused of "hostile acts". On July 28, 2014, the United States House of Representatives voted to pass the North Korea Sanctions Enforcement Act of 2013 (H.R. 1771; 113th Congress), but it was never passed by the Senate. On August 20, 2014, during annual U.S.–South Korea military drills, a spokesman for the North Korean government referred to Secretary of State John Kerry as a "wolf donning the mask of sheep", the latest in an exchange of taunts between U.S., South Korean, and North Korean government officials. In January 2015, U.S. President Barack Obama indicated that he believed that over time the North Korean government will collapse. On July 28, 2016, a North Korean top diplomat for U.S. affairs claimed that the United States crossed the "red line" for putting leader Kim Jong Un on its list of sanctioned individuals, which was perceived by officials as the United States declaring war.

==== Women cross DMZ ====
On May 24, 2015, International Women's Day for Disarmament, thirty women—including US feminist leader Gloria Steinem, two Nobel Peace laureates and retired U.S. Colonel Ann Wright—from 15 countries linked arms with 10,000 Korean women, stationing themselves on both sides of the DMZ to urge a formal end to the Korean War (1950–1953), the reunification of families divided during the war, and a peace building process with women in leadership positions to resolve decades of hostility.

In the weeks leading up to crossing the DMZ, Steinem told the press, "It's hard to imagine any more physical symbol of the insanity of dividing human beings."

On the day of the crossing, South Korea refused to give the women permission to walk through Panmunjom, a border town where the 1953 truce was signed, so the women had to eventually cross the border by bus. Nevertheless, Steinem labeled the crossing a success. "We have accomplished what no one said can be done, which is to be a trip for peace, for reconciliation, for human rights and a trip to which both governments agreed."

=== First Trump administration (2017–2021) ===
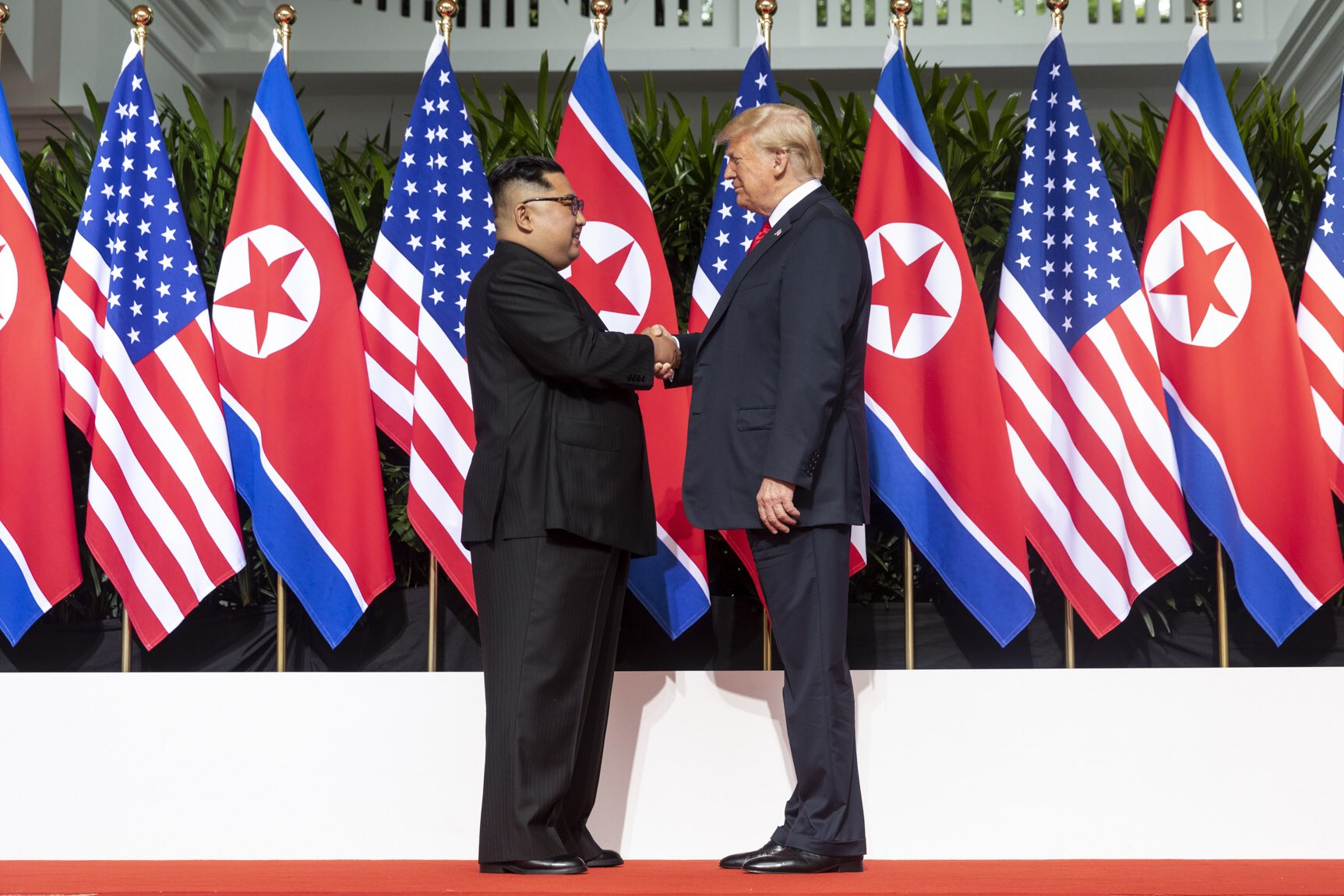
North Korean Leader Kim Jong Un (left) and U.S. President Donald Trump (right), June 2018.

In 2017, tensions mounted as U.S. President Donald Trump weighed military options against North Korea's ballistic missile program. In the second week of April 2017, global media outlets erroneously reported that the USS Carl Vinson supercarrier had been deployed to the Sea of Japan heading towards North Korea, as a result of confusion created by a "miscommunication" between the "Pentagon and the White House." A premature announcement on April 8 from the Navy led to a "glitch-ridden sequence of events". On April 17 North Korea's deputy United Nations ambassador accused the United States of "turning the Korean peninsula into "the world's biggest hotspot" and the North Korean government stated "its readiness to declare war on the United States if North Korean forces were to be attacked." President Donald Trump called Kim "Little Rocket Man" and a "sick puppy", and promised that continued North Korean threats to America "will be met with fire and fury like the world has never seen". President Trump has at times called diplomacy with the Kim regime "a waste of time". In reality on April 18, the Carl Vinson and its escorts were 3,500 miles from Korea engaged in scheduled joint Royal Australian Navy exercises in the Indian Ocean. The Carl Vinson aircraft carrier had been in the South China Sea in 2015 and again in February 2017 on routine patrols. In late April 2017, Trump stated that "[t]here is a chance that we [the United States] could end up having a major, major conflict with North Korea". According to New York Times correspondent Michael S. Schmidt, Trump proposed using a nuclear weapon against North Korea and blaming the attack on another country, but was dissuaded by John F. Kelly. In July 2017, U.S. Secretary of State Rex Tillerson authorized a "Geographical Travel Restriction" which banned Americans from entering North Korea. On August 30, 2018, the ban was extended until August 31, 2019.

==== 2017 detaining of US citizens ====
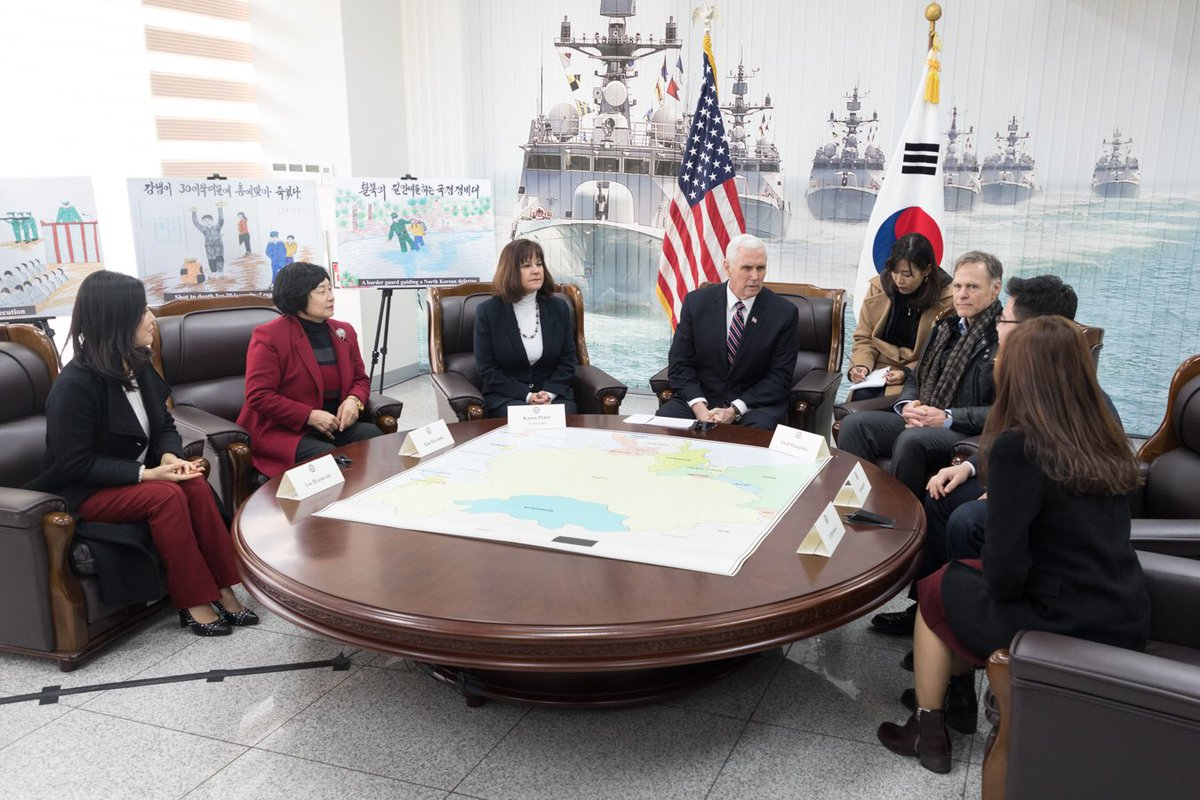
U.S. Vice President Mike Pence at Cheonan memorial with North Korean defectors and Fred Warmbier, February 8, 2018

An American citizen by the name of Tony Kim, also known by the Korean name of Kim Sang-duk, was detained while attempting to leave North Korea through Pyongyang International Airport. In January 2016, an American student, Otto Warmbier, was detained at Pyongyang International Airport after allegedly attempting to steal a propaganda poster from his hotel. The other members of his tour group, which including several U.S. citizens, were allowed to leave without incident. Hotel security footage allegedly showed Warmbier going into a staff-only area of the hotel and removing the poster from the wall. In March 2016, he was sentenced to 15 years of hard labor, but in June 2017 was released from North Korea, having suspiciously fallen into a coma-like state. He died a few days after being repatriated to the U.S. North Korea claimed that they had nothing to do with his death. The China-based travel company that took Warmbier to North Korea as part of a tourist group stated that it would no longer accept U.S. citizens on its tours to avoid similar incidents. After Americans heard about Warmbier's death, 49% wanted the administration to act, while 35% did not. Of those Americans who wanted action to be taken, the most popular response was for the U.S. to tighten sanctions on North Korea, and the second most popular was a total travel ban between the two countries. United States military action was the least popular response.

==== Nuclear Intelligence Report ====
In August 2017, The Washington Post reported on a confidential assessment carried out by the U.S. Defense Intelligence Agency which suggested that North Korea had successfully developed nuclear warheads for missiles within reach of the US mainland. Reacting to the report President Trump stated that future threats would be "met with fire and fury and frankly power, the likes of which this world has never seen before." In response North Korea announced that it was examining an operational plan to strike areas around the U.S. territory of Guam in the Pacific, including the Andersen Air Force Base. Officials stated that Joseph Y. Yun, the US envoy for North Korea policy, and Pak Song-il, a senior North Korean diplomat at the country's UN mission, were making regular contact during this dispute, through a conduit of communication they called the New York channel.

==== Trump and UN member states on North Korea's threats ====
On August 8, 2017, President Trump suggested that the United States was prepared to inflict "fire and fury" against North Korea if they failed to cease nuclear testing and threats. In response, North Korea issued a series of threats against the U.S. territory of Guam as well as allies such as Japan and South Korea. Two missiles were flown over Japanese territory and a nuclear test was conducted.

In a speech to the United Nations General Assembly in September 2017, Trump threatened to "totally destroy" North Korea if the United States were "forced to defend itself or its allies"; he repeated his recent nickname for Kim Jong Un as "Rocket Man". In response North Korean leader Kim Jong Un called the speech "unprecedented rude nonsense" and "mentally deranged behaviour".

On September 23, 2017, the U.S. Military flew B-1B bombers from Guam, along with F-15C Eagle fighter escorts from Okinawa, Japan flew in international airspace over waters east of North Korea. Unlike on previous missions, the U.S. aircraft were not accompanied by South Korean or Japanese planes. Afterward North Korea said a missile strike against the U.S. is "inevitable all the more".

On September 30, 2017, U.S. Secretary of State Rex Tillerson said the U.S. and North Korea were in "direct contact", and "probing" the possibility of talks.

On October 9, 2017, US Air Force B-1 bombers carried out mock missile launches off both coasts of South Korea. Two bombers operating out of Andersen Air Force Base in Guam carried out the drills along with fighter jets from the South Korean and Japan militaries. This was the first nighttime B-1 bomber exercise between the three allies.

On November 28, 2017, North Korea fired an intercontinental ballistic missile (ICBM) and it was the first such launch from the rogue regime in more than two months. The missile, believed to be an ICBM by the U.S. Military, was launched from Sain Ni, North Korea and flew roughly 620 miles before landing in the Sea of Japan.

==== 2018 Singapore Summit ====
On March 8, 2018, following a meeting with President Trump, South Korean diplomat Chung Eui-yong revealed that Kim Jong Un had expressed "eagerness" to meet with the President, and that his offer had been accepted, with a meeting proposed to take place before May. The move was described by South Korean President Moon Jae-in as a "miracle." The meeting had been scheduled to be held on June 12 in Singapore, although after military exercises between the United States and South Korea, Kim Jong Un threatened to pull out of the summit, and on May 24 President Trump cancelled it. On June 1, 2018, Trump announced that the summit was "back on" for June 12 in Singapore after meeting with North Korean officials at the White House. President Trump met with Chairman Kim on June 12. During the meeting, a historic agreement was signed between the two countries calling for North Korea to reaffirm its commitment to the 2017 Panmunjom Declaration signed between North and South Korean to work towards completely denuclearizing the entire Korean Peninsula. The agreement declared a new start to US-DPRK relations between the two countries to achieve "peace and prosperity" through cooperation on issues such as the recovery of POW/MIA remains. Trump subsequently announced that war game exercises between the US and South Korean militaries would end.

==== POW/MIA remains ====
Thousands of U.S. military personnel went missing during the Korean war. Between 1990 and 2018, North Korea returned the remains of 340 soldiers, but about 7,700 bodies were still unaccounted for. The June 12, 2018 summit between the US and North Korea included a vague agreement to begin repatriating American POW/MIA remains. One month later, North Korea returned 55 boxes to the US. They were accompanied by the military identification tag of only one person, but other servicemen could be identified through matching DNA, chest X-rays, and dental records. By October 2019, it was reported that 35–40 servicemen had been identified.

==== Aftermath ====
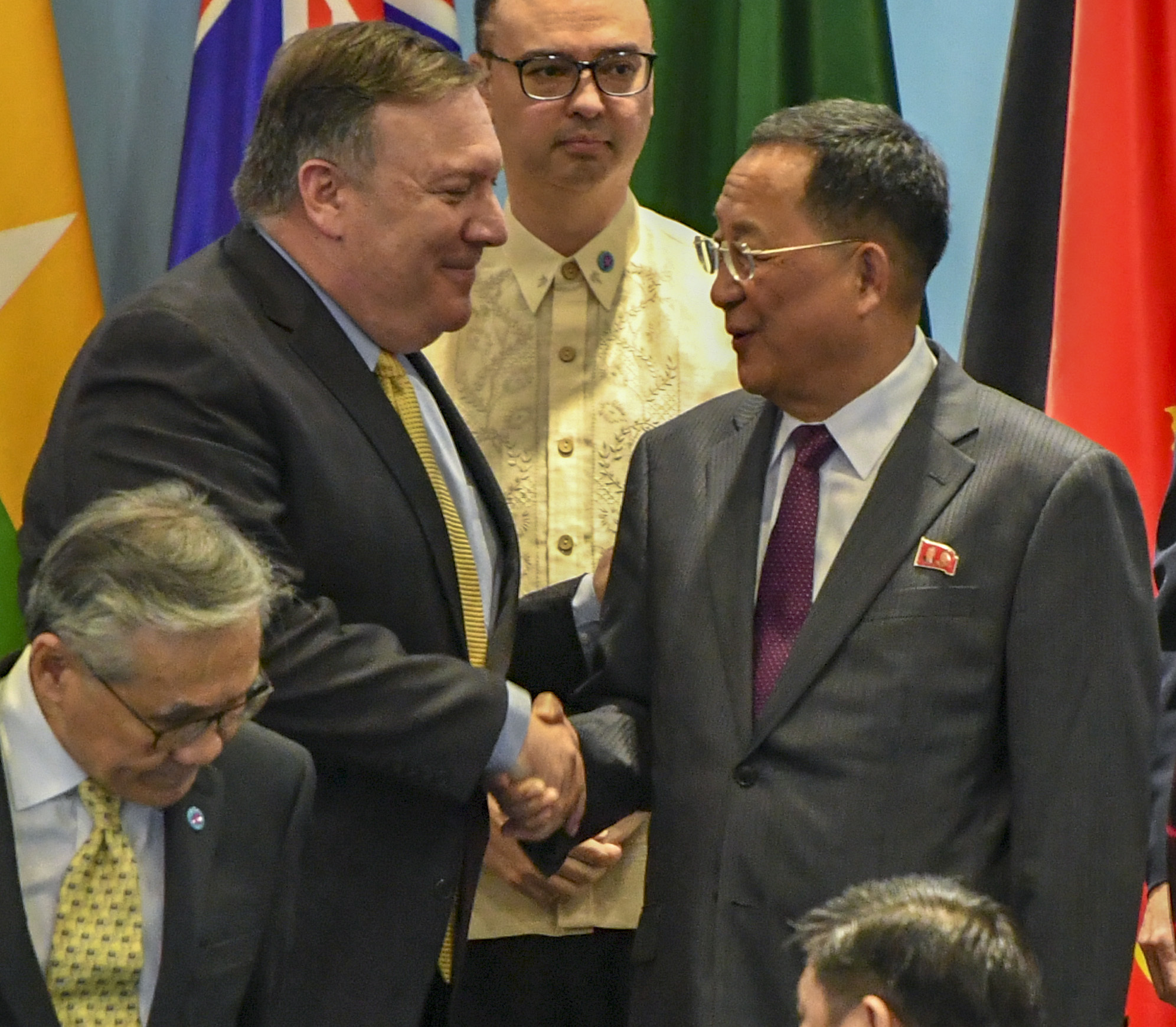
US Secretary of State Mike Pompeo shakes hands with North Korean Minister of Foreign Affairs Ri Yong Ho in August 2018

North Korea's state media declared a new era of peace following the summit. Reports emerged on June 23 that North Korea was removing anti-US propaganda.

On June 24, Trump stated that North Korea still posed an 'extraordinary threat' to the US and maintained sanctions on the country despite declaring them no longer a threat the day following the summit.

Secretary of State Mike Pompeo's first visit to North Korea in July 2018 invoked disgruntled remarks from Pyongyang that the Trump administration was using "unilateral and gangster-like demand for denuclearization". Pompeo maintained that the July talks were "productive". However, the International Atomic Energy Agency has since stated North Korea is continuing with their nuclear program, and Trump announced the cancellation of Secretary of State Pompeo's scheduled visit in August 2018 to North Korea due to insufficient progress in the dismantling of North Korea's nuclear weapons program.

Interactions between the Washington and Pyongyang continue to fluctuate following the September 2018 United Nations General Assembly. In his speech, President Trump commended Kim Jong Un for ceasing nuclear testing, dismantling several military facilities, releasing American hostages, and returning POW/MIA remains. Trump reaffirmed that sanctions will continue to be held on North Korea until denuclearization occurs.

==== Assault on North Korean embassy in Spain ====
On February 22, 2019, at around 3 pm a group of 10 people carrying real or simulated weapons entered the North Korean embassy in Madrid, Spain. They rounded up the eight embassy staffers who were present, put bags on their heads, tied them up, beat several of them and interrogated them. They robbed mobile phones and computer drives. The assault lasted for two hours, until Spanish policemen entered the building and the attackers fled in two of the embassy's cars. On March 13, Spanish police and intelligence services identified two of the attackers as CIA operatives. The CIA denied any involvement.

==== 2019 Hanoi Summit ====
The 2019 North Korea–United States Hanoi Summit was a two-day summit meeting between North Korean Supreme Leader Kim Jong Un and U.S. President Donald Trump, held in Vietnam on February 27–28, 2019. The leaders had intended to hold a signing ceremony on February 28, but the summit ended without a signed agreement. North Korea immediately resumed rebuilding its long-range rockets at its Sohae Launch Facility.

It was the second meeting between leaders of the North Korea and United States. It had been planned since the previous September, and its location and date was announced during President Trump's third State of the Union on February 5, 2019.

After the summit, President Trump said he believed North Korean leader Kim Jong Un's denial of personal knowledge about Otto Warmbier's treatment in North Korean custody. Trump contended that it was not to Kim's benefit to allow such abuse.

==== Plans for third summit and exchange of letters ====
On June 26, 2019, it was announced that talks were underway to hold a third US-North Korean summit. President Trump previously contended in April 2019 that a third summit "would be good," On June 12, 2019, President Trump announced that he received a letter from Kim Jong Un which he described as "beautiful". On June 22, 2019, an undated photo was also released by the North Korean government of Kim Jong Un reading a letter from President Trump. Kim described the letter as "excellent" and described President Trump as the "supreme leader" of the United States. However, Kim later denied that talks were still being held between North Korea and the United States, and relations still remained tense between North Korea and the US State Department.

==== 2019 DMZ Summit ====
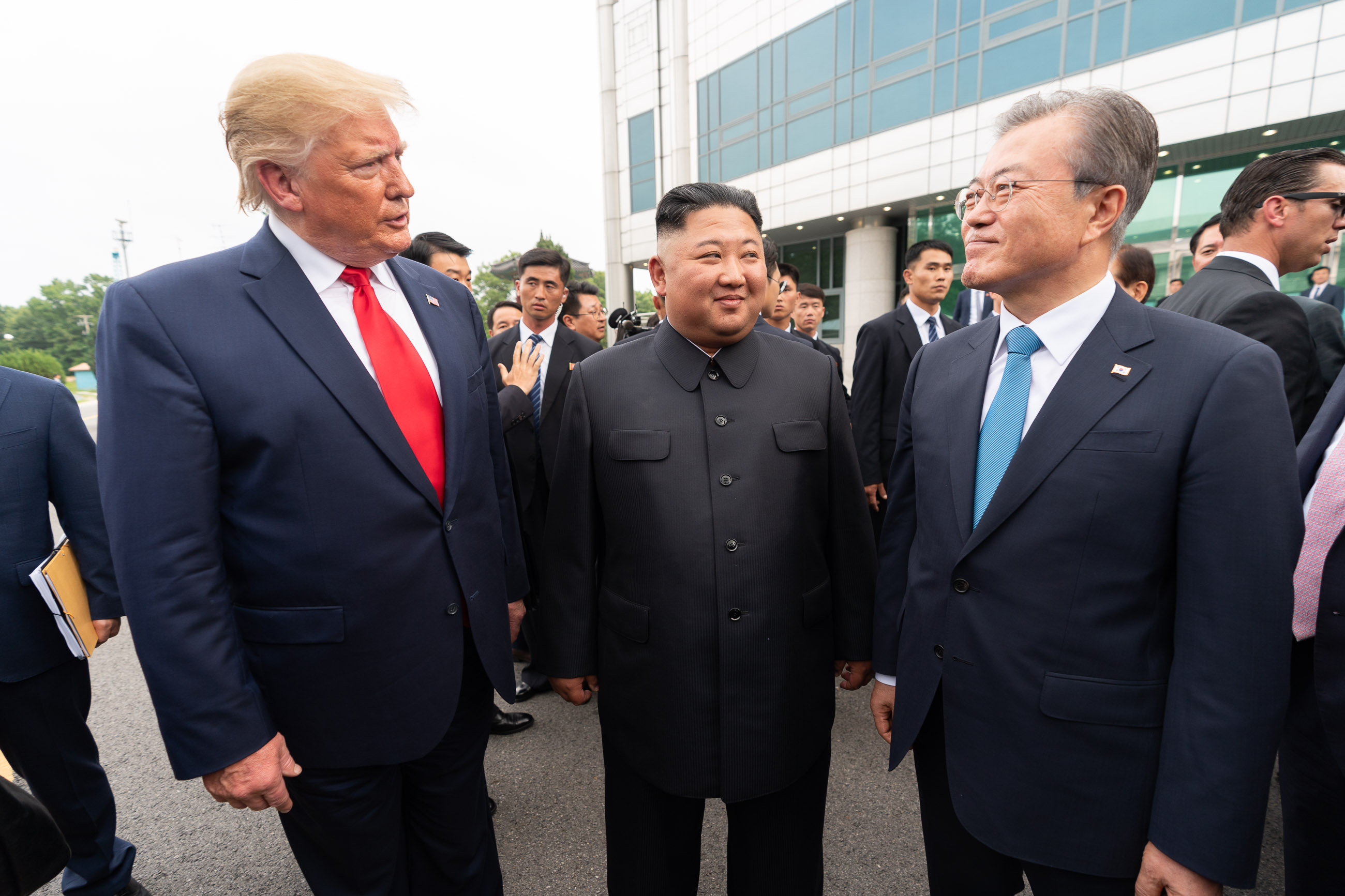
Trump (left), Kim (center), and Moon (right) in the demilitarized zone

On June 30, 2019, President Trump met with Kim along with Moon Jae-in at the DMZ and briefly crossed the border line into the North Korean side of the DMZ, making him the first sitting U.S. president to enter North Korea; former US Presidents Jimmy Carter and Bill Clinton had previously visited North Korea after they left office. After crossing into North Korea, Trump and Kim, who stated through an interpreter "it's good to see you again", "I never expected to meet you at this place" and "you are the first US President to cross the border," met and shook hands. Both men then briefly crossed the larger border line before crossing into South Korea. During their meeting, President Trump also invited Kim to the White House, although later acknowledged that it probably wouldn't happen in the near term.

It was also revealed that Trump's daughter Ivanka and her husband Jared Kushner had visited North Korea to meet with Kim beforehand and acted as lead American diplomats during the summit. Footage of Ivanka meeting with Kim was broadcast by the North Korean media. Ivanka also described her visit to North Korea as "surreal."

==== Later developments in 2019 and 2020 ====
In early 2019, a SEAL Team Six raid on North Korea failed to achieve its objective of planting a listening device that could intercept government communications after the SEALs opened fire on a civilian boat, killing 2 or 3 people.

On September 10, 2019, Trump said he fired National Security Adviser John Bolton as he strongly disagreed with Bolton's suggestion about applying Libyan model to North Korea. However, Bolton himself said he was not fired but resigned. Trump selected hostage negotiator with DPRK Robert C. O'Brien as the new National Security Adviser.

Talks in Stockholm began on 5 October 2019 between US and North Korean negotiating teams. After one day, the North Koreans said that talks had broken down, blaming US inflexibility. The US team, however, said discussions were good, and would be resumed in two weeks. On October 7, 2019, North Korea's chief negotiator Kim Myong Gil cautioned about a "terrible" event that might take place if the U.S. did not offer a better deal to Pyongyang. He said that the ball is currently in U.S.' court to resume dialogue.

In December 2019, US Ambassador to the United Nations Kelly Craft said during a meeting of the UN Security Council that was called at her request that the US was prepared to take "simultaneous steps" with North Korea to achieve peace. But she also warned the North Koreans against conducting further missile tests.

In April 2020, U.S. Rewards for Justice Program offered $5 million for information leading to identify North Korean hackers threatening the United States.

As of May 2020, North Korea has shown no indication that it is willing to unilaterally denuclearize as per U.S. intentions.

On June 12, 2020, the second anniversary of the Singapore summit, the North Korean Minister of Foreign Affairs released a press statement that the Trump administration efforts in the past two years were for political achievements without returns for North Korea and "Nothing is more hypocritical than an empty promise." North Korea subsequently cut communications with South Korea, demolished the four-story joint-liaison office building it shared with South Korea on June 17, and ceased efforts for diplomatic relations with the United States.

In an article written in the Hankyoreh daily newspaper in July 2020, Moon Chung-in, Special Advisor to South Korean President Moon Jae-in, argues that the hardline approach of John Bolton and other US figures concerning North Korean disarmament will lead to eventual war, not peace. He believes a more effective approach towards North Korean denuclearization is for the two Koreas to work together economically until both sides depend on each other enough to be invested in each other's national security.

=== Biden administration (2021–2025) ===
In early 2021, the United States under the presidency of Joe Biden attempted a new outreach to North Korea, to which they were unresponsive. On 18 March, the Korean Central News Agency put out a statement by North Korean first vice minister of Foreign Affairs Choe Son-hui acknowledging attempts at contact, and stating that North Korea would continue to ignore such attempts in the future. In it, she also criticized the United States for continuing military drills and maintaining sanctions against North Korea, and said that "no dialogue would be possible until the United States rolled back its hostile policy toward North Korea and both parties were able to exchange words on an equal basis."

In October 2021, Kim Jong Un said the United States was a continuing source of hostility, and he made a public appearance in a showroom of advanced weapons. These weapons included one that Kim identified as a newly tested type of hypersonic missile that is difficult to shoot down; a new type of low-flying cruise missile; and what may be the world's largest, but still untested, intercontinental ballistic missile.

On February 26, 2022, North Korea's foreign ministry stated that the US measures that "disregard" Russian security concerns are a "root cause of the Ukrainian crisis," in its first remark since Moscow launched a military invasion of its neighbour days earlier.

On March 5, 2022, North Korea conducted its ninth weapons test of the year, shooting a suspected ballistic missile into the sea east of the Korean peninsula, just days before the presidential election in South Korea. The launch was met with condemnation from the US, South Korea, and Japan, which worry the North is planning a major nuclear test in the coming months.

On March 11, 2022, after North Korea launched elements of its largest intercontinental ballistic missile in two recent tests, the US Treasury Department imposed fresh penalties.

In May 2022, the United States and South Korea announced expanded military exercises, which according to South Korean military officials would involve field training for the first time since 2018. A North Korean foreign ministry-run think tank stated that these exercises will create "unprecedented instability security-wise."

In December 2024, the plenary session of the Central Committee of the Workers' Party of Korea adopted what it called its "most hardline anti-U.S. response strategy", condemning its "anti-communist" policies and calling it the "most reactionary national entity". It also condemned America's alliances with Japan and South Korea as a "an aggressive nuclear military bloc" and called South Korea a "ardent anti-communist outpost". It said the policy would "strongly implemented for the prospective national interests and security guarantee of the DPRK".

=== Second Trump administration (2025–present) ===
On February 20, 2025, North Korea criticized the U.S. over the AUKUS nuclear submarine deal, claiming it was a threat to their regional stability and peace. The KCNA claimed that the U.S. aimed for regional hegemony, and warned that the nuclear states won't sit by idly.

North Korea test-fired strategic cruise missiles on February 26, 2025, to demonstrate its nuclear counter-attack capabilities, following its vow to respond to U.S. actions it deemed hostile. These launches came after heightened military provocations from the U.S. and its allies, including joint exercises with South Korea. The missile tests marked the fourth of the year and were overseen by Kim Jong Un. North Korea emphasized its readiness for a nuclear counterattack, with Kim expressing satisfaction over the results. Despite Trump's outreach, North Korea remains preoccupied with supporting Russia in its war against Ukraine, and experts suggest diplomacy with the U.S. is unlikely unless the situation with Russia changes.

In July 2025, Kim Yo Jong signaled openness to re-engage via talks with Washington on the condition that that the DPRK is accepted as a nuclear-armed state, stating that denuclearization talks would be deemed a "mockery." This was in response to White House Press Secretary Karoline Leavitt a month prior expressing Trump's desire to build on "progress" made at the 2018 Singapore summit. In a September 2025 speech, Kim Jong Un reiterated this position saying "If the U.S. drops its hollow obsession with denuclearization and wants to pursue peaceful coexistence with North Korea based on the recognition of reality, there is no reason for us not to sit down with the U.S."

On September 5, 2025, the New York Times reported that an unsuccessful covert action to place listening devices in North Korean territory had resulted in the deaths of two or three North Korean civilians.

Between late-February and early-March 2026, North Korea condemned United States and Israel's joint attack on Iran, which led to Ali Khamenei's death, as illegal.

In June 2026, North Korea's Foreign Ministry condemned a decision by the United States to sell advanced air-to-air missiles and related military equipment to South Korea, warning that the move would heighten tensions on the Korean Peninsula. According to the ministry, military cooperation between Washington and Seoul has been systematically strengthening. It characterized U.S. arms exports as "exports of war." In response, North Korea stated that it would continue to enhance its own defensive deterrent in order to preserve the regional balance of power. As noted in the source text, North Korea routinely criticizes joint U.S.–South Korean military exercises and cooperation, viewing them as preparation for war.

On November 13, 2026, U.S. Secretary of State Marco Rubio said during a speech at the Federalist Society that North Korea's nuclear weapon program was defensive in nature, saying Kim Jong Un "just wants to survive in his regime, and I’m not excusing the terrible things that have happened there,” and added "I’m just saying. But he’s not expansionist. He’s not looking to, like, invade Japan and invade China, whatever". He contrasted this with Iran, whose leadership he said were "expansionist" and "revolutionaries".

== Nuclear weapons ==
From January 1958 through 1991, the United States held nuclear weapons due to its diplomatic and military influence in South Korea for possible use against North Korea, peaking in number at some 950 warheads in 1967. Reports establish that these have since been removed but it has never confirmed by any independent 3rd party organization such as IAEA. The U.S. still maintains "the continuation of the extended deterrent offered by the U.S. nuclear umbrella".

In September 1956, the U.S. Chairman of the Joint Chiefs of Staff Admiral Radford told the U.S. Department of State that the U.S. military intention was to introduce atomic weapons into South Korea. In January 1957, the U.S. National Security Council began consideration of this proposal upon President Eisenhower's instruction, and then agreed to this. However, paragraph 13(d) of the Korean Armistice Agreement mandated that both sides should not introduce new types of weapons into South Korea, so preventing the introduction of nuclear weapons and missiles. The U.S. decided to unilaterally abrogate paragraph 13(d), breaking the Armistice Agreement, despite concerns by United Nations allies. At a June 21, 1957 meeting of the Military Armistice Commission the U.S. informed the North Korean representatives that the U.N. Command no longer considered itself bound by paragraph 13(d) of the armistice. In August 1957, NSC 5702/2 permitting the deployment of nuclear weapons in Korea was approved. In January 1958 nuclear armed Honest John missiles and 280mm atomic cannons were deployed to South Korea, a year later adding nuclear-armed Matador cruise missiles with the range to reach China and the Soviet Union.

North Korea denounced the abrogation of paragraph 13(d) as an attempt to wreck the armistice agreement and turn Korea into a U.S. atomic warfare zone. At the U.N. General Assembly in November 1957, the Soviet Union and Czechoslovakia condemned the decision of the United Nations Command to introduce nuclear weapons into Korea.

North Korea responded militarily by digging massive underground fortifications, and forwarded deployment of its conventional forces for a possible counterattack against the United States forces stationed in South Korea. In 1963, North Korea asked the Soviet Union for help in developing nuclear weapons, but was refused. However, instead the Soviet Union agreed to help North Korea develop a peaceful nuclear energy program, including the training of nuclear scientists. China later, after its nuclear tests, similarly rejected North Korean requests for help with developing nuclear weapons.

North Korea joined the Nuclear Non-Proliferation Treaty (NPT) as a non-nuclear weapons state in 1985, and North and South Korean talks begun in 1990 resulted in a 1992 Denuclearization Statement. However, US intelligence photos in early 1993 led the International Atomic Energy Agency (IAEA) to demand special inspection of the North's nuclear facilities, which prompted Kim Il Sung's March 1993 announcement of North Korea's withdrawal from the NPT. UN Security Council resolution 825 from May 11, 1993, urged North Korea to cooperate with the IAEA and to implement the 1992 North-South Denuclearization Statement. It also urged all member states to encourage North Korea to respond positively to this resolution and to facilitate a solution of the nuclear issue.

U.S.–North Korea talks began in June 1993 but with lack of progress in developing and implementing an agreement, North Koreans unloaded the core of a major nuclear reactor, which could have provided enough raw material for several nuclear weapons. With tensions high, Kim Il Sung invited former U.S. President Jimmy Carter to act as an intermediary. Carter accepted the invitation, but could only act as a private citizen not a government representative. Carter managed to bring the two states to the negotiating table, with Assistant Secretary of State for Political-Military Affairs Robert Gallucci representing the United States and North Korean Vice Foreign Minister Kang Sok-ju representing his country.

The negotiators successfully reached the U.S.–North Korea Agreed Framework in October 1994:

- North Korea agreed to freeze its existing plutonium enrichment program, to be monitored by the IAEA;
- Both sides agreed to cooperate to replace North Korea's graphite-moderated reactors with light water reactor (LWR) power plants, to be financed and supplied by an international consortium (later identified as the Korean Peninsula Energy Development Organization or KEDO) by a target date of 2003;
- The United States and North Korea agreed to work together to store safely the spent fuel from the five-megawatt reactor and dispose of it in a safe manner that does not involve reprocessing in North Korea;
- The United States agreed to provide shipments of heavy fuel oil to provide energy in the meantime;
- The two sides agreed to move toward full normalization of political and economic relations;
- Both sides agreed to work together for peace and security on a nuclear-free Korean Peninsula; and
- Both sides agreed to work together to strengthen the international nuclear non-proliferation regime.

Historians Paul Lauren, Gordon Craig, and Alexander George point out that the agreement suffered from a number of weaknesses. There was no specific schedule made for reciprocal moves, and the United States was granted a very long time to fulfill its obligations to replace the dangerous graphite-moderated reactors with LWRs. Furthermore, no organization was chosen "to monitor compliance, to supervise implementation ... or to make mid-course adjustments that might become necessary." Finally, other interested nations, like South Korea, China, and Japan, were not included in the negotiations.

Soon after the agreement was signed, U.S. Congress control changed to the Republican Party, who did not support the agreement. Some Republican senators were strongly against the agreement, regarding it as appeasement.

In accordance with the terms of the Agreed Framework, North Korea decided to freeze its nuclear program and cooperate with United States and IAEA verification efforts, and in January 1995 the U.S. eased economic sanctions against North Korea. Initially U.S. Department of Defense emergency funds not under Congress control were used to fund the transitional oil supplies under the agreement, together with international funding. From 1996 Congress provided funding, though not always sufficient amounts. Consequently, some of the agreed transitional oil supplies were delivered late. KEDO's first director, Stephen W. Bosworth, later commented "The Agreed Framework was a political orphan within two weeks after its signature".

In January 1995, as called for in the Agreed Framework, the United States and North Korea negotiated a method to safely store the spent fuel from the five-megawatt reactor. According to this method, U.S. and North Korean operators would work together to can the spent fuel and store the canisters in the spent fuel pond. Actual canning began in 1995. In April 2000, canning of all accessible spent fuel rods and rod fragments was declared complete.

North Korea agreed to accept the decisions of KEDO, the financier and supplier of the LWRs, with respect to provision of the reactors. International funding for the LWR replacement power plants had to be sought. Formal invitations to bid were not issued until 1998, by which time the delays were infuriating North Korea. In May 1998, North Korea warned it would restart nuclear research if the U.S. could not install the LWR. KEDO subsequently identified Sinpo as the LWR project site, and a formal ground breaking was held on the site on August 21, 1997. In December 1999, KEDO and the (South) Korea Electric Power Corporation (KEPCO) signed the Turnkey Contract (TKC), permitting full scale construction of the LWRs, but significant spending on the LWR project did not commence until 2000.

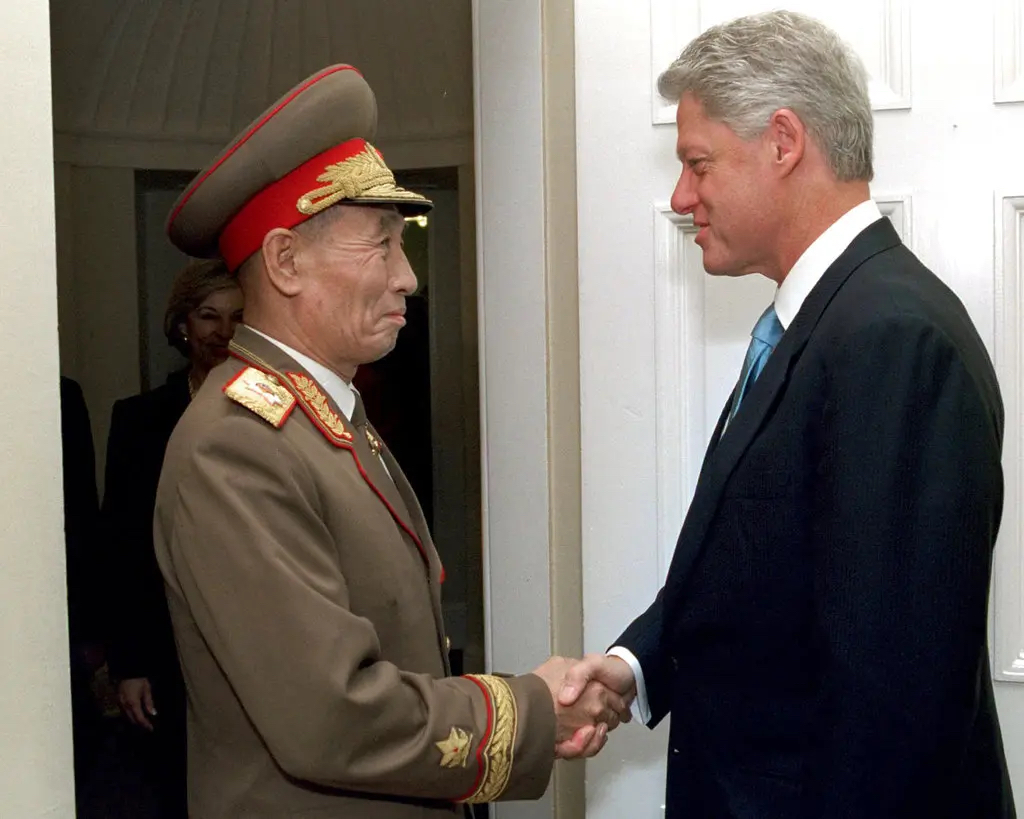
Vice Marshal Jo Myong-rok meets Bill Clinton at the White House, October 2000.

In 1998, the United States identified an underground site in Kumchang-ni, which it suspected of being nuclear-related following a Defense Intelligence Agency assessment. In March 1999, North Korea agreed to grant the U.S. "satisfactory access" to the site. The U.S. inspection in spring 1999 showed that the Defense Intelligence Agency assessment was wrong. In October 2000, during Special Envoy Jo Myong Rok's visit to Washington, and after two visits to the site by teams of U.S. experts, the U.S. announced in a Joint Communiqué with North Korea that U.S. concerns about the site had been resolved.

As called for in Dr. William Perry's official review of U.S. policy toward North Korea, the United States and North Korea launched new negotiations in May 2000 called the Agreed Framework Implementation Talks.

George W. Bush announced his opposition to the Agreed Framework during his candidacy in the 2000 United States presidential election. Following his inauguration in January 2001, the new administration began a review of its policy toward North Korea. At the conclusion of that review, the administration announced on June 6, 2001, that it had decided to pursue continued dialogue with North Korea on the full range of issues of concern to the administration, including North Korea's conventional force posture, missile development and export programs, human rights practices, and humanitarian issues. As of that time, the Light Water Reactors (LWRs) promised in the Agreed Framework had not been delivered. The two reactors were finally supplied by the Swiss-based company ABB in 2000 in a $200 million deal. The ABB contract was to deliver equipment and services for two nuclear power stations at Kumho, on North Korea's east coast. Donald Rumsfeld, the US secretary of defense, was on the board of ABB when it won this deal, but a Pentagon spokeswoman, Victoria Clarke, said that Rumsfeld does not recall it being brought before the board at any time. Construction of these reactors was eventually suspended.

In 2002 the US Government announced that it would release $95m to North Korea as part of the Agreed Framework. In releasing the funding, President George W Bush waived the Framework's requirement that North Korea allow inspectors to ensure it has not hidden away any weapons-grade plutonium from the original reactors. President Bush argued that the decision was "vital to the national security interests of the United States".

In 2002, the administration asserted that North Korea was developing a uranium enrichment program for nuclear weapons purposes. American-DPRK tensions mounted when Bush categorized North Korea as part of the "Axis of Evil" in his 2002 State of the Union address.

When U.S.-DPRK direct dialogue resumed in October 2002, this uranium-enrichment program was high on the U.S. agenda. North Korean officials acknowledged to a U.S. delegation, headed by Assistant Secretary of State for East Asian and Pacific Affairs James A. Kelly, the existence of the uranium enrichment program. Such a program violated North Korea's obligations under the NPT and its commitments in the 1992 North-South Denuclearization Declaration and the 1994 Agreed Framework. The U.S. side stated that North Korea would have to terminate the program before any further progress could be made in U.S.-DPRK relations. The U.S. side also claimed that if this program was verifiably eliminated, the U.S. would be prepared to work with DPRK on the development of a fundamentally new relationship. In November 2002, the members of KEDO agreed to suspend heavy fuel oil shipments to North Korea pending a resolution of the nuclear dispute.

Following Kim Jong Il's death on December 17, 2011, his son Kim Jong Un inherited the regime. The latter announced on February 29, 2012, that North Korea will freeze nuclear tests, long-range missile launches, and uranium enrichment at its Yongbyon plant. In addition, the new leader invited international nuclear inspectors who were ejected in 2009. The Obama administration responded by offering 240,000 tonnes of food, chiefly in the form of biscuits. This indicated a softening of the west regarding North Korea's insistence that food aid must comprise grains.

In late 2002 and early 2003, North Korea terminated the freeze on its existing plutonium-based nuclear facilities, expelled IAEA inspectors and removed seals and monitoring equipment, quit the NPT, and resumed reprocessing of spent nuclear fuel to extract plutonium for weapons purposes. North Korea subsequently announced that it was taking these steps to provide itself with a deterrent force in the face of U.S. threats and the U.S.'s "hostile policy". Beginning in mid-2003, the North repeatedly claimed to have completed reprocessing of the spent fuel rods previously frozen at Yongbyon and lain cooperation with North Korea's neighbors, who have also expressed concern over the threat to regional stability and security they believe it poses. The Bush administration's stated goal is the complete, verifiable, and irreversible elimination of North Korea's nuclear weapons program. North Korea's neighbors have joined the United States in supporting a nuclear weapons-free Korean Peninsula. U.S. actions, however, had been much more hostile to normalized relations with North Korea, and the administration continued to suggest regime change as a primary goal. The Bush administration had consistently resisted two-party talks with the DPRK. A September 2005 agreement took place only after the Chinese government threatened to publicly accuse the U.S. of refusal to engage in negotiations.

In October 2024, Kim Jong Un visited North Korean missile bases, stressing the need for strong nuclear deterrence against U.S. threats and prioritizing missile modernization efforts.

=== Six-party talks ===
In early 2003, multilateral talks were proposed to be held among the six most relevant parties aimed at reaching a settlement through diplomatic means. North Korea initially opposed such a process, maintaining that the nuclear dispute was purely a bilateral matter between themselves and the United States. However, under pressure from its neighbors and with the active involvement of China, North Korea agreed to preliminary three-party talks with China and the United States in Beijing in April 2003.

After this meeting, North Korea then agreed to six-party talks, between the United States, North Korea, South Korea, China, Japan, and Russia. The first round of talks were held in August 2003, with subsequent rounds being held at regular intervals. After 13 months of freezing talks between the fifth round's first and second phases, North Korea returned to the talks. This behavior was in retaliation for the US's action of freezing offshore North Korean bank accounts in Macau. In early 2005, the US government told its East Asia allies that Pyongyang had exported nuclear material to Libya. This backfired when Asian allies discovered that the US government had concealed the involvement of Pakistan; a key U.S. ally was the weapon's middle man. In March 2005, Condoleezza Rice had to travel to East Asia in an effort to repair the damage.

The third phase of the fifth round of talks held on February 8, 2007, concluded with a landmark action-for-action agreement. Goodwill by all sides has led to the US unfreezing all of the North Korean assets on March 19, 2007.

As of October 11, 2008, North Korea has agreed to all U.S. nuclear inspection demands, and the Bush administration responded by removing North Korea from a terrorism blacklist despite the American government threatening to end negotiations.

=== Removal from terror list ===
On October 11, 2008, the U.S. and North Korea secured an agreement in which North Korea agreed to resume disarmament of its nuclear program and once again allowed inspectors to conduct forensic tests of its available nuclear materials. The North also agreed to provide full details on its long-rumored uranium program. These latest developments culminated in North Korea's long-awaited removal from America's "State Sponsors of Terrorism" list on the same day.

=== Nuclear tests ===
==== 2006 ====
U.S. intelligence agencies confirmed that a test occurred. Tony Snow, President George W. Bush's White House Press Secretary, said that the United States would go to the United Nations to determine "what our next steps should be in response to this very serious step." On Monday, October 9, 2006, President Bush stated in a televised speech that such a claim of a test is a "provocative act" and the U.S. condemns such acts. President Bush stated that the United States is "committed to diplomacy" but will "continue to protect America and America's interests." The Six-Party Talks, below, resulted.

==== 2009 ====
On May 25, 2009, American-North Korean relations further deteriorated when North Korea conducted yet another nuclear test, the first since the 2006 test. The test was once again conducted underground and exploded with a yield comparable to the Little Boy and Fat Man bombs that destroyed Hiroshima and Nagasaki, respectively. The United States reacted favorably to China and Russia's reactions, who condemned North Korea's actions even though they are both strong allies of North Korea. The U.S., along with all other members of the stalled six-party talks, strongly condemned the test and said that North Korea would "pay a price for its actions."

==== 2013 ====
On January 24, 2013, officials in North Korea openly stated that they intended to plan out a third nuclear test. A written statement from the National Defence Commission of North Korea stated "a nuclear test of higher level will target against the U.S., the sworn enemy of the Korean people." The United States intelligence community believes that, as of January 2013, North Korea has the capability to target Hawaii with its current technology and resources, and could reach the contiguous United States within three years. The White House has declared the Korean statement as "needlessly provocative" and that "further provocations would only increase Pyongyang's isolation." Analysis of satellite photos done by the U.S.-Korea Institute at Johns Hopkins School of Advanced International Studies of the Punggye-ri nuclear test site indicates that North Korea was readying for nuclear tests at the same time it issued the threat. Later statements by North Korea included direct threats against South Korea as well, stating that North Korea "will take strong physical counter-measures against" the South in response to UN sanctions against the North. A Gallup poll that was done in 2013 revealed that, "Americans (55%) said the U.S. should defend South Korea if it was attacked by its northern neighbor, while about a third (34%) said it should not."

On February 12, 2013, North Korea conducted a third nuclear test.

==== 2016 ====
On January 6, 2016, North Korea conducted a fourth nuclear test. North Korean officials also announced that North Korean scientists have miniaturized nuclear weapons.

In February 2016, President Barack Obama enacted the North Korea Sanctions and Policy Enhancement Act of 2016, which passed the House of Representatives and the Senate with nearly unanimous support. The Inquisitr reported: "In February, President Obama hit North Korea with a round of congressionally approved sanctions that severely limits the growth of the North Korean economy, a move that China criticized, stating that the sanctions could cripple North Korea's economy."

== Public opinion on North Korea ==
During Donald Trump's first presidency, he and North Korean leader Kim Jong Un exchanged insults on numerous occasions. Trump often took to Twitter to talk about Kim Jong Un and the current North Korea situation. The situation had seriously elevated, worrying many Americans. A portion of Americans (22%) thought that North Korea posed a serious threat to the United States, while 60% of Americans thought it was no threat at all. Many Americans showed doubt and sometimes outright opposition to then-President Trump during the crisis. A plurality of Americans believed Trump lacked the responsibility to handle the North Korea situation, and many had more trust in U.S. military leaders than they did in Trump. Still, many Americans seemed to be unsure on who they are more comfortable with handling the situation. Americans were still hesitant of military action, as a majority of Americans still oppose preemptive military intervention. Top people within the military and government see this situation escalating to military action, while some still have hope that peace is possible. Still, the U.S. continues to impose sanctions on North Korea.

Response	Percentage
Threat-serious	70%
Threat-not serious	13%
Does not pose threat	14%
No opinion	3%

Q: How much do you trust Donald Trump to act responsibly in handling the situation involving North Korea – a great deal, a good amount, just some or not at all?

Answer	Percentage
Great deal	23%
Good amount	14%
Just some	20%
Not at all	42%
No opinion	1%

Q: How much do you trust North Korean leader Kim Jong Un to act responsibly in handling the situation involving North Korea – a great deal, a good amount, just some or not at all?

Answer	Percentage
A great deal	4%
A good amount	3%
Just some	13%
Not at all	76%
No opinion	3%

Q: How much do you trust U.S. military leaders to act responsibly in handling the situation involving North Korea – a great deal, a good amount, just some or not at all?

Answer	Percentage
A great deal	43%
A good amount	29%
Just some	20%
Not at all	7%
No opinion	2%

Q: To try to get North Korea to give up its nuclear weapons, would you support or oppose the U.S. offering North Korea financial incentives such as aid money, or more trade?

	Support	Oppose
All adults	32%	61%
Registered voters	31%	63%

Q: To try to get North Korea to give up its nuclear weapons, would you support or oppose the U.S. bombing North Korean military targets?

	Support	Oppose
All adults	39%	54%
Registered voters	42%	52%

Q: To try to get North Korea to give up its nuclear weapons, would you support or oppose the U.S. agreeing to stop conducting U.S. military exercises with South Korea?

	Support	Oppose
All adults	43%	47%
Registered voters	40%	51%

Q: In general, should the U.S. (launch a military strike on North Korea first, before it can attack America or U.S. allies) or should the U.S. (only attack North Korea if it attacks America or U.S. allies)?

	U.S. should launch a military strike on North Korea first	U.S. should only attack if North Korea attacks first
All adults	23%	67%
Registered Voters	22%	68%

Q: If the U.S. launched a military strike on North Korea first, do you think it would or would not risk starting a larger war in East Asia? IF RISK: Do you think that would be a major risk; or a risk, but not major? (Results by all adults)

Answer	Percentage
Risk, MAJOR	69%
Risk, NOT MAJOR	13%
Not a risk	13%
No opinion	5%

However, although Americans are inclined to defensive and/or pacifist positions against North Korea, the Global Attitudes Survey conducted by the Pew Research Center in the spring of 2017 suggests how a majority of Americans (64%) expects U.S. military intervention if one of its Pacific allies (particularly Japan and South Korea) were to come into military conflict with North Korea. In contrast, the survey points to how 30% of Americans are opposed to such interventionism. In both a parallel and comparative perspective, a majority of South Korean and Japanese citizens (91% and 82% respectively) also expect U.S. military intervention if their country was attacked by North Korea.

In 2023, North Korea's state newspaper Rodong Sinmun reported that approximately 800,000 students and employees nationwide voiced an interest in joining or reenlisting in the military to fight against the United States on Friday (17 March).

According to a 2026 Gallup poll, only 13% of Americans have favorable opinions of North Korea, while 82% have an unfavorable opinion. This was the most negative ranking Americans gave out of the 21 foreign countries surveyed.

== See also ==
- Human rights in North Korea
- Koreans in New York City
- Korean conflict
- List of foreign nationals detained in North Korea
- List of North Korean missile tests
- Proliferation Security Initiative
- South Korea–United States relations
- North Korea–South Korea relations
- List of United States special representatives for North Korea
- Economy of North Korea
- 2018–19 Korean peace process
- CIA activities in North Korea
