= CIA activities in North Korea =

CIA activities in North Korea began primarily at the beginning of the Cold War in 1949. At the time, the U.S. viewed North Korea or the Democratic People's Republic of Korea (DPRK) as a Soviet puppet regime (country controlled by Soviet powers). This posed a threat to the U.S. government, and the Central Intelligence Agency (CIA) began to focus more of its resources towards the DPRK. During the Cold War, the CIA gathered crucial intelligence regarding the DPRK such as its plans and capacities regarding an attack on America and its ally, South Korea. In later history, the CIA and sixteen other U.S. intelligence agencies have primarily focused strictly on the DPRK's weapons and capabilities (potentially successful long-range ballistic missiles and nuclear weapons).

== 1949 ==
=== Intelligence analysis ===
In the 16 July 1949 Weekly Summary, the Agency described North Korea as a Soviet puppet regime. On 29 October, a Weekly Summary states that a North Korean attack on the South is possible as early as 1949, and cites reports of road improvements towards the border and troop movements there.

== 1950s to 1970s ==
=== Intelligence analysis (related non-CIA) ===
In April 1950, the Army Security Agency, a SIGINT agency operating before the creation of NSA, undertook a limited "search and development" study of DPRK traffic. CIA received its reports. Two positions the second case, as revealed in COMINT, large shipments of bandages and medicines went from the USSR to North Korea and Manchuria, starting in February 1950. These two actions made sense only in hindsight, after the invasion of South Korea occurred in June 1950.

By the spring of 1950, North Korea's preparations for war had become...recognizable. Monthly CIA reports describe the military buildup of DPRK forces, but also discount the possibility of an actual invasion. It was believed that DPRK forces could not mount a successful attack without Soviet assistance, and such assistance would indicate a worldwide Communist offensive. There were no indications in Europe that such an offensive was in preparation.

Some North Korean communications were intercepted between May 1949 and April 1950 because the operators were using Soviet communications procedures. Coverage was dropped after analysts confirmed the material's non-Soviet origin.

==== Intelligence analysis (CIA) ====
On 6 June, CIA reported another interesting international development: all East Asian senior Soviet diplomats were recalled to Moscow for consultations. The CIA believed the purpose of the recall was to develop a new plan to counter anti-communist efforts in the region.

On 20 June 1950, the CIA published a report, based primarily on human assets, concluding that the DPRK could invade the South at any time. President Truman, Secretary of State Acheson, and Secretary of Defense Johnson all received copies of this report.

On 25 June of that same year, the Army of the Democratic People's Republic of Korea (it would not be renamed the "Korean People's Army" until later) invaded across the 38th parallel. This was a surprise to US intelligence.

=== Covert operations ===
During the 1950s, the CIA parachuted into North Korea some of the Korean agents it had trained, until sometime in the 1970s. During the 1950s, hundreds of agents were sent to establish resistance networks in North Korea.

== 1996 ==
=== Intelligence analysis ===
A report obtained from a "secret" Russian foreign ministry meeting states that North Korea's Nodong-1 is "not useful as a military weapon", based on its poor performance in all areas during a test-firing in the Sea of Japan in 1993. The report quoted Yu Min in the Seoul Sinmun, 5 January 1996, p.2.

On 2 February, Director of Central Intelligence John Deutch tells a United States Senate Select Committee that North Korea is developing long-range missiles. The United States, according to Deutch, should focus on stopping North Korea from acquiring guidance-and-control technology that could make its long-range missiles more accurate and lethal.

In a 9 May article in Aerospace Daily, pp.233–234, a National Security Council director, Robert G. Bell, says that a United States National Intelligence Estimate that concluded that no new strategic missile system will threaten the continental United States reflects a consensus within the United States intelligence community. Bell admits, however, that the intelligence community's knowledge of North Korea's Taepodong-2 program is incomplete.

According to Bill Gertz of The Washington Times, CIA sources said North Korea delivered seven shiploads of Scud-C missiles to Egypt between March and April 1996. The missile shipments were part of a 1980s licensing agreement between Egypt and North Korea.

On December 11, according to Barbara Starr of Jane's Defence Weekly (p.10), former CIA Director Robert Gates told the United States Senate Intelligence Committee that North Korea is having problems developing its Taepodong class of ballistic missiles. He said that research and development were needed for a completely new propulsion system, plus improved guidance. Gates said that economic, technical, and manufacturing problems in North Korea's infrastructure make the development of this new class of missiles unlikely. The US intelligence community was confident that the first flight tests of the missile will provide at least five years warning before deployment.

== See also ==
- North Korea–United States relations
- Korean conflict
