= Africa–North Korea relations =

Multilateral relations

Africa

North Korea

Africa–North Korea relations refers to the diplomatic relations between the Democratic People's Republic of Korea (North Korea) and the continent of Africa. Many African nations maintain a close relationship with North Korea, despite United Nations sanctions on North Korea.

== History ==
=== Cold War and the decolonization of Africa ===
During the Cold War, North Korea joined the Third World and the Eastern Bloc (especially China, Cuba, and the Soviet Union) in condemning colonialism in Africa and providing support to revolutionary and anti-colonial movements across the continent. They provided several military and civil assistance programs to some of Africa's more radical states, including Guinea, Ethiopia, Zimbabwe, Mali, and Tanzania. In return, North Korea was able to gain diplomatic recognition and other leverage; they were successful in ensuring South Korea was unable to join the Non-Aligned Movement. In Egypt's case, the relationship was especially close; North Korean pilots flew Egyptian fighters in the 1973 Yom Kippur War and Egypt exported to North Korea scud missiles. Egypt even had diplomatic relations established with Israel before it had relations with South Korea.

=== Rhodesian Bush War ===
During the Rhodesian Bush War, North Korea opposed the white-ruled government of Rhodesia (now Zimbabwe) and supported the black African guerrilla fighters, alongside the Soviet Union. Soldiers of the Zimbabwe African National Union were invited to a hidden camp near Pyongyang, where North Korean military officers trained them with explosives. After Rhodesia became Zimbabwe in 1980, North Korea maintained an alliance with Zimbabwean president Robert Mugabe.

=== Apartheid in South Africa ===
North Korea strongly condemned apartheid in South Africa and refused to establish any diplomatic relations with the apartheid regime. When North Korea opened up for foreign tourists in 1986, it banned citizens of South Africa from entry (along with citizens of Japan, the United States, and Israel). Militants affiliated with the African National Congress received training from North Korean agents in camps hidden inside Angola. Diplomatic relations between the two nations were established in 1998, after the end of apartheid. After the death of Nelson Mandela in 2013, Chairman of the Presidium of the Supreme People's Assembly Kim Yong-nam expressed condolences on behalf of Supreme Leader Kim Jong Un, and praised Mandela's "struggle against racism and for democracy".

=== Angolan Civil War ===
North Korea has had a strong relationship with Angola from the time of Angola's struggle for independence. It is estimated that 3,000 North Korean troops and a thousand advisers took part in the Angolan Civil War in the 1970s and 1980s, supporting the communist MPLA and fighting against the apartheid South African military.

=== Chadian Civil War ===
Ibrahim Abatcha and his revolutionary movement, a synthesis between Socialism and Islamism, which in 1966 he ended up organizing in Sudan as FROLINAT, had close ties with Pyongyang and had North Korean help for its establishment. In Cairo, Abatcha formed a close relationship with other non-Arab Chadian revolutionaries to create a clandestine administrative committee composed of six like-minded revolutionaries. With the help of Cameroonian Marxists, Abatcha and a handful of faithful left Cairo in June 1965 to train in North Korea. They returned to Egypt four months later, just days before the tax revolt in eastern Chad broke out in Mangalmé. Due to his relations with the North Korean government, Abatcha and his companions were known as "the Koreans".

=== Mozambican Civil War ===
After Mozambique gained its independence from Portugal in a revolution, it fell into a civil war between the communist FRELIMO and the anti-communist RENAMO. North Korea established a military mission in Mozambique during the early 1980s to support FRELIMO. North Korean advisers were instrumental in the formation of FRELIMO's first specialized counter-insurgency brigade, which was deployed from 1983 onward. Furthermore, the GDR has provided military assistance and training to members of the Mozambican FPLM in the GDR.

=== Zanzibar Revolution ===
After the black African rebels overthrew the ruling Arab monarchy of Zanzibar, North Korea received immediate recognition from the People's Republic of Zanzibar and Pemba.

=== South African Border War ===
During the South African Border War, SWAPO formed The South West African Liberation Army – an insurgency against the South African government. SWLA rebels traveled to North Korea for military training.

== Military ==
=== Gambia ===
North Korea dispatched a team of karate martial arts instructors to provide the military of the Gambia with self-defence training.

=== Nigeria ===
North Korea offered ballistic missile assistance to Nigeria after a meeting with Nigerian vice president Atiku Abubakar and Yang Hyong-sop, the Chairman of the Supreme People's Assembly of North Korea.

=== Uganda ===
Uganda is a long-term ally of North Korea. Yoweri Museveni, Uganda's president since 1986, has said that he learned basic Korean from Kim Il Sung during visits to North Korea. North Korea has provided training for pilots, technicians, police, marine forces, and special forces. In 2016 Uganda stated that it was ending this cooperation due to United Nations sanctions against North Korea's nuclear weapons program. Uganda indicated, however, that it still considered North Korea to be a friend.

=== Zimbabwe ===
Soldiers of the Zimbabwean African National Liberation Army were trained in North Korea during the Rhodesian Bush War. In 1980, after independence was gained and Rhodesia became Zimbabwe, the new Zimbabwean President Robert Mugabe visited North Korea. In October 1980, Kim Il Sung and Mugabe signed an agreement for an exchange of soldiers. Following this agreement, 106 North Korean soldiers arrived in Zimbabwe to train a brigade of soldiers that became known as the Fifth Brigade.

== Trade ==
Trade between North Korea and African nations is estimated to be worth US$100 million. This is a significant amount of money for North Korea due to foreign sanctions. North Korean deployed a team in 1978 and 1979, to help start up Asian carp-based aquaculture in Rwanda. Japanese prime minister Shinzo Abe has called for pressure on African nations to reduce their trade with North Korea.

== Art and culture ==
As part of their efforts to attain widespread diplomatic recognition, the North Korean government established the Mansudae Overseas Projects as a subsidiary of its Mansudae Art Studio. From its inception to the modern day, Mansudae Overseas has created monuments, sculptures, and government facilities in the style of socialist realism. Although many of its initial works were given freely as diplomatic gestures, especially in Africa, Mansudae Overseas began charging for its construction following the dissolution of the Soviet Union and the subsequent end of Soviet financial assistance. Due in part to this history of artistic diplomacy, African nations continue to represent most of Mansudae Overseas' customers. Mansudae Overseas Projects built the African Renaissance Monument in Senegal, which is the tallest statue in Africa. In Mozambique, a street named after Kim il-Sung can be found in the capital Maputo. In Namibia's national museum, a black-and-white picture of a North Korean soldier leading a group of local soldiers hangs in the foyer.

== North Korea's foreign relations with African countries ==
- Algeria–North Korea relations
- Angola–North Korea relations
- Benin–North Korea relations
- Botswana–North Korea relations
- Burkina Faso–North Korea relations
- Burundi–North Korea relations
- Cameroon–North Korea relations
- Cape Verde–North Korea relations
- Central African Republic–North Korea relations
- Chad–North Korea relations
- Comoros–North Korea relations
- Democratic Republic of the Congo–North Korea relations
- Republic of the Congo–North Korea relations
- Djibouti–North Korea relations
- Egypt–North Korea relations
- Equatorial Guinea–North Korea relations
- Eritrea–North Korea relations
- Eswatini–North Korea relations
- Ethiopia–North Korea relations
- Gabon–North Korea relations
- (The Gambia) Gambia–North Korea relations
- Ghana–North Korea relations
- Guinea–North Korea relations
- Guinea-Bissau–North Korea relations
- Ivory Coast–North Korea relations
- Kenya–North Korea relations
- Lesotho–North Korea relations
- Liberia–North Korea relations
- Libya–North Korea relations
- Madagascar–North Korea relations
- Malawi–North Korea relations
- Mali–North Korea relations
- Mauritania–North Korea relations
- Mauritius–North Korea relations
- Morocco–North Korea relations
- Mozambique–North Korea relations
- Namibia–North Korea relations
- Niger–North Korea relations
- Nigeria–North Korea relations
- North Korea–Rwanda relations
- North Korea–São Tomé and Príncipe relations
- North Korea–Senegal relations
- North Korea–Seychelles relations
- North Korea–Sierra Leone relations
- North Korea–Somalia relations
- North Korea–South Africa relations
- North Korea–South Sudan relations
- North Korea–Sudan relations
- North Korea–Tanzania relations
- North Korea–Togo relations
- North Korea–Tunisia relations
- North Korea–Uganda relations
- North Korea–Zambia relations
- North Korea–Zimbabwe relations

== See also ==
- Foreign relations of North Korea
- Africa–South Korea relations

== Sources ==
- Sheriff, Abdul; Ferguson, Ed (1991). Zanzibar Under Colonial Rule. James Currey Publishers. ISBN 978-0-85255-080-9.
- Wessels, Hannes (July 2010). P. K. van der Byl: African Statesman. Johannesburg: 30° South Publishers. ISBN 978-1-920143-49-7.
