= Foreign relations of North Korea =

North Korea has diplomatic relations with 160 states. In the past, the country's foreign relations were marked by its conflict with South Korea and its historical ties to the Soviet Union. Both the government of North Korea and the government of South Korea claim to be the sole legitimate government of the whole of Korea. The de facto end of the Korean War left North Korea in a military confrontation with South Korea along the Korean Demilitarized Zone.

At the start of the Cold War, North Korea had diplomatic recognition only by communist countries. Over the following decades, it established relations with developing countries and joined the Non-Aligned Movement. When the Eastern Bloc collapsed in the years 1989–1992, North Korea made efforts to improve its diplomatic relations with developed capitalist countries. At the same time, there were international efforts to resolve the confrontation on the Korean peninsula. At the same time, North Korea acquired nuclear weapons, adding to the concerns of the international community.

== Principles and practice ==
The Constitution of North Korea establishes the country's foreign policy. While Article 2 of the constitution describes the country as a "revolutionary state", maintain state sovereignty and political independence.

Many articles specifically outline the country's foreign policy. Article 15 says that the country will "protect the democratic national rights of Korean compatriots overseas and their legitimate rights and interests as recognized by international law" and Article 17 explicates the basic ideals of the country's foreign policy:

- Basic ideals of their foreign policy are "independence, peace and friendship"
- Establishment of political, economic, cultural, and diplomatic relations with "friendly countries" on the principles of "complete equality, independence, mutual respect, non-interference in each other's affairs and mutual benefit."
- Unifying with "peoples of the world who defend their independence"
- Actively supporting and encouraging "struggle of all people who oppose all forms of aggression and interference and fight for their countries' independence and national and class emancipation."

Other parts of the constitution explicate other foreign policies. Article 36 says that foreign trade by the DPRK will be conducted "by state organs, enterprises, and social, cooperative organizations" while the country will "develop foreign trade on the principles of complete equality and mutual benefit." Article 37 adds that the country will encourage "institutions, enterprises and organizations in the country to conduct equity or contractual joint ventures with foreign corporations and individuals, and to establish and operate enterprises of various kinds in special economic zones." Furthermore, Article 38 says that the DPRK will implement a protectionist tariff policy "to protect the independent national economy" while Article 59 says the country's armed forces will "carry out the military-first revolutionary line." In terms of other foreign policy, Article 80 says that the country will grant asylum to foreign nationals who have been persecuted "for struggling for peace and democracy, national independence and socialism or for the freedom of scientific and cultural pursuits."

Ultimately, however, as explicated in Articles 100–103 and 109, the chairman of the National Defense Commission (NDC) is the supreme leader of the country, with a term that is the same as members of the Supreme People's Assembly or SPA (five years), as is established in article 90, directing the country's armed forces, and guiding overall state affairs, but is not determined by him alone since he is still accountable to the SPA. Rather, the NDC chairman works to defend the state from external actors. Currently, Kim Jong Un is the leader of the Workers' Party of Korea (WPK), head of state, and supreme commander. The Constitution also delineates, in article 117, that the Chairman of the Standing Committee of the Supreme People's Assembly, which can convene the SPA, receives "credentials and letters of recall from envoys accredited by other countries." Additionally, the cabinet of the DPRK has the authority to "conclude treaties with foreign countries and conduct external affairs" as noted in Article 125.

North Korea is one of the few countries in which the giving of presents still plays a significant role in diplomatic protocol, with Korean Central News Agency (KCNA) reporting from time to time the country's leader received a floral basket or other gift from a foreign leader or organization. During a 2000 visit to Pyongyang, US Secretary of State Madeleine Albright gave North Korean leader Kim Jong Il a basketball signed by Michael Jordan, as he took an interest in NBA basketball. During the 2000 inter-Korean summit, Kim Jong Il made a gift of two Pungsan dogs (associated with the North) to South Korean president Kim Dae-jung. In return, Kim Dae-jung gave two Jindo dogs (associated with the South) to Kim Jong Il. At their Pyongyang summit in 2018, North Korean leader Kim Jong Un gave two Pungsan dogs to South Korean President, Moon Jae-in.

North Korea takes its defense seriously, confronting countries they see as threatening their sovereignty, and restricts the activities of foreign diplomats.

== History ==
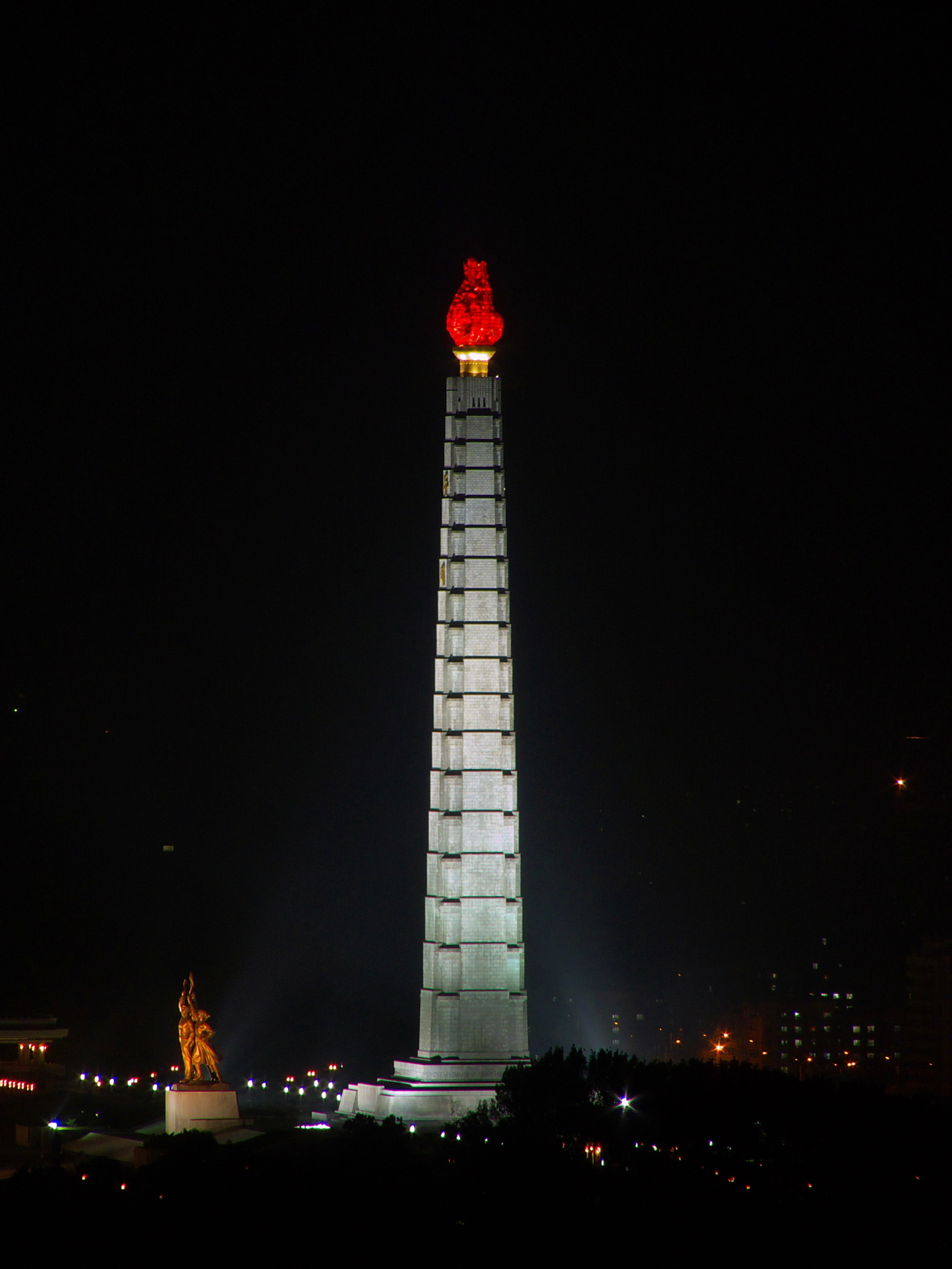
Juche Tower, Pyongyang

After 1945, the USSR supplied the economic and military aid that enabled North Korea to mount its invasion of South Korea in 1950. Soviet aid and influence continued at a high level during the Korean War. This was only the beginning of North Korea as governed by the faction which had its roots in an anti-Japanese Korean nationalist movement based in Manchuria and China, with Kim Il Sung participating in this movement and later forming the Workers' Party of Korea (WPK).

The assistance of Chinese troops, after 1950, during the war and their presence in the country until 1958 gave China some degree of influence in North Korea.

In 1961, North Korea concluded formal mutual security treaties with the Soviet Union and China, which have not been formally ended. In the case of China, Kim Il Sung and Zhou Enlai signed the Sino-North Korean Mutual Aid and Cooperation Friendship Treaty, whereby Communist China pledged to immediately render military and other assistance by all means to its ally against any outside attack. The treaty says, in short that:

The Chairman of the People's Republic of China and the Presidium of the Supreme People's Assembly of the Democratic People's Republic of Korea, determined, in accordance with Marxism–Leninism and the principle of proletarian internationalism and on the basis of mutual respect for state sovereignty and territorial integrity, mutual non-aggression, non-interference in each other's internal affairs, equality and mutual benefit, and mutual assistance and support, to make every effort to further strengthen and develop the fraternal relations of friendship, co-operation and mutual assistance between the People's Republic of China and the Democratic People's Republic of Korea, to jointly guard the security of the two peoples, and to safeguard and consolidate the peace of Asia and the world ... [Article II:]The Contracting Parties will continue to make every effort to safeguard the peace of Asia and the world and the security of all peoples ... [Article II:] In the event of one of the Contracting Parties being subjected to the armed attack by any state or several states jointly and thus being involved in a state of war, the other Contracting Party shall immediately render military and other assistance by all means at its disposal ... [Article V:] The Contracting Parties, on the principles of mutual respect for sovereignty, non-interference in each other's internal affairs, equality and mutual benefit and in the spirit of friendly co-operation, will continue to render each other every possible economic and technical aid in the cause of socialist construction of the two countries and will continue to consolidate and develop economic, cultural, and scientific and technical co-operation between the two countries ... [Article VI:] The Contracting Parties hold that the unification of Korea must be realized along peaceful and democratic lines and that such a solution accords exactly with the national interests of the Korean people and the aim of preserving peace in the Far East.

For most of the Cold War, North Korea avoided taking sides in the Sino-Soviet split. It was originally only recognized by countries in the Communist Bloc until 1962 when, upon becoming independent, Algeria recognized it. The provisional government set up by Algerian independence fighters had made a resolution to recognize North Korea.

East Germany was an important source of economic cooperation for North Korea. The East German leader, Erich Honecker, who visited in 1977, was one of Kim Il Sung's closest foreign friends. In 1986, the two countries signed an agreement on military co-operation. Kim was also close to maverick Communist leaders, Josip Broz Tito of Yugoslavia, and Nicolae Ceaușescu of Romania. North Korea began to play a part in the global radical movement, forging ties with such diverse groups as the Black Panther Party of the US, the Workers' Party of Ireland, and the African National Congress. As it increasingly emphasized its independence, North Korea began to promote the doctrine of Juche ("self-reliance") as an alternative to orthodox Marxism-Leninism and as a model for developing countries to follow.

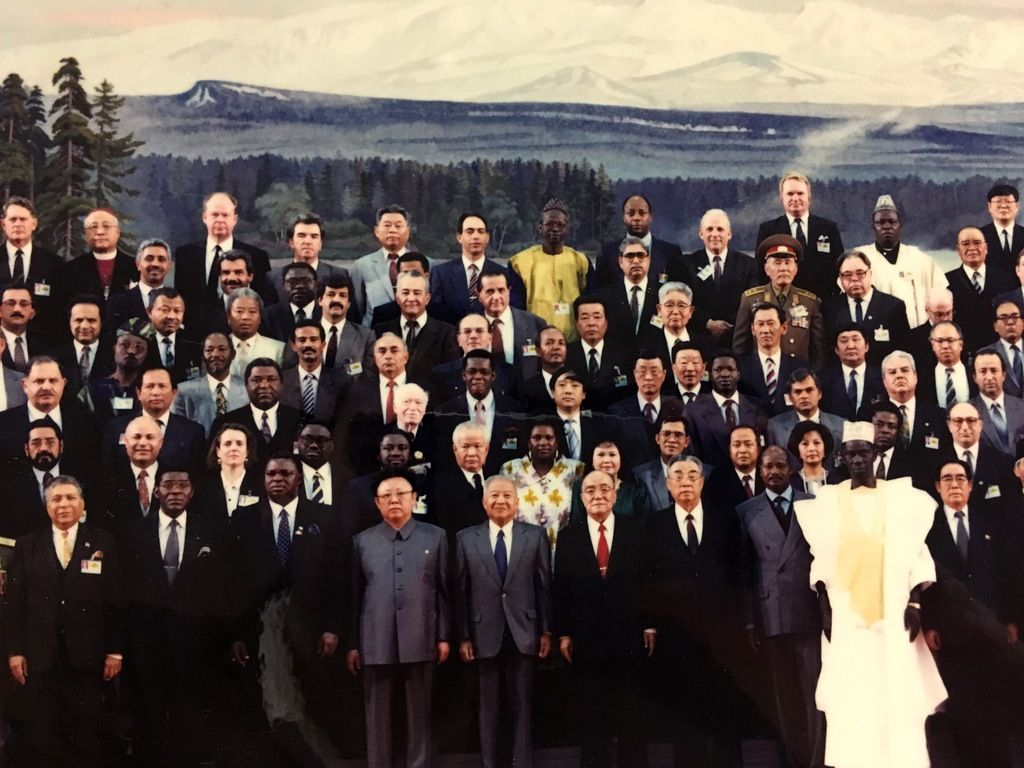
Kim Il-sung's 80th birthday ceremony with international guests, in 1992.

When North-South dialogue started in 1972, North Korea began to receive diplomatic recognition from countries outside the Communist bloc. Within four years, North Korea was recognized by 93 countries, on par with South Korea's 96. North Korea gained entry into the World Health Organization and, as a result, sent its first permanent observer missions to the United Nations (UN). In 1975, it joined the Non-Aligned Movement.

Libyan Leader Muammar Gaddafi met with Kim Il Sung and was a close ally of the DPRK.

In 1983, North Korea carried out the Rangoon bombing, a failed assassination attempt against South Korean dictator Chun Doo-hwan while he was visiting Burma. This attack on neutral soil led many Third World countries to reconsider their ties with North Korea. During the 1980s, the pace of North Korea's establishment of new diplomatic relations slowed considerably. Following Kim Il Sung's 1984 visit to Moscow, there was a dramatic improvement in Soviet-DPRK relations, resulting in renewed deliveries of advanced Soviet weaponry to North Korea and increases in economic aid. In 1989, as a response to the 1988 Seoul Olympics, North Korea hosted the 13th World Festival of Youth and Students in Pyongyang.

South Korea established diplomatic relations with the Soviet Union in 1990 and the People's Republic of China in 1992, which put a serious strain on relations between North Korea and its traditional allies. Moreover, the demise of Communist states in Eastern Europe in 1989 and the disintegration of the Soviet Union in 1991 had resulted in a significant drop in communist aid to North Korea, resulting in largely decreased relations with Russia. Subsequently, South Korea developed the "sunshine policy" towards North Korea, aiming for peaceful Korean reunification. This policy ended in 2009.

In September 1991, North Korea became a member of the UN. In July 2000, it began participating in the ASEAN Regional Forum (ARF), as Foreign Minister Paek Nam-sun attended the ARF ministerial meeting in Bangkok July 26–27. North Korea also expanded its bilateral diplomatic ties in that year, establishing diplomatic relations with Italy, Australia and the Philippines. The United Kingdom established diplomatic relations with North Korea on December 13, 2000, as did Canada in February 2001, followed by Germany and New Zealand on March 1, 2001.

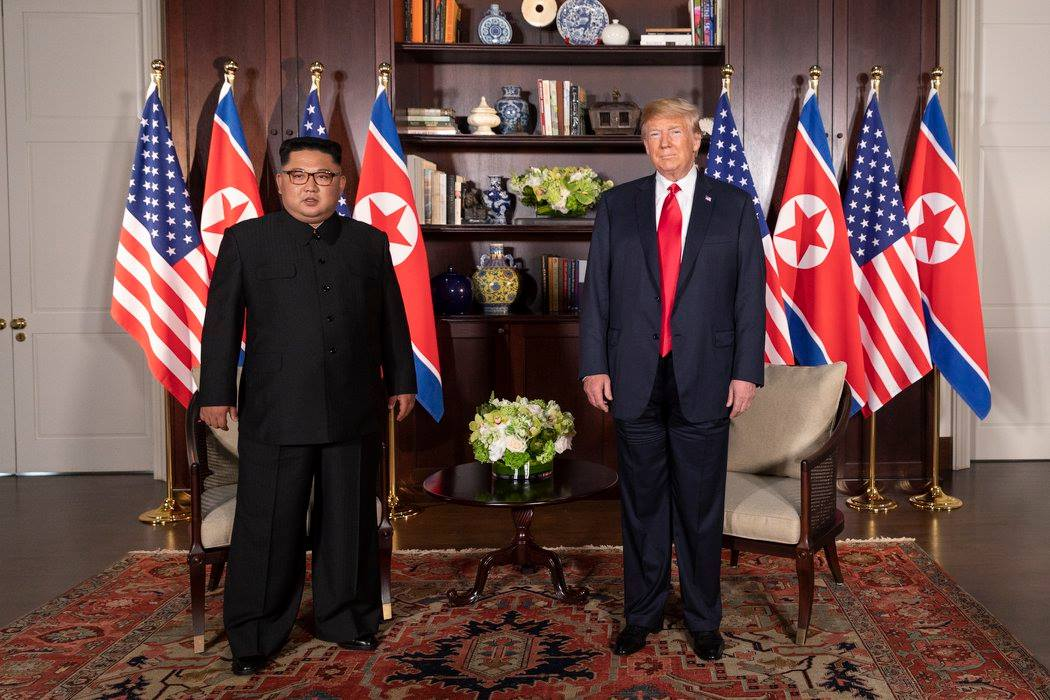
The historic Trump–Kim summit in June 2018

In 2006, North Korea test-fired a series of ballistic missiles, after Chinese officials had advised North Korean authorities not to do so. As a result, Chinese authorities publicly rebuked what the west perceives as China's closest ally, and supported the UN Security Council Resolution 1718, which imposed sanctions on North Korea. At other times however, China has blocked United Nations resolutions threatening sanctions against North Korea. In January 2009, China's paramount leader Hu Jintao and North Korea's supreme leader Kim Jong Il exchanged greetings and declared 2009 as the "year of China-DPRK friendship", marking 60 years of diplomatic relations between the two countries.

On November 28, 2010, as part of the United States diplomatic cables leak, WikiLeaks and media partners such as The Guardian published details of communications in which Chinese officials referred to North Korea as a "spoiled child" and its nuclear program as "a threat to the whole world's security" while two anonymous Chinese officials claimed there was growing support in Beijing for Korean reunification under the South's government.

In 2017, North Korea tested the Hwasong-15, an intercontinental ballistic missile capable of striking anywhere in the US. Estimates of North Korea's nuclear arsenal at that time ranged between 15 and 60 bombs, probably including hydrogen bombs.

In February 2018, North Korea sent a high-level delegation to the Winter Olympics in South Korea. Subsequently, Kim Jong Un met with President Moon Jae-in of South Korea and US President Donald Trump to discuss peace.

== Inter-Korean relations ==
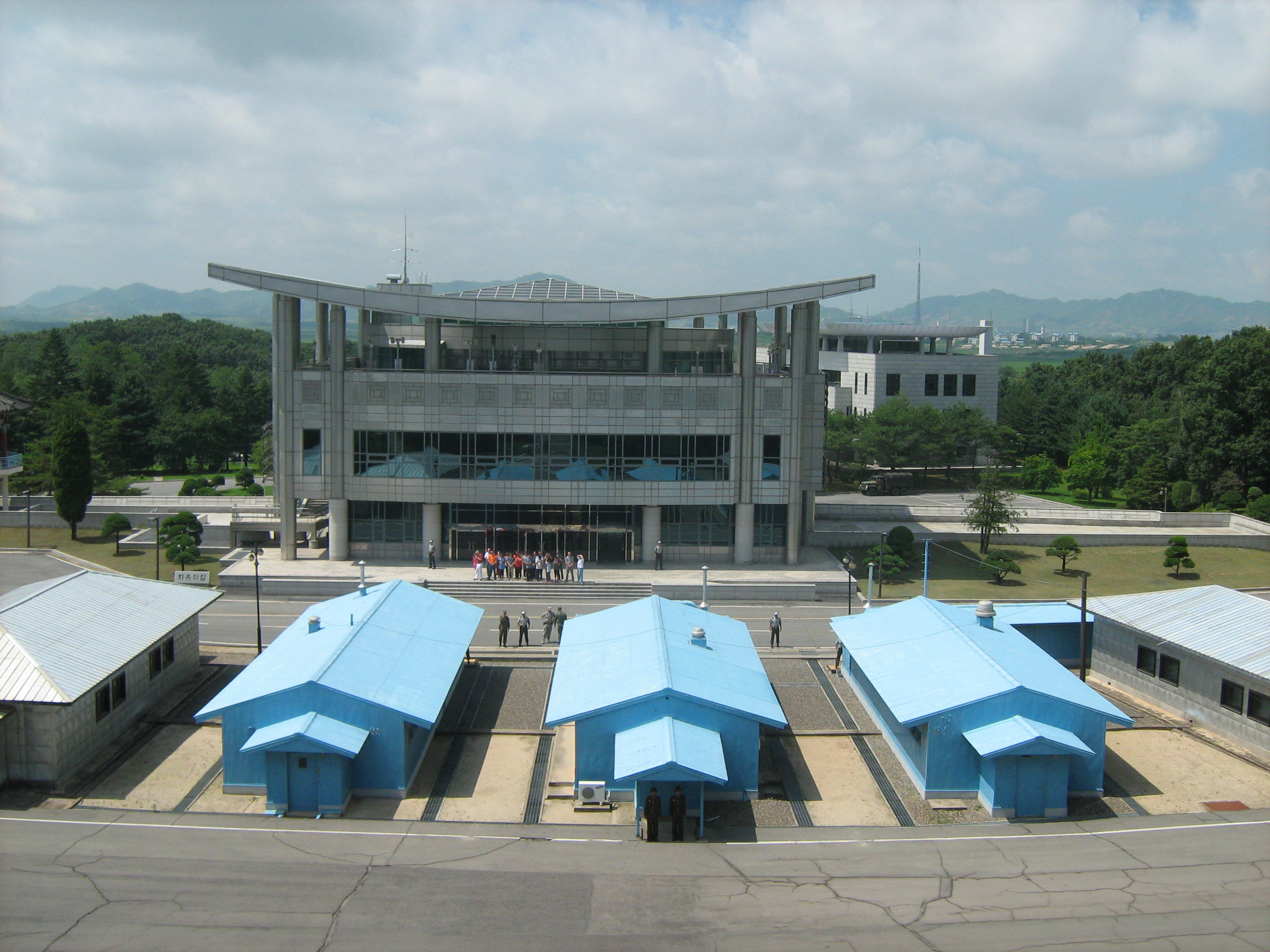
The Korean DMZ, viewed from the north

In August 1971, both North and South Korea agreed to hold talks through their respective Red Cross societies with the aim of reuniting the many Korean families separated following the division of Korea after the Korean War. After a series of secret meetings, both sides announced on July 4, 1972, an agreement to work toward peaceful reunification and an end to the hostile atmosphere prevailing on the peninsula. Dialogue was renewed on several fronts in September 1984, when South Korea accepted the North's offer to provide relief goods to victims of severe flooding in South Korea.

In a major initiative in July 1988, South Korean President Roh Tae-woo called for new efforts to promote north–south exchanges, family reunification, inter-Korean trade and contact in international forums. Roh followed up this initiative in a UN General Assembly speech in which South Korea offered to discuss security matters with the North for the first time. In September 1990, the first of eight prime minister-level meetings between officials of North Korea and South Korea took place in Seoul, beginning an especially fruitful period of dialogue. The prime ministerial talks resulted in two major agreements: the Agreement on Reconciliation, Nonaggression, Exchanges, and Cooperation (the Basic Agreement) and the Declaration on the Denuclearization of the Korean Peninsula (the Joint Declaration). The Joint Declaration on denuclearization was initiated on December 13, 1991. It forbade both sides to test, manufacture, produce, receive, possess, store, deploy, or use nuclear weapons and forbade the possession of nuclear reprocessing and uranium enrichment facilities. On January 30, 1992, North Korea also signed a nuclear safeguards agreement with the IAEA, as it had pledged to do in 1985 when acceding to the nuclear Non-Proliferation Treaty. This safeguards agreement allowed IAEA inspections to begin in June 1992.

As the 1990s progressed, concern over the North's nuclear program became a major issue in north–south relations and between North Korea and the US. By 1998, South Korean President Kim Dae-jung announced a Sunshine Policy towards North Korea. This led in June 2000 to the first Inter-Korean summit, between Kim Dae-jung and Kim Jong Il. In September 2000, the North and South Korean teams marched together at the Sydney Olympics. Trade increased to the point where South Korea became North Korea's largest trading partner. Starting in 1998, the Mount Kumgang Tourist Region was developed as a joint venture between the government of North Korea and Hyundai. In 2003, the Kaesong Industrial Region was established to allow South Korean businesses to invest in the North.

In 2007, South Korean President Roh Moo-hyun held talks with Kim Jong Il in Pyongyang. On October 4, 2007, South Korean President Roh and Kim signed a peace declaration. The document called for international talks to replace the Armistice which ended the Korean War with a permanent peace treaty. The Sunshine Policy was formally abandoned by subsequent South Korean President Lee Myung-bak in 2010.

The Kaesong Industrial Park was closed in 2013, amid tensions about North Korea's nuclear weapons program. It reopened the same year but closed again in 2016.

In 2017 Moon Jae-in was elected President of South Korea with promises to return to the Sunshine Policy. In his New Year address for 2018, North Korean leader Kim Jong Un proposed sending a delegation to the upcoming Winter Olympics in South Korea. The Seoul–Pyongyang hotline was reopened after almost two years. North and South Korea marched together in the Olympics opening ceremony and fielded a united women's ice hockey team. North Korea sent an unprecedented high-level delegation, headed by Kim Yo-jong, sister of Kim Jong Un, and President Kim Yong-nam, as well as athletes and performers.

On April 27, the 2018 inter-Korean summit took place between President Moon Jae-in and Kim Jong Un on the South Korean side of the Joint Security Area. It was also the first time since the Korean War that a North Korean leader had entered South Korean territory. The summit ended with both countries pledging to work towards complete denuclearization of the Korean Peninsula. They agreed to work to remove all nuclear weapons from the Korean Peninsula and, within the year, to declare an official end to the Korean War. As part of the Panmunjom Declaration which was signed by leaders of both countries, both sides also called for the end of longstanding military activities in the region of the Korean border and a reunification of Korea. Also, the leaders of the region's two divided states have agreed to work together to connect and modernise their border railways.

Moon and Kim met the second time on May 26. Their second summit was unannounced, held in the North Korean portion of Joint Security Area and concerned Kim's upcoming summit with US President Donald Trump. Trump and Kim met on June 12, 2018, the first face-to-face discussion in Singapore between a leader of North Korea and a sitting President of the United States, in Singapore and endorsed the Panmunjom Declaration.

On June 30, 2019, Kim and Moon met again at the Korean DMZ, this time joined by Trump. During 2019, North Korea conducted a series of short–range missile tests, while the US and South Korea took part in joint military drills in August. On August 16, 2019, North Korea's ruling party made a statement criticizing the South for participating in the drills and for buying US military hardware, calling it a "grave provocation" and saying there would be no more negotiation.

On June 16, 2020, the joint liaison office in Kaesong was blown up by the North Korean government.

Further deterioration has also been seen in 2024, with Kim Jong Un officially "ruling out unification" with South Korea, and subsequently demolishing the Arch of Reunification in Pyongyang. The Committee for the Peaceful Reunification of the Fatherland, the National Economic Cooperation Bureau and the Mount Kumgang International Tourism Administration were also dissolved.

On June 9, 2024, South Korea resumed anti-North Korean loudspeaker broadcasts along the border, prompting North Korea to install its own loudspeakers in response. This escalation follows North Korea's balloon campaign, which included sending trash and manure into the South, and has led to heightened tensions and threats from North Korean leader Kim Jong Un's sister.

On June 11, 2025, South Korea announced the suspension of the loudspeaker broadcasts as part of a bid to "restore trust" between both countries. The move came a week after the election of South Korea's new president, Lee Jae-myung, who had campaigned on improving ties with North Korea.

== Nuclear weapons program ==
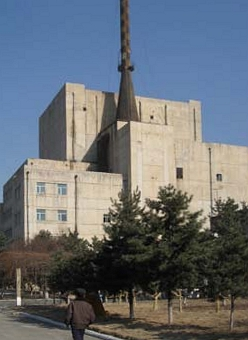
5 MWe experimental reactor at Yongbyon Nuclear Scientific Research Center

Results of the 2017 BBC World Service poll. Views of North Korean Influence by country Sorted by Pos-Neg
Country polled	Positive	Negative	Neutral	Pos-Neg
United States	5%	88%	7	−83
United Kingdom	7%	89%	4	−82
Australia	6%	87%	7	−81
France	9%	85%	6	−76
Canada	10%	81%	9	−71
Spain	5%	75%	20	−70
Greece	6%	64%	30	−58
China	19%	76%	5	−57
Germany	1%	56%	43	−55
Global average	17%	59%	24	−42
Brazil	23%	60%	17	−37
Mexico	24%	54%	22	−30
Peru	22%	51%	27	−29
Indonesia	17%	46%	37	−29
India	19%	40%	41	−21
Turkey	34%	44%	22	−10
Russia	20%	30%	50	−10
Nigeria	33%	42%	25	−9
Kenya	27%	36%	37	−9
Pakistan	20%	25%	55	−5

North Korea's nuclear research program started with Soviet help in the 1960s, on condition that it joined the Nuclear Non-Proliferation Treaty (NPT). In the 1980s an indigenous nuclear reactor development program started with a small experimental 5 MWe gas-cooled reactor in Yongbyon, with a 50 MWe and 200 MWe reactor to follow. Concerns that North Korea had non-civilian nuclear ambitions were first raised in the late 1980s and almost resulted in their withdrawal from the NPT in 1994. However, the Agreed Framework and the Korean Peninsula Energy Development Organization (KEDO) temporarily resolved this crisis by having the US and several other countries agree that in exchange for dismantling its nuclear program, two light-water reactors (LWRs) would be provided with moves toward normalization of political and economic relations. This agreement started to break down from 2001 because of slow progress on the KEDO light water reactor project and U.S. President George W. Bush's Axis of Evil speech. After continued allegations from the United States, North Korea declared the existence of uranium enrichment programs during a private meeting with American military officials. North Korea withdrew from the Nuclear Non-Proliferation Treaty on January 10, 2003. In 2006, North Korea conducted its first nuclear test.

In the third (and last) phase of the fifth round of six-party talks were held on February 8, 2007, and implementation of the agreement reached at the end of the round has been successful according to the requirements of steps to be taken by all six parties within 30 days, and within 60 days after the agreement, including normalization of US-North Korea and Japanese-North Korean diplomatic ties, but on the condition that North Korea ceases to operate its Yongbyon nuclear research centre.

North Korea conducted further nuclear tests in 2009, 2013, January and September 2016, and 2017. In 2018, North Korea ceased conducting nuclear and intercontinental ballistic missile tests. Kim Jong Un signed the Panmunjom Declaration committing to "denuclearisation of the Korean Peninsula" and affirmed the same commitment in a subsequent meeting with US President Donald Trump.

== Diplomatic relations ==
North Korea is often perceived as the "Hermit kingdom", completely isolated from the rest of the world, but North Korea maintains diplomatic relations with 164 independent states. The country also has bilateral relations with Palestine, the Sahrawi Arab Democratic Republic, and the European Union.

In October 2023, North Korea announced that it will be ending its diplomatic missions with several countries around the world. It declared to shut down dozens of embassies, including in Spain, Hong Kong, Nepal, Bangladesh, and many countries in Africa. South Korea suspected that this announcement was a sign of North Korea's struggle to earn money overseas due to international sanctions.

List of countries which North Korea maintains diplomatic relations with:

#	Country	Date
1	Russia	12 October 1948
2	Mongolia	15 October 1948
3	Poland	16 October 1948
4	Czech Republic	21 October 1948
5	Serbia	30 October 1948
6	Romania	3 November 1948
7	Hungary	11 November 1948
8	Albania	29 November 1948
9	Bulgaria	29 November 1948
10	China	6 October 1949
11	Vietnam	31 January 1950
12	Algeria	25 September 1958
13	Guinea	8 October 1958
14	Cuba	29 August 1960
15	Mali	29 August 1961
16	Yemen	9 March 1963
17	Egypt	24 August 1963
18	Indonesia	16 April 1964
19	Mauritania	12 November 1964
20	Republic of the Congo	24 December 1964
21	Cambodia	28 December 1964
22	Ghana	28 December 1964
23	Tanzania	13 January 1965
24	Syria	25 July 1966
25	Burundi	12 March 1967
26	Somalia	13 April 1967
—	Iraq (suspended)	30 January 1968
27	Equatorial Guinea	30 January 1969
28	Zambia	12 April 1969
29	Chad	8 March 1969
30	Sudan	21 June 1969
31	Central African Republic	5 September 1969
32	Maldives	14 June 1970
33	Sri Lanka	15 July 1970
34	Sierra Leone	14 October 1971
35	Malta	20 December 1971
36	Cameroon	3 March 1972
37	Rwanda	22 April 1972
38	Chile	1 June 1972
39	Uganda	2 August 1972
40	Senegal	8 September 1972
41	Burkina Faso	11 October 1972
42	Pakistan	9 November 1972
43	Madagascar	16 November 1972
44	Democratic Republic of the Congo	15 December 1972
45	Togo	31 January 1973
46	Benin	5 February 1973
47	Gambia	2 March 1973
48	Mauritius	16 March 1973
49	Sweden	7 April 1973
50	Iran	15 April 1973
—	Argentina (suspended)	1 June 1973
51	Finland	1 June 1973
—	Malaysia (suspended)	30 June 1973
52	Norway	22 June 1973
53	Denmark	17 July 1973
54	Iceland	27 July 1973
55	Bangladesh	9 December 1973
56	India	10 December 1973
57	Liberia	30 December 1973
58	Afghanistan	26 December 1973
59	Libya	22 January 1974
60	Gabon	29 January 1974
—	Costa Rica (suspended)	10 February 1974
61	Guinea-Bissau	16 March 1974
62	Nepal	15 May 1974
63	Guyana	18 May 1974
64	Laos	24 June 1974
—	Jordan (suspended)	5 July 1974
65	Niger	6 September 1974
66	Jamaica	9 October 1974
67	Venezuela	28 October 1974
68	Austria	17 December 1974
69	Switzerland	20 December 1974
—	Botswana (suspended)	27 December 1974
70	Australia	31 December 1974
71	Fiji	14 April 1975
—	Portugal (suspended)	15 April 1975
72	Thailand	8 May 1975
73	Myanmar	19 May 1975
74	Ethiopia	5 June 1975
75	Mozambique	25 June 1975
76	Tunisia	3 August 1975
77	São Tomé and Príncipe	9 August 1975
78	Cape Verde	18 August 1975
79	Singapore	8 November 1975
80	Comoros	13 November 1975
81	Angola	16 November 1975
—	Sahrawi Arab Democratic Republic	16 March 1975
82	Nigeria	25 May 1976
83	Papua New Guinea	1 June 1976
84	Seychelles	24 August 1976
85	Barbados	5 December 1977
—	Samoa (suspended)	28 June 1978
86	Grenada	9 May 1979
87	Nicaragua	21 August 1979
88	Saint Lucia	13 September 1979
89	Zimbabwe	18 April 1980
90	Lesotho	19 July 1980
91	Mexico	9 September 1980
92	Lebanon	12 February 1981
93	Vanuatu	1 October 1981
94	Nauru	25 February 1982
95	Malawi	25 June 1982
96	Suriname	11 October 1982
97	Ivory Coast	9 January 1985
98	Trinidad and Tobago	22 January 1986
99	Colombia	24 October 1988
100	Peru	15 December 1988
101	Morocco	13 February 1989
—	State of Palestine	3 March 1989
102	Namibia	22 March 1990
103	Saint Vincent and the Grenadines	16 August 1990
104	Antigua and Barbuda	27 November 1990
105	Dominica	21 January 1991
106	Bahamas	16 May 1991
107	Belize	20 June 1991
108	Lithuania	25 September 1991
109	Latvia	26 September 1991
110	Saint Kitts and Nevis	13 December 1991
111	Cyprus	23 December 1991
—	Ukraine (suspended)	9 January 1992
112	Turkmenistan	10 January 1992
113	Kyrgyzstan	21 January 1992
114	Kazakhstan	28 January 1992
115	Azerbaijan	30 January 1992
116	Moldova	30 January 1992
117	Belarus	3 February 1992
118	Tajikistan	5 February 1992
119	Uzbekistan	7 February 1992
120	Armenia	21 February 1992
121	Oman	20 May 1992
122	Slovenia	8 September 1992
123	Croatia	30 November 1992
124	Slovakia	1 January 1993
125	Qatar	11 January 1993
126	Eritrea	25 May 1993
127	Djibouti	13 June 1993
128	North Macedonia	2 November 1993
129	Georgia	3 November 1994
130	Bosnia and Herzegovina	19 January 1996
131	South Africa	10 August 1998
132	Brunei	7 January 1999
133	Italy	4 January 2000
134	Philippines (suspended)	12 July 2000
135	United Kingdom	12 December 2000
136	Netherlands	15 January 2001
137	Belgium	23 January 2001
—	Canada (suspended)	6 February 2001
138	Spain	7 February 2001
139	Germany	1 March 2001
140	Luxembourg	5 March 2001
141	Greece	8 March 2001
142	Brazil	9 March 2001
143	New Zealand	26 March 2001
144	Kuwait	4 April 2001
145	Liechtenstein	2 May 2001
146	Bahrain	23 May 2001
147	Turkey	27 June 2001
148	Timor-Leste	5 November 2002
149	Ireland	10 December 2003
150	San Marino	13 May 2004
151	Montenegro	16 July 2007
—	United Arab Emirates (suspended)	17 September 2007
152	Eswatini	20 September 2007
153	Dominican Republic	24 September 2007
154	Guatemala	26 September 2007
155	Kenya	26 September 2008
156	South Sudan	18 November 2011

=== Other relations ===
#	Country	Date
1	France	October 2011

== Bilateral relations ==
=== Africa ===
Country	Formal Relations Began	Notes
Algeria	1962 (July 3)	On September 25, 1958, the National Liberation Front of Algeria had started relations with North Korea. Upon independence on July 5, 1962, Algeria became the first non-Marxist–Leninist country to establish diplomatic relations with North Korea. Initially, relations were with the National Liberation Front since the Algerian War was still ongoing and the country had not gained its independence yet. North Korea maintains an embassy in the country.
Angola		North Korea has had a strong relationship with Angola from the time of Angola's struggle for independence. It is estimated that 3,000 North Korean troops and a thousand advisers took part in the Angolan Civil War in the 1970s and 1980s, and fighting against the apartheid South African military. In 2011, Angola purchased naval patrol boats from North Korea.
Benin		After the People's Republic of Benin was proclaimed in 1975, the government established good relations with several Communist countries, including North Korea. These good relations have continued to the present day.
Botswana		See Botswana–North Korea relations Botswana had good relations with North Korea from 1974. In years that followed, the first independent leader of Botswana, President Seretse Khama, made a state visit to Pyongyang, and several North Korean martial arts instructors were commissioned to train the Botswana Police Service in unarmed combat but did not stay long. Beyond this, North Korea used the Mansudae Overseas Projects company to build the Three Dikgosi Monument, which has been a source of controversy in the Western media, and hired medical professionals to supplement the ones in their country. However, Botswana broke off diplomatic ties in 2014, after suspending bilateral cooperation the previous year, over alleged human rights violations. In the following year, Ian Khama, the president of Botswana, declared that the country was an "opponent" and went on to claim that "the aggressive attitude of North Korea threatens peace in the region and therefore threatens world peace ... I think the North Korean leadership is living in the Stone Age."
Burkina Faso		See Burkina Faso–North Korea relations Burkina Faso and North Korea established strong relations during the Cold War, and these have been continued. Relations between Burkina Faso and North Korea have historically been relatively close. Neither country maintains an embassy in the other, although North Korea used to have an ambassador in Ouagadougou. Relations were especially close during the Cold War, with North Korea providing military equipment to the army of the Republic of Upper Volta, along with agricultural, military and technical assistance over the years. Thomas Sankara, a Marxist and revolutionary, visited Pyongyang several times, leading to a DPRK–Burkina Faso Friendship Association in place at the time. During the reign of Blaise Compaoré, the successor of Sankara, cultural and trade relations remained strong, along with North Korea completing construction, in 1998, five small water reservoirs in the country. In recent years, Burkina Faso has strayed from traditional relations with North Korea, by voting, in 2009, in favor of United Nations Security Council Resolution 1874, which imposed further economic sanctions on North Korea, saying that they voted in such a manner due to their commitment to a "nuclear weapon-free" world.
Burundi	2011	See Burundi–North Korea relations Burundi and North Korea have good relations. In 2011, Burundi purchased weapons from North Korea. In 2016, North Korea's Kim Yong-nam visited Burundi.
Central African Republic	1969	See Central African Republic–North Korea relations From 1969, North Korea maintained a close relationship with the long-time military ruler of the Central African Republic, Jean-Bédel Bokassa, even though he was anti-communist. After he proclaimed himself Emperor in 1976, Bokassa's first foreign visit was to Pyongyang, returning to the country in 1978, signing a treaty of peace and friendship with Kim Il Sung. Even after Bokassa was overthrown in 1979, friendly relations continued. By March 1986 it was estimated that North Korea was supplying 13 technicians to the Central African Republic, seemingly to counter South Korean influence in the country.
Comoros	1975 (November 13)	See Comoros–North Korea relations North Korea has had diplomatic relations with the Comoros since November 13, 1975.
Democratic Republic of the Congo		The Democratic Republic of the Congo has friendly relations with North Korea. After the death of Laurent Kabila, North Korean workers under the Mansudae Overseas Projects constructed a statue commemorating the life of the former leader in Kinshasa. When a North Korean delegation visited DR Congo in 2013, the two countries signed a protocol on negotiations and cooperation between their foreign ministries. In 2016, it was revealed that the Congolese government of Joseph Kabila had purchased pistols and hired military instructors from North Korea.
Egypt	1963	See Egypt–North Korea relations North Korea and Egypt have a long history of good relations. Egypt recognized North Korea in 1963. It did not recognize South Korea until 1995. North Korea gave Egypt military aid during the 1973 Yom Kippur War. In the 1980s, Egyptian President Hosni Mubarak visited North Korea four times. Egyptian company Orascom helped create North Korea's cell phone network. As of September 12, 2017, Egypt announced it was suspending military ties with North Korea.
Equatorial Guinea	1969	See Equatorial Guinea–North Korea relations Equatorial Guinea's first leader, Francisco Macías Nguema, established close ties with North Korea in 1969. The relationship continued after his overthrow. In 2016, Kim Yong-nam of North Korea visited Equatorial Guinea and held amicable talks with President Teodoro Obiang. North Korean companies publicly operated in Equatorial Guinea until 2017, when the host government said all workers has been "asked to leave" to comply with U.N. Sanctions. However, it is possible that workers remain present in a covert manner.
Ethiopia		Ethiopia has had diplomatic relations with North Korea since the 1970s. North Korea has provided training for Ethiopian militias and special forces, and supplied munitions, tanks, Armoured Personnel Carriers, and artillery. It has also helped establish two arms factories. However, economic relations have become restricted by United Nations sanctions.
Gambia	1973	See Gambia–North Korea relations The Gambia and North Korea have had relations since 1973, with a diplomatic mission of North Korea opening in 1975. In later years, North Korea sent karate instructors to the country, and had varying strong bilateral relations between the two countries. Hong Son Phy is currently the accredited ambassador to Banjul.
Ghana	1964	See Ghana–North Korea relations Ghana and North Korea established diplomatic relations in 1964. Even before diplomatic relations were established, Ghana had campaigned, along with other African nations, for recognition of North Korea as an observer in the UN. Trade relations between the two countries preceded diplomatic relations. Kim Il Sung shared much in common politically with Ghana's Kwame Nkrumah. After Nkrumah was ousted, North Korea ended up in a diplomatic spat with Ghana, which accused it of training anti-government rebels. By the late-1960s, North Korea was again supporting Ghana as an anti-imperialist force in Africa. In the 1980s, Ghana's Provisional National Defence Council successfully sought aid from North Korea and other socialist countries in order to be more independent from Western powers. An agreement on cultural exchange was signed for 1993–1995. There was a North Korean embassy in Ghana until it was closed down in 1998. The current North Korean ambassador to Ghana is Kil Mun-yong. Trade between the two countries consists mainly of North Korean exports of cement and Ghanaian cocoa, gemstones, and pearls. There is a Korea–Ghana Friendship Association for cultural exchange.
Guinea-Bissau		See Guinea-Bissau–North Korea relations
Kenya		See Kenya–North Korea relations
Libya		See Libya–North Korea relations In the 1970s and 1980s, the Libyan government led by Libyan leader Muammar Gaddafi established close ties with the North Korean government and purchased a significant amount of North Korea's weaponry. In 2015, it was estimated that 300 to 400 North Korean citizens were living in Libya.
Madagascar		North Korea has been an ally of Madagascar since the 1970s. North Korea provided assistance in construction projects, such as building the Iavoloha Palace. In 1976, Madagascar hosted a conference on the Juche concept, an established part of North Korea's foreign policy.
Mauritania	1964	See Mauritania–North Korea relations North Korea and Mauritania established relations in 1964. President Moktar Ould Daddah visited Pyongyang in 1967, while Kim Il Sung went to Mauritania in 1975. Relations soured shortly afterwards when North Korea recognised the Sahrawi Arab Democratic Republic. In 2017, a North Korean delegation visited Mauritania, and the two governments pledged to increase co-operation.
Mozambique		Mozambique has a history of good relations with North Korea. Its capital Maputo has a street called Avenida Kim Il Sung after the founder of North Korea. In 2016 a delegation of the Mozambique Liberation Front visited Pyongyang and met with members of the Workers' Party of Korea.
Namibia		See Namibia–North Korea relations Namibia's ruling party, the South West African People's Organisation (SWAPO) has had a longstanding historical relationship with North Korea, dating back to the South African Border War. Beginning in 1964, North Korea provided training and arms to SWAPO's armed wing, the People's Liberation Army of Namibia (PLAN), which was engaged in an insurgency against the South African government. Following Namibian independence, North Korea established an embassy in Windhoek; however, the current status of the embassy remains unclear. Kim Yong-nam, Chairman of the Presidium of the Supreme People's Assembly, visited Namibia in 2008, and several bilateral agreements have been signed. North Korea has helped build state houses in the regions within the country, and military co-operation continues even with sanctions on North Korea.
Nigeria	1976	See Nigeria-North Korea relations Nigeria and North Korea established diplomatic relations in 1976. In 2014, they signed an agreement to facilitate the exchange of information about technology, including exchanges and joint projects between universities. North Korea also proposed that Nigeria become a permanent member of the UN Security Council.
Rwanda		See North Korea–Rwanda relations
Senegal	1972	Senegal and North Korea have had diplomatic relations since 1972. The African Renaissance Monument in Dakar, Senegal, was built by Mansudae Overseas Projects, a company from North Korea.
Seychelles		During the 1977–2004 rule of President France-Albert René, the socialist and non-aligned government of Seychelles maintained close relations with North Korea, receiving significant North Korean developmental aid.
Somalia	1967 (April 13)	See North Korea–Somalia relations Diplomatic relations between North Korea and Somalia were formally established on April 13, 1967. This late-1950s to 1960s period was when North Korea had first declared autonomous diplomacy. However, to this day North Korea favours Ethiopia rather than Somalia during the Ethio-Somali conflict.
South Africa		See North Korea–South Africa relations North Korea supported the African National Congress in its struggle against apartheid in South Africa. North Korea campaigned against the white minority government and provided military training to ANC fighters in camps in Angola. In 1998, after the end of apartheid, North Korea and South Africa established diplomatic relations. A North Korean embassy was established in Pretoria. The two governments continue to have friendly relations.
South Sudan		North Korea and South Sudan established diplomatic relations in November 2011, shortly after South Sudan gained independence from Sudan.
Tanzania		See North Korea–Tanzania relations Tanzania and North Korea have a long history of military cooperation, going back to their mutual support for anti-imperialist struggle in southern Africa during the Cold War. In 2016, there were 11 North Korean medical clinics operating in Tanzania, two others having recently been shut down by the government. In 2017, it was reported that Tanzania was planning to open a general hospital employing dozens of North Korean doctors.
Togo		See North Korea–Togo relations
Uganda		Uganda is a long-term ally of North Korea. Yoweri Museveni, Uganda's president since 1986, has said that he learned basic Korean from Kim Il Sung during visits to North Korea. North Korea has provided training for pilots, technicians, police, marine forces, and special forces. In 2016 Uganda stated that it was ending this co-operation due to United Nations sanctions against North Korea's nuclear weapons program. Uganda indicated, however, that it still considered North Korea to be a friend. Following the imposition of strict Sanctions against North Korea in 2017, Uganda claimed to have cut all of its relations with the country. However, this was later proven to be false given the presence of North Koreans in Uganda. This was seen as evidence of the personal fondness Ugandan President Yoweri Museveni has of North Korea.
Zimbabwe		The relationship between North Korea and Zimbabwe goes back to the struggle for independence. Soldiers of Robert Mugabe's Zimbabwean African National Liberation Army were trained in North Korea in the 1970s. In 1980, after independence was gained, the new Zimbabwean President Robert Mugabe visited North Korea. In October 1980, Kim Il Sung and Mugabe signed an agreement for an exchange of soldiers. Following this agreement, 106 North Korean soldiers arrived in Zimbabwe to train a brigade of soldiers that became known as the Fifth Brigade. Zimbabwe's governing party, the ZANU-PF, mourned the death of North Korean leader Kim Jong Il in 2011. In 2013, the two countries signed an agreement, exchanging Zimbabwean uranium for North Korean arms. In 2019, the state-owned Zimbabwe Herald said that, "Kim Il Sung lives forever in the hearts of the African people as their great saviour, true friend and benevolent mentor".

=== Americas ===
Country	Formal Relations Began	Notes
Argentina	June 1, 1973 (suspended June 14, 1977)	See Argentina–North Korea relations Diplomatic relations between Argentina and North Korea were established on June 1, 1973. North Korea had an embassy in Buenos Aires from 1973 to 1977. On June 14, 1977, Argentina suspended diplomatic relations with North Korea.
Belize	June 20, 1991	Both countries established diplomatic relations on June 20, 1991.
Brazil		See Brazil–North Korea relations Despite the Brazilian government's economic relations with North Korea, it has generally condemned controversial North Korean actions that threaten stability in East Asia, such as the 2009 North Korean nuclear test, upon which the Brazilian Ministry for Foreign Affairs stated that the Brazilian Government vehemently condemns North Korea's nuclear test and urged the country to sign the Comprehensive Test Ban Treaty and return to the six-party talks as soon as possible, and the ROKS Cheonan sinking, upon which the Brazilian Ministry of External Relations issued a statement saying the government expresses solidarity with South Korea and urged stability on the Korean peninsula.
Canada	2001 (suspended May 25, 2010)	See Canada–North Korea relations Diplomatic relations between Canada and North Korea were established in February 2001. However, there are no official embassies between the two nations. Canada is represented by the Canadian Ambassador resident in Seoul, and North Korea is represented by their position in the United Nations. On May 25, 2010, Canada suspended diplomatic relations with North Korea.
Cuba	1960	See Cuba–North Korea relations North Korea has had diplomatic relations with Cuba since 1960 and maintains an embassy in Havana. Cuba has been one of North Korea's most consistent allies. North Korea media portrays Cubans as comrades in the common cause of socialism. During the Cold War, North Korea and Cuba forged a bond of solidarity based on their militant positions opposing American power. In 1968, Raúl Castro stated their views were "completely identical on everything". Che Guevara, then a Cuban government minister, visited North Korea in 1960, and proclaimed it a model for Cuba to follow. Cuban leader Fidel Castro visited in 1986. Cuba was one of the few countries that showed solidarity with North Korea by boycotting the Seoul Olympics in 1988. In 2016, the Workers' Party of Korea and the Communist Party of Cuba met to discuss strengthening ties. After Fidel Castro's death in 2016, North Korea government declared a three-day mourning period and sent an official delegation to his funeral. Supreme Leader Kim Jong Un visited the Cuban embassy in Pyongyang to pay his respects. In 2018, the new Cuban President Miguel Díaz-Canel visited North Korea, stressing socialist solidarity and opposition to sanctions.
Grenada		See Grenada–North Korea relations
Mexico	September 4, 1980	See Mexico–North Korea relations Both nations established diplomatic relations on September 4, 1980.: Mexico is accredited to North Korea from its embassy in Seoul, South Korea.; North Korea has an embassy in Mexico City.; On September 7, 2017, Mexico expelled its North Korean ambassador as punishment for Pyongyang's nuclear tests in 2017. However, ties between the two countries have not yet been officially broken.
Nicaragua	1979	North Korea gave military assistance to the Sandinista movement in the 1970s and 1980s. Nicaragua established relations with North Korea when the Sandinistas took power in 1979. Nicaraguan president Daniel Ortega visited North Korea in 1983 and 1986. 1988 Nicaragua showed its support for North Korea by boycotting the Seoul Olympics. Close relations ceased when the Sandinistas were voted out of office in 1990. In May 2007, after Ortega had been voted back into office, diplomatic ties were restored.
Peru	1988	See North Korea–Peru relations North Korea and Peru established diplomatic relations in 1988. North Korea supplied the Peruvian government with rifles to combat the Shining Path insurgency. Even so, the Peruvian government condemned the third nuclear test by North Korea in 2013, saying "the government of Peru calls on the government of North Korea to immediately stop these types of actions." In September 2017, Peru expelled North Korean ambassadors from the country.
United States		See North Korea–United States relations Relations between the two countries developed primarily in the shadow of the Korean War, and in recent years have been largely defined by North Korea's six tests of nuclear weapons, its development of long-range missiles capable of striking targets thousands of miles away, and its ongoing threats to strike the United States and South Korea with nuclear weapons and conventional forces. Trump met with Kim in Singapore on June 12, 2018. An agreement was signed between the two countries endorsing the 2017 Panmunjom Declaration signed by North and South Korea to work towards completely denuclearizing the Korean Peninsula. Following this, they met in Hanoi on February 27–28, 2019, but failed to achieve an agreement. On June 30, 2019, Trump met with Kim along with Moon Jae-in at the Korean DMZ. Talks in Stockholm began in October between US and North Korean negotiating teams, but broke down after one day. Sweden acts as the protecting power of United States interests in North Korea for consular matters.
Venezuela	1965	The two countries have had a friendly relationship since Hugo Chávez took power. In 2015, North Korea reopened its embassy in La Mercedes, Caracas, as solidarity between Caracas and Pyongyang has strengthened. The two countries also signed a bilateral agreement to build a giant statue.

=== Asia ===
Country	Formal Relations Began	Notes
Armenia	1992	The establishment of diplomatic relations between Armenia and North Korea started in 1992 upon Armenia's independence from the USSR, but never progressed due to Armenia's protest of North Korea's numerous human rights violations, nuclear weapons program, and its harsh treatment of the North Korean populace.
Bangladesh	1971	See Bangladesh–North Korea relations Bangladesh currently operates a North Korean office through its embassy in Beijing, China. North Korea also formerly maintained an embassy in Dhaka. Relations were strained during the 1971 Bangladesh War of Independence when North Korea supported the Government of East Pakistan and the Pakistan Armed Forces.
Cambodia		See Cambodia–North Korea relations Cambodia and North Korea generally had good relations. When the Khmer Rouge was removed by a Vietnamese invasion in 1979, North Korea supported Norodom Sihanouk in an exile government, and he lived in North Korea until 1991 when he became King of Cambodia and returned to the country with a bodyguard of individuals from North Korea. North Korea has an embassy in Phnom Penh and Cambodia has an embassy in Pyongyang. While North Korea has built the Angkor Panorama museum within the country, reportedly relations are strained with some saying that Cambodia could cast off North Korea as a partner although this seems unlikely since North Korea has asked for help from the country in reducing tensions on the Korean Peninsula. In 2016, one United Nations expert claimed that the Supreme Court of Cambodia upholding "a life sentence for two top cadres of the 1970s Khmer Rouge found guilty of crimes against humanity" will send a "message" to the leaders of North Korea even though the said country never supported the Khmer Rouge. More directly, North Korea has defended Cambodia, saying in later 2016 that a division of the Office of the High Commissioner for Human Rights was operating illegally in the country, saying its operation violated the "principle of respect for sovereignty and non-interference in domestic affairs" and that "every year the U.N. raises the issue of human rights while violating the principle of fairness when discussing human rights and showing sympathy for hostile acts against sovereign states."
China (PRC)	October 6, 1949	See China–North Korea relations The Sino–Korean Friendship Bridge across the Yalu (Amnokgang) at Sinuiju and Dandong The People's Republic of China is often considered to be North Korea's closest ally. North Korea is also the only country with which China has a legally binding mutual aid and co-operation treaty. China and North Korea share a 1,416-kilometre long border (890 miles) that corresponds to the course of the Yalu and Tumen rivers, which both flow from Heaven Lake on Mount Paektu. The countries have six border crossings between them. The two countries are generally perceived to be on friendly terms; however, in recent years, both the relationship and friendliness between the two nations have gradually declined due to growing concern in the PRC over issues such as North Korea's nuclear weapons program, sinking of the ROKS Cheonan and their bombardment of Yeonpyeong. After North Korea conducted its first nuclear test in 2006, the Chinese government stated that they were "resolutely opposed to it" and voted for United Nations sanctions against North Korea. The Council on Foreign Relations suggests that the China's main priority in its bilateral relations with North Korea is to prevent the collapse of Kim Jong Un's government, concerned that such an event would provoke a surge of North Korean refugees into China. All the while Chinese counterparts are interested in a buffer zone to US-allied South Korea, it also suggests, however, that Chinese-North Korea relations may be soured due to China's concerns about Japan's remilitarization in response to North Korea's military behaviour. The PRC permitted the Yanbian Korean Ethnic Group Autonomous Prefecture to conduct border trade with North Korea in August 1954. In the 1950s, border trade between China and North Korea reached as high as 7.56 million Chinese renminbi. Trade was suspended due to the Cultural Revolution until a new contract was signed in 1982 between China and North Korea, which set the Swiss franc as the exchange currency. Since then, China-North Korea border trade has increased rapidly with the trade between Jilin Province and North Korea alone reaching 1.03 million Swiss francs (510K USD). Trade volume amounted to 11.99 million Swiss francs (CHF) in 1983 (5.71M USD), CHF 100 million in 1985 (40.70M USD), CHF 160 million in 1988 (109.34M USD), and CHF 150 million (88.2M USD) in 1990. The PRC is North Korea's largest trade partner, while North Korea ranked 82nd (in 2009) in China's trade partners. China provides about half of all North Korea's imports and received a quarter of its exports. The PRC's major imports from North Korea includes mineral fuels (coal), ores, woven apparel, iron and steel, fish and seafood, and stone. North Korea's imports from mainland China include mineral fuels and oil, machinery, electrical machinery, vehicles, plastic, and iron and steel. The PRC is a major source for North Korea imports of petroleum. In 2009, exports to North Korea of mineral fuel oil totaled $327 million and accounted for 17% of all Chinese exports to North Korea. Much of China's trade with North Korea goes through the port of Dandong on the Yalu River. During the Korean War from 1950 to 1953, China assisted North Korea, sending as many as 500,000 soldiers to support North Korean forces. In 1975, Kim Il Sung visited Beijing in a failed attempt to solicit support from China for a military invasion of South Korea. On November 23, 2009, PRC Defence Minister Liang Guanglie visited Pyongyang, the first defense chief to visit since 2006. In 2019, Chinese President and General Secretary of the Communist Party Xi Jinping visited North Korea, the first for a Chinese paramount leader in 14 years. This has been widely considered by observers as the improvement of relations between the two countries. Before his visit, Xi reaffirmed North Korea on Rodong Sinmun that China would support them "no matter how the international situation changes".
Hong Kong	1997	See Hong Kong–North Korea relations Hong Kong and North Korea have had official relations established since 1997, after the transfer of sovereignty over Hong Kong from the United Kingdom to the People's Republic of China.
India		See India–North Korea relations India and North Korea have growing trade and diplomatic relations. India maintains a fully functioning embassy in Pyongyang and North Korea has an embassy in New Delhi. India has said that it wants the "reunification" of Korea. Many North Korean nationals receive training in India including in the fields of IT and science and technology. India has a bilateral trade of around half a billion dollars with North Korea. Also, India is increasingly being asked by the US to mediate in the Korean peninsula due to its strengthening relations with both North Korea and South Korea. India voted in favour of Security Council resolutions 82 and 83 relating to the Korean War. However, India did not support resolution 84 for military assistance to South Korea. As a non-aligned country, India declined to fight against North Korea. Instead, India decided to send a medical unit to Korea as a humanitarian gesture. The 60th Indian Field Ambulance Unit, a unit of the Indian Airborne Division, was selected to be dispatched to Korea. The unit consisted of 346-men including 14 doctors. After the Korean War, India again played an important role as the chair of the Neutral Nations Repatriation Commission in the Korean peninsula. India established consular relations with North Korea in 1962 and in 1973, established full diplomatic relations with it. India's relationship with North Korea has however been affected by North Korea's relations with Pakistan especially due to its help for Pakistan's nuclear missile program. In 1999, India impounded a North Korean ship off the Kandla coast that was found to be carrying missile components and blueprints. India's relations with South Korea have far greater economic and technological depth and India's keenness for South Korean investments and technology have in turn affected the North's relations with India. India has consistently voiced its opposition to North Korea's nuclear and missile tests. Trade between India and North Korea has seen a large increase in recent years. From an average total trade of barely $100 million in the middle of the 2000s, it shot up to over $1 billion in 2009. The trade is overwhelmingly in India's favour, with its exports accounting for roughly $1 billion while North Korea's exports to India were worth $57 million. India's primary export to North Korea is refined petroleum products while silver and auto parts are the main components of its imports from North Korea. India participated in the sixth Pyongyang Autumn International Trade Fair in October 2010 and there have been efforts to bring about greater economic cooperation and trade between the two countries since then. In 2010–11, Indo–North Korean trade stood at $572 million with India's exports accounting for $329 million. India has been providing training to North Korea's citizens in areas like science and technology and IT through agreements for such cooperation between Indian and North Korea's agencies and through India's International Technological and Economic Cooperation (ITEC) programme. In 2002 and 2004, India contributed 2000 tonnes of food grains to help North Korea tide over severe famine-like conditions. In 2010, India responded to North Korea's request for food aid and made available to it 1,300 tonnes of pulse and wheat worth $1 million through the UN World Food Programme.
Indonesia		See Indonesian–North Korea relations Indonesia maintains cordial relations with North Korea, despite international sanctions and isolation applied upon North Korea concerning its human rights abuses and nuclear missile program, and Indonesia's stronger engagement and partnership with South Korea. Both nations share a relationship that dates back to the Sukarno and Kim Il Sung era in the 60s when Sukarno presented Kim Il Sung an orchid that is named Kimilsungia. Indonesia has an embassy in Pyongyang, while North Korea has an embassy in Jakarta, with cordial diplomatic relations. Both nations are members of the Non-Aligned Movement, ~~with a North Korean restaurant in the country currently.~~ ^{(Closed as of April 2017)}
Iran		See Iran–North Korea relations Iran–North Korea relations are described as being positive by official news agencies of the two countries. Diplomatic relations picked up following the Iranian Revolution in 1979 and the establishment of an Islamic Republic. Iran and North Korea pledged cooperation in educational, scientific, and cultural spheres, as well as cooperating in the nuclear program of Iran. The United States has expressed its opposition towards North Korea's arms deals with Iran, which started during the 1980s during the Iran–Iraq War, as well as selling domestically produced weapons to Iran, with former US President George W. Bush labelling North Korea, Iran, and Iraq under Saddam Hussein as part of the "Axis of evil", in his conception.
Israel		See Israel–North Korea relations North Korean-Israeli relations are "perhaps the most estranged 'non-relations'" in the international community. Israeli–North Korea relations are tense, and North Korea does not recognise the state of Israel, denouncing it as an 'imperialist satellite'. Since 1988 it recognises the sovereignty of the State of Palestine over the territory held by Israel. Over the years, North Korea has supplied missile technology to Israel's neighbours, including Iran, Syria, Libya, and Egypt. Syria, which has a history of confrontations with Israel, has long maintained a relationship with North Korea based on the cooperation between their respective nuclear programs. On September 6, 2007, the Israeli Air Force conducted an airstrike on a target in the Deir ez-Zor region of Syria. According to Media and IAEA investigative reports, 10 North Korean nuclear scientists were killed during the airstrike. When North Korea opened up for Western tourists in 1986 it excluded citizens of Israel along with those of Japan, the United States, and South Africa. It has been suggested that North Korea has sought to model its nuclear weapons program on Israel's, as "a small-state deterrent for a country surrounded by powerful enemies; to display enough activity to make possession of a nuclear device plausible to the outside world, but with no announcement of possession: in short, to appear to arm itself with an ultimate trump card and keep everyone guessing whether and when the weapons might become available."
Kyrgyzstan	1992	Kyrgyzstan and North Korea established formal relations in 1992. Kyrgyzstan is the only country that allows North Koreans to travel to the country without a travel visa and grants unlimited stay. In 2018, diplomatic talks were held on bilateral relations improving between the two nations.
Japan		See Japan–North Korea relations Japan, along with South Korea, France and the United States, is one of the few countries that has no relations with North Korea. Historical hostility has resulted in incidents of confrontation between the two countries as well. However, numerous groups within Japan support North Korea. In May 2017, a delegation of officials from the Korean Youth League in Japan visited the birthplace of Kim Il Sung in Mangyongdae, touring the Mangyongdae Revolutionary Museum, the Korean Revolution Museum, the Mangyongdae Schoolchildren's Palace, and so on as part of their visit.
Laos		Laos maintains an embassy in Pyongyang, with Laos being a similar state ideologically. In February 2016 Kim Yong-chol made an official visit to Bounnhang Vorachith.
Malaysia	1973 (suspended 19 March 2021)	See Malaysia–North Korea relations Following the assassination of Kim Jong-nam at Kuala Lumpur International Airport in February 2017, relations between both countries deteriorated. On March 19, 2021, North Korea severed diplomatic relations with Malaysia due to the extradition of North Korean businessman Mul Chol Myong to the United States on money laundering charges. In response, the Malaysia Government defended the integrity of its judicial system and ordered all North Korean diplomats to leave Malaysia. Previously North Korea had maintained friendly diplomatic ties with Malaysia, with an embassy in Kuala Lumpur while Malaysia had an embassy in Pyongyang.
Mongolia	1948	See Mongolia–North Korea relations North Korea–Mongolia relations date back to 1948, when the Mongolian People's Republic recognized Kim Il Sung's Soviet-backed government in the North. Mongolia also provided assistance to the North during the Korean War. The two countries signed their first friendship and cooperation treaty in 1986. Kim Il Sung also paid a visit to the country in 1988. However, relations became strained after the collapse of the Communist government in Mongolia in 1992. The two countries nullified their earlier friendship and cooperation treaty in 1995, and in 1999, North Korea closed its embassy in Ulaanbaatar during an official visit by Kim Dae-jung, the first-ever such visit by a South Korean president. Mongolia had previously expelled two North Korean diplomats but later pursued a policy of engagement.
Myanmar	May 1975	See Myanmar–North Korea relations Myanmar (formerly Burma) and North Korea established bilateral diplomatic relations in May 1975. The history of contacts between the two countries goes back to 1948, the year of the declaration of Burmese independence. Initially however, Myanmar under U Nu favored Syngman Rhee's government in the south of Korea. During and after the Korean War, Myanmar balanced the interest of North and South Korea, taking into consideration the position of China. After the 1975 establishment of diplomatic relations, Myanmar began to shift toward North Korea, which was also nominally socialist and equally wary of both US and China. The Rangoon bombing on October 9, 1983, was a turning point in Myanmar–North Korea relations. Once it found out that North Koreans were behind the attack, Myanmar cut off diplomatic relations and went as far as withdrawing formal recognition of the country. Relations began to recover during the years of the Sunshine Policy when South Korea encouraged the North's rapprochement with Myanmar. Strategic considerations brought Myanmar and North Korea even closer. Myanmar had natural resources that North Korea needed, and North Korea began supplying Myanmar with military technology. Diplomatic relations were restored on April 25, 2007. Military cooperation between North Korea and Myanmar deepened into cooperation with nuclear issues. Myanmar is believed to operate a nuclear weapons program that seeks to emulate the success of North Korea's nuclear weapons capability. The program is supported by North Korean training and equipment. Although the 2011–2015 Myanmar political reforms have led to the cancellation or downgrading of military ties, reports on suspicious activities have continued as of 2018.
Pakistan		See North Korea–Pakistan relations Pakistan maintains warm diplomatic and trade relations with North Korea, while still maintaining friendly relations with South Korea. The start of relations between the two countries emerged sometime in the 1970s during the rule of Pakistani Prime Minister Zulfikar Ali Bhutto. North Korea maintains an embassy in Islamabad. Relations between the two countries are reported to have been strong in the past and North Korea has supplied missile technology to Pakistan even as the populace of Pakistan is divided on North Korea.
Palestine	1966	See North Korea–Palestine relations North Korea established relations with the Palestine Liberation Organization in 1966. Beyond this, North Korea has long seen Israel as an "imperialist satellite" and recognizes the sovereignty of Palestine over all territory held by Israel, excluding the Golan Heights, which is considered as Syrian Territory. After the demise of the Soviet Union, North Korea's involvement in the Israeli–Palestinian conflict declined and North Korea shifted from the exporting of revolution to pragmatism. During the Gaza War (2008–09) North Korea harshly condemned Israeli actions, with a Foreign Ministry spokesman denounced the killing of unarmed civilians and called it a crime against humanity. Later, on the floor of the UN General Assembly North Korea permanent representative Sin Son-ho said that North Korea "fully supported Palestinians' struggle to expel Israeli aggressors from their Territory and restore their right to self-determination." After the 2010 Gaza flotilla raid North Korea Foreign Ministry called the attack a "crime against humanity" perpetrated under the guidance of the United States, with North Korea also expressing full support for the self-determination of the Palestinian Arabs. During the 2014 Israel-Gaza conflict, the Foreign Ministry issued a statement that read: "We bitterly denounce Israel's brutal killings of many defenseless Palestinians through indiscriminate military attacks on peaceable residential areas in Palestine as they are unpardonable crimes against humanity."
Philippines	2000	See North Korea–Philippines relations In 2000, the Philippines and North Korea established diplomatic relations after more than 20 years of negotiations. Trade between the two countries remains almost non-existent as a trade embargo remains in place. In 2007, the agreement was boosted further and was signed by Philippine Foreign Secretary Alberto Romulo and North Korean Foreign Minister Pak Ui Chun during the Association of South-east Asian Nations (ASEAN) meeting in Manila. The Philippines has a representative in Pyongyang through an embassy in Beijing. North Korea has a representative through its embassy in Bangkok.
Singapore	1975	See North Korea–Singapore relations North Korea maintains an embassy in Singapore.
Sri Lanka		In 1970, North Korea trade delegation's office in Colombo became an embassy. While in the country, North Korea diplomats cultivated links with the Marxist–Leninist Janatha Vimukthi Peramuna. In 1971, in the wake of a failed uprising by the JVP, the embassy was closed.
Syria		See North Korea–Syria relations Syria and North Korea have had close relations since the late 1960s, when North Korea provided military assistance to Syria in its wars with Israel. They maintain embassies in the other country's respective capitals. North Korea built a nuclear reactor in Syria based on the design of its own reactor at Yongbyon, and North Korean officials traveled regularly to the site. The Syrian reactor was destroyed by Israel in an airstrike in 2007. The United States signed the Iran North Korea Syria Nonproliferation Act in 2000. In 2016, there were reports that North Korean troops were fighting to defend the Syrian government in the Syrian Civil War.
Taiwan		See North Korea-Taiwan relations The Republic of China (Taiwan) does not maintain formal or informal diplomatic relations with North Korea, whilst North Korea considers the Taiwanese government to be illegitimate. Premier Lai Ching-te approved a total ban on trade between Taiwan and North Korea in September 2017. Taiwanese businessmen have been accused of selling coal, oil and gas to North Korea, as well as importing North Korean textiles and employing North Koreans in Taiwanese fishing vessels.
Turkey	January 15, 2001	See North Korea–Turkey relations: The Embassy of North Korea in Sofia is accredited to Turkey.; The Turkish Embassy in Seoul is accredited to North Korea.
Vietnam		See North Korea–Vietnam relations Students from North Vietnam began going to North Korea to study as early as the 1960s, even before the formal establishment of Korean-language education in their country. North Korea lent material and manpower support to North Vietnam during the Vietnam War, though the number of South Korean troops fighting for South Vietnam was larger. As a result of a decision of the Korean Workers' Party in October 1966, in early 1967 North Korea sent a fighter squadron to North Vietnam to back up the North Vietnamese 921st and 923rd fighter squadrons defending Hanoi. They stayed through 1968; 200 pilots were reported to have served. In addition, at least two anti-aircraft artillery regiments were sent as well. North Korea also sent weapons, ammunition and two million sets of uniforms to their comrades in North Vietnam. Kim Il Sung is reported to have told his pilots to "fight in the war as if the Vietnamese sky were their own".

=== Europe ===
Country	Formal Relations Began	Notes
European Union		See also: North Korea–European Union relations North Korea had economic interests in the European Union. In March 2002, North Korea's trade minister visited certain EU member states, including Belgium, Italy, the United Kingdom, and Sweden, and the country has also been known to send short-term trainees to Europe. Additionally, workshops regarding North Korea's economic reform have taken place with EU diplomats and economists as participants. The EU still is concerned about human rights violations occurring within the country and has hosted talks with North Korean defectors.
Albania	November 28, 1948	See also: Albania–North Korea relations Diplomatic relations with Albania were established on November 28, 1948. Albania's communist government led by Enver Hoxha was often likened to the isolation of North Korea. In 1961, Albania and North Korea signed a joint declaration of friendship. In the 1970s, relations between the two countries deteriorated, with Hoxha writing in June 1977 that Kim Il Sung and the leadership of the Korean Workers' Party had betrayed the Korean people by accepting aid from other countries, primarily between countries in the Eastern Bloc and non-aligned countries such as Yugoslavia. As a result, relations between North Korea and Albania would remain low until Hoxha's death in 1985. In 2012, the President of the Supreme People's Assembly Kim Yong-nam sent a congratulatory message to Albanian President Bujar Nishani on the 100th Anniversary of the Independence of Albania.
Austria		Diplomatic relations between Austria and North Korea have consistently been rather close, with the former President of Austria Heinz Fischer having been a founding member and co-chairman in the Austria-DPRK Friendship Organization(조선.오스트리아친선협회(오지리)). With the changes in government in 2000 and 2017 respectively, relations took a light hit, with the parties in coalition, namely the ÖVP and FPÖ, generally utilizing an anti-North Korean stance and using such to defame their political opponents. Austria was the host of the Golden Star Bank, the last bank instituted and owned by North Korea in Europe.
Bulgaria	November 29, 1948	Bulgaria and North Korea generally have good relations. Diplomatic relations between the countries were established on November 29, 1948, and a bilateral agreement on cultural and scientific cooperation was signed in 1970. Kim Il Sung visited the People's Republic of Bulgaria for the first time in the 1950s, and again in 1975. Bulgarian volunteers provided basic aid to North Korea during the Korean War by providing items such as clothing and foodstuffs. Even after the fall of communism in Eastern Europe, the countries retained active diplomatic relations. The foreign language institute in Pyongyang maintains a Bulgarian language department. In the past, the two countries also cooperated closely in the sphere of sports, and still maintain such cooperation albeit to a lesser degree. In 2017, the primer of North Korea, Pak Pong Ju, sent a message to Boyko Borisov, congratulating him on his appointment as prime minister of Bulgaria, saying that "relations of friendship and cooperation between the two countries" should favorably develop "in common interests". The same day, North Korea's foreign minister, Ri Yong Ho, sent a message, similar in content, to Ekaterina Gecheva-Zaharieva, congratulating her on "appointment as vice prime minister and foreign minister of Bulgaria".
Belarus	1992	Diplomatic relations were established in 1992. Since 2016, North Korea has operated an embassy in Minsk, opened in 2016, while Belarus has a consulate in Hamgyong-namdo, despite the fact that the Belarusian government recognizes this as a trade mission and works through other representatives in Moscow (Russia). North Korean President Kim Il Sung visited Minsk, the capital of the Belarusian SSR in 1984. During the visit, he visited the Minsk Tractor Works and the Brest Fortress. In 2020, Belarusian President Aleksandr Lukashenko suggested improving the relations between North Korea and Belarus, stating that the relations are on an "unreasonably low level". He stated that the relations should be improved with a focus on "medication and food production, professional training and professional development".
Denmark		See Denmark–North Korea relations Denmark is represented in North Korea through its embassy in Hanoi, Vietnam.
Finland	1 June 1973	See Finland–North Korea relations Finland recognised North Korea on April 13, 1973. Diplomatic relations were established on June 1, 1973. Finland has a resident ambassador posted in Seoul. North Korea owes the government and other private businesses over 30 million Euros that date back to the 1970s. In April 2017 government officials reassured YLE news reporters that they have not forgotten about the debt, and will work to find a solution to their debts.
France		See France–North Korea relations Relations between the French Republic and North Korea are officially non-existent. France is one of only two European Union members not to maintain diplomatic relations with North Korea, the other being Estonia. There is no French embassy, nor any other type of French diplomatic representation, in Pyongyang, and no North Korean embassy in Paris, although a North Korean diplomatic office is located in nearby Neuilly-sur-Seine. France's official position is that it will consider establishing diplomatic relations with North Korea if and when the latter abandons its nuclear weapons program and improves its human rights record.
Germany	1949 (East Germany) March 1, 2001 (Federal Republic of Germany)	See Germany–North Korea relations The relations between Germany and North Korea date back to 1949, when the governments of East Germany and North Korea established diplomatic relations. The embassies in East Berlin and Pyongyang opened 1954. East Germany used to be one of North Korea's closest allies within the Eastern Communist states, so multiple co-operation agreements and trade ties were established. West Germany remained in a rather hostile position towards North Korea during the Cold War and only maintained basic diplomatic contact; however, in 1981, a delegation of North Korean officials visited Bonn, the federal capital of West Germany. After German re-unification under the Federal Republic, Germany maintained a diplomatic mission in the former East German Embassy and officially opened its embassy in Pyongyang in 2001, while North Korea re-opened its embassy in Berlin the same year. These diplomatic ties are still active, but due to the massive UN sanctions there is very little economic cooperation between the two countries. Also, Germany has continued to condemn the North Korean nuclear program.
Hungary		See Hungary–North Korea relations Relations between the two countries have existed since the Korean War; however, conflicts beginning in the late 1980s strained relations. When the Hungarian Revolution of 1956 began, roughly 200 of North Korean students joined in; their war experience proved to be of aid to the Hungarian students. In the aftermath of the revolution, Hungarian police and Soviet forces gathered up the students from North Korea and deported them back to North Korea, with four of them escaping to Austria. In 1989, Hungary would become the first Eastern Bloc nation to open relations with South Korea; in response, North Korea withdrew Kim Pyong-il from Hungary and sent him to Bulgaria instead. In response, North Korea referred to the Hungarian decision as a "betrayal", and expelled the Hungarian envoy to Pyongyang. As a result, there was a downturn in bilateral ties which lasted over a decade-and-a-half but in 2004, then-deputy State Secretary Gábor Szentiványi indicated that his government were interested in improving their relations with North Korea, even though by 2009, the former Hungarian embassy building in Pyongyang remained empty.
Iceland		See Iceland–North Korea relations
Italy	January 2000	See Italy–North Korea relations While North Korea was considered isolationist and "politically reclusive" by the Italian government for years, in January 2000, Italy announced its opening of official diplomatic relations with North Korea. Later, North Korea's representative for the UN's Food and Agriculture Organization met with Lamberto Dini to formally establish diplomatic ties, with formal ties considered a huge step for North Korea.
Malta		During the Cold War, Malta had good relations with North Korea. The future leader Kim Jong Il spent a year there learning English in 1973. The Maltese Prime Minister Dom Mintoff traveled to Pyongyang to meet President Kim Il Sung in 1982. They signed a secret military agreement whereby North Korea supplied Malta with weapons and military training. In 1984, Malta severed ties with South Korea.
Netherlands	2001	The Netherlands and North Korea have maintained diplomatic relations since 2001. In 2011, the two countries celebrated 10 years of diplomatic relations, and for the occasion North Korea showed three Dutch documentaries in Pyongyang, including one about Dutch water management. Contact with North Korea are maintained by the Dutch ambassador in Seoul, South Korea. North Korea's embassy in Bern, Switzerland serves North Korea's interests in the Netherlands. The Netherlands is worried about the violations of human rights and the development of nuclear technologies in North Korea, and has urged North Korea to improve their bilateral relations with South Korea. There is little economic interest between the two countries. The most recent data about trade between the two countries dates back to 2011, and showed a decline. While the Netherlands does not have a bilateral development relationship with North Korea, it does participate in several humanitarian projects through the UN, EU and the International Red Cross. In addition, Wageningen University and Research Centre and the Academy of Agricultural Sciences in Pyongyang are working together on several projects concerning food safety and recent developments in potato farming.
Norway		See North Korea–Norway relations
Poland	October 16, 1948	See North Korea–Poland relations Poland maintains diplomatic and limited trading (fishing) relations with North Korea after relations between the two countries began on October 16, 1948. Poland maintains an embassy in Pyongyang, with economic relations between the two countries currently maintained at the symbolic level of trade and sailing co-operation
Portugal	Suspended October 11, 2017	See North Korea–Portugal relations Kim Yong-nam has made statements affirming the good relationship between the two countries, such as the condolences he gave then-President Jorge Sampaio when Francisco da Costa Gomes died, and the congratulations he extended to President Aníbal Cavaco Silva after he won the Portuguese elections. In 2017, Portugal cut diplomatic ties with North Korea.
Romania	November 3, 1948	See North Korea–Romania relations The People's Republic of Romania and North Korea established diplomatic relations on November 3, 1948. The two states had little contact until Nicolae Ceaușescu and Kim Il Sung met in 1971 as part of Ceaușescu's Asian tour. The two were close allies, and got along both in terms of political and personal relations. During the trip, Ceausescu took a liking to North Korea's Juche ideology. This experience contributed to his formerly liberal stance taking a turn for totalitarianism. It was the first of many times Ceaușescu would visit Pyongyang. Both countries host embassies to one another. Since the Romanian Revolution, contact between the two countries has been extremely limited.
Russia	October 12, 1948	See North Korea–Russia relations North Korean Leader Kim Jong Un (left) and Russian President Vladimir Putin (right), April 2019. Russia and North Korea maintain friendly relations and Russia is generally seen as the second most important ally of North Korea after China. Russia–North Korea relations are generally determined by Russia's strategic interests in Korea and the goal of preserving peace and stability in the Korean peninsula. Russia's official position is by extension its stance on settlement of the North Korean nuclear crisis. North Korea voted against a U.N. resolution calling on Russia to end its invasion of Ukraine. In October 2024, reports emerged that North Korean soldiers were being trained in Russia, potentially to be deployed in Ukraine.
Serbia	1948	See North Korea–Serbia relations Serbia maintains friendly relations with North Korea, with relations between FPR Yugoslavia and North Korea starting in 1948 under the Yugoslav Premier (later President) Josip Broz Tito. In March 2017, North Korean Ambassador Ri Pyong Du visited Belgrade and affirmed North Korea's support of Serbia's position on Kosovo.
Slovenia		Slovenia and North Korea have a bilateral relation that began in 1948, during the time of Yugoslavia.
Spain		See also: North Korea–Spain relations and Raid on North Korea's embassy in Madrid In January 2014, North Korea opened an embassy in Madrid. Following a series of nuclear and missile tests by North Korea in 2017, Spain declared the North Korean ambassador, Kim Hyok Chol, persona non grata on September 18. On the afternoon of February 22, 2019, ten perpetrators, mostly Korean, broke into the North Korean embassy according to Spanish police. Spain's National Intelligence Centre suspected that at least some of the perpetrators had ties to the American Central Intelligence Agency and South Korea's National Intelligence Service. Embassy staff were beaten during interrogation. After one staff member managed to escape and caught the attention of a resident in the neighbourhood, the police were called. Officers arriving at the scene tried to enter the embassy but were refused by a man who claimed there was no cause for alarm. Soon after, two vehicles belonging to the embassy left and afterwards were abandoned nearby. The perpetrators had taken computers and mobiles phones. Spain's authorities suspect the attack was done in order to obtain information on Kim Hyok Chol who was part of a delegation which attempted to negotiate nuclear disarmament with the United States Special Representative for North Korea Stephen Biegun. Spanish court released details of the probe into attack on the embassy, perpetrators soon after attack went to Portugal and boarded plane for the US. 7 individuals were identified from the group, among them Adrian Hong Chang, founder of Liberty in North Korea as leader of the group. Court disclosed details of before, during and after the raid of the embassy by the group which consisted of citizens from the US, Mexico and South Korea. The group attempted to convince one of the embassy attache to defect. Arrest warrants for Hong Chang and another person were issued by Spanish authorities. The alleged group leader contacted Federal Bureau of Investigation.
Sweden		See North Korea–Sweden relations Sweden was the first Western country to open an embassy in North Korea. The embassy is located in Pyongyang, and "Sweden serves as the interim consular protecting power for American, Finnish, Australian and Canadian interests in North Korea." The Swedish-Korean Association has friendly ties with North Korea government and works to promote solidarity with and support for it.
Switzerland		See North Korea–Switzerland relations Switzerland is an active member of the Neutral Nations Supervisory Commission (NNSC), an international organization for the prevention of hostilities on the Korean peninsula. Switzerland conducts regular political dialogue with North Korea, the last meeting taking place in October 2011. North Korea maintains both an embassy in Bern and a permanent mission in Geneva. Switzerland's embassy in Beijing is accredited to Pyongyang but the Swiss also have a permanent office for Development and Cooperation in North Korea, responsible for humanitarian aid. Cooperation in the domain of education was maintained but North Korea's interest to work closer with Swiss companies has been put on hold since May 2016, when the Swiss cabinet introduced "considerably tighter sanctions" to slow down North Korea's nuclear proliferation. In the aftermath of North Korea's nuclear weapons test on September 3, 2017, Swiss Federal Councilor and President Doris Leuthard emphasized the need for renewed negotiations, and offered pertinent mediation services between the United States and North Korea.
Turkey	2001	See North Korea–Turkey relations Turkey did not have any diplomatic relations with North Korea before 2001. In a statement made in 2001 in Beijing by the Turkish and North Korean embassies, Turkey officially recognized North Korea and on January 15, 2001, both countries established diplomatic relations. Turkey is represented in North Korea through its embassy in Seoul, South Korea. North Korea is represented in Turkey through its embassy in Sofia, Bulgaria. Turkey fought against North Korea during the Korean War, in which approximately 487 Turkish soldiers died. In June 2018, Turkey and North Korea began negotiations to return the remains of deceased Turkish soldiers.
Ukraine (formal relations suspended in July 2022)	January 9, 1992	See North Korea–Ukraine relations. Diplomatic relations between North Korea and Ukraine were established in 1992. Relations were suspended in July 2022 after North Korea recognized separatist republics in eastern Ukraine.
United Kingdom	December 12, 2000	See North Korea–United Kingdom relations Following initial progress in North Korea–South Korea relations, North Korea and the United Kingdom established diplomatic relations on December 12, 2000, opening resident embassies in London and Pyongyang. The United Kingdom provides English language and human rights training to North Korean officials, urging North Korea government to allow a visit by the UN Special Rapporteur for Human Rights, and it oversees bilateral humanitarian projects in North Korea. To mark the tenth anniversary of North Korea's relations with the United Kingdom, an edited version of the 2002 film Bend It Like Beckham was broadcast on North Korean state television on December 26, 2010. The British Ambassador to South Korea, Martin Uden, posted on Twitter that it was the "1st ever Western-made film to air on TV" in North Korea. Good relations between the two nations have been in existence as far back as 1966 when the North Korea national football team played in the 1966 World Cup in England. North Korea team became the adopted team of Middlesbrough which was where they played their group games during the competition. Middlesbrough fans went on to support North Korea team in the next round of the tournament, with many travelling to Liverpool to watch the team against Portugal. In 2002, members of North Korea team returned to Middlesbrough for an official visit.

=== Oceania ===
Country	Formal Relations Began	Notes
Australia	1975 but lapsed, before resuming in May 2000	See Australia–North Korea relations Australia and North Korea maintain diplomatic relations. Neither country has a diplomatic presence in the other country, and relations are strained by disputes such as over North Korea's nuclear program and alleged drug trafficking.
New Zealand	March 2001	See New Zealand–North Korea relations Relations between the two countries have been almost non-existent since the establishment of North Korea. During the 1950s, New Zealand fought against North Korea in the Korean War, siding with the United States and South Korea. Since then, New Zealand had little contact with North Korea until 2001, when New Zealand recognised the North Korean state in March 2001, followed by the New Zealand's Foreign Affairs Minister Phil Goff meeting his North Korean counterpart Paek Nam-sun. Diplomatic relations were established shortly thereafter. New Zealand has accredited its embassy in South Korea to North Korea as well. New Zealand Ambassador Patrick Rata is in charge of New Zealand's relations with both South and North Korea. New Zealand's Foreign Affairs Minister Winston Peters made a trip to Pyongyang on November 20, 2007. The Foreign Affairs Minister had talks with President Kim Yong-nam in his two-day visit to North Korea's capital. Areas in which New Zealand is looking to co-operate could include agriculture, training, and conservation.

== International organizations ==
North Korea is a member of the following international organizations:

- Animal Production and Health Commission for Asia and the Pacific
- Asia and Pacific Plant Protection Commission
- Asia-Pacific Broadcasting Union
- Asia/Pacific Group on Money Laundering (observer)
- Asia-Pacific Telecommunity
- Asian–African Legal Consultative Organization
- ASEAN Regional Forum
- Asia-Europe Meeting
- Bureau International des Expositions
- Centre for Agriculture and Bioscience International
- Codex Alimentarius Commission
- Common Fund for Commodities
- Conference on Disarmament
- Convention on Biological Diversity
- Federation Internationale de Football Association (FIFA)
- Food and Agriculture Organization of the United Nations
- Group of 77
- Intergovernmental Oceanographic Commission
- Intergovernmental Organization for Marketing Information and Technical Advisory Services for Fishery Products in the Asian and Pacific Region
- International Bureau of Education
- International Bureau of Weights and Measures
- International Civil Aviation Organization
- International Electrotechnical Commission (associate member)
- International Red Cross and Red Crescent Movement
- International Fund for Agricultural Development
- International Federation of Red Cross and Red Crescent Societies
- International Hydrographic Organization
- International Maritime Organization
- International Mobile Satellite Organization
- International Olympic Committee
- International Organization for Standardization
- International Organization of Legal Metrology (correspondent member)
- International Telecommunications Satellite Organization
- International Telecommunication Union
- International Textile & Clothing Bureau
- Intersputnik International Organization of Space Communications
- Inter-Parliamentary Union
- Joint Institute for Nuclear Research
- Non-Aligned Movement
- Organization for Cooperation of Railways
- Partnerships in Environmental Management for the Seas of East Asia
- Society for Worldwide Interbank Financial Telecommunication
- The South Centre
- United Nations
- United Nations Children's Fund (UNICEF)
- United Nations Conference on Trade and Development
- United Nations Development Fund for Women
- United Nations Development Programme
- United Nations Economic and Social Commission for Asia and the Pacific
- United Nations Educational, Scientific, and Cultural Organization (UNESCO)
- United Nations Environment Programme
- United Nations Industrial Development Organization
- United Nations Population Fund
- World Tourism Organization
- Universal Postal Union
- World Federation of Trade Unions
- World Food Programme
- World Health Organization
- World Intellectual Property Organization
- World Meteorological Organization
- World Organisation for Animal Health

== Notable people ==
- Pak Tong-chun, diplomat

== See also ==
- List of diplomatic missions in North Korea
- List of diplomatic missions of North Korea
- Foreign relations of South Korea

== Remarks ==
- Deployment of North Korean soldiers to Russia
- Armstrong, Charles K. (2013). Tyranny of the Weak: North Korea and the World, 1950–1992. Cornell University Press. ISBN 978-0-8014-6894-0.
- North Korea Handbook. Yonhap News Agency: Seoul. 2002. ISBN 978-0-7656-3523-5.
- Hoare, James E. (2012). "Chronology". Historical Dictionary of Democratic People's Republic of Korea. Lanham: Scarecrow Press. pp. xxvii–lx. ISBN 978-0-8108-7987-4.
- Schaefer, Bernd (2009). "Communist Vanguard Contest in East Asia during the 1960s and 1970s". In Vu, T.; Wongsurawat, W. (eds.). Dynamics of the Cold War in Asia: Ideology, Identity, and Culture. New York: Springer. pp. 113–126. ISBN 978-0-230-10199-9.
- Seekins, Donald M. (2017). "Korea, Democratic People's Republic of (North Korea), Relations with". Historical Dictionary of Burma (Myanmar) (2nd ed.). Lanham: Rowman & Littlefield Publishers. pp. 307–308. ISBN 978-1-5381-0183-4.
- Selth, Andrew (2004). Burma's North Korean Gambit: A Challenge to Regional Security? (PDF). Canberra: Strategic and Defence Studies Centre, Australian National University. ISBN 0-7315-5441-8. Archived (PDF) from the original on April 14, 2019.
- Wertz, Daniel; Oh, JJ; Kim, Insung (August 2016). Issue Brief: DPRK Diplomatic Relations (PDF). The National Committee on North Korea. Archived from the original (PDF) on December 28, 2016.
