= Armenia–North Korea relations =

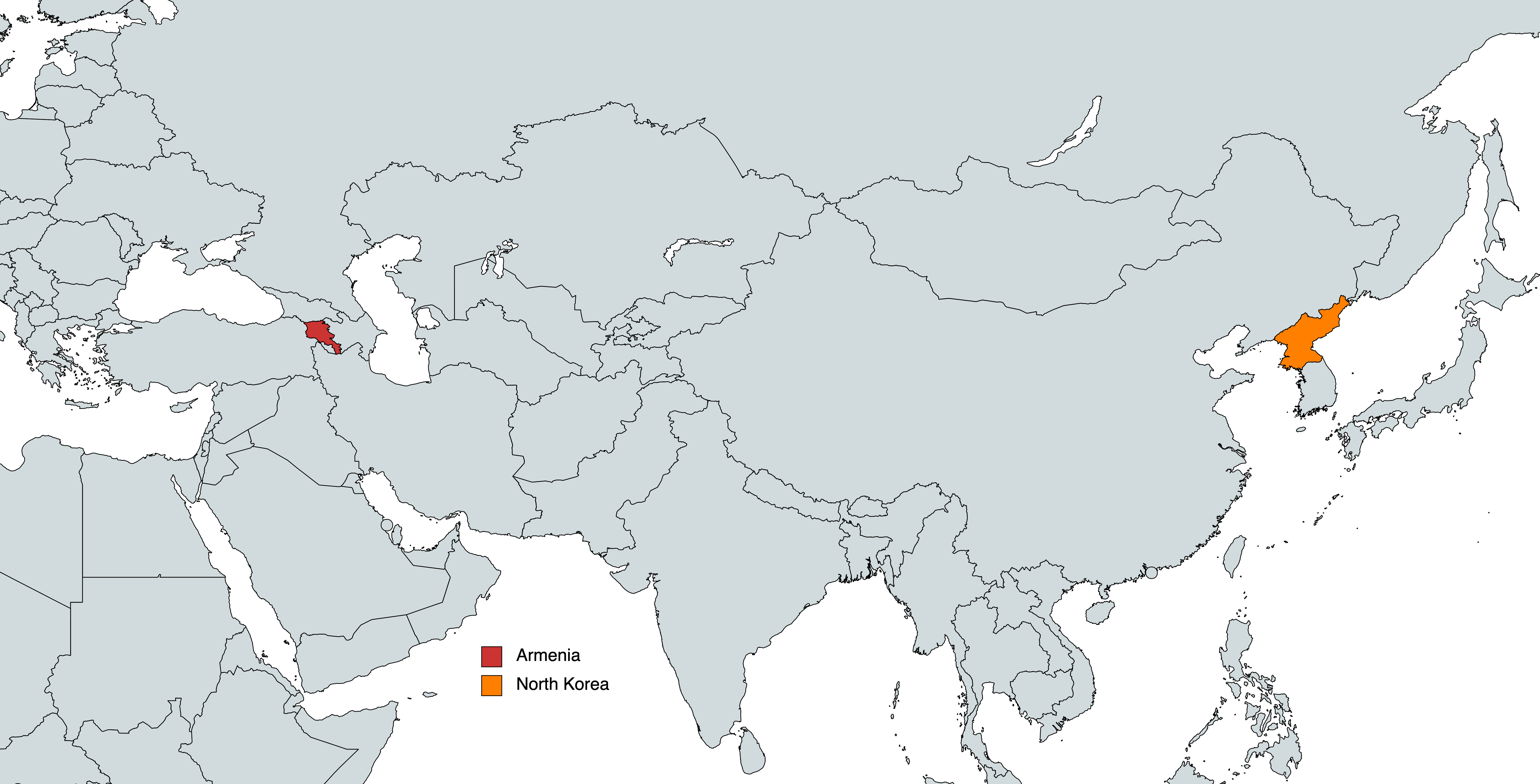

- Armenia: North Korea

Armenia–North Korea relations are the bilateral relations between Armenia and North Korea.

== History ==
Armenia and North Korea established diplomatic relations on 21 February 1992, upon Armenia's independence from the Soviet Union. On 26 September 1995, both states signed a cooperation protocol in Yerevan between each country's foreign ministries of affairs. The North Korean ambassador to Russia with residency in Moscow, has been accredited to Armenia in November 2016, but was recalled in May 2019. Due to not having an extensive relationship, current diplomatic missions are limited. A cultural cooperation agreement between the Government of Armenia and the Government of DPRK was signed in Yerevan on 5 April 2002.

== Economic and trade relations ==
North Korea exported $288,000 worth of goods to Armenia in 2023, mainly raw plastic sheeting, processed fruits and nuts, and cars.

== North Korea's use of ballistic missiles ==
Armenia has condemned North Korea's ballistic missile test and has supported EU sanctions against North Korea. Relations in this area have not progressed properly due to Armenia's protests against North Korea's many policy violations.

== See also ==
- Foreign relations of Armenia
- Foreign relations of North Korea
