= North Korea–Turkey relations =

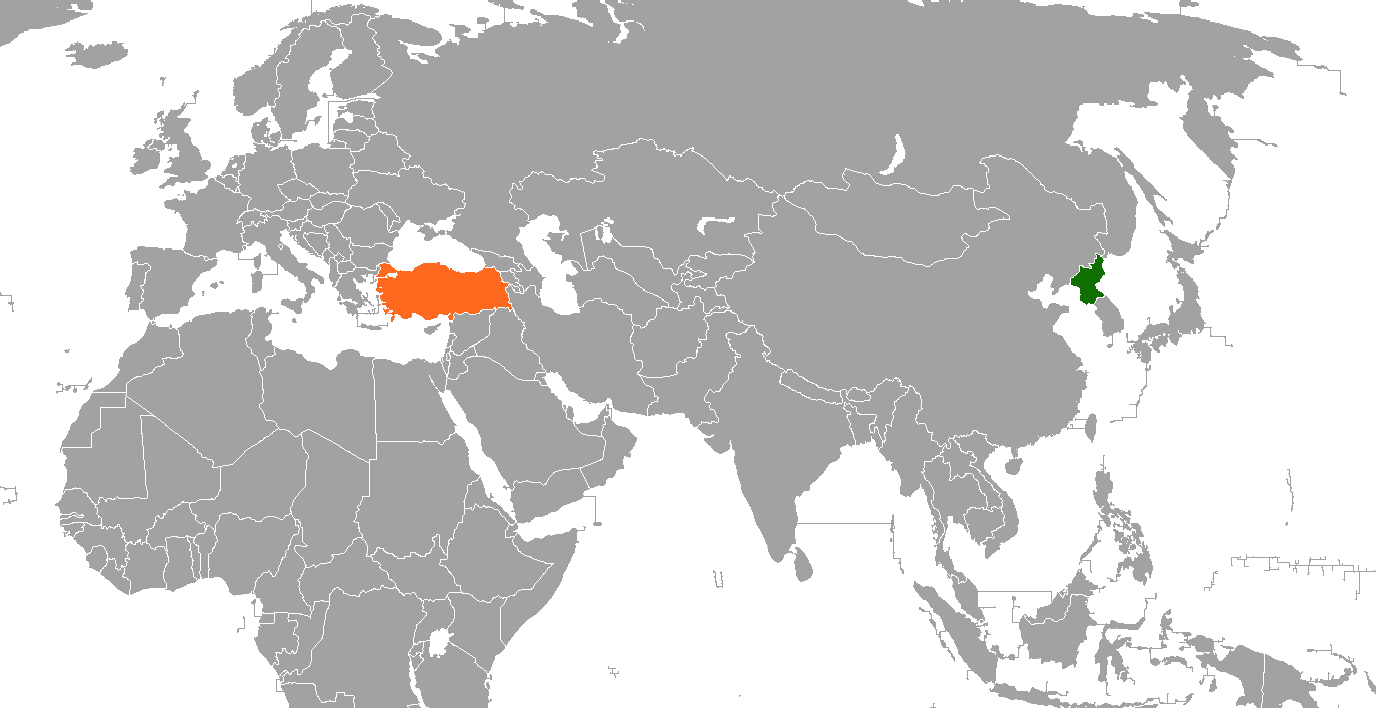

- North Korea: Turkey

North Korea–Turkey relations (Korean:뛰르끼예-조선민주주의 인민공화국 관계) are the foreign relations between North Korea and Turkey. The Turkish ambassador in Seoul is accredited to North Korea. North Korea's ambassador in Sofia, Bulgaria is accredited to Turkey.

Turkey supported South Korea against North Korea during the Korean War. The two countries have a limited relationship, as Turkey maintains close ties with South Korea and supports sanctions against North Korea and a denuclearised Korean Peninsula.

== Diplomatic relations ==
Early contacts between the Koreans and Turks can be traced back to antiquity, when the Göktürks had supported ancient Goguryeo, a Korean kingdom, during their expansion and also assisted them against Tang Chinese forces. As both Göktürks and Goguryeo were threatened by the Tang dynasty of China, they formed a political, economic, and military alliance. Göktürk soldiers assisted Goguryeo in many battles, including in the war against Silla, another Korean kingdom, and Tang China; this alliance went on extended to the Balhae as well. Commerce and correspondence was also maintained through the ancient Silk Road after a part of the ancient Oghuz Turks migrated westward and settled in the lands of Anatolia (today Turkey).

Until 2001, North Korea's post-World War II policy toward Turkey was mainly aimed at minimizing cooperation between Turkey and South Korea. In a quest to end its diplomatic and economic isolation, North Korea established diplomatic relations on June 27, 2001. When the Bush administration determined that North Korea was in violation of the 1994 agreement on North Korea's nuclear weapons program, bilateral relations between the two nations have been very limited.

== Economic relations ==
There was some level of trade volume between Turkey and North Korea from 2019-2020 according to Trading Economics, though are not considered especially significant.

== See also ==
- Foreign relations of North Korea
- Foreign relations of Turkey
- South Korea–Turkey relations
