= North Korea–Norway relations =

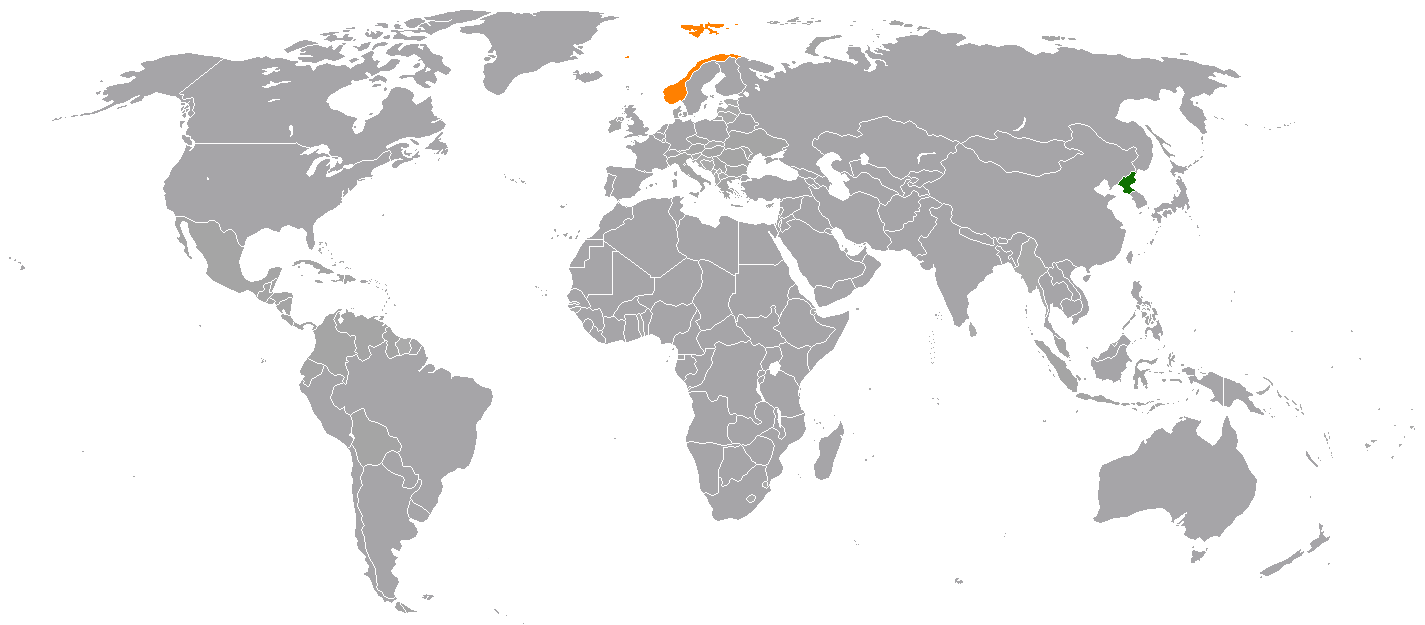

- North Korea: Norway

North Korea–Norway relations (Korean: 노르웨이-조선민주주의인민공화국 관계) refers to the current and historical relationship between Norway and the Democratic People's Republic of Korea (DPRK), commonly known as North Korea. Neither country maintains an embassy in the other, although North Korea formerly had an embassy in the Norwegian capital Oslo. The Norwegian ambassador in Seoul is also accredited to North Korea, as is the North Korean one in Stockholm to Norway.

== History ==
As a member of the United Nations (and with the Norwegian politician Trygve Lie serving as the organization's Secretary-General) and a close ally of the United States through its participation in the North Atlantic Treaty Organization, Norway entered the Korean War against the nascent North Korea in 1951. This was carried out through the creation of NORMASH, the Norwegian Mobile Army Surgical Hospital, which operated until 1954. This medical deployment, which involved 623 Norwegian citizens, led to strong ties with the anti-Communist South Korea.

Between April and November 1973, all Nordic countries – Norway included – established diplomatic relations with the DPRK, following a joint press conference by the nations' foreign ministers. This was a breakthrough for the country, as it ended its diplomatic isolation in Western Europe. However, trouble soon ensued, with a major diplomatic scandal taking place within only three years. In late October 1976 the Norwegian police caught North Korean diplomats selling 4,000 bottles of smuggled liquor and large amounts of smuggled cigarettes. The diplomats, bypassing the strict Scandinavian alcohol taxation, had trafficked the wares in their diplomatic luggage. It was estimated that the DPRK's embassy in Norway had sold alcohol and tobacco at a black market price value of over one million contemporary United States dollars. Similar networks were quickly discovered in Denmark, Sweden and Finland, causing a media storm. The same month, other North Korean diplomats in Norway were caught handing large amounts of hashish to local drug dealers, an early case of North Korea's illicit activities abroad.

In June 1979, North Korean agents abducted South Korean teacher Ko Sang-moon in Norway, who had taken a taxi and stated his destination was "Embassy of Korea" but the driver took him to the embassy of the wrong country.

During a 2006 visit to the Kaesong Industrial Region, the Norwegian ambassador in Seoul Arild Braastad commented positively on the project's potential to solve the situation in the Korean peninsula. The same year, the North Korean ambassador in Stockholm Jon In Chan stated that he would like Norway to help mediate in the dispute between North Korea and the international community on the issue of nuclear power. Norwegian State Secretary Raymond Johansen commented that he was considering a trip to the DPRK, and viewed the ambassador's statement as very interesting but at the same time fully supported the international sanctions. In 2009, the North Korea women's national football team were denied visas needed to enter Norway to compete against the country. During 2014 the new Norwegian ambassador in Seoul, Torbjørn Holthe, repeated his predecessor's visit to Kaesong. It was reported in 2015 that the Norwegian company AquaGen, part of the EW Group, were selling salmon roe to the North Korean government, for use in aquaculture.

== See also ==
- Foreign relations of North Korea
- Foreign relations of Norway
