= Namibia–North Korea relations =

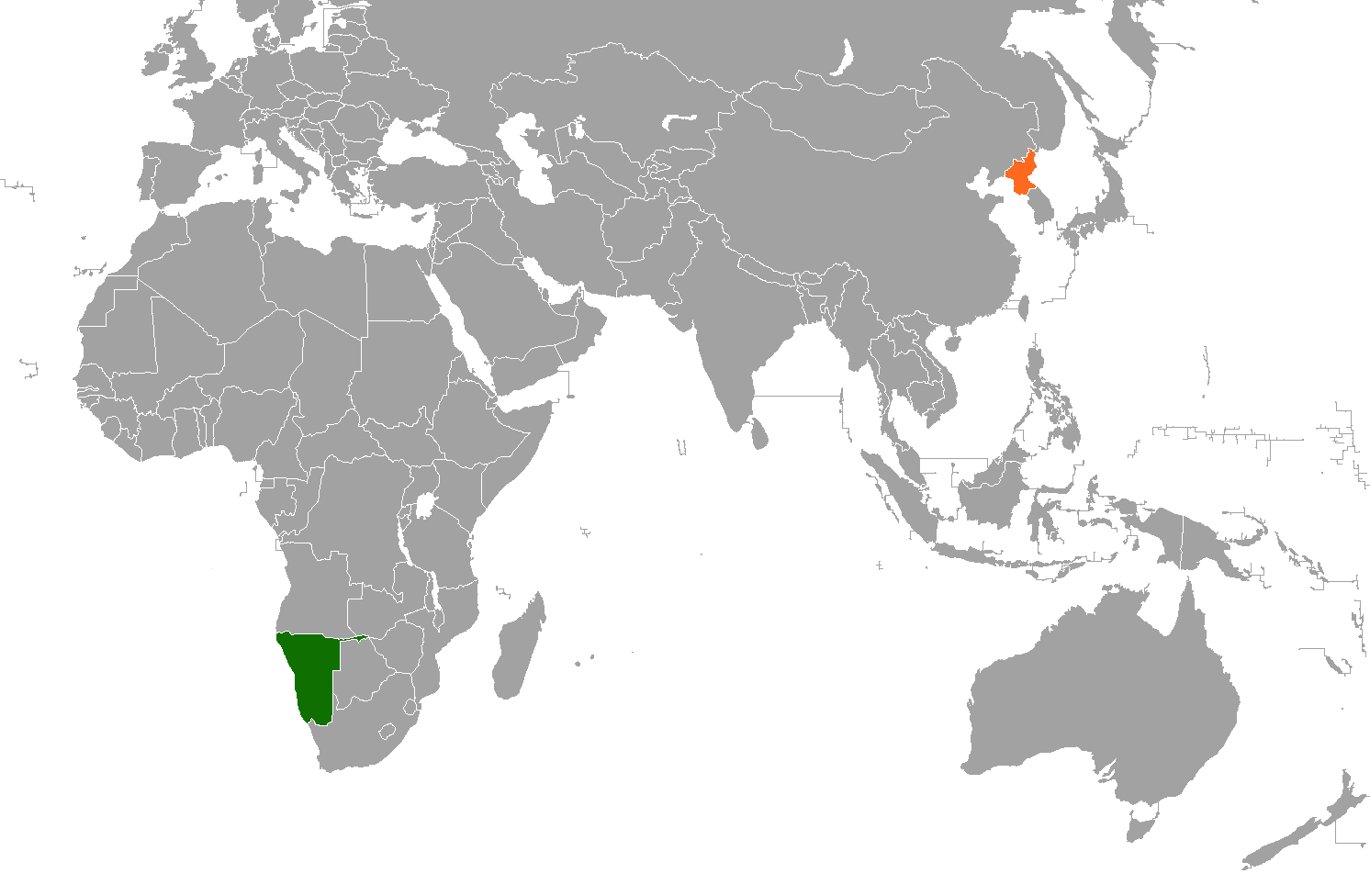

- Namibia: North Korea

Namibia–North Korea relations refers to the current and historical relationship between Namibia and the Democratic People's Republic of Korea (DPRK). Neither country maintains an embassy in the other's capital, although the DPRK formerly had one in Windhoek, which closed down in 1994.

== History ==
During the Namibian War of Independence, the DPRK provided significant support for the People's Liberation Army of Namibia (PLAN), the armed wing of the South West Africa People's Organization (SWAPO). Like many other pro-Soviet countries during the Cold War, the DPRK provided material aid to PLAN, and from 1965 onwards many SWAPO members went to Pyongyang to receive military training.

Relations have remained close after Namibia's independence in 1990. The country's first President, Sam Nujoma, was especially close to the DPRK. In 1992, he received the Order of the National Flag, a high DPRK decoration. Mansudae Overseas Projects, a DPRK construction company, has been behind several expensive projects in Namibia – among them Heroes' Acre, a war memorial opened in 2002 in Windhoek. The physical features of the statue of the Unknown Soldier reportedly closely resemble those of Nujoma. The company is also behind renovations to Nujoma's private home, as well as several other major projects – among them the Windhoek Independence Memorial, the State House of Namibia, and an independence museum also featuring a statue of President Nujoma.

Nujoma's successor, President Hifikepunye Pohamba, likewise remained close to the DPRK. In 2008 Kim Yong-nam, Chairman of the Presidium of the Supreme People's Assembly, visited Namibia and met with the President. Several agreements between the two countries were signed, to strengthen among other things bilateral co-operation on trade, commerce, transport, energy and defence. Following the death of Kim Jong-il in 2011, the Namibian government stated that his death would not affect Namibian-North Korean relations. In 2012, it was reported that Namibia had contracted the DPRK to build thirteen "mini-state houses" in each of the country's regions for President Pohamba, a hugely expensive move which faced immediate criticism. In 2016, it was confirmed that military co-operation was continuing.

== See also ==
- Foreign relations of Namibia
- Foreign relations of North Korea
