= The Gambia–North Korea relations =

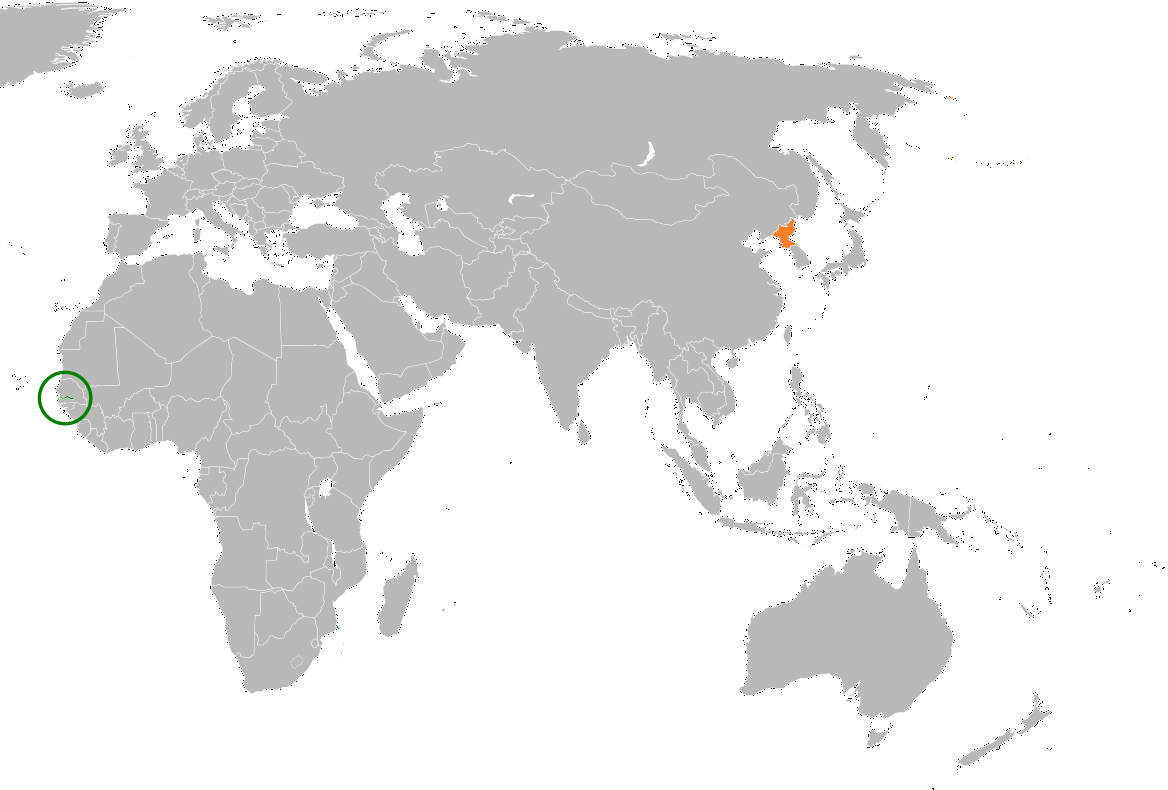

- Gambia: North Korea

The Gambia–North Korea relations refers to the current and historical relationship between The Gambia and the Democratic People's Republic of Korea (DPRK), known as North Korea in the Western World. Hong Son-phy is the accredited ambassador to Banjul.

== History ==
President Dawda Jawara established relations with the DPRK in March 1973, having first reassured South Korea that the move – in line with the country's non-aligned policies – would not interfere with ties to Seoul. A Gambian delegation visited both Koreas later the same year – the tour of DPRK strained the Gambian delegates, who described the "incessant period of political education on the Korean unification problem from the ideological perspective of North Korean officials" they had to go through as tiring. In Joint Communiques signed at the end of both visits, the Gambia expressed its full support for a peaceful reunification of the peninsula without outside involvement. A DPRK mission was subsequently opened in Banjul in July 1975, and the country contributed 203,235 Gambian dalasi towards drought relief.

The DPRK had developed non-governmental ties with the country prior to diplomatic recognition. In 1967, the Gambia Labour Union – the country's first trade union, which generally opposed militant strikes – affiliated with the pro-Soviet World Federation of Trade Unions, and soon also established ties with the DPRK government, in both cases in order to procure funding. In the same period the Korean–Gambian Friendship Association was formed. The journalist and politician Melvin Benoni Jones served as its president for some time, advocating closer ties between The Gambia and both the DPRK and the Soviet Union.

According to the retired Lt. Col. Samsudeen Sarr's autobiography, the Gambian defence ministry hosted an official delegation to Pyongyang in October 1996, visiting among other places the Kumsusan Palace of the Sun. The delegation asked to meet with Kim Jong Il, but were denied doing so, ostensibly because the leader was in mourning following the death of his father Kim Il Sung in 1994. DPRK negotiators declined a proposed military cooperation plan, demanding payment from the Gambians in hard cash and in United States dollars. The DPRK did however agree to dispatch a team of karate martial arts instructors to provide the military of The Gambia with self-defence training.

Kim Yong-nam, Chairman of the Presidium of the Supreme People's Assembly, made a three-day visit to The Gambia in April 2010, meeting with President Yahya Jammeh, Vice President Isatou Njie-Saidy and other prominent politicians. Multiple statements about the shared interests, mutual values and warm historical friendship between the two countries were issued.

After being accredited as ambassador to The Gambia in July 2014 and meeting with national leaders, Hong Son-phy stated that his country intended to cooperate with The Gambia on the subjects of agriculture, education, fisheries, public health and construction. In December 2014, The Gambia joined nineteen other United Nations member countries in voting against referring the DPRK to the International Criminal Court.

Under the government of President Yahya Jammeh, The Gambia has sometimes been referred to as the "North Korea of Africa" or similar terms, expressions which unfavourably compare the human rights situation and political structure in the two countries.

== See also ==
- Foreign relations of The Gambia
- Foreign relations of North Korea
