= Pak Tong-chun =

North Korean diplomat (born 1942)

- Hangul: 박동춘
- Hanja: 朴東春
- RR: Bak Dongchun
- MR: Pak Tongch'un

Pak Tong-chun (Korean pronunciation: [pak̚.t͈oŋ.tsʰun] or [pak̚] [toŋ.tsʰun]; born 1942) is a North Korean diplomat. He has served in postings in France (1998), Cuba (2000, 2004) and Venezuela (2003) as well as Belize (2002). He was also Vice Minister of Foreign Affairs from 1998 to 2000.

Pak's first international appointment was as vice director of the International Affairs Division of the North Korean Red Cross Society, in 1985. He went on to become representative to UNESCO in 1992.

== See also ==
- Politics of North Korea
