= North Korea–Philippines relations =

- North Korea: Philippines

North Korea–Philippines relations relates to the bilateral relations between North Korea and the Philippines.

The Philippines has a non-resident ambassador in Beijing and North Korea has representation through its embassy in Bangkok and resident embassy in Hanoi.

== History ==
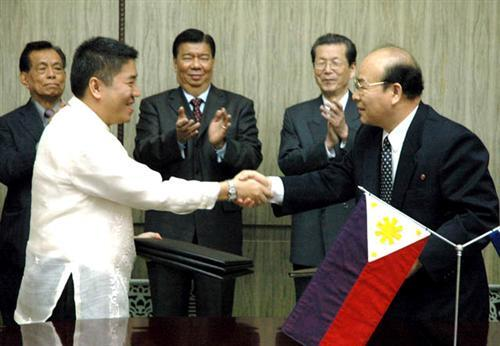
Ambeth Ocampo and Mun Jae-choi shake hands after the signing of the DPRK Cultural Cooperation Agreement in 2006

=== Early years ===
During the Korean War, the Philippines allied with South Korea, against North Korea.

Efforts to establish formal ties between the two countries began as early as the 1970s, but such efforts saw no significant development by the 1980s. Factors hindering such efforts include the Philippines' traditional anti-communist foreign policy at that time as well as suspicions that North Korea had been supporting the Communist Party of the Philippines and its armed wing, the New People's Army (NPA). Limited North Korean support to the NPA was alleged by a 1990 report of the Patterns of Global Terrorism by the United States Department of State.

=== Formal relations establishment ===
In 1991, future Filipino Foreign Affairs Secretary Domingo L. Siazon, Jr. visited North Korea as a guest of President Kim Il Sung.

In 1998, as chair of the ASEAN Regional Forum (ARF), the Philippines initiated the process of admitting North Korea as a member of the forum but the latter had stated that Southeast Asian countries, such as Brunei and the Philippines, should first establish formal relations with North Korea before it would join the ARF.

The foreign ministers of the two countries met in New York in September 1999, in the sidelines of the UN General Assembly, to discuss the improvement of bilateral ties. This was followed by a meeting in Colombia, during the Non-Aligned Movement Conference in April 2000, where they agreed in principle to establish diplomatic relations.

The two countries formally established diplomatic relations on July 12, 2000, upon the signing of a joint communiqué by now Filipino Foreign Affairs Secretary Siazon and North Korean Ambassador to Thailand, Jo In-chol, in a ceremony conducted at the Department of Foreign Affairs office in Pasay, Metro Manila, Philippines. This followed more than 20 years of negotiations. The Philippines was one of the last Asian countries to establish official diplomatic relations with North Korea. North Korea within the same month joined the Asean Regional Forum.

=== Further development ===
It was also reported in the early 2010s, that North Korea proposed to establish a resident embassy in Manila, which Philippine officials rejected. The rejection was reportedly due to Philippine authorities' suspicion on North Korean diplomats as they were deemed to have a reputation to conduct "extra-diplomatic activities" such as smuggling and counterfeiting in other foreign countries. Philippine Foreign Secretary Siazon insisted that North Korea had never made such request. However, he remained open to the expansion of diplomatic ties between the two countries.

The Philippines, as an ally of South Korea and the United States, remains concerned and continues to condemn North Korea's nuclear missile tests which is considered to be in violation of United Nations Security Council resolutions banning North Korea to use ballistic technology in any purpose.

In March 2016, in compliance with United Nations (UN) sanctions, the Philippines impounded a North Korean ship, Jin Teng, but found no explosives or banned substances. Several weeks later, another ship, Theresa Begonia, was impounded and again no banned substances were found.

== Economic relations ==
According to the Philippine Department of Trade and Industry, the primary exports of the Philippines to North Korea were bananas, computers and integrated circuit boards.

In 2017, the Philippines was reportedly the third largest trading partner of North Korea according to the defector-led & run Daily NK web portal, next to India and China with the latter accounting for 90 percent of North Korea's trade.

Trade relations were suspended by the Philippines in September 2017 to comply with the United Nations Security Council Resolution which called for further sanctions against North Korea over its July 2017 missile tests.
