= Grenada–North Korea relations =

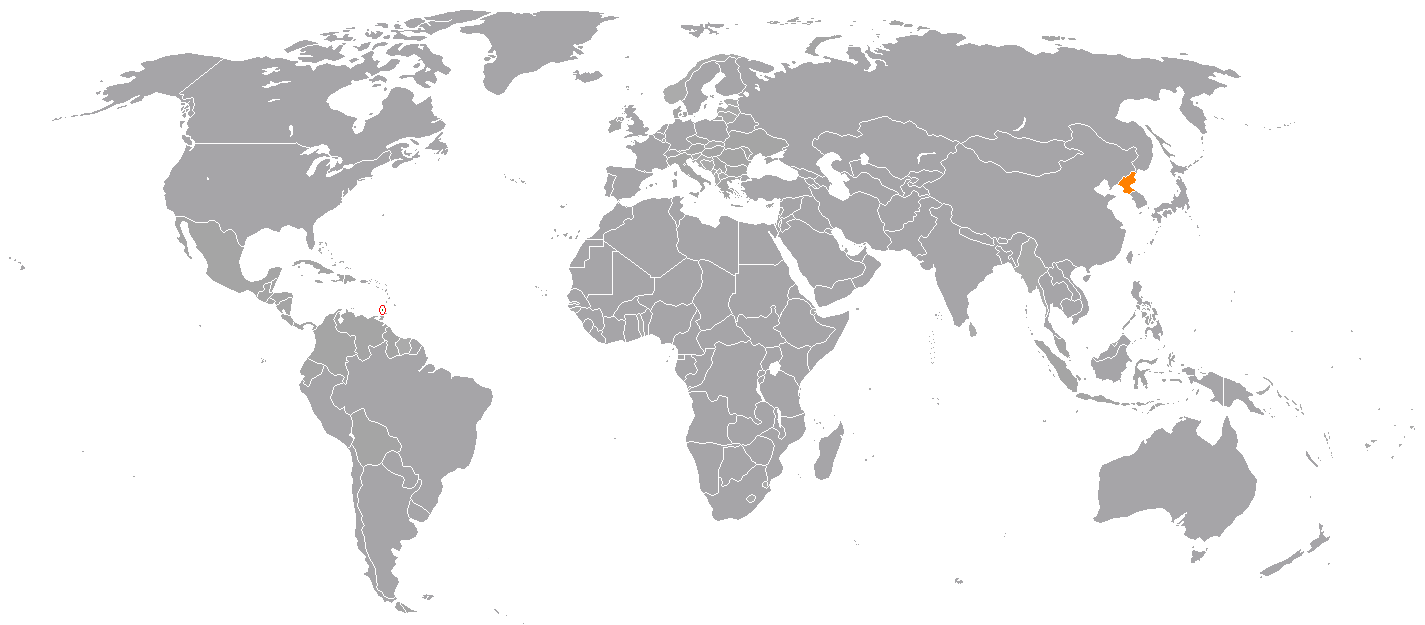

- Grenada: North Korea

Grenada–North Korea relations refers to bilateral relations between the People's Revolutionary Government of Grenada and the Democratic People’s Republic of Korea. The People's Revolutionary Government of Grenada and the Democratic People’s Republic of Korea established full diplomatic relations on Wednesday 9 May 1979. The two countries' diplomatic relationship ended in January 1985.

== History ==
On April 14, 1983, the People's Revolutionary Government of Grenada and the Democratic People’s Republic of Korea signed an agreement for the Democratic People’s Republic of Korea to offer free military assistance to the People’s Revolutionary Government of Grenada. The agreement was in return for weapons and ammunitions that were worth US$12 million.

During the United States invasion of Grenada, North Korea sent 24 troops to fight against the United States and the Caribbean Peace Force troops.

== Bilateral agreements ==
Date	Agreement name	Law ref. number	Note
14 April 1983	Military Agreement		
