= Guinea-Bissau–North Korea relations =

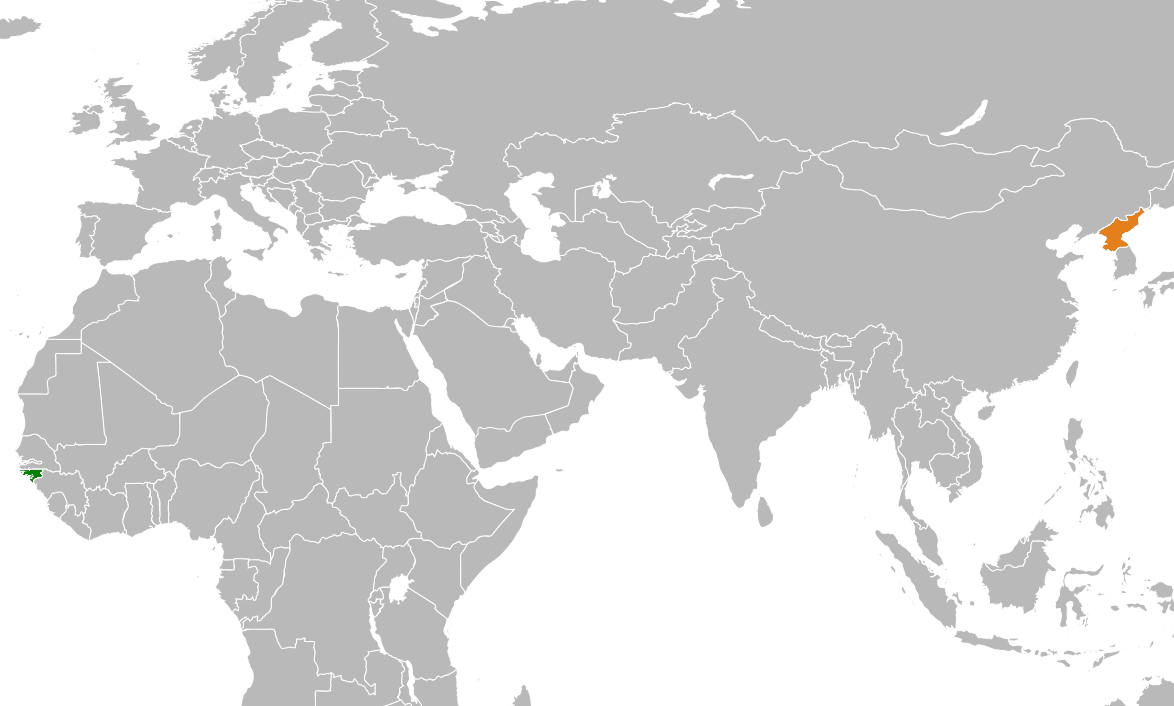

- Guinea-Bissau: North Korea

Guinea-Bissau–North Korea relations refers to the current and historical relationship between Guinea-Bissau and the Democratic People's Republic of Korea (DPRK), commonly known as North Korea. Neither country maintains an embassy in their respective capitals.

== History ==
During the Cold War, North Korea – like many other states aligned with the Soviet Union, or in general opposition to colonialism – provided military, political and diplomatic aid to the African Party for the Independence of Guinea and Cape Verde (PAIGC), the movement fighting Portugal in the Guinea-Bissau War of Independence. Before independence, Amílcar Cabral and other members of the PAIGC traveled to North Korea, China, and Japan and met with Kim Il Sung in North Korea. Following independence, Guinea-Bissau subsequently established diplomatic relations with North Korea on 16 March 1974. Guinea-Bissau was one of many African countries to recognize North Korea but withhold recognition from South Korea in the mid-1970s. Formerly, North Korea maintained an embassy in Bissau.

In 1977, a few years prior to being overthrown, Guinea-Bissau's first independent leader – President Luís Cabral – visited Pyongyang, meeting Kim Il Sung together with his wife. On his 70th birthday, in 1982, Kim Il Sung was awarded the Amílcar Cabral Order by the Bissau-Guinean government.

== See also ==
- Foreign relations of Guinea-Bissau
- Foreign relations of North Korea
