= Ghana–North Korea relations =

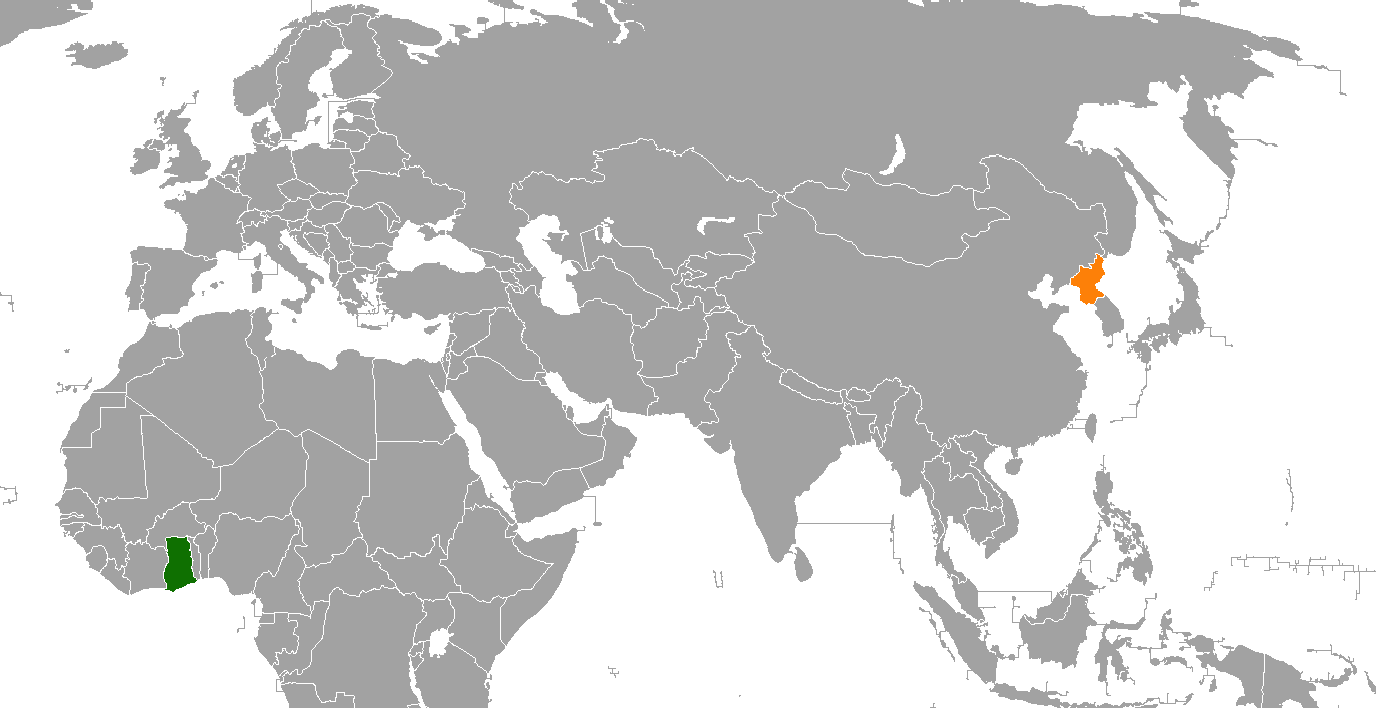

- Ghana: North Korea

Envoy
- N/A: North Korean ambassador to Ghana Kil Mun-yong

Ghana and North Korea established diplomatic relations in 1964.

Even before diplomatic relations were established, Ghana had campaigned, along with other African nations, for recognition of North Korea as an observer in the United Nations (UN). Trade relations between the two countries preceded diplomatic relations. North Korea's leader Kim Il Sung shared much in common politically with Ghana's Kwame Nkrumah. After Nkrumah was ousted, North Korea ended up in a diplomatic spat with Ghana, which accused it of training anti-government rebels. By the late-1960s, North Korea was again supporting Ghana as an anti-imperialist force in Africa. In the 1980s, Ghana's Provisional National Defence Council successfully sought aid from North Korea and other socialist countries in order to be more independent from Western powers.

There was a North Korean embassy in Ghana until it was closed down in 1998. The current North Korean ambassador to Ghana is Kil Mun-yong. Trade between the two countries consists mainly of North Korean exports of cement and Ghanaian cocoa, gemstones, and pearls. There is a Korea–Ghana Friendship Association for cultural exchange.

== History ==
In the aftermath of the Korean War, South Korea was granted observer status in the United Nations (UN), but North Korea was not. From the late-1950s to the 1980s a block of Third World countries, including Ghana rallied to condemn the one-sided recognition. In 1973, North Korea was admitted to the UN as an observer.

A tour by North Korean officials to sign trade deals with several West African countries, including Ghana, took place in the summer of 1961. This was before the establishment of formal relations on an ambassadorial level, which happened on 28 December 1964.

In the 1960s, North Korea's isolationist policies were viewed favorably in Ghana that professed a similar stance. Kim Il Sung, the leader of North Korea, shared much in common politically with Kwame Nkrumah of Ghana, although the latter never went quite as far in terms of state control over the economy, society, and culture of his country. In July 1966, after the Nkrumah administration had been overthrown, Ghana temporarily terminated relations with North Korea when it uncovered that North Korea was training anti-government guerrillas in Ghana. Similar diplomatic incidents involving North Korea took place in other African countries as well with comparable results.

By 1968, North Korea again voiced support for Ghana. In July, Kim Il Sung launched a slogan: "Cutting off the Limbs of U.S. Imperialism Everywhere" in an effort to establish himself as a leader of the world communist movement. Kim envisioned that Latin American countries could cut off one "arm" of the United States, while African countries such as Ghana would sever the other one.

In 1983, North Korea initiated an agricultural project in Ghana as foreign aid. Around that time, Ghana's Provisional National Defence Council was actively seeking for aid from socialist countries in order to diminish its dependence on Western powers. An agreement on cultural exchange was signed for 1993–1995.

When Ghana established full diplomatic relations with South Korea in 1977, it became one of a limited number of countries that have relations with both North and South Korea.

There was a North Korean embassy in Ghana until it was closed down in 1998. The North Korean ambassador to Ghana since January 2001 is Kil Mun-yong.

In 2006, Ghana voted as a non-permanent member of the United Nations Security Council in favor of its Resolution 1718 which imposed sanctions against North Korea. In 2018, Ghana expressed its support for the political process to improve relations between North and South Korea in the midst of the 2017–18 North Korea crisis.

== Trade ==
Ghana has mostly run a deficit in its trade with North Korea, meaning that Ghana is a source of foreign currencies to North Korea. In 2015, North Korea was Ghana's 77th biggest trade partner with $6.8 million in trade. Ghana imports mostly cement from North Korea. It exports mainly cocoa, gemstones, and pearls, but also precious metals.

== See also ==
- Foreign relations of Ghana
- Foreign relations of North Korea
