= North Korea–Tanzania relations =

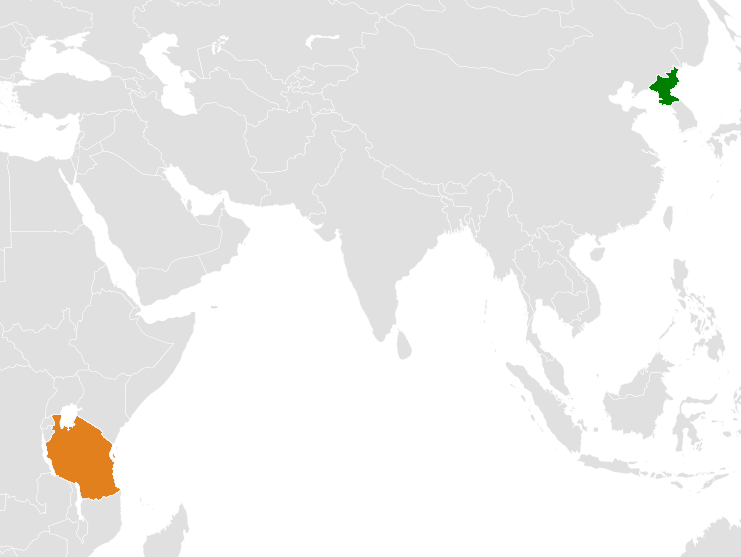

- North Korea: Tanzania

North Korea–Tanzania relations (Korean: 탄자니아-조선민주주의인민공화국 관계) are bilateral relations between Democratic People's Republic of Korea and Tanzania. Tanzania and North Korea have a long history of military co-operation, going back to their mutual support for anti-imperialist struggle in southern Africa during the Cold War.

== Incidents ==
North Korea has provided military aid to African nations since the early 1970s to assist African nations in their liberation struggle. In 2014, both Uganda and Tanzania were accused by the United Nations over various arms deals with North Korea. The UN claimed Tanzania had traded in arms illegally, breaking the embargo placed upon North Korea. Experts claimed that 18 military technicians were involved in refurbishing and maintaining Tanzania Air Force F-7 jets and other military aircraft. Barack Obama highlighted this point during his visit to Tanzania; Tanzania's foreign minister denied any arms deals with North Korea, but said that using North Korean technicians was not in violation of the UN sanctions.

== Trade ==
Trade between Tanzania and North Korea is not substantial. Tanzania only exports small amounts of coffee to North Korea and North Korea exports small amounts of medical instruments or pharmaceuticals.

=== Medical clinics ===
North Korea has operated around 13 medical clinics in the country of which two were closed down. With the two clinics closed down, the government found various irregularities with the clinics. Doctors were not licensed and they were performing unlicensed medical practices.

== Diplomatic missions ==
North Korea maintains an embassy in Dar es Salaam which is accredited to all neighboring nations except Uganda and Kenya.

The Tanzanian embassy in China is accredited to maintain relations with North Korea.
