= Libya–North Korea relations =

- North Korea: Libya

Libya–North Korea relations (Korean: 리비아-조선민주주의인민공화국 관계, Arabic: العلاقات بين ليبيا وكوريا الشمالية) are relations between North Korea and Libya. North Korea established formal diplomatic relations with Muammar Gaddafi regime in Libya in 1974. The North Korean government maintains an embassy in Tripoli. In the 1970s and 1980s, the Libyan government under Muammar Gaddafi established close ties with the North Korean government and purchased a significant amount of North Korea's weaponry.

== History ==
=== 1974–2011: Military-nuclear cooperation ===
Range of Libyan ballistic missiles if Libya were to acquire North Korean missiles in 1996.

From 1974 until 2011, relations between the two States were marked by a cordial understanding, North Korea in particular supplying the Libya with uranium hexafluoride, a compound used for the enrichment of uranium and fuel for nuclear reactors and nuclear weapons according to a The Pentagon report.

A number of North Korean workers were also present in the country. North Korean exports to Libya included military equipment such as Scud C missiles with a range of 550km. Libyan government is also in favor of the acquisition of Rodong-1 (Hwasong-7) Medium-range ballistic missiles and even long-range missiles from North Korea due to the arms embargo imposed by the United Nations, to use them against possible the United States and NATO targets in the event of Western threats. The United States officials then denounce a "cooperation between North Korea and Libya". North Korea was one of the most important arms suppliers to the Libyan Arab Jamahiriya, along with the Soviet Union.

On 19 December 2003, Libya finally agreed to end its weapon of mass destruction program, destroy its ballistic missiles with a range of over 300km / 500 kg payload and authorize immediate inspections of the United Nations.

=== Libyan civil war and the fall of Muammar Gaddafi ===
In 2011, as the First Libyan Civil War broke out, North Korean conventional weapons were found by rebels from the National Transitional Council, including rockets, anti-aircraft weapons and anti-personnel mines. On 24 March 2011, North Korean government suggested to Libya in a statement that "it should have kept its nuclear program." The dismantling of Libyan weapons of mass destruction has indeed made possible the military intervention of NATO according to some analysts. On 12 May 2011, the North Korean embassy in Tripoli was reportedly damaged in a NATO raid targeting a nearby Libyan military complex. NATO refuted shortly after targeting the embassy.

North Korea has not recognized the authority of the rebels and has banned its nationals working in Libya (around 200) from returning to North Korea for fear of the popular revolt spreading.
