= Finland–North Korea relations =

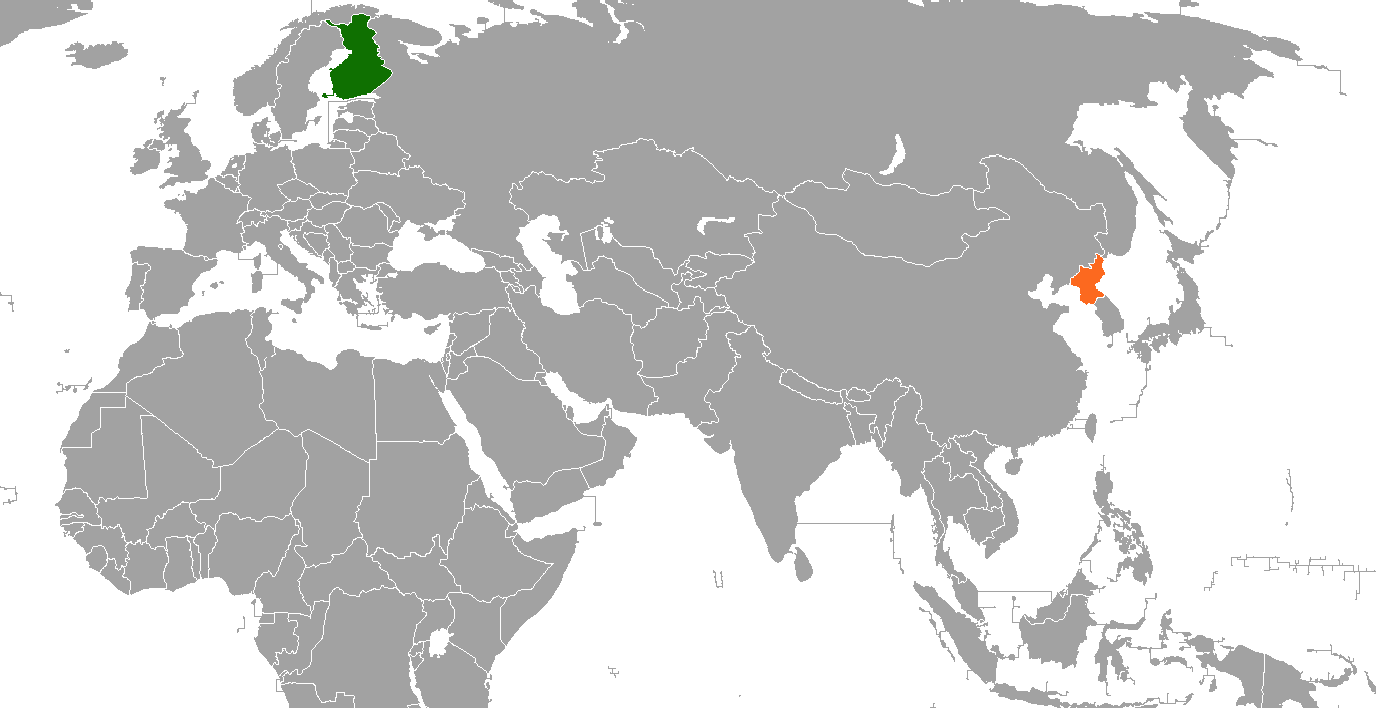

- Finland: North Korea

Diplomatic mission
- Embassy of Sweden, Pyongyang: Embassy of Finland, Seoul

Envoy
- Non-resident ambassador Eero Suominen (accreditation pending): Non-resident ambassador Kang Yong-dok

Finland–North Korea relations are bilateral relations between Finland and North Korea.

In the 1970s, Finland made a decision to have diplomatic relations with both North and South Korea. This mirrored the contemporary policy of relations with both East and West Germany. Finland extended formal diplomatic recognition to North Korea on 13 April 1973. The countries have had formal diplomatic relations since 1 June 1973. Relations were sometimes close until the 1990s, after which correspondences have significantly diminished.

North Korea had an embassy in Finland from 1978 until it closed it down in 1998 for economic reasons. North Korea maintained a fair amount of its relations with the European Union through the embassy, which made Finland one of its priorities. Kim Pyong-il, a son of the country's president, Kim Il Sung, was chosen as the last resident ambassador. This was either to highlight the importance of relations with Finland or to move him out of Pyongyang in order to prevent a power struggle with his half-brother Kim Jong Il, who succeeded Kim Il Sung. Nowadays, North Korea is represented by a non-resident ambassador in the Embassy of North Korea in Stockholm, Sweden, who is currently Kang Yong-dok. His Finnish counterpart is Eero Suominen, although he is yet to be accredited.

Various diplomatic incidents have taken place over the years. In the 1970s, North Korean diplomats were found to run a smuggling ring in Finland and the other Nordic countries as part of North Korea's illicit activities to obtain foreign currencies. In 1983, the North Korean ambassador tried to bribe the Finnish prime minister Johannes Virolainen. In 2007, Finnish Customs used teargas on two North Korean diplomats who refused to cooperate.

In the 1970s, North Korea purchased two paper machines from Finland for 30 million euros. The debt has never been paid back. Trade between the two countries has been "virtually non-existent" since the 2000s.

There is a friendship association to promote Finnish–North Korean relations in Finland called Finland–Korea Association. Likewise, North Korea has its Korea–Finland Association. Pentecostal charity Fida International and the Finnish Red Cross operate in the country.

== History ==
Question: With how many countries does the Democratic People's Republic of Korea maintain diplomatic relations? If the Republic of Finland wants to establish diplomatic relations with your country, what would be your attitude on this matter?
Answer: The DPRK has established diplomatic relations with eleven socialist countries including the Soviet Union and the People's Republic of China and is promoting friendly cooperative relations with them. In addition, the DPRK has economic and cultural relations with a number of Asian and African nations. The DPRK, which since its very inception has consistently pursued a peace-loving foreign policy, endeavours to promote friendly relations with all countries, irrespective of their social systems, in accordance with the principles of peaceful coexistence. We are ready to establish good relations with all countries which want to form friendly relations with our country.

— Kim Il Sung, 1958

North Korea pursued relations with Finland already in the late 1950s. Finland, however, could not agree to the establishment of formal relations with a divided state of the Cold War. Formation of relations culminated in Finnish diplomatic recognition of North Korea on 13 April 1973, and the establishment of formal diplomatic relations on 1 June 1973. Until the 1990s, the two had sometimes close relations. In recent times, the two countries have not had important relations. The last time that political consultations were held was in 2005. Nowadays, the two countries maintain normal diplomatic relations, but they are not particularly close. Finland has often condemned those actions of North Korea that it perceives as threats to international peace and security.

=== Establishment of trade relations, recognition, and diplomatic relations ===
I wish to express to you and the government of Finland my deep thanks for the support your government has given to the policy of independent and peaceful reunification of the government of the Democratic People's Republic of Korea and the struggle of the Korean people to implement it.

— Kim Il Sung in a letter to Urho Kekkonen, 1973
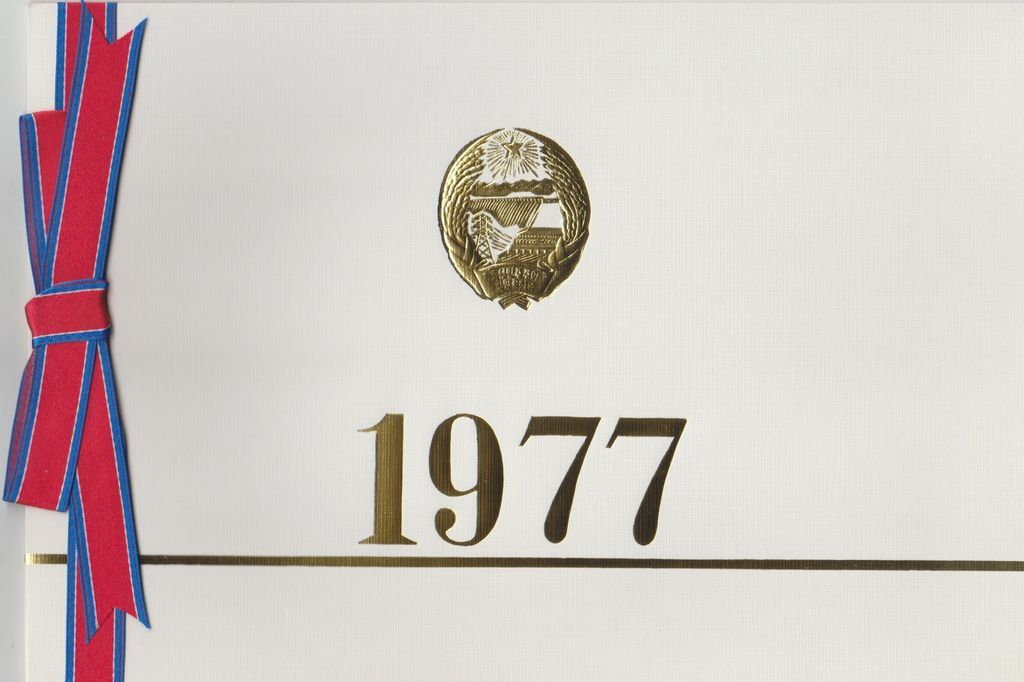
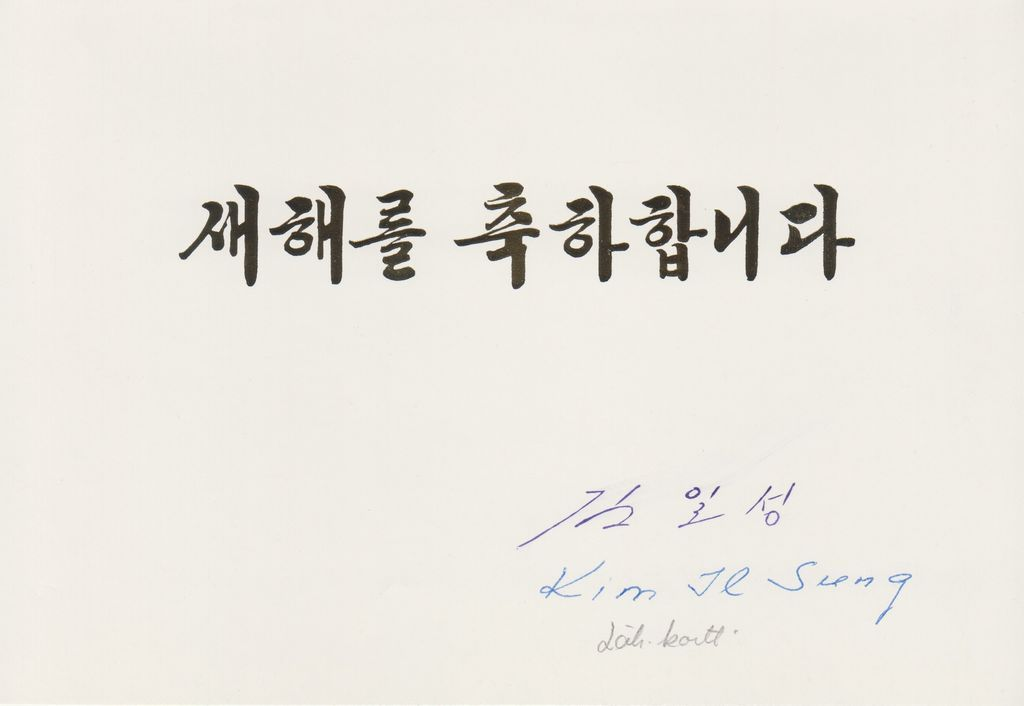
A Christmas card sent to President Urho Kekkonen by Kim Il Sung

A bilateral trade agreement was signed on 9 October 1969, and a North Korean trade office was established in Helsinki in January 1971. In the 1970s, Finland maintained a prudent foreign policy toward any divided states. Like East and West Germany, North and South Korea fell under this policy. Consequentially, Finland had to let South Korea establish a trade office in the capital as well. It also entailed that Finland would have to establish formal diplomatic relations with both states. The impetus came in November 1972, when Finland recognized both German states. The following month, North Korean diplomats petitioned the Finnish government to pursue recognition of North Korea as well. Finland simultaneously recognized the two Korean states on 13 April 1973. Diplomatic relations with North Korea were established two months later, on 1 June and with South Korea slightly later on 24 August. Finland became the second Western European country, after Sweden, to establish relations with the North. Because of the policy, however, Finland recognized South Korea later than the other Nordic countries. The Korean question continued to be addressed at the United Nations in the 1970s. Kim Il Sung apparently considered Finland to have a role to play and petitioned him twice by personal letters in 1973. In the 1970s, Finland maintained closer ties with North than South Korea. The tide began to turn in the late 1970s because of unpaid debts and diplomatic incidents. By the mid-1980s, Finland was favoring South Korea over the North, although Kim still described the ties as "cordial" in 1985. Finland was establishing an embassy in Seoul, and let North Korea know that there would be no Finnish embassy in Pyongyang until the country cleaned up its diplomatic act and paid its debts.

=== Illicit activities ===
In 1976, North Korean diplomats were discovered to run extensive smuggling of cigarettes, liquor, and illegal drugs in Finland, Sweden, Norway, and Denmark as part of North Korea's illicit activities to earn currency. In Finland, this included trafficking drugs and alcohol. The drug sales apparently did not go as planned because the North Koreans lacked know-how in drugs. Alcohol wares were imported from the Soviet Union as well as Stockholm and also purchased at diplomatic rates from Alko. Finnish police surveiled the embassy and its staff to expose these activities, and even broke into diplomatic premises to obtain proof. The case culminated in a joint police operation in the Nordic countries and a car chase in Helsinki. Chargé d'affaires Chang Dae-hi and three other diplomats were declared persona non grata. Initially refusing to leave, Finland stipulated resorting to cutting off electricity and water from the diplomatic premises. The situation resolved when the diplomats eventially left and were replaced by four new ones on the same day. The incident proved not only damaging to the reputation of North Korea but also put the Finnish authorities in a difficult position because North Korea still remained a diplomatic priority. No espionage component could however be found in the North Korean operations.

The biggest blow to diplomatic relations took place in 1983, when the North Korean ambassador, Yu Jae-han tried to bribe the Finnish prime minister Johannes Virolainen with $5,000. The incident resulted in the diplomat being announced persona non grata. North Korean diplomats have also reportedly tried to sell pornography in Finland. In the 1990s, a diplomat once again was suspected of illegal alcohol sales, and another one was caught trying to exchange counterfeit dollars.

In 2007, North Korea issued a diplomatic note of dissatisfaction with Finland after an incident concerning two North Korean diplomats. The diplomats headed to Stockholm were aboard the train from Moscow to Helsinki when Finnish Customs officials had to use tear gas after they refused to cooperate. The men had refused to show their train tickets and their diplomatic passports lacked the appropriate annex for passing through Finland, where they had not been accredited. Only after the Finnish police had determined that there was North Korean diplomatic personnel in Finland to meet the men and escort them to Sweden was it determined that they were entitled to diplomatic immunity as passing by diplomats. The North Korean note accused Finland of human rights violations and the diplomats being bitten by canine police.

North Korea has attempted to import dual-use technology suitable for weapons of mass destruction from Finland.

== Diplomatic representation ==
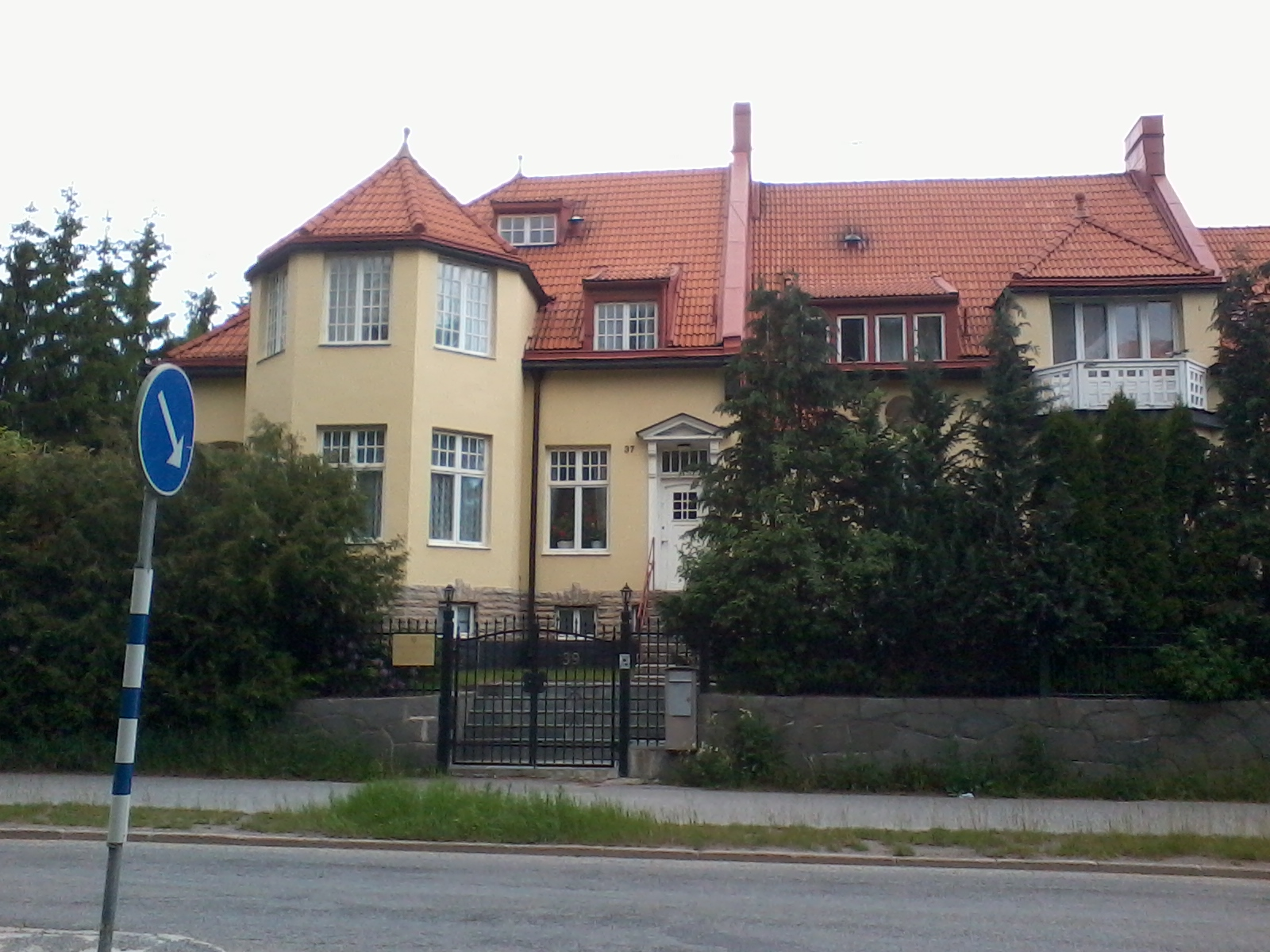
Embassy of North Korea, Stockholm

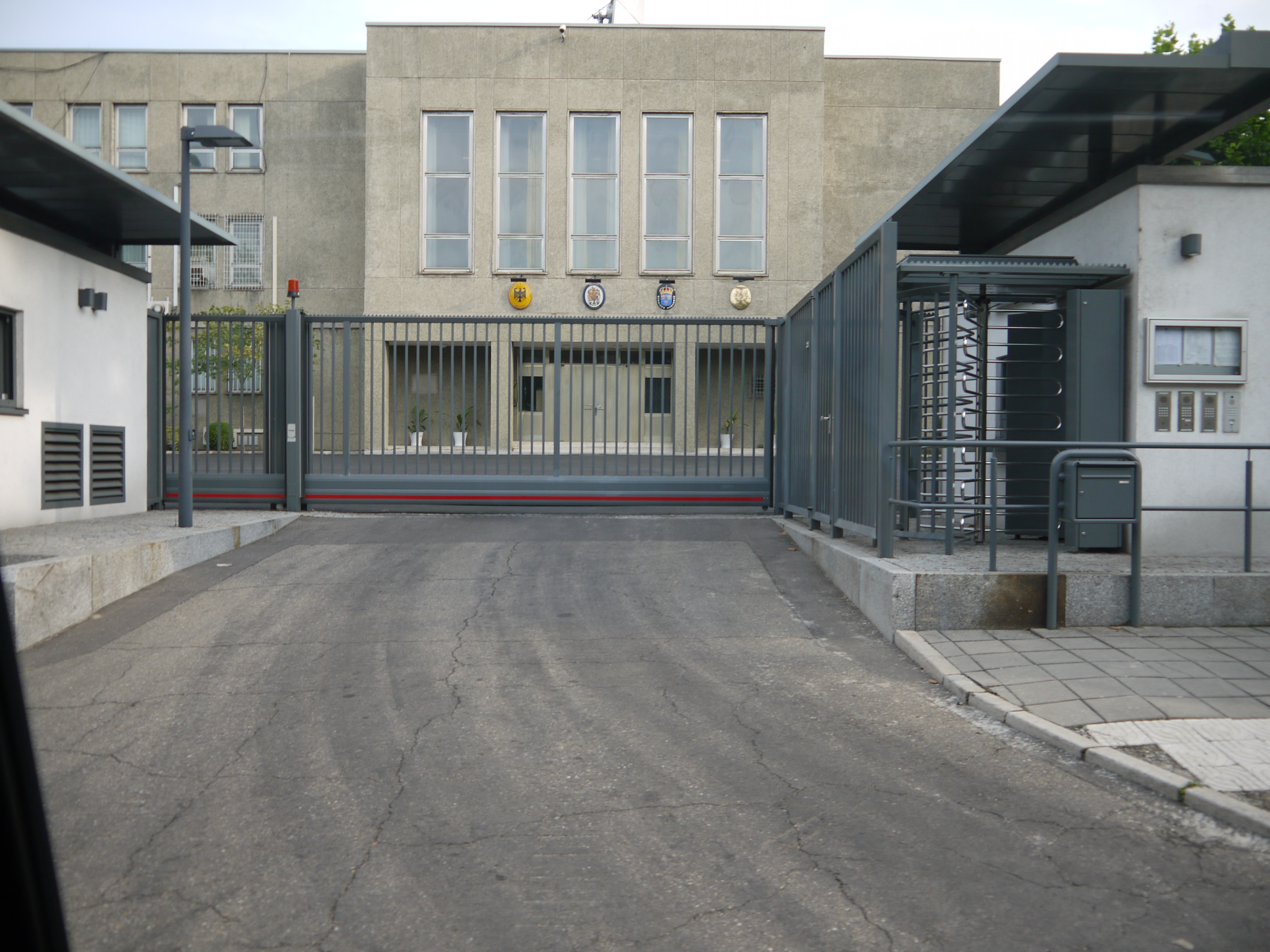
Embassy of Sweden, Pyongyang

North Korea maintained an embassy in Finland from 1978 until it closed it down in 1998. In addition to the embassy, located at Kulosaaren puistotie 32 in the Kulosaari district of Helsinki, North Korea maintained an official residence for the ambassador, in the Tammisalo district of the capital since spring 1994. The embassy was closed down "for economic reasons". The properties were sold and the embassy subsequently demolished.

The last ambassador before a temporary diplomat was Kim Il Sung's son Kim Pyong-il, who had been accredited on 18 March 1994. Kim's predecessor, Choe Sang-bom, had served for about six months, until he reportedly fell ill and left the country in December 1993. However, it could also have been that Choe was recalled for political reasons. Before the shutdown, North Korea used to run much of its relations with the European Union through its embassy in Finland, and the Finnish Foreign Ministry assessed that North Korea had "invested a lot" in its relations with Finland. Kim Pyong-il, in particular, was thought to have been chosen as ambassador in order to raise the profile of Finnish relations. On the other hand, Kim was speculated to have been placed in Finland to be out of the way of a potential power struggle following the anticipated succession of his half-brother Kim Jong Il to the country's leadership. Kim Pyong-il was called back to Pyongyang on 22 April 1994. The departure was sudden and North Korea failed to inform the Finnish Foreign Ministry. This sparked speculation that Kim Il Sung was tormented by doubts about Kim Jong Il's ability to succeed him and maintain the Kim family regime, and that he still viewed Kim Pyong-il as a potential successor. Kim Il-sung died on 9 July 1994, and Kim Pyong-il returned to Helsinki as soon as the funeral was over and told the Finnish press that Kim Jong Il was designated as the successor decades before.

In the 1990s, Finland was a strategic partner due to its traditional role in-between Western and Eastern countries following North Korea's soured relations with major powers due to its nuclear weapons program. At the time, it was reported that North Korea had also made a set of "unrealistic" commercial proposals to Finland. Since the embassy was shut down, North Korea has maintained relations with Finland through the Embassy of North Korea in Stockholm, Sweden. North Korea's ambassador to Sweden then acts as the non-resident ambassador to Finland and other Nordic countries.

Pak Kwang-cho was accredited as the ambassador to Finland on 22 January 2013. Pak, however, was called back to Pyongyang in December 2013 following the execution of his ally Jang Song-thaek. It is likely that Pak was imprisoned or executed. The current non-resident ambassador to Finland is Kang Yong-dok. In the North Korean Foreign Ministry, the person responsible for relations with Finland is the head of the Department of Northern Europe, with four staff members. As of 2017, the person is Pak Yun-sik. Finland is dealt with by the ministry's European Affairs Department 2.

Eero Suominen was appointed the ambassador to both Koreas in September 2016, but As of September 2017, he is yet to leave his letter of accreditation to the North Korean government. The ambassador is a non-resident one in the Embassy of Finland in Seoul, South Korea. Finnish nationals in North Korea may seek urgent assistance from the Embassy of North Korea, Stockholm. In the Finnish Foreign Ministry, relations with North Korea are handled by the Unit for Eastern Asia and Oceania, which is under the Department for the Americas and Asia.

=== Former representatives ===
==== Finnish ====
- Ambassador Veli Helenius 1973–1974
- Ambassador Martti Salomies 1974–1976
- Ambassador Pentti Suomela 1976–1984
- Ambassador Risto Hyvärinen 1984–1999
- Ambassador Arto Mansala 1989–1992
- Ambassador Ilkka Ristimäki 1992–

==== North Korean ====
- Chargé d'affaires by announcement Chog Sung-kyn 1973
- Chargé d'affaires by announcement Chang Dae-hi 1973
- Ambassador Han Jong-cho 1978–1979
- Ambassador Yu Jae-han 1979–1983
- Ambassador Li Nam-kyu 1984–1989
- Ambassador Ryo Sung-chol 1990–1993
- Ambassador Choe Sang-bom 1993–1994
- Ambassador Kim Pyong-il 1994–1997

== Inter-parliamentary relations ==
My understanding is that all, not just socialist countries, want to live as independent... Finland, too, wants to live as independent and that is why we are in the same position.

— Kim Il Sung, to a delegation of Finnish MPs, 1972

The first parliamentary visit to North Korea took place in 1972. The delegation that was led by Veikko J. Rytkönen (SKDL) and also included Lasse Lehtinen (SDP) and Pertti Salolainen (NCP) met with President Kim Il Sung.

In 1982, MP Sakari Knuuttila (SDP) and minister Veikko Saarto (SKDL) along with former Yleisradio director-general Eino S. Repo organized a conference for the "reunification" of Korea in Espoo, Finland prompted by North Korea. A North Korean delegation arrived to the conference but since there was no South Korean representation the conference was nothing short of a North Korean propaganda event.

In the past, a Finnish parliamentary committee, the Finnish-Korea friendship group (Suomi-Korea-ystävyysryhmä) was tasked with relations. The committee visited the country in 1997 to attend Day of the Sun celebrations and was heavily criticized for supporting the regime. The vice president of the committee, Matti Vähänäkki (SDP), alluded that reports of the North Korean famine were exaggerated. The trip also exceeded its budget.

Kim Il Sung was awarded the 75-year Anniversary Parliamentary Medal of Finland in 1981. In 1982, Kim's 70th birthday was attended by MP Veikko Saarto and Minister of Education Kalevi Kivistö (both SKDL) despite the government's intention to mark the occasion in a low-key fashion. Finns have gifted Kim Il Sung a reindeer pelt and a ryijy. A double cloth was gifted for Kim's 80th birthday in 1992. Kim's 80th birthday was attended by chairman of the Communist Workers' Party – For Peace and Socialism Timo Lahdenmäki and member of parliament Pekka Leppänen of the Left Alliance party. Gifts from Finland amount to more than the combined total of all other Northern European countries.

After the death of Kim Il-sung, within a week some 40 people had visited the North Korean embassy in Helsinki to express their condolences, including high-ranking government officials. Likewise, after the death of Kim Jong-il in 2011, Finnish member of parliament Kaj Turunen of the Finns Party motioned the parliament to observe a minute of silence "in remembrance of the Dear Leader Kim Jong-il", while his fellow party member Juho Eerola wished Kim Jong Un the providence of God. Both members of parliament were invited to a meeting with appreciative North Korean diplomats in Helsinki and were also invited to visit North Korea. In the past, North Korea sought to influence Finnish politicians a lot, but recent years have lacked enthusiasm.

== Trade relations ==
Bilateral trade between the countries is "virtually non-existent", especially since the 2000s, with occasional spikes. For instance, Finnish imports from North Korea increased 14,000 percent from 2010 to 2011 when trade included some 3,000 North Korean television sets assembled in the Kaesong Industrial Region along with other artifacts. In 2016 products worth of just 1,500 euros were exported from Finland to North Korea, while North Korean exports to Finland were valued at a little over 6,000 euros. Finland's main exports to North Korea have been cranes and dentistry equipment. A relatively high-value trade of 8,5 million euros worth of cranes to North Korea took place in 2013. In the 1970s, Finland imported mostly rice from North Korea.

Finland established a trade office in Pyongyang on 1 April 1974. At that time, relations were lobbied by Metex, an organization representing the interest of Finnish metal industries. It was thought that Finnish industries would get a boost from having a presence in North Korea early before Western European or other capitalist countries. The office was fully functioning in 1975. Finnish staff actively took part in social events in the capital because failure to show up could have been interpreted as protest. At the office, the staff was concerned about possible listening devices as it was known that North Koreans had personnel who knew Finnish. In 1972, North Korea had ordered paper machines and other machinery from Finland for over 30 million dollars. Providers included Rauma-Repola, Ahlstrom, Tampella, and Strömberg. At the time the investment was deemed safe, but it quickly ran into many troubles. The equipment was delivered but the payment was never made. Kim Il Sung also identified mining technology as a potential import.

In the 1970s, Finland sought actively for the debt to be paid and a court of arbitration in Moscow ruled in favor of the Finnish claims. North Korea still has a debt of more than 26 million dollars to the Finnish state and 6 million to Finnish enterprises. The Finnish state has for a long time expected no repayment, but in 2017 North Korea hinted that it was willing to fulfill its obligations. The trade office remains closed.

Finland enacts sanctions against North Korea because of the latter's nuclear weapons program.

== Non-governmental relations ==
I should like to take this opportunity to extend my warm greetings to the Finnish communists and the working class of Finland for their active support of the righteous struggle of the Korean people to drive the US imperialist aggressors out of south Korea and reunify the country independently.

— Kim Il Sung, 1969

In the future, the young people of Korea will continue to march forward with great force in the vanguard of the struggle for the building of socialism and communism under the leadership of our Party.

They will further strengthen the ties of friendship and solidarity with the progressive youth of the whole world, including the Finnish youth, and will always fight staunchly together with them, on the same side of the barricade in the struggle against the imperialists headed by US imperialism.

— Kim Il Sung, 1969

Kim Il Sung became known in Finland by the end of the Korean War. By 1952 the Communist Party of Finland published a short biography of him in its yearbook and in 1958 Kim gave an interview to Kansan Uutiset. A new interview was given when a delegation of the Democratic Youth League of Finland visited North Korea in 1969. A committee of solidarity with North Korea was established in 1968. In 1970, the committee evolved into the Finnish-Korea Association.

The Finnish delegation to the 13th World Festival of Youth and Students in 1989 in Pyongyang was greatly reduced when the National Union of University Students in Finland canceled their planned visit, citing official remarks of North Korea that supported the violent Chinese government reaction to the 1989 Tiananmen Square protests.

There is a friendship association to promote Finnish–North Korean relations in Finland called Finland–Korea Association. Likewise, North Korea has its Korea–Finland Association.

Several Finnish organizations have been set up since the 1960s and 1970s to study Juche. In addition to the Finnish Society for the Study of the Juche Idea it has been studied by the Communist Party of Finland. There are plaques from Finnish Juche associations from Vaasa, Jyväskylä, Joensuu, and Tampere at the Juche Tower. In the 1970s, as much as 71 propaganda works were translated to Finnish, a language spoken by relatively few people worldwide, at great expense. These were distributed to anyone having contacts with the embassy, various leftist organizations, and even Sámi people. Some books penned by Finnish authors are prominently distributed in North Korea.

The Finnish Pentecostal charity Fida International has worked with healthcare and potato production in North Korea since 1998. The organization is what North Koreans are most likely to know about Finland. One Finnish family of expatriates working for Fida lives in North Korea. The Finnish Red Cross also operates in the country, in the field of preventing flood and drought damage.

A Finnish poll found that North Korea is the second least desirable foreign country that Finns would move to, after Russia.

Three Finnish travel agencies – Olympia, Mandala Travel, and Travel Oy – arrange tourist trips to North Korea, although the Finnish Ministry for Foreign Affairs cautions against unnecessary travel to the country.

North Korean exchange students have sought to study in Finland, but the Finnish Foreign Ministry has refused their entry, although a small group of dentistry students has been on a study trip.

== See also ==
- Foreign relations of Finland
- Foreign relations of North Korea
