= South Korea–European Union relations =

Euro–South Korean relations
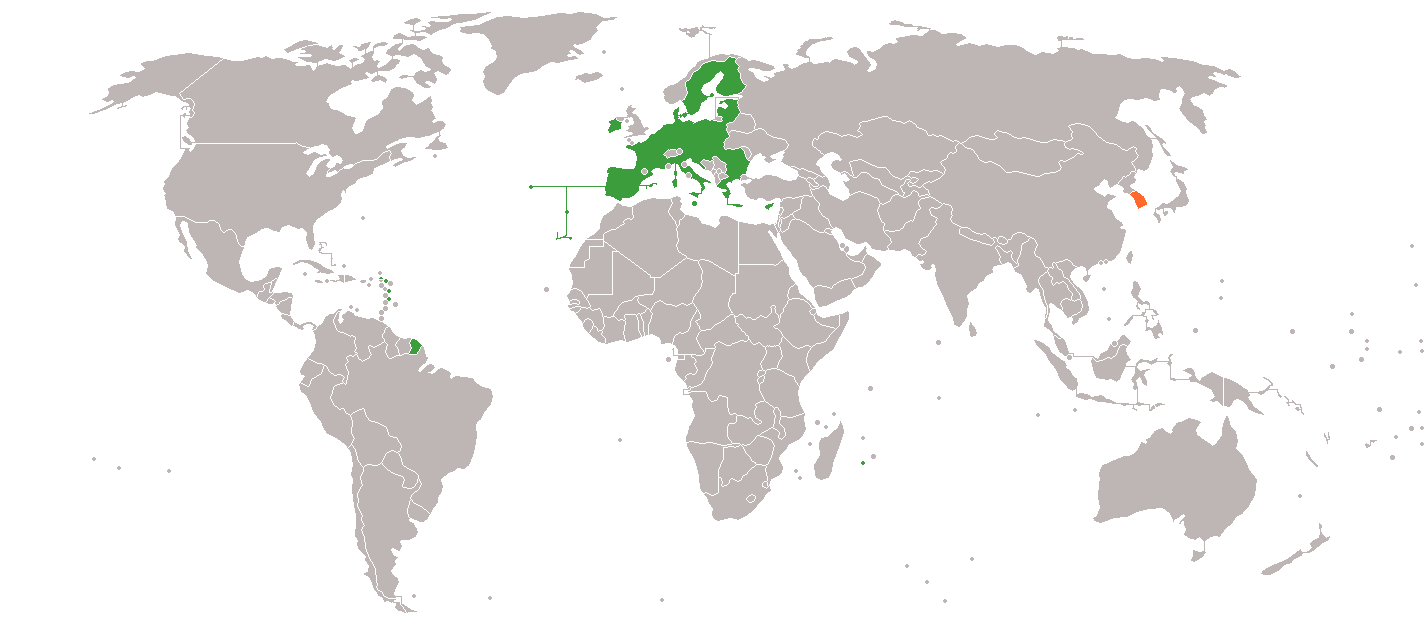
- European Union: South Korea

Diplomatic mission
- European Union Delegation, Seoul: Embassy to Belgium and the European Union and Permanent Mission to the NATO, Brussels

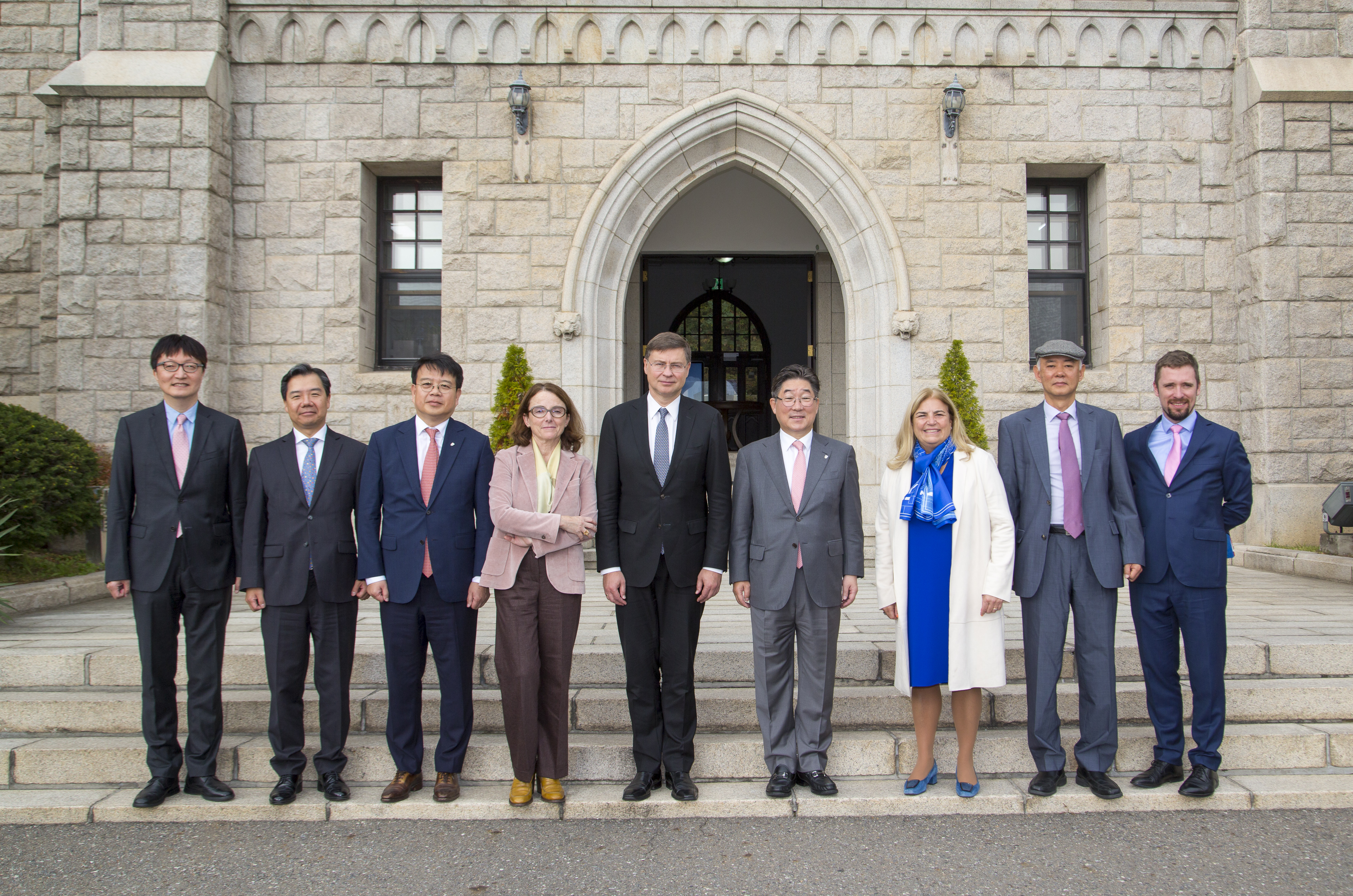
Valdis Dombrovskis, Executive Vice-President of the European Commission, meets with Korea University President Kim Dong-one at the university in Seoul in 2023.

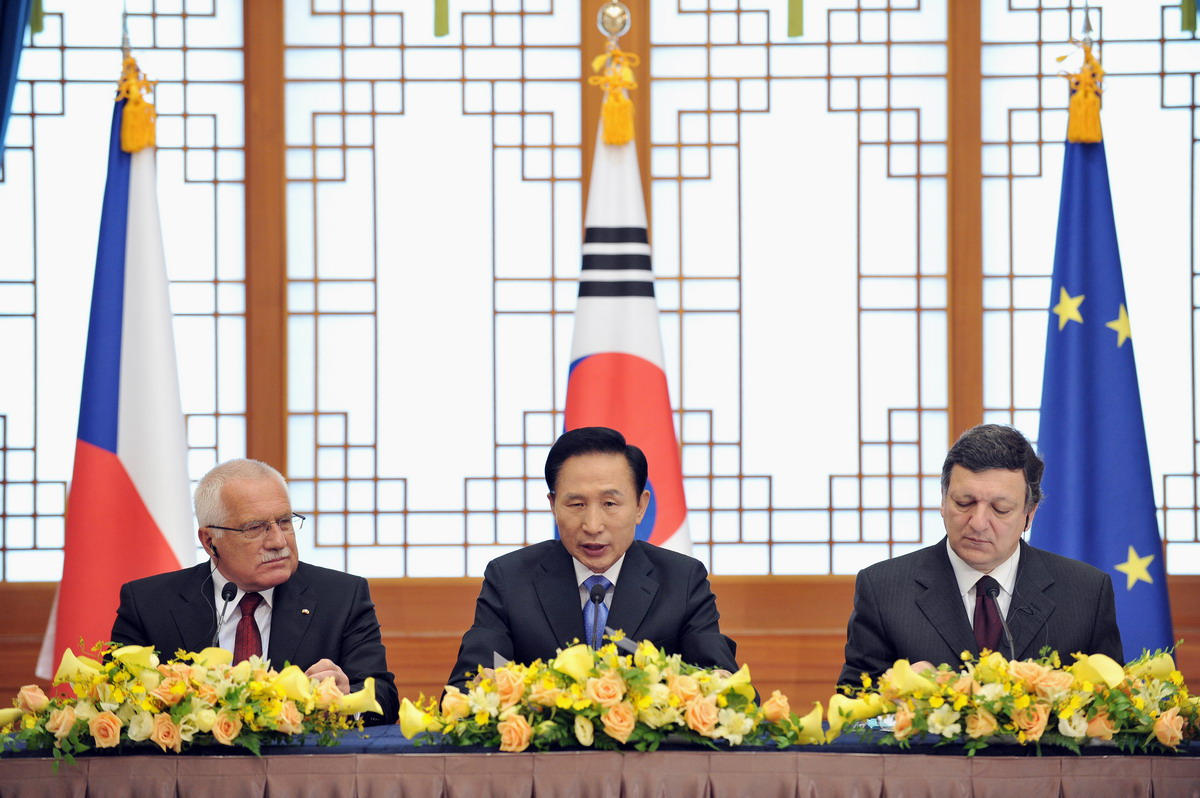
The Fourth Summit Meeting between the South Korea and the European Union.

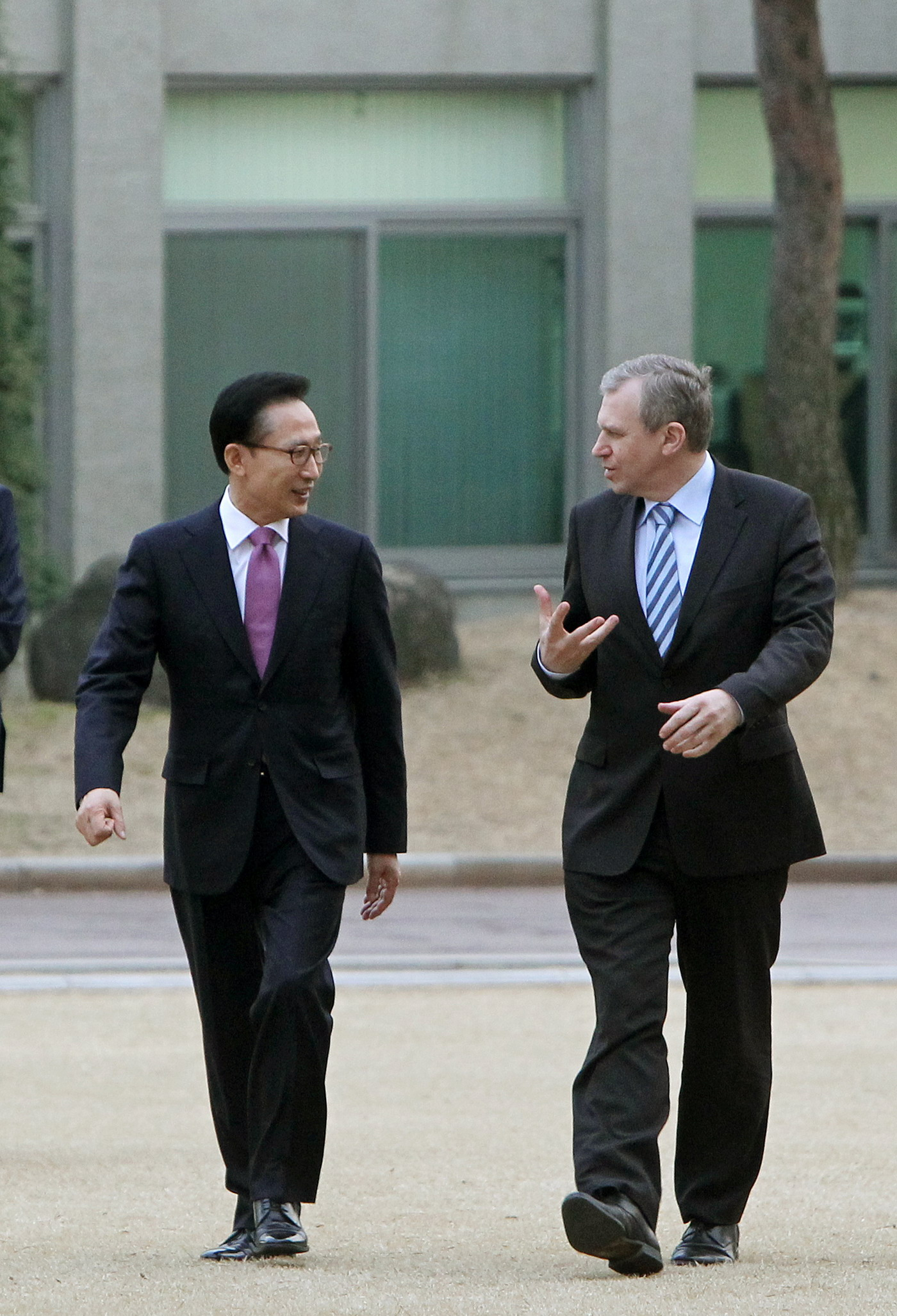
President Lee Myung-bak and the Belgian Prime Minister Yves Leterme in Brussels.

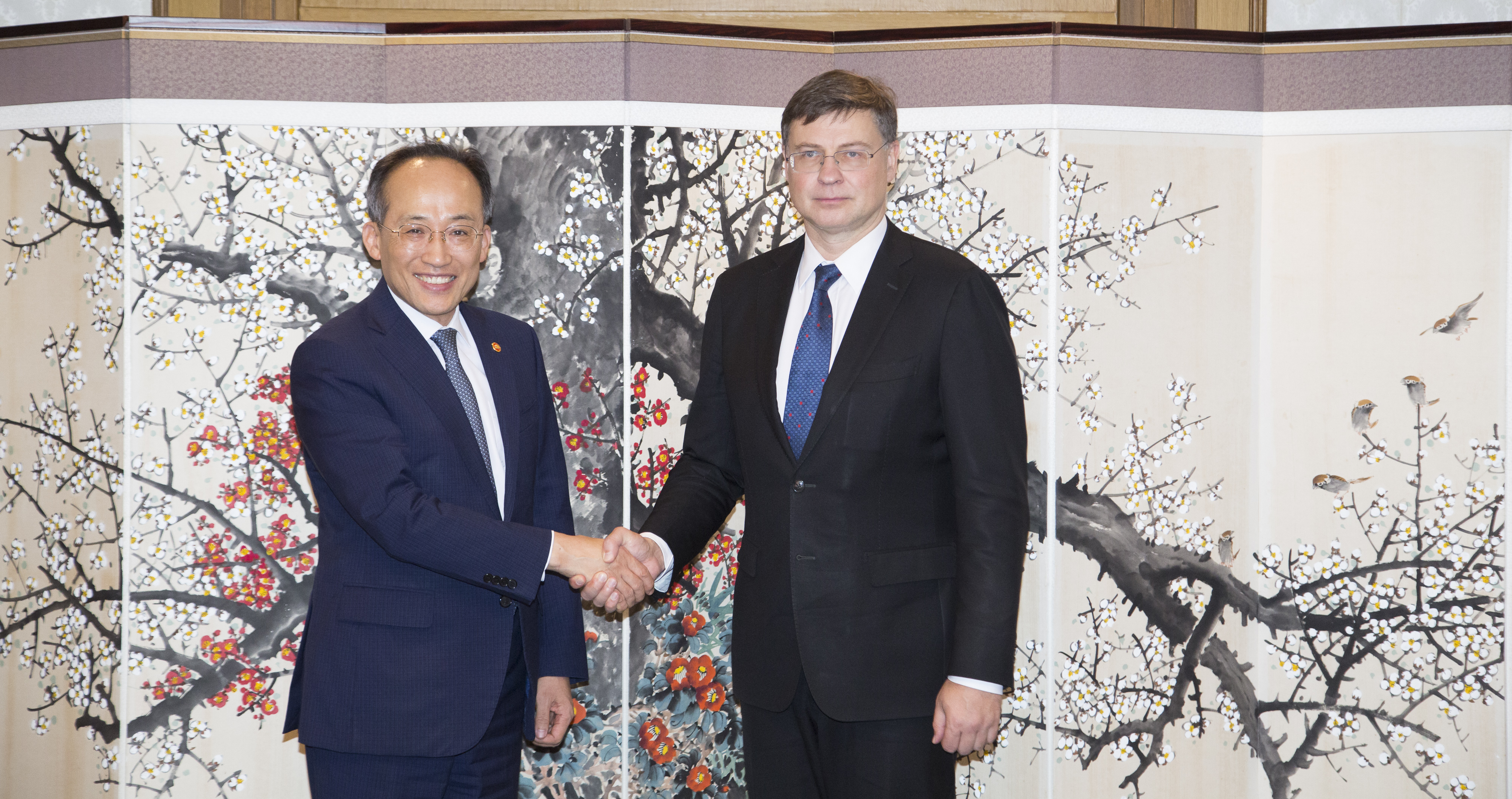
Choo Kyung-ho, Deputy Prime Minister and Finance Minister of South Korea, and Valdis Dombrovskis, Executive Vice President of the European Commission for An Economy that Works for People at the government complex in Seoul, November, 2023.

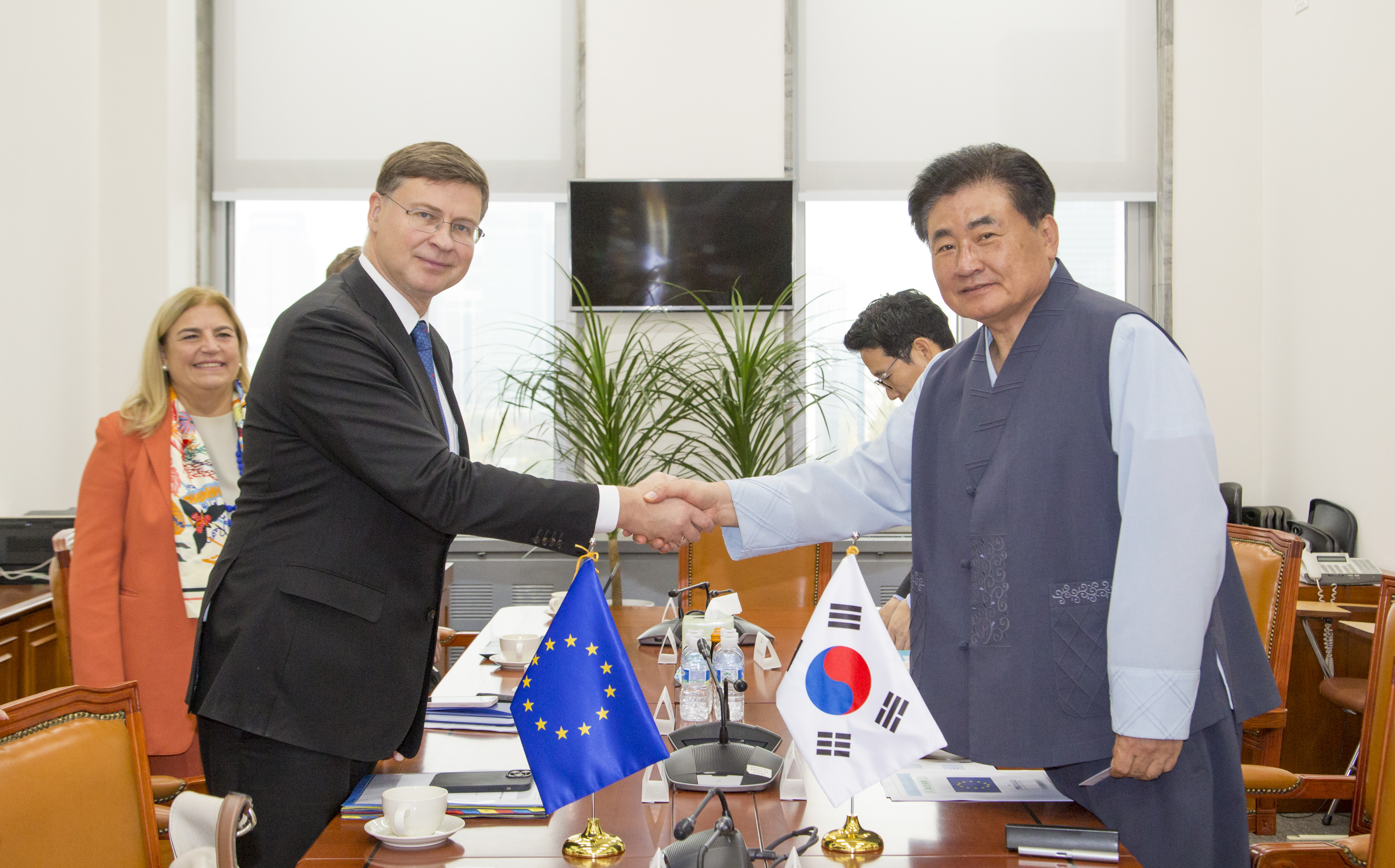
Valdis Dombrovskis meets with So Byung-Hoon, chairperson of Agriculture, Food, Rural ffairs, Oceans and Fisheries Committee of South Korean National Assembly, at National Assembly in Seoul, November 1, 2023.

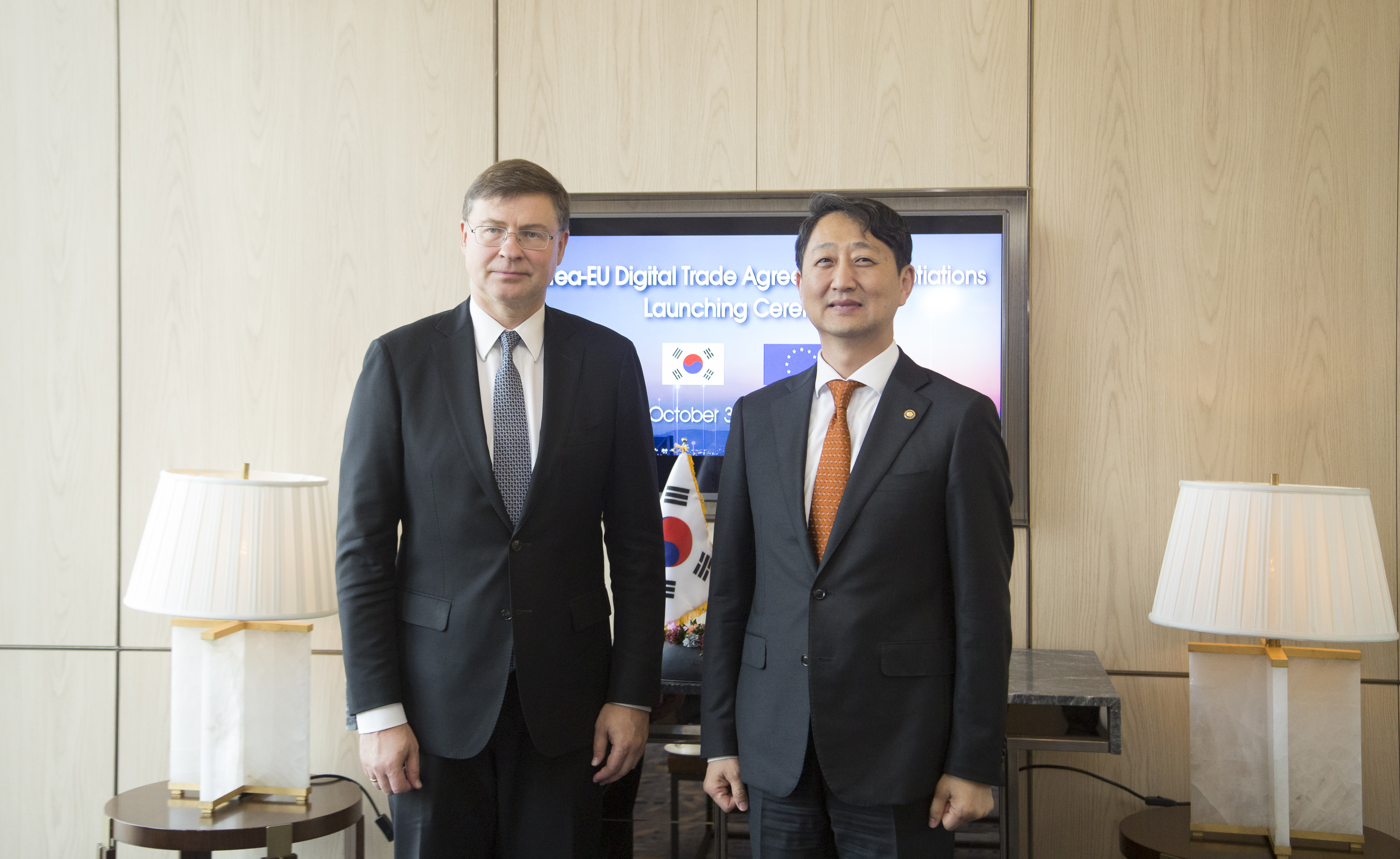
Valdis Dombrovskis, and South Korea's Trade Minister Ahn Duk-geun at Korea-EU Digital Trade Agreement Negotiation Launch in Seoul, October 31, 2023.

The European Union (EU) and South Korea are important trade partners: As of April 2023, Korea is the EU's third-largest importer. Excluding European countries, Korea has secured the third place on the list, following China and the United States. And the EU is Korea's third largest export destination. The two have signed a free trade agreement which came into effect at end of 2011. Furthermore, South Korea is the only country in the world with the three agreements covering economics, politics and security in effect as of 2020.

In 2022, South Korea's investment in the EU is $110.4 billion and the EU's investment in Korea is $116.8 billion, and they are actively interacting with each other.

== Agreements ==
The first EU–South Korea agreement was Agreement on Co-operation and Mutual Administrative Assistance in Customs Matters (signed on 13 May 1997). This agreement allows the sharing of competition policy between the two parties. The second agreement, the Framework Agreement on Trade and Co-operation (enacted on 1 April 2001). The framework attempts to increase co-operation on several industries, including transport, energy, science and technology, industry, environment and culture.

Following extended negotiations, the EU and Korea in 2010 signed a new framework agreement and a free trade agreement (FTA) which was the EU's first FTA with an Asian country and removes virtually all tariffs and many non-tariff barriers. On the basis of this, the EU and Korea decided in October 2010 to upgrade their relationship to a Strategic Partnership. These agreements came into force in 2011.

== Meetings ==
EU-Korea summits have taken place in 2002 (Copenhagen), 2004 (Hanoi) and 2006 (Helsinki) on the sidelines of ASEM meetings. In 2009, the first standalone bilateral meeting was held in Seoul. The European Parliament delegation for relations with Korea visits the country twice a year for discussions with their Korean counterparts. Meetings at foreign minister level take place at least once a year on the sidelines of ASEAN regional form meetings, however meetings between the Korean foreign minister and the EU High Representative have occurred more frequently, for example at G20 meetings. Ad hoc meetings between officials occur nearly monthly.

=== List of Summits ===
==== 2002 ====
- EU-South Korea Summit (Copenhagen)

==== 2004 ====
- EU-South Korea Summit (Hanoi)

==== 2006 ====
- EU-South Korea Summit (Helsinki)

==== 2009 ====
- EU-South Korea Summit (Seoul)

==== 2010 ====
- EU-South Korea Summit (Brussels)
  - Lee Myung-bak, President of South Korea
  - Herman Van Rompuy, President of the European Council
  - Jose Manuel Barroso, President of the European Commission

==== 2012 ====
- EU-South Korea Summit (Brussels)
  - Lee Myung-bak, President of South Korea
  - Herman Van Rompuy, President of the European Council
  - José Manuel Barroso, President of the European Commission

==== 2013 ====
- EU-South Korea Summit (Brussels)
  - Park Geun-hye, President of South Korea
  - Herman Van Rompuy, President of the European Council
  - Jose Manuel Barroso, President of the European Commission

==== 2015 ====
- EU-South Korea Summit (Seoul)
  - Park Geun-hye, President of South Korea
  - Donald Tusk, President of the European Council

==== 2016 ====
- EU-South Korea Summit (Ulaanbaatar)

==== 2018 ====
- EU-South Korea Summit (Brussels)
  - Moon Jae-in, President of South Korea
  - Donald Tusk, President of the European Council
  - Jean-Claude Juncker, President of the European Commission

==== 2020 ====
- EU-South Korea Summit (Video)
  - Moon Jae-in, President of South Korea
  - Charles Michel, President of the European Council
  - Ursula von der Leyen, President of the European Commission

==== 2021 ====
- EU-South Korea Summit (G7, Cornwall)

==== 2023 ====
- EU-South Korea Summit (Seoul)
  - Yoon Suk Yeol, President of South Korea
  - Charles Michel, President of the European Council
  - Ursula von der Leyen, President of the European Commission

==== 2026 ====
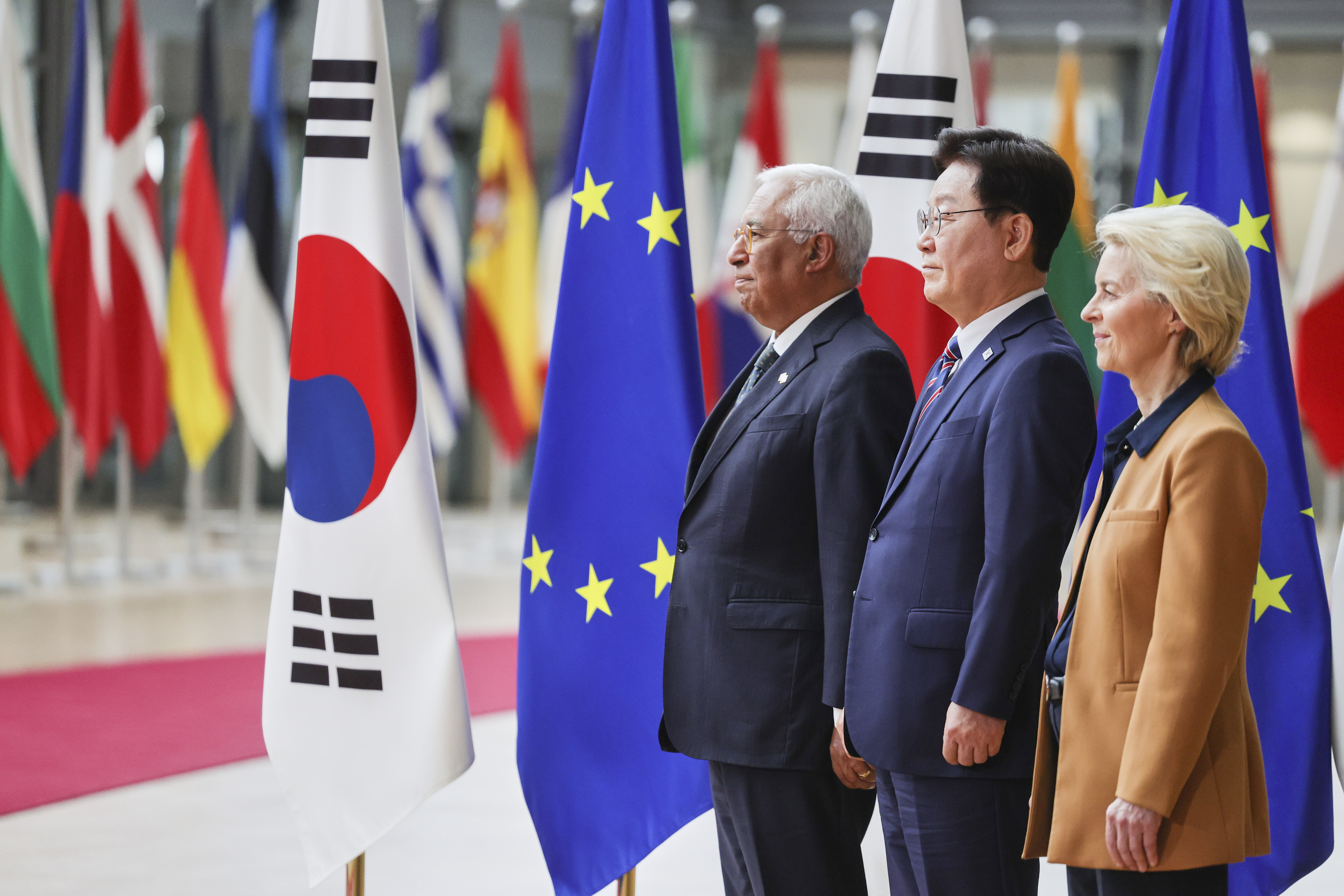
2026 summit

- EU-South Korea Summit (Brussels)
  - Lee Jae Myung, President of South Korea
  - António Costa, President of the European Council
  - Ursula von der Leyen, President of the European Commission

== Cooperation ==
=== Horizon Europe ===
Two years after South Korea officially expressed its intention to join Horizon Europe in 2022, South Korea and the European Union signed a Horizon Europe agreement, which is expected to allow Korea to participate in that from 2025.

=== Science and technology ===
South Korea and EU held the '2nd Korea-EU Digital Partnership Council' in March 2024, where they decided to invest a total of 12 million euros (16.2 billion won) over the next three years from 2024 to start cooperation in semiconductors, 6G, and cybersecurity.

== Trade ==
Trade in goods between the two parties was about €100 billion in 2017. The EU is the third largest importer of South Korean goods, while South Korea is the ninth largest importer of EU goods.

As of April 2023, Korea is the EU's third-largest importer. Excluding European countries, Korea has secured the third place on the list, following China and the United States.

=== EU to South Korea ===
(billion, €)

	2016	2019	2020	2021	2022
Services	€12.6	€4.6	€3.2	€3.0	
Goods	€44.1		€44.2	€55.5	€71.9
Investment stocks	€50.3			€65.9	

=== South Korea to EU ===
	2016	2019	2020	2021	2022
Services	€6.6	€7.7	€6.9	€7.9	
Goods	€41.7		€45.3	€51.8	€60.2
Investment stocks	€19.2			€36.0	

== South Korea's foreign relations with EU member states ==
- Austria
- Belgium
- Bulgaria
- Croatia
- Cyprus
- Czech Republic
- Denmark
- Estonia
- Finland
- France
- Germany
- Greece
- Hungary
- (Republic of Ireland) Ireland
- Italy
- Latvia
- Lithuania
- Luxembourg
- Malta
- Netherlands
- Poland
- Portugal
- Romania
- Slovakia
- Slovenia
- Spain
- Sweden

== See also ==
- Foreign relations of South Korea
- Foreign relations of the European Union
- North Korea–European Union relations
