= French Korean =

French Korean or Korean French may refer to

- French people in Korea
- Koreans in France
- France-North Korea relations
- France-South Korea relations
