= North Korea–European Union relations =

European Union–North Korea relations

- European Union: North Korea

European Union–North Korea relations are the foreign relations between the European Union and the country of North Korea. Bilateral relations between North Korea and the EU date back to the 1990s.

== Political relations ==
The EU has a policy of "critical engagement" towards North Korea. The EU wishes to help the DPRK "promote peace and stability on the Korean peninsula, in particular through support for international efforts to promote denuclearisation and an improvement in the human rights situation". The European Union first started diplomatic relations with DPRK in May 2001 and most EU countries have since made diplomatic relations with the DPRK. The EU has routinely mentioned the human rights situation in the DPRK bilaterally and through United Nations (UN) bodies, including co-sponsoring country resolutions. The EU still is concerned about human rights violations they allege are occurring within the country and has hosted talks with anti-DPRK defectors.

The EU wishes for the DPRK to not engage in nuclear or ballistic missile related programs or funding. It has not ruled out further sanctions if the DPRK fails to comply. The EU has implemented UN Security Council resolutions 1718 (2006), 1874 (2009), 2087 (2013), 2094 (2013), 2270 (2016), 2321 (2016), 2356 (2017), 2371 (2017) and 2375 (2017) and has also adopted additional autonomous measures that complement and reinforce the UN-based sanctions.

== Humanitarian support ==
The EU has delivered primarily food assistance to the DPRK since 1995. Some member states have their own efforts in addition to those of the EU.

== Trade and sanctions ==
The DPRK had economic interests in the European Union. In March 2002, the DPRK's trade minister visited certain EU member states, including Belgium, Italy, the United Kingdom, and Sweden, and the country has also been known to send short-term trainees to Europe. Additionally, workshops regarding DPRK's economic reform have taken place with EU diplomats and economists as participants. Before increasing economic sanctions against the DPRK in 2016, the DPRK's external trade to the EU accounted for less than 0.5% of the country's total external trade.

The EU has put into place restrictions on member state interactions to the DPRK as well, such as restrictions of certain services and financial support for DPRK external trade. Some of these services banned include computer assistance, nuclear or ballistic missile research, mining services, and refining services. The EU has a prohibition of export credits, guarantees, insurances, and investments to the DPRK.

The EU currently bars the import and export of arms to the DPRK as well as any nuclear-related or ballistic missile related items. The EU does not permit the export or import of many natural ground resources to the DPRK (i.e. coal, iron ore, gold, silver, etc.). In addition, the EU forbids the export or import of statues, helicopters, vessels, banknotes and coinage, luxury goods, textiles, aviation and rocket fuel, petroleum, natural gas, and seafood from or to the DPRK.

== North Korea's foreign relations with EU member states ==
- Austria
- Belgium
- Bulgaria
- Croatia
- Cyprus
- Czech Republic
- Denmark
- Estonia
- Finland
- France
- Germany
- Greece
- Hungary
- (Republic of Ireland) Ireland
- Italy
- Latvia
- Lithuania
- Luxembourg
- Malta
- Netherlands
- Poland
- Portugal
- Romania
- Slovakia
- Slovenia
- Spain
- Sweden

== See also ==
- Foreign relations of North Korea
- Foreign relations of the European Union
- South Korea–European Union relations
