= North Korea–Romania relations =

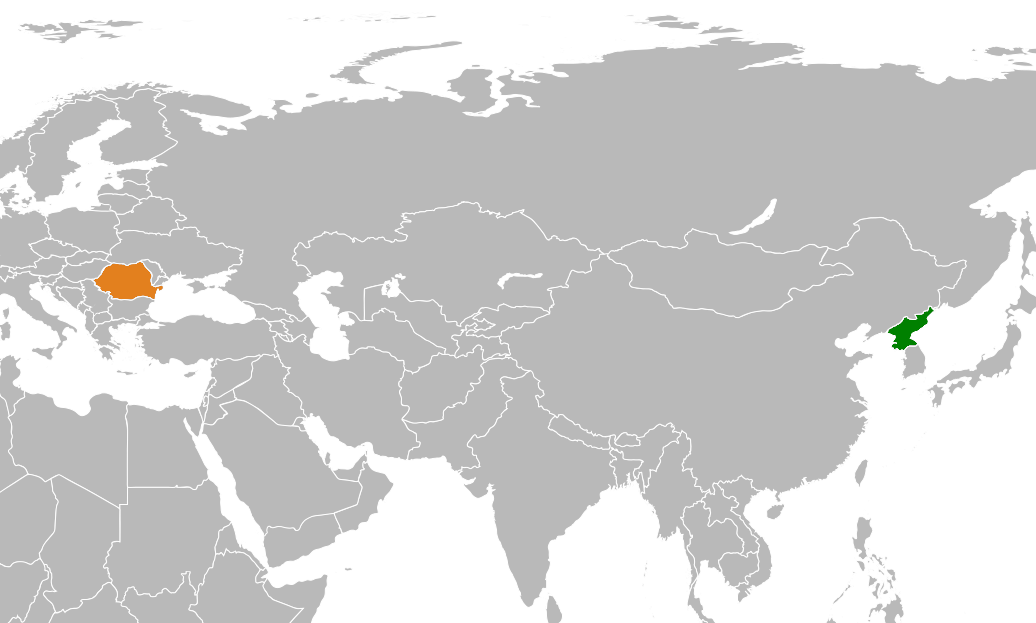

- North Korea: Romania

Diplomatic mission
- DPRK Embassy, Bucharest: Embassy of Romania, Pyongyang

Envoy
- Kim Son Gyong: Ambassador Andy Avram, Chargé d'Affaires a.i.

The Democratic People's Republic of Korea (DPRK) and Romania have maintained limited bilateral relations since the Romanian Revolution of December 1989. Relations between the two countries began on October 26, 1948, when Romania was part of the Eastern Bloc. North Korea had an embassy in Bucharest, and Romania previously had an embassy in Pyongyang, which temporarily closed in October 2021 after the COVID-19 pandemic. It was reopened in September 2026.

== Historical overview ==
The Romanian People's Republic formally recognized the Democratic People's Republic of Korea on October 26, 1948 as the sole legitimate government of the entire Korean Peninsula. Both countries were allies during the Korean War in the early-1950s. In the following years, the two countries had little contact.

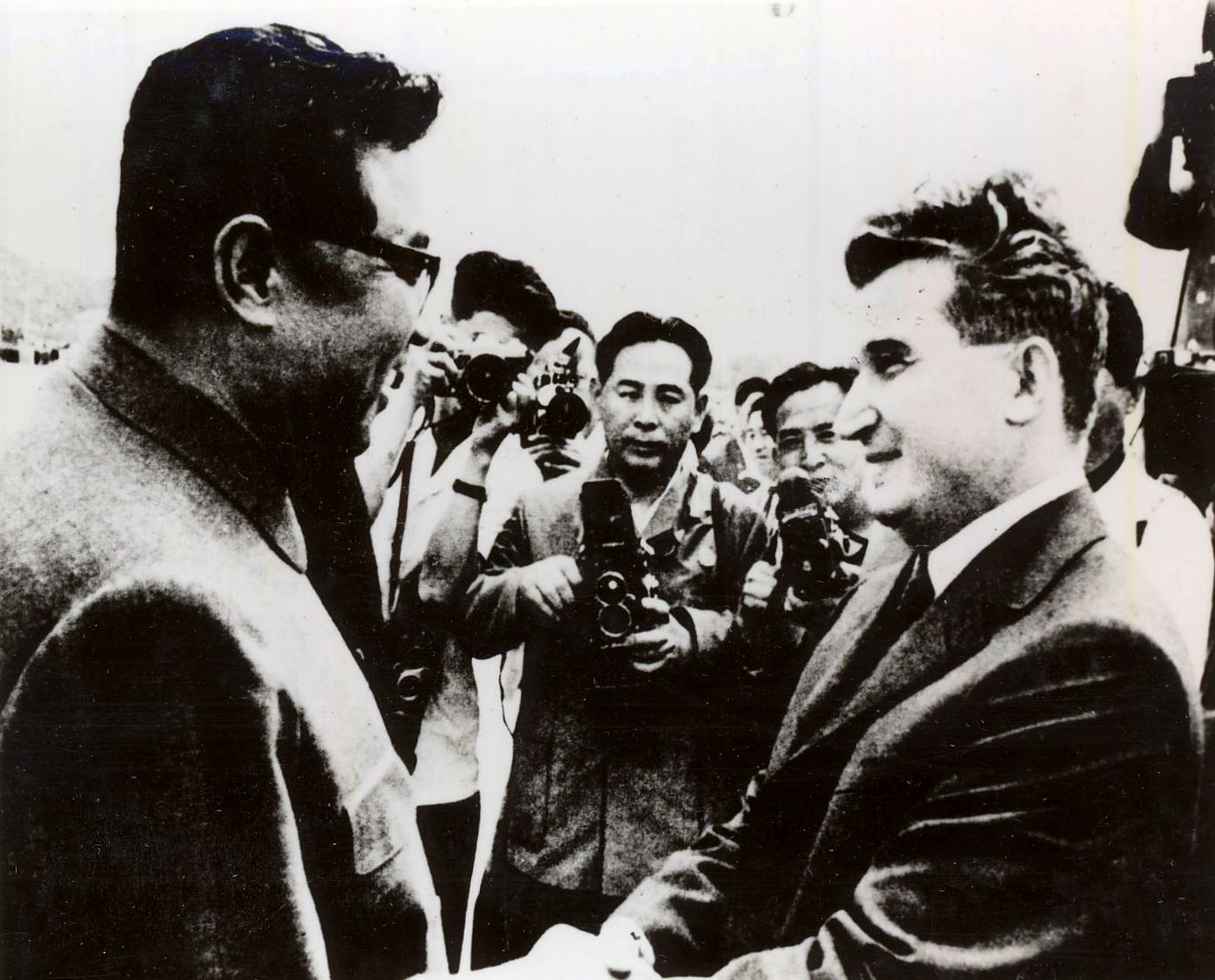
Ceaușescu meets Kim on 15 June 1971

On June 15, 1971, the president of the newly renamed Socialist Republic of Romania, Nicolae Ceaușescu, visited North Korea. He took great interest in the idea of total national transformation as embodied in the programs of the Workers' Party of Korea. He was also inspired by the personality cult of Kim Il Sung. According to the British journalist Edward Behr, Ceaușescu admired Kim as a leader because he dominated his nation and broke free from Soviet control, combining totalitarian methods with ultra-nationalist and communist ideologies. Behr wrote that the possibility for "vast Potemkin villages for the hoodwinking of gullible foreign guests" that Ceaușescu had seen in North Korea was something that never seemed to have crossed his mind before.

Upon his return to Romania, Ceaușescu began to emulate North Korea's system, influenced by Kim's Juche philosophy. He issued the July Theses, a set of proposals that tightened government control over Romanian media, promoted nationalism, and intensified his personality cult. North Korean books on Juche were translated into Romanian and widely distributed inside the country. The militaries of both countries began to co-operate on sensitive issues. At the same time, Romania had a rapprochement with the United States. In 1973, North Korea tried to use Romania as an intermediary with the US, but the Romanian diplomats did not want to harm their developing relationship with the US.

In 1978, Romanian painter Doina Bumbea was abducted by the North Korean government. This may have been with the intention of providing American defectors in the country with non-Korean wives to avoid the birth of ethnically mixed Koreans. Romanian officials and governmental institutions have been left aware of Bumbea's case, but they have not given much importance to it.

== Post-Communist Romania ==
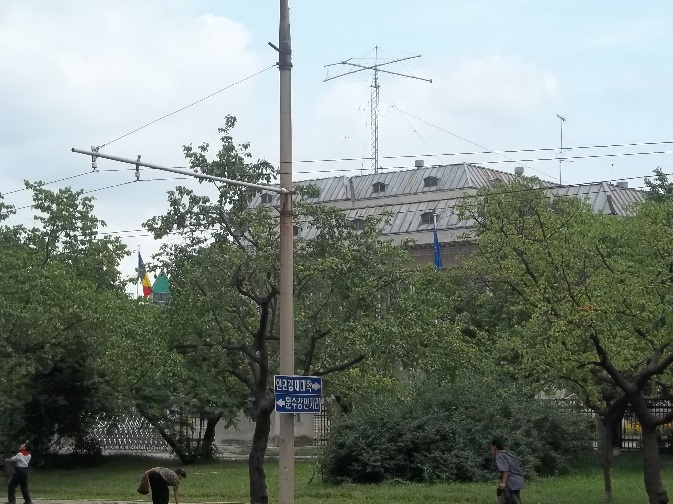
Embassy of Romania in Pyongyang

Relations between North Korea and Romania deteriorated after Romania's Communist regime fell. Ceausescu's execution during the 1989 Romanian Revolution and the 1991 dissolution of the Soviet Union resulted in Romania rejecting the totalitarian ideologies still promoted in the DPRK. Romania allied itself with nations hostile to the DPRK: it established relations with North Korea's rival the Republic of Korea (South Korea) on March 30, 1990, entered NATO in 2004, and joined the European Union in 2007. However, it continues to maintain ties in the educational field.

In 2016, the Romanian Foreign Affairs Ministry reacted to North Korea's hydrogen bomb test that occurred in January with a statement of concern that this test posed "... a challenge to peace and security in the region".

== High-level visits ==
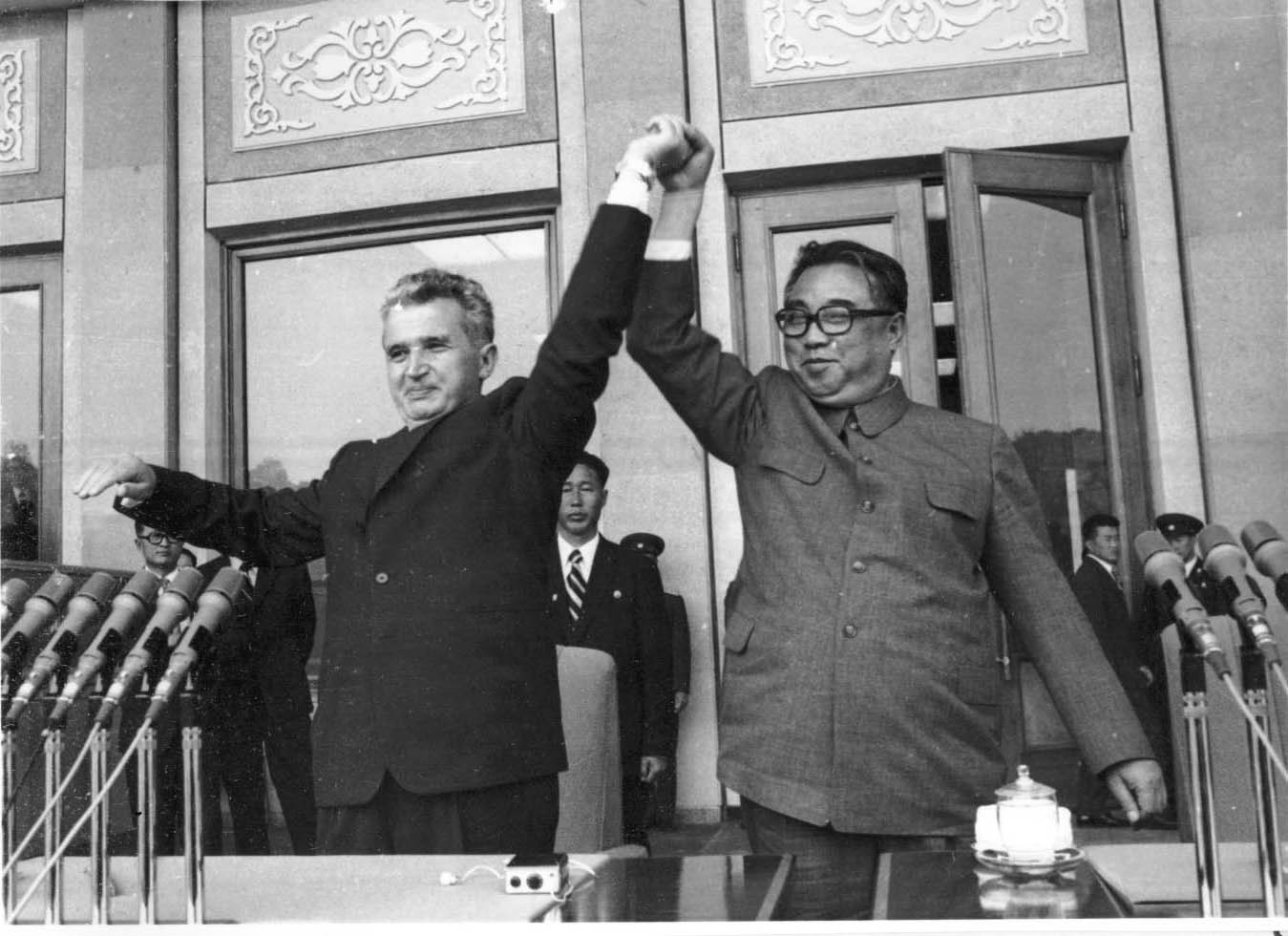
Ceaușescu and Kim in North Korea on 21 May 1978

High-level visits from Romania to North Korea

- President and Prime Minister Chivu Stoica (1958)
- General Secretary Nicolae Ceaușescu (1971)
- General Secretary Nicolae Ceaușescu (1978)
- General Secretary Nicolae Ceaușescu (1982)

High-level visits from North Korea to Romania

- Premier Kim Il Sung (1956)
- General Secretary Kim Il Sung (1975)
- General Secretary Kim Il Sung (1984)

== See also ==
- Foreign relations of North Korea
- Foreign relations of Romania
- North Korea–European Union relations
