= Hungary–North Korea relations =

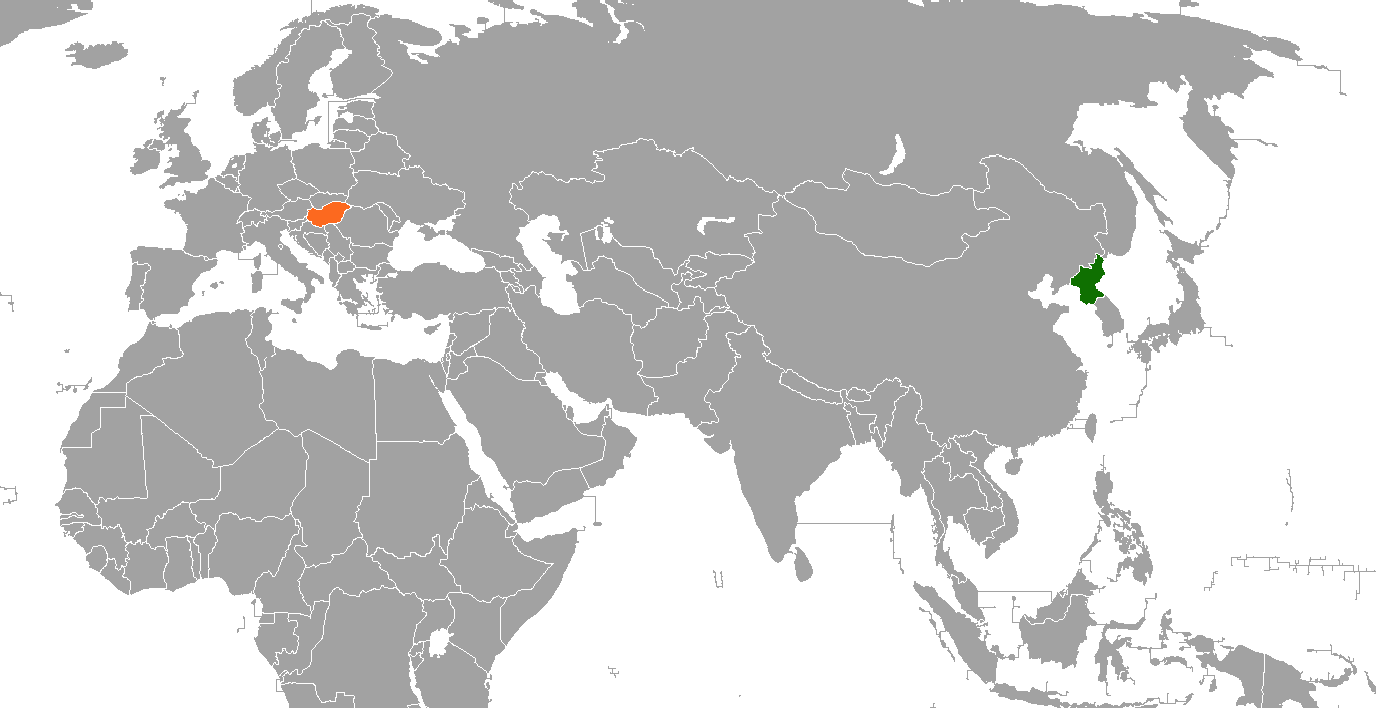

- North Korea: Hungary

Hungary–North Korea relations (Korean: 마쟈르-조선민주주의인민공화국 관계) are foreign relations between Hungary and Democratic People's Republic of Korea (DPRK), commonly known as North Korea. Relations between the two countries existed since the Korean War, but relations have been poor since 1988.

== History ==
The Second Hungarian Republic recognized the Democratic People's Republic of Korea on November 11, 1948, as the sole legal sovereign entity of the entire Korea. The agreement was signed by Hungarian Foreign Minister László Rajk, and DPRK Foreign Minister Pak Hon-yong; both would be executed by their own governments in the years that followed.

Hungarians and North Korean people had their first real interactions at the 1949 World Festival of Youth and Students in Budapest. During the Korean War, the Hungarian government invited orphans and school children from the DPRK to study in Hungary. School children from the DPRK began arriving in Budapest in 1951, where they were accommodated in a villa on Szabadság-hegy. The villa was renamed the Kim Il-sung Elementary School, where the children studied from DPRK textbooks under DPRK teachers. At that point, no Korean-speakers existed in Hungary, and the first Korean-Hungarian dictionary was not compiled until 1957. Because the Hungarian and DPRK authorities were concerned that the DPRK students were not learning Hungarian well enough, in 1952 the students were sent to normal schools in the area, where their teachers included poet Ágnes Nemes Nagy. Their school building was only used as their dormitory.

In 1952, the first university students arrived from the DPRK, and were given generous grants by the Hungarian government, which was the cause of some complaints from Hungarians. The early years of this scheme too were beset with problems: the DPRK students had immense trouble learning Hungarian, they could not adapt to Hungarian food, and one even tried to escape the country. Nonetheless, by 1956, 500 high school students and 300 university students from the DPRK were studying in Hungary. Most university students studied at Budapest Technical University.

The Hungarian Revolution of 1956 caused a split in the DPRK university student population. Some asked to be repatriated, however roughly 200 students joined in the revolution; their war experience proved to be of aid to the Hungarian students, many of whom lacked military training and could not operate the weapons and equipment they captured. In the aftermath of the revolution, Soviet forces and Hungarian police gathered up the North Korean students—easily distinguished from locals by their appearance—and deported them back to the DPRK, with a handful escaping to Austria and Yugoslavia. In January 1957, North Korean newspapers announced the return by train of 775 students from Hungary, due to the "hard situation" there. Some of the students who returned to Kim Il-sung University were reported for sharing news about how the Hungarian people hated their pro-Soviet regime. The DPRK did not send any more students to Hungary.

In 1988, Kim Jong-il's brother Kim Pyong-il was assigned to Hungary as the DPRK's ambassador. However, little more than a year later, Hungary would become the first Eastern Bloc nation to open relations with South Korea; in response, the DPRK withdrew Kim from Hungary and sent him to Bulgaria instead. They angrily referred to the Hungarian decision as a "betrayal", and then expelled the Hungarian envoy to Pyongyang, Miklós Lengyel. This led to a downturn in bilateral ties which lasted over a decade-and-a-half; in a 2004 interview with The Korea Herald, then-deputy State Secretary Gábor Szentiványi indicated that his government were interested in improving their relations with the North. However, as of 2009, the former Hungarian embassy building in Pyongyang remained empty; Budapest's relations with Pyongyang are handled through their embassy in Beijing, though according to Lengyel, who since became Hungary's ambassador to South Korea, there were plans of transferring the responsibility for that relationship to him.

In 2002, it emerged that a former North Korean diplomat in Budapest had been involved in international arms trafficking while in Hungary.

== List of ambassadors of North Korea to Budapest ==
- Kwŏn O-jik (권오직, 權五稷): June 1950 – January 1952
- Han Hyo-sam (한효삼): March 1952 – September 1953
- An Yŏng (안영): November 1953 – July 1957
- Hong Dong-ch'ŏl (홍동철): July 1957 – December 1959
- Ri Dong-gŏn (리동건): December 1959 – 1962
- Son Chan Ryom: December 1962 – June 1966
- Son Ja-ryŏng (손자령) July 1966 – 1967
- An Min-su (안민수, 安民洙): November 1967 (interim)
- Ri Dong Son: April 1968 – November 1971
- Pak Kyŏng-sun (박경순) 1971 – 1974
- Kim Jae-suk (김재숙, 金在淑): July 1975 – August 1979
- Kim Yŏng-sun (김영순): August 1979 – June 1984
- Yu Yŏng-gŏl (유영걸): June 1984 – July 1987
- An Min-su (안민수, 安民洙): August 1987 – August 1988
- Kim P'yŏng-il (김평일): August 1988 – November 1988
- Pang Yong-gap (방용갑): November 1988 – 1989
- Kang Hyŏn (강현): 1989/1990 (interim)
- Pang Yong-gap (방용갑): 1990–1993
- Kim Wŏn-ho (김원호): 1994 (interim)
- Ri Son Ryong: 1995 (interim in Bucharest)
- Ho Kwan Ho: 1996–1997 (interim)
- Pak Sang-am (박상암): March 1998 – November 1999

Since November 1999, matters related to Hungary have been handled by the embassy in Vienna.

== See also ==
- Foreign relations of Hungary
- Foreign relations of North Korea
- Hungary–South Korea relations
