= Embassy of France, Seoul =

Embassy of France in South Korea Ambassade de France en Corée du Sud 주한 프랑스 대사관
- Location: Republic of Korea, Seoul
- Address: 43-12 Seosomun-ro, Seodaemun-gu, Seoul, 03741, South Korea
- Ambassador: Philippe Bertoux（2023-present）

The Embassy of France in Seoul（French: Ambassade de France en Corée du Sud, Korean: 주한 프랑스 대사관）is the main center of diplomatic relations of France to Korea, located in the district of Seodaemun. The current seated ambassador is Philippe Bertoux. France first established diplomatic relations with the former Kingdom of Joseon on June 4, 1886, through the signing of a treaty of friendship and commerce, which granted France the right to conduct missionary work freely within Joseon. On February 19, 1949, France officially recognized the Republic of Korea, becoming the fourth nation to do so. In April of the same year, France established a legation in Seoul, which was later upgraded to an embassy in October 1958.

== See also ==
- French Ministry of Foreign Affairs
- List of diplomatic missions of France
