= France–South Korea relations =

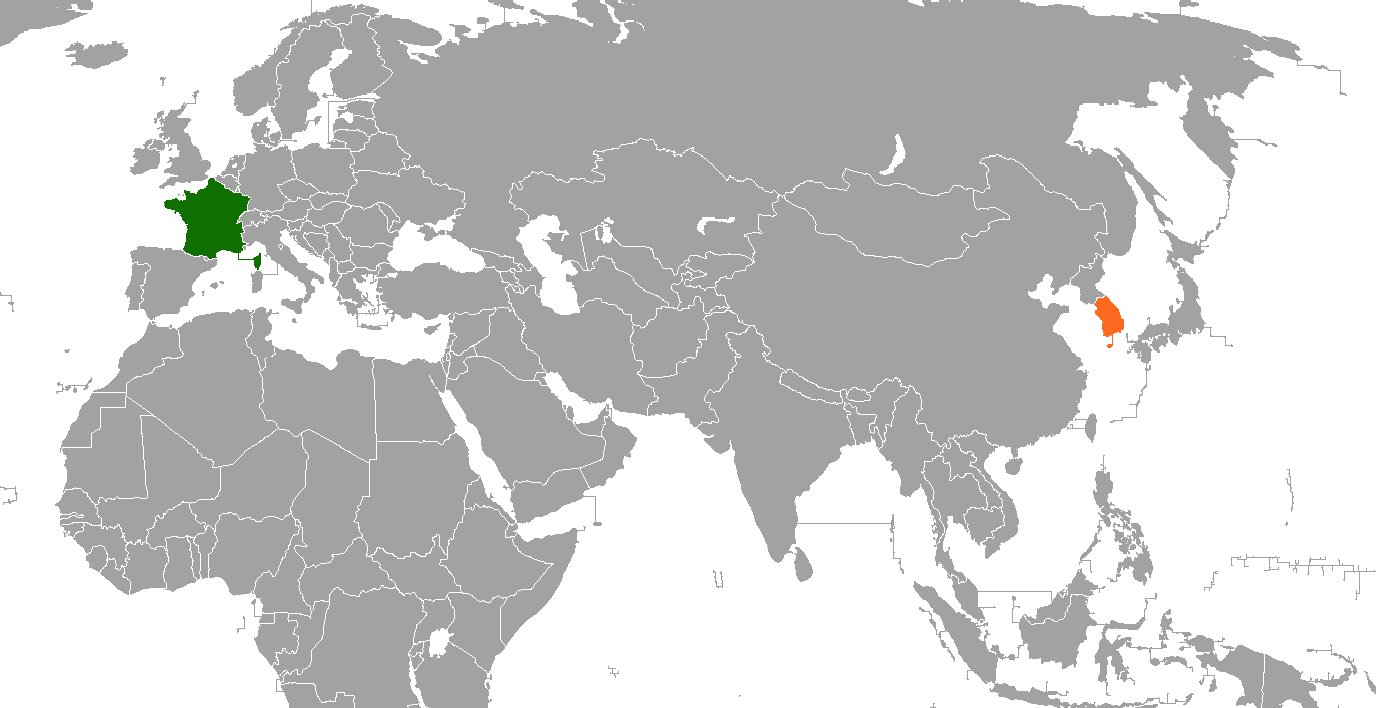
- France: South Korea

Diplomatic mission
- France Embassy, Seoul: South Korea Embassy, Paris

Envoy
- Ambassador Philippe Bertoux: Ambassador Yoo Dae-jong

France–South Korea relations have spanned over a period from the 19th century to the present. In 2016, France and Korea celebrated the 130th anniversary of diplomatic ties between the countries.

According to a 2013 BBC World Service Poll, 70% of South Koreans view France's influence positively, with only 11% expressing a negative view. French views of South Korea vary, with 42% viewing South Korea negatively, and 46% viewing South Korea positively.

France is one of the two European Union states, along with Estonia, and one of five UN states, along with the United States, South Korea and Japan, that do not recognize or maintain diplomatic relations with North Korea.

== Country comparison ==
Official name	French Republic	Republic of Korea
Flag	France	South Korea
Coat of Arms	France	Emblem of South Korea
Anthem	La Marseillaise	Aegukga
National day	14 July	1 March, 15 August, 3 October
Capital city	Paris	Seoul
Largest city	Paris – 2,175,601 (12,628,266 Metro)	Seoul – 9,765,869 (26,037,000 Metro)
Government	Unitary semi-presidential constitutional republic	Unitary presidential constitutional republic
Head of State	Emmanuel Macron	Lee Jae Myung
Head of Government	Sébastien Lecornu	Kim Min Seok
Official language	French (de facto and de jure)	Korean
Main religions	47% Christianity 40% No religion 5% Islam 8% Other	56,1% No religion 27,6% Christianity 15,5% Korean Buddhism 0,8% Other
Current Constitution	4 October 1958	29 October 1987
Area	640,679 km^{2} (247,368 sq mi)	100,210 km^{2} (38,690 sq mi)
EEZ	11,691,000 km^{2} (4,514,000 sq mi)	300,851 km^{2} (116,159 sq mi)
Time zones	12	1
Population	67,918,000	51,638,000
Population density	118/km^{2}	511/km^{2}
GDP (nominal)	$2.936 trillion	$1.804 trillion
GDP (nominal) per capita	$44,747	$34,994
GDP (PPP)	$3.677 trillion	$3.075 trillion
GDP (PPP) per capita	$56,036	$53,051
HDI	0.903	0.925
Currency	Euro and CFP franc	South Korean won

== History ==
=== Arrival of Roman Catholic priests ===
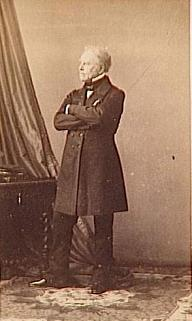
Jean-Baptiste Cécille.

Initial French involvement in the 19th century focused on facilitating the spread of Roman Catholic Christianity in Korea. The first French missionary to Korea, Father Philippe Maubant, arrived in the country in 1836. After that date, missionaries would continue to come to Korea from China, often at great risk. In September 1846, the French Admiral Jean-Baptiste Cécille sailed to Korea in order to obtain the release of an imprisoned Korean priest named Andrew Kim Taegon, but Kim was soon executed. In 1847, after various involvements in Vietnam and Okinawa, Cécille again sailed to Korea to try to establish some missionaries, but his ship ran aground and he had to be rescued by a British ship.

=== French expedition to Korea (1866) ===
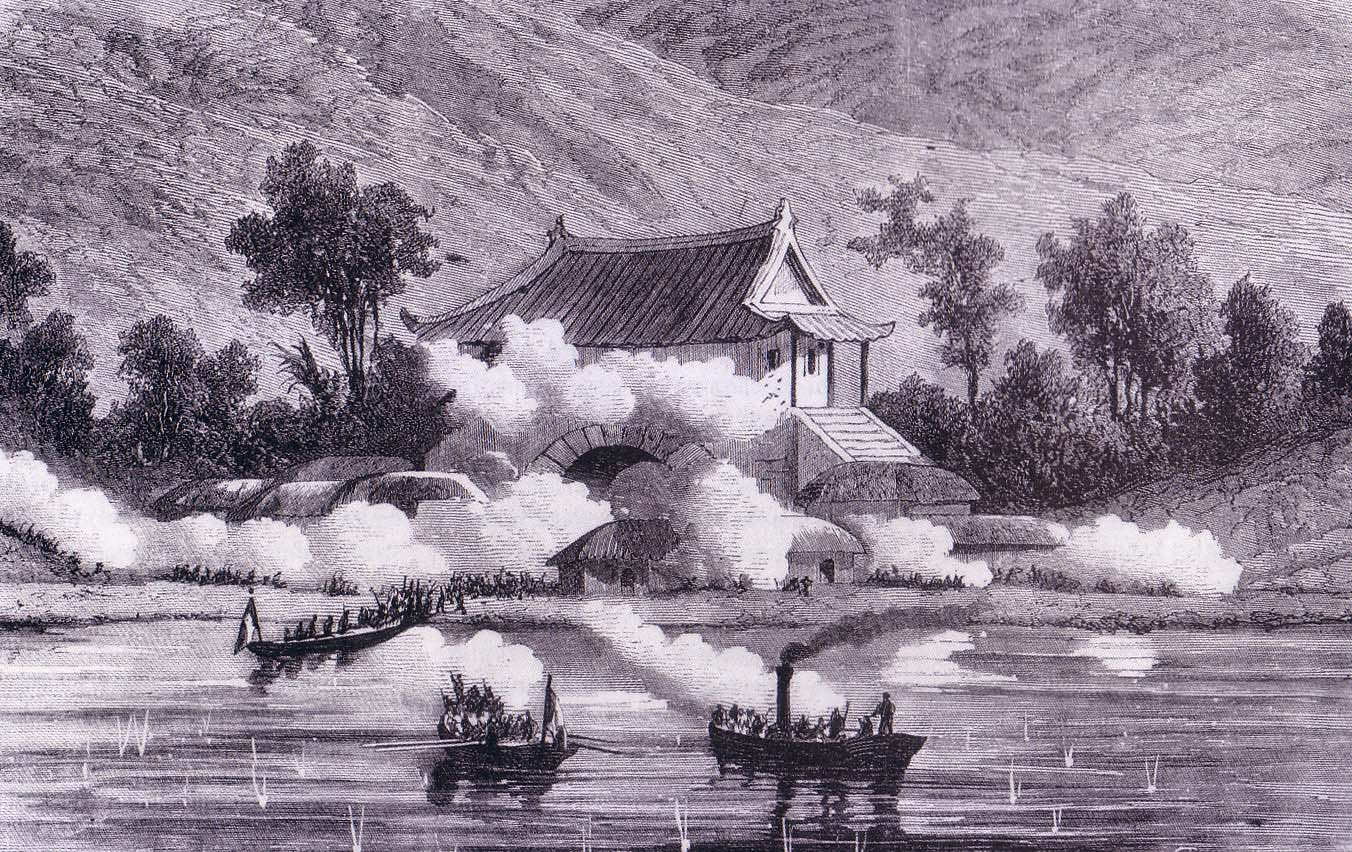
French landing at Ganghwa Island.

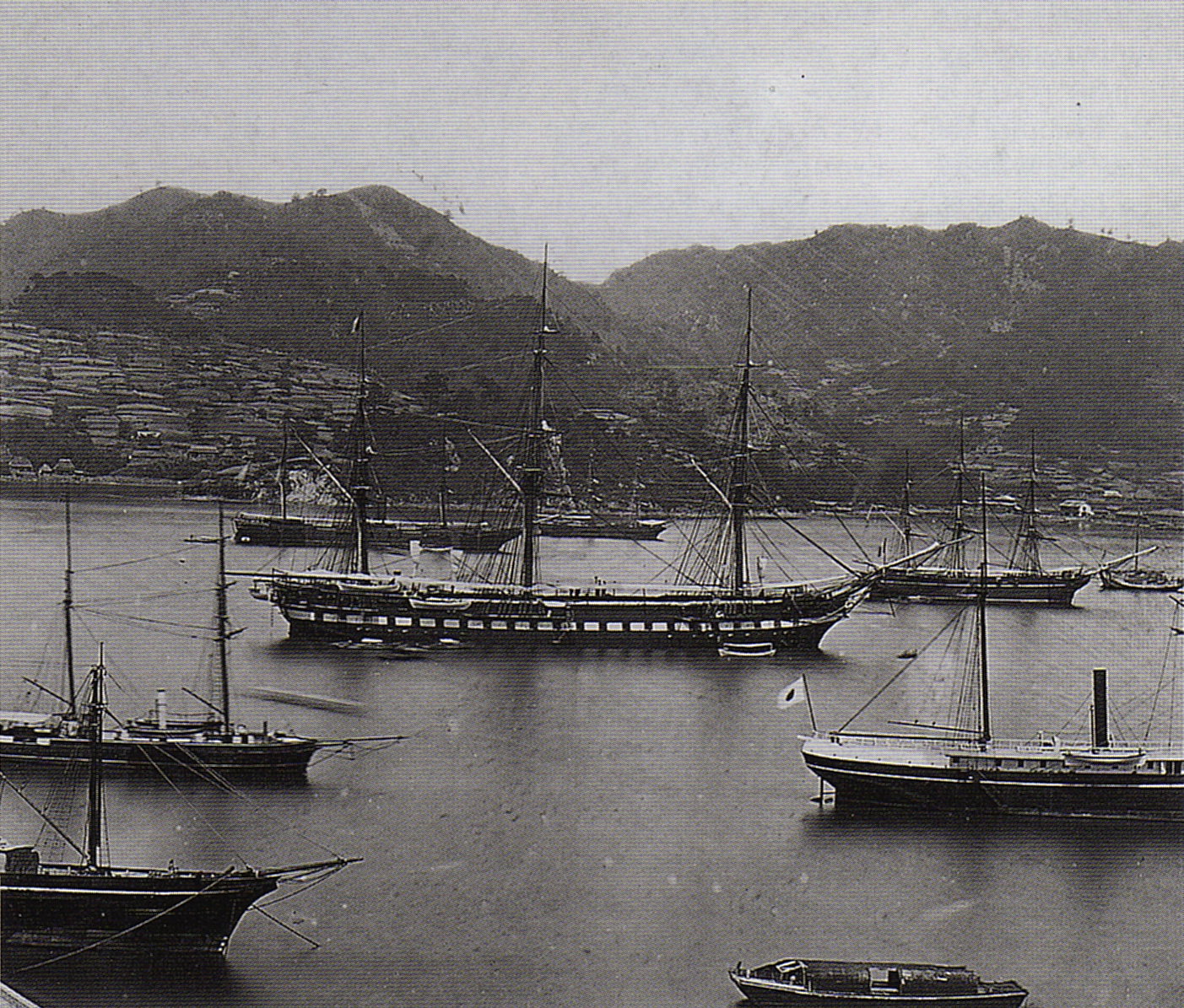
The French frigate Guerrière commanded by Admiral Roze was the lead ship in the French campaign against Korea. Here the ship is photographed in Nagasaki harbour, circa 1865.

In 1866, reacting to greater numbers of Korean converts to Roman Catholicism as well as the humiliations suffered by China at the hands of Westerners during the First and Second Opium Wars, the Korean court clamped down on the illicit French missionaries, massacring French Catholic missionaries and Korean converts alike.

That same year France launched a punitive expedition against Korea, invading and occupying portions of Ganghwa Island in the fall of 1866. At the first battle, the Korean infantry division lost heavily, and General Yang Heon-su concluded that only a large cavalry division could stand up to French firepower. An ambush by Korean forces on a French party attempting to occupy the strategically located Cheondeung Temple 傳燈寺 on the island's south coast resulted in French casualties. France's realization that it was far outnumbered and outgunned compelled it to abandon the island and the expedition. The entire incident later became known as the byeong-in yang-yo, or foreign disturbance of the byeong-in year (1866).

=== Diplomatic relations (1886) ===
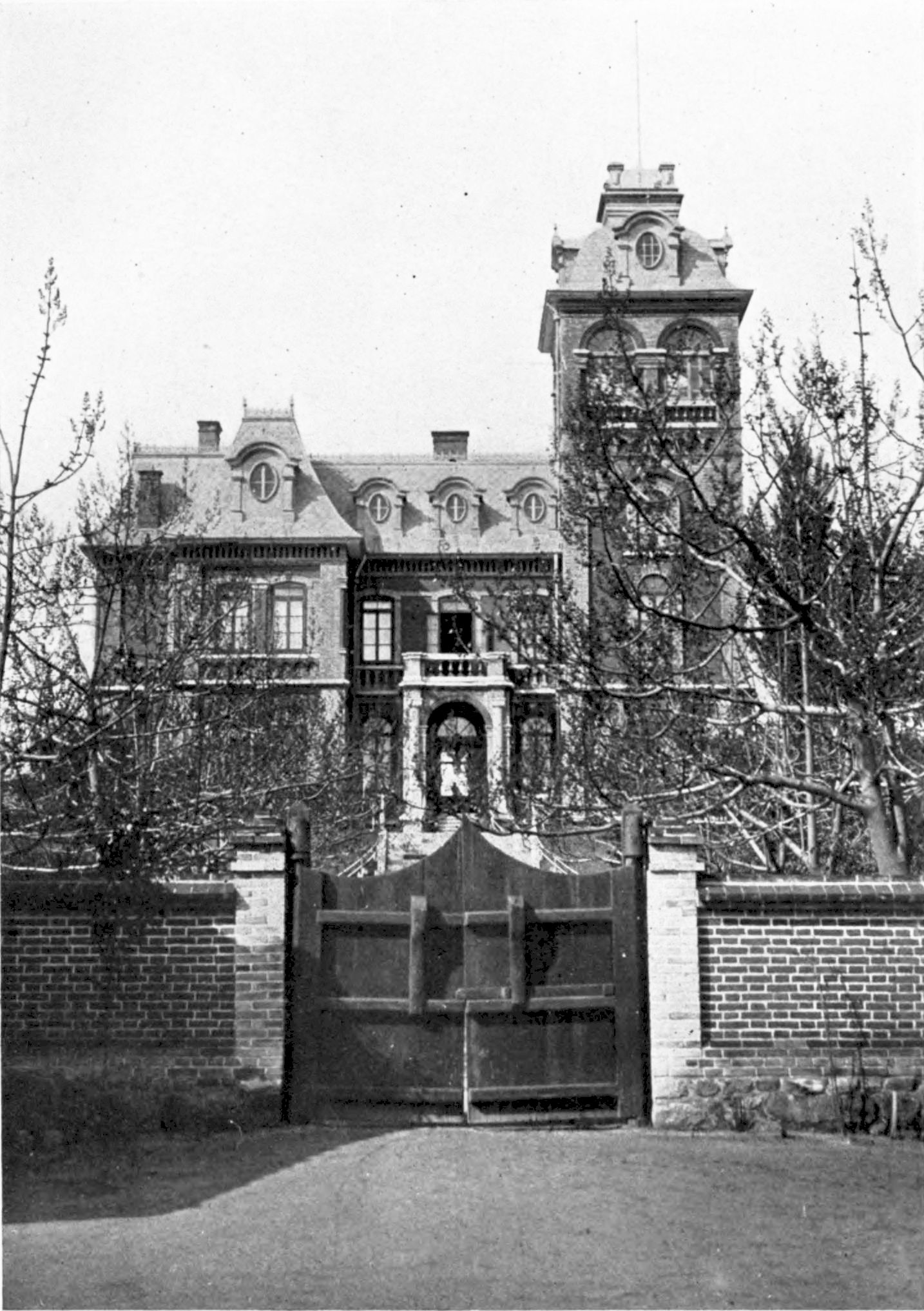
French legation to Korean Empire in c.1900

France and Korea established their first official relations with an unequal treaty, the France–Korea Treaty of 1886. In 1887, France sent its first official representative, Victor Collin de Plancy along with his translator, Maurice Courant. He [Courant] would later be known as the "father" of Korean studies in France. The first records of a Korean living in France permanently were from around this time; Hong Jong-u had arrived there not too long after official relations were established. Arriving in Marseille in 1890, he spent a few years working in France at the Musée Guimet, where he would be very helpful in establishing the first Korean Art and Culture section. Despite this, it was not until the 1900 Paris World's Fair/Exposition Universelle that Korea was "introduced" to the French public.

=== Interruption of diplomatic relations (1906–1949) ===
Korea under Japanese rule created a break in Franco-Korean relations. For more than 40 years, from 1906 to 1949, France did not have diplomatic representation in Korea. However, closure of the embassy did not mean that relations ended altogether. In 1919, a delegation of the Korean government-in-exile was opened in Paris. This acted as the liaison between the two societies during those years. In 1949, the embassy was officially re-opened and a new ambassador took office in Seoul. Unfortunately, he was taken prisoner and spent three years, from 1950 to 1953, in North Korea until he was released and granted a diplomatic post in a different country.

=== The Korean War ===
The Korean War was a turning point that helped strengthen relations between the two countries. Before that time, relations had always been more or less limited to a few individuals at governmental level. News of the war introduced Korea to a wider French public. From 1950 to 1953, 3,200 French soldiers assisted South Korea by taking part in the fighting. Of these, 270 were killed.

French participation in the Korean War improved cultural and economic links between the two countries. Though South Korea changed greatly in the following decades, the two countries continued to maintain normal diplomatic relations. The year 2002 was the first in which the number of French citizens present in South Korea surpassed the number present during the Korean War. By 2002, 6,000 to 7,000 French citizens claimed residency in South Korea.

== Present day ==
As at 2024, France and South Korea maintain good relations on major issues, in particular in relation to North Korea. France is one of the few European countries not to have official diplomatic relations with the DPRK. France has also supported the Six-party talks as well as the IAEA in attempting to find a solution to the nuclear issue. Besides bilateral cooperation, France and South Korea work together in international organizations such as the United Nations, UNESCO, and the OECD. In 2020 the French government described its relations with South Korea as "excellent".

However, at the opening in Paris of the 2024 Olympics, the large South Korean athletic representation was orally broadcast by the French commentator as coming from North Korea. The South Korean sports ministry immediately stated that it would make "strong complaint with France on a government level."

=== Economic relations ===
The EU-Republic of Korea Free Trade Agreement (FTA) came into force in July 2011. The agreement is notable for being the first trade deal the European Union (EU) concluded with an Asian country, highlighting South Korea strategic importance to Europe. This agreement aims to boost bilateral trade between South Korea and each country of the European Union as well as economic growth by eliminating tariffs on most goods they exchange. Benefits from the FTA include the elimination of 98,7% of all tariffs on industrial, fishery and agricultural products between Europe and South Korea, making goods more affordable and accessible. It also includes specific provisions to eliminate and prevent the emergence of non-tariff barriers to trade in sectors such as automobiles, pharmaceuticals and electronics. Additionally, in order for businesses to compete against each other fairly, anti-competitive practices that prevent, restrict or distort competition are prohibited and penalized under this agreement, which also strengthens the protection of intellectual property rights to encourage innovation and cooperation between Europe and South Korea. Finally, it promotes cooperation on standards regarding consumer electronics, thus eliminating red tape which had constituted a significant trade barrier. Over the last 10 years, the FTA allowed trade relations between South Korea and France to grow significantly, as France is a member of the European Union. In 2003, before the FTA was enforced, bilateral trade between Korea and France was 3.97 billion dollars. It reached €10.4 billion in 2021, exceeding the €10 billion mark for the first time, and €16 billion in 2023.

In addition to the FTA, the EU and the Republic of Korea have concluded negotiations for a Digital Trade Agreement (DTA). This agreement aims to facilitate digital trade by ensuring cross-border transfer of data, strengthen the protection on personal data and privacy of individuals engaged in digital trade and prohibit customs duties on electronics transmissions among others.

=== Cultural relations ===
In 2023, the Hanwha Foundation of Culture (한화문화재단) signed a memorandum of understanding with the Centre Pompidou in Paris to open an art museum in Seoul by the end of 2025. In April 2026, it was announced that the Centre Pompidou Hanwha will open on 4 June 2026, the 140th anniversary of diplomatic relations between France and Korea; the inaugural exhibition will be The Cubists: Inventing Modern Vision. Centre Pompidou Hanwha will be housed in Tower 63, the headquarters of the Hanwha Group; during the first four years the museum will present two exhibitions annually drawing on the Centre Pompidou’s collection and presented with exhibitions “highlighting contemporary Korean artists and the major trends currently shaping the international art scene.”

In 2022, the city of Busan signed a business agreement with the city of Cannes in France and the French Embassy in Korea to build « Villa Busan », a unique creative space for French artists at Hongti Art Center (홍티아트센터). This residency program aims to promote French visual arts in Busan and foster cultural and artistic ties between France and Korea.

In September 2022, the cultural department of the French Embassy in Korea launched for the first time the « Choix Goncourt de la Corée » (공쿠르 문학상-한국). Each year, Korean students studying French read and debate the finalist novels of the Prix Goncourt, France’s most renowned literary award. After months of discussion, they choose their laureate. A ceremony is then organised at the French Embassy in Seoul to announce the winner and to give the students a diploma for their participation in this event. The aim is to promote French language in Korean schools and spark Korean’s readers interest in French literature.

Over the past few decades, the number of students in France interested in the Korean language has increased significantly. As a result, more and more French universities offer Korean language courses and degrees in Korean studies.

== Diplomatic relations ==
In 2004, France and South Korea signed an agreement on social security (Convention de sécurité sociale franco-coréenne) that exempts their nationals from double taxation in each other’s countries. It came into force in 2007. Under this agreement, French people living in Korea can be exempted from enrolment to the National Health Insurance scheme of the Republic of Korea for a maximum of a year each time if they already have signed a contract with a foreign insurance company or insurance user. After the end of the relevant period, however, they must request exception from enrolment once again if they do not want to subscribe to the scheme.

From April 1, 2023 to December 31, 2025, the Korean Electronic Travel Authorization (K-ETA) is no longer required for French citizens visiting Korea for 90 days or less for tourism, visiting a family member, participating in events or meetings or commercial business in order to support the revitalization of the tourism industry. For countries which are not exempt from K-ETA requirement, the fee is 10,000 KRW.

Since 2009 with the coming into effect of the Agreement between the Government of Korea and the Government of France Regarding Working Holiday visas (Décret n° 2009-31 du 9 janvier 2009 portant publication de l'accord relatif au programme « Vacances-Travail » entre le Gouvernement de la République française et le Gouvernement de la République de Corée), Korea has bilateral working holiday visa agreements with France. A working holiday visa (H-1) allows participants to travel for up to one year in Korea by supplementing their travel funds with part-time employment. The aim is to provide them with the opportunity to experience Korean culture first-hand. As of November 2022, there were 620 French H-1 working holiday visa holders in Korea. Although there is no information available for the number of holders in 2023, 2024 and 2025, a growing number of French participants in the H-1 program was to be expected. During the same year, Korean authorities recorded a number of 9,800 French nationals on their territory (all visas), making the French community the most important in Korea among European countries.

In 2026, South Korea and France will celebrate the 140th anniversary of the establishment of their diplomatic relations.

== Scientific collaboration ==
In April 2004, the Institut Pasteur Korea was established in collaboration with the Institut Pasteur in Paris and the Korea Institute of Science and Technology (KIST) with support from the Korean Ministry of Science and ICT (MSIT). Its activities reflect a strong scientific partnership between France and South Korea, focused on research on infectious diseases.

== Resident diplomatic missions ==
- France has an embassy in Seoul.
- South Korea has an embassy in Paris.
Embassy of France in Seoul

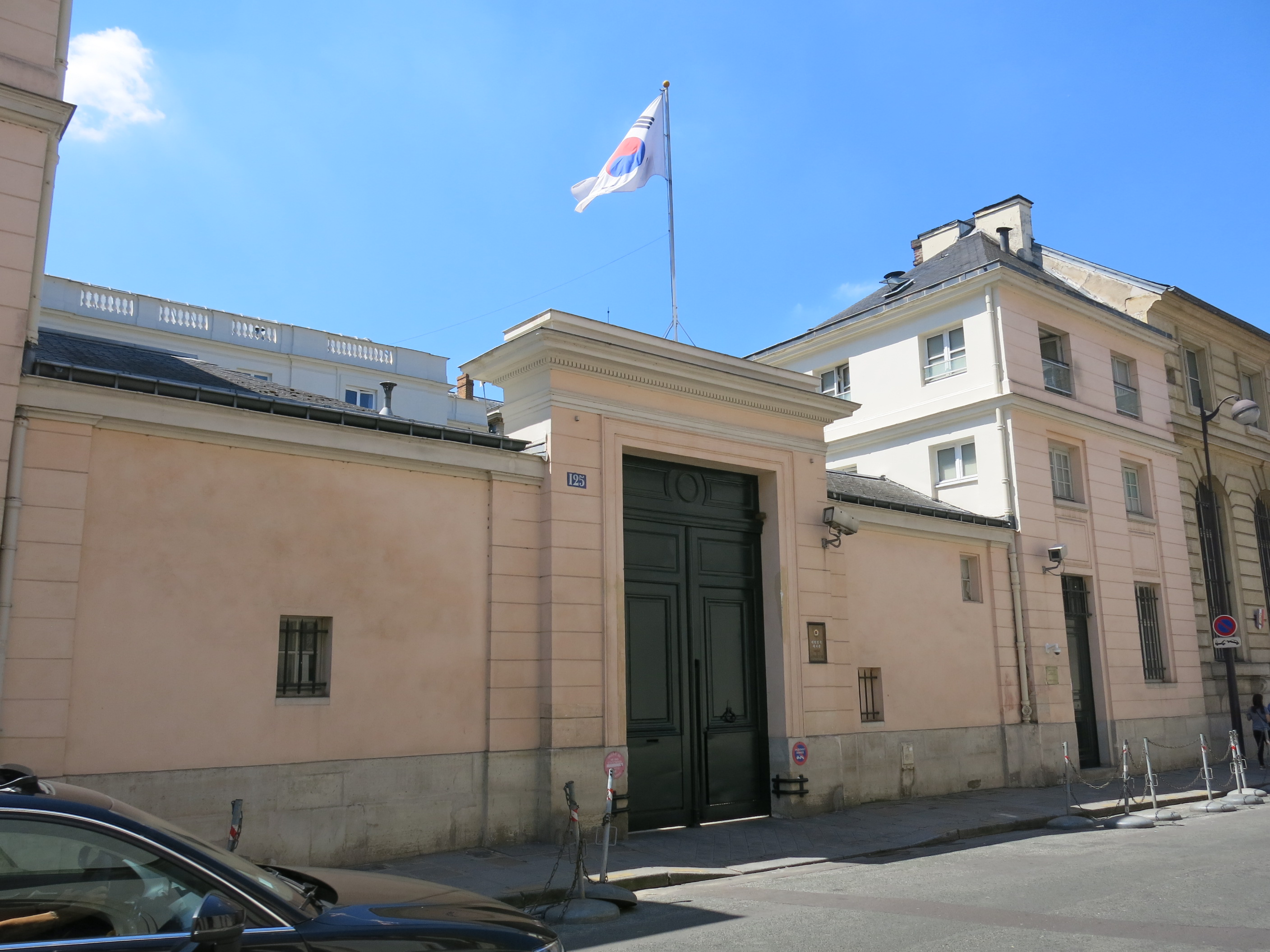
Embassy of South Korea in Paris

== See also ==
- Foreign relations of France
- Foreign relations of South Korea
- French Battalion in the Korean War
- French Campaign against Korea, 1866
- French-North Korean relations
- French people in Korea
- Koreans in France
