= Veikko J. Rytkönen =

Finnish politician (1924–2004)

Veikko Johannes (Veikko J.) Rytkönen (19 June 1924 – 8 September 2004) was a Finnish politician, born in Iisalmen maalaiskunta. He was a member of the Parliament of Finland from 1958 to 1975 and from 1978 to 1983, representing the Finnish People's Democratic League (SKDL). Rytkönen was a member of the Central Committee of the Communist Party of Finland (SKP). He was a presidential elector in the 1962 and 1968 presidential elections.
