= France–North Korea relations =

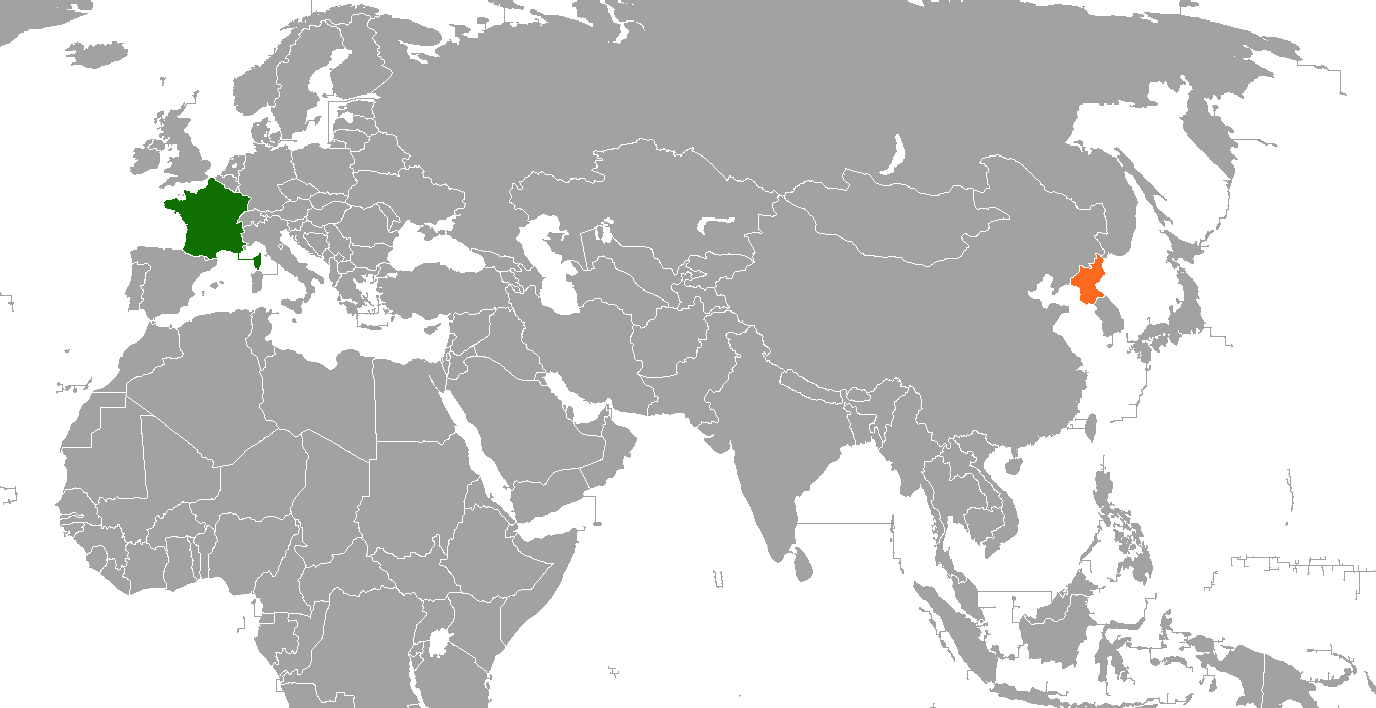

- France: North Korea

Relations between France and North Korea are non-existent, as the two nations have no formal diplomatic relations with one another. Along with Estonia, France is one of the only two European Union members not to maintain diplomatic relations with North Korea. In October 2011, the French government decided to open a French Bureau for Cooperation in Pyongyang.

In 2013, only 19% of French people view North Korea's influence positively, with 81% expressing a negative view.

== History ==
Relations between France and North Korea, in the sense of relations between sovereign states, are officially non-existent. Estonia and France are the only two European Union members not to have established formal diplomatic relations with the state.

France's official position is that it will consider establishing diplomatic relations with the DPRK if and when the latter abandons its nuclear weapons programme and improves its human rights record.

President François Mitterrand who toured North Korea in 1981 promised recognition to North Korea before he was elected.

In late 2009, French president Nicolas Sarkozy appointed Socialist politician Jack Lang his special envoy to North Korea, following a similar assignment earlier in the year to Cuba. Lang traveled to Pyongyang on November 9 for a self-described "listening mission" aimed at exploring bilateral ties and discussing the North Korean nuclear program, among other things. Lang briefed American officials including Deputy Secretary of State James Steinberg and special envoy Sung Kim, as well as ambassadors of countries involved such as Russia, before the assignment was publicly announced. Some critics questioned Lang's qualifications, but Lang said he would be driven by his "intuition" that change was afoot in North Korea.

On December 18, 2009, North Korea consented to the French government's offer to establish a French Cooperation and Cultural Action Office as a first step for normalizing the relations between the two countries. In October 2011, the French government opened the French Cooperation and Cultural Action Office in Pyongyang. The office has since been headed by French diplomats, "given the needs that have been identified in the cultural and humanitarian domains". The office focuses on cultural and humanitarian issues. The French government has made clear at the time that the opening of the office by no means implied the establishment of formal diplomatic relations of North Korea by France; such move would remain conditional upon "an improvement on the nuclear issue, inter-Korean relations, and the humanitarian and human rights situation".

== Economic and cultural relations ==
Economic relations are also limited. In 2005, French imports from North Korea were worth €24 million, and French exports to North Korea €6 million.

In 2005, there were officially 54 North Koreans living in France. The only French residents in North Korea are humanitarian workers. France provides humanitarian aid to the DPRK, and allows a small number of North Korean students to study in France every year. It primarily provides administrative training, and training in the field of architecture.

Albeit minimal, cinema is one of the few areas where France and North Korea cooperate. The North Korean film series Nation and Destiny is one of the country's only films with scenes filmed in France. In 2007, the North Korean film The Schoolgirl's Diary was released in France.

== See also ==
- Foreign relations of France
- Foreign relations of North Korea
- France-South Korea relations
- North Korea–EU relations
