= Veikko Saarto =

Finnish politician (born 1934)

Veikko Olavi Saarto (born 9 October 1934) is a Finnish construction worker and politician, born in Helsinki. He was a member of the Parliament of Finland from 1966 to 1986, representing the Finnish People's Democratic League (SKDL). He served as Transport Minister from 15 July 1970 to 26 March 1971 and from 15 May 1977 to 19 February 1982 and as Deputy Minister of Agriculture from 15 May 1977 to 19 February 1982. He was a presidential elector in the 1968, 1978 and 1982 presidential elections.
