= Martti Salomies =

Finnish diplomat

Martti Johannes Salomies (24 April 1922 or 1923 Helsinki – 19 April 1987) was a Finnish diplomat and ambassador. He was an Ambassador in Bucharest from 1963 to 1966, between 1966 and 1968, Deputy Chief of Department of the Ministry of Foreign Affairs, then Commercial Representative (Consul General) in Germany from 1968 to 1970, Bern from 1970 to 1974, Beijing from 1974 to 1976 and Tehran 1979–1980 .

His father was Archbishop Ilmari Salomies.
