= Pentti Suomela =

Finnish diplomat

Pentti Martin Suomela (21 September 1917 Turku – 14 July 2016 Helsinki) was a Finnish diplomat, a master of philosophy. He served as a negotiating officer at the Ministry for Foreign Affairs 1963–1965, Head of the Political Department 1965, Ambassador to Oslo from 1966 to 1972, Bucharest from 1972 to 1976 and Beijing from 1976 to 1984.
