= Fida International =

Finnish humanitarian organization

- Formation: 1927
- Type: Non Governmental Organisation
- Purpose: Humanitarian, developmental, and catastrophe relief aid
- Location: Helsinki, Finland
- Secretary General: Harri Hakola
- Website: https://www.fida.info/en

Fida International is a Finnish non-governmental humanitarian organization aimed at bringing hope and a better future to all nations, especially to children living in poverty. It was founded at 1927 and is rooted in pentecostal Christianity. Fida International is working on global missions, community development and humanitarian aid in 50 countries. Fida International is working in close co-operation with local churches and NGO partners. Fida's goal is sustainable transformation the gives marginalized and unreached people strength to overcome hopelessness, eradicate poverty and transform their communities. Fida's focus is in improving the rights of vulnerable children.

Since 2009, the secretary general of Fida International has been Harri Hakola.

== Secretaries general ==
- 1950–1960: Odin Finell
- 1960–1969: Tapani Kärnä
- 1969–1980: Unto Kunnas
- 1980–1983: Veikko Manninen
- 1983–1987: Tapani Kärnä
- 1987–2009: Arto Hämäläinen
- 2009– Harri Hakola
