= Hungary–South Korea relations =

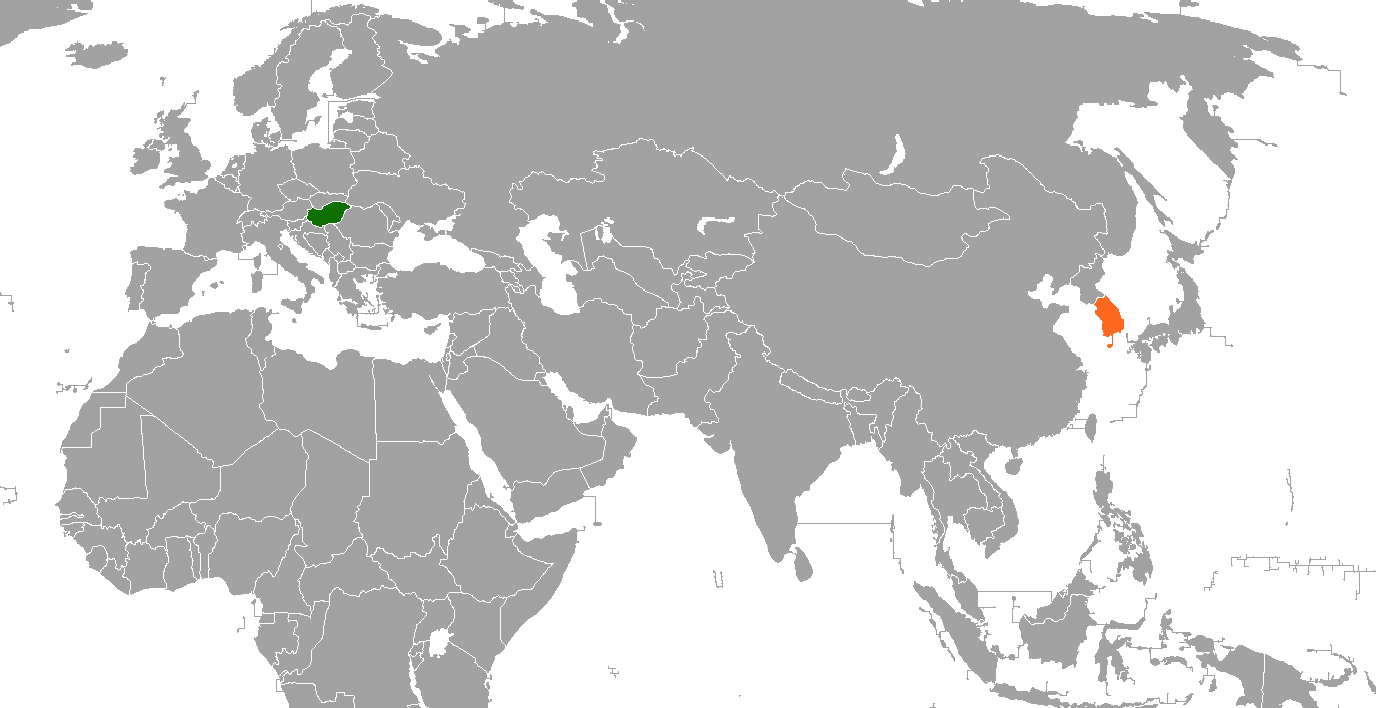

- Hungary: South Korea

Diplomatic mission
- Hungarian Embassy, Seoul: Korean Embassy, Budapest

Envoy
- Ambassador Mózes Csoma: Ambassador Choe Kyu-shik

Hungary–South Korea relations are the bilateral relations between Hungary and South Korea. Hungary has an embassy in Seoul and an honorary consulate in Incheon. South Korea has an embassy in Budapest.

Both countries are full members of the OECD, World Trade Organization and United Nations.

== History ==
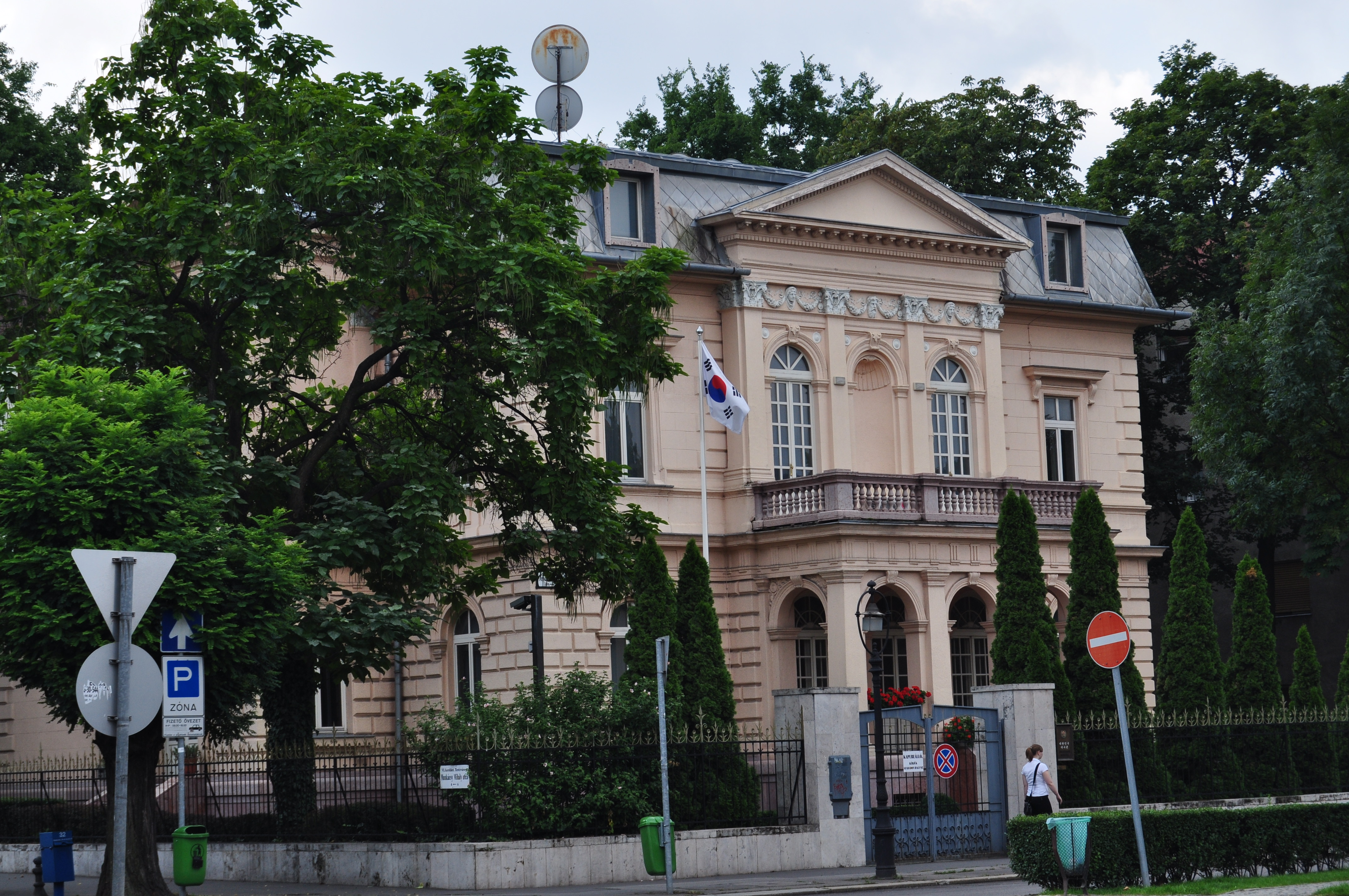
Embassy of South Korea in Budapest

Relations date back to the exchange of permanent missions between the two countries, announced during the 1988 Summer Olympics in Seoul. The announcement made Hungary the first Eastern Bloc country to exchange ambassadors with South Korea. At the time, a large number of officials from various Communist countries were in Seoul, having ignored North Korea's call for a boycott of the Olympics; along with Hungary, they also made various formal and informal contacts with the South Korean government.

Trade with Hungary was already valued at US$18 million at the time; expansion of economic contacts was widely viewed as Hungary's motive in the establishment of relations. Full diplomatic relations were formally established on 29 January of the following year. At the time, Kim Pyong-il, the son of Kim Il Sung and half-brother of future North Korean leader Kim Jong Il, had just arrived in Budapest as ambassador; in response to Hungary's moves towards ties with the South, the North transferred him to Bulgaria. Bulgaria soon followed Hungary's example and moved to open relations with the South.

== Notable events ==
=== Defection of a North Korean diplomat (2006) ===
In 2006, a North Korean diplomat in Hungary and his family members defected to South Korea by entering the South Korean embassy there and requesting political asylum. By 2007, bilateral trade had grown by nearly ninety times to $1.6 billion; major South Korean investors in Hungary included Samsung and Hankook. The Hungarian ambassador to South Korea, Miklos Lengyel, who began his service in October 2007, had previously worked in his government's mission in Pyongyang in the 1980s.

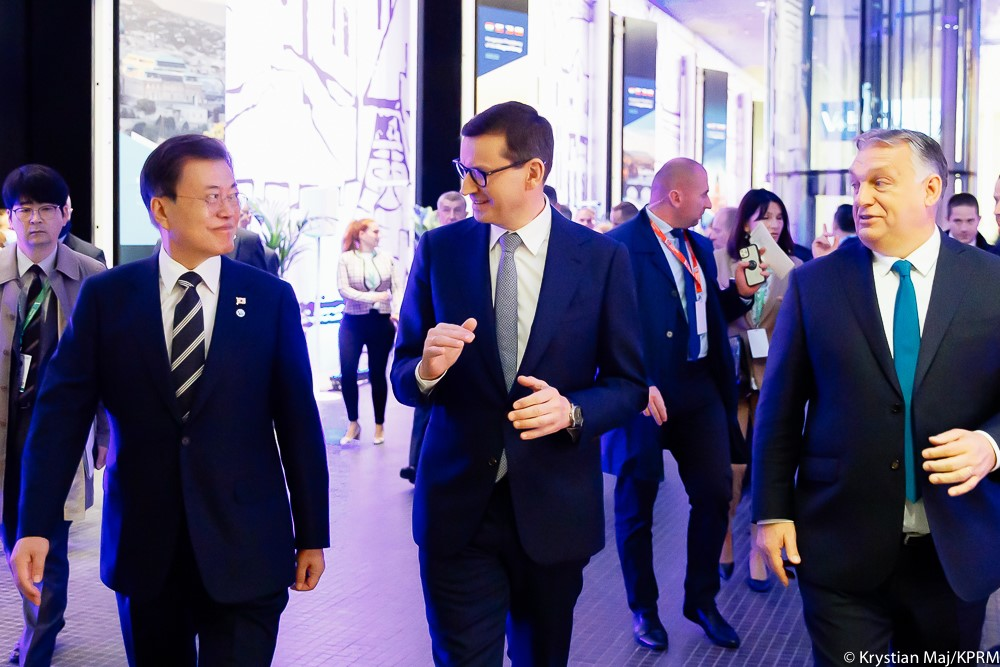
President of South Korea Moon Jae-in and Prime Ministers of Poland and Hungary at the Visegrád Group summit in Budapest in 2021

=== Sinking of Hableány (2019) ===
On 29 May 2019, a river cruiser called the Hableány sank, after being rammed by a larger river cruiser called the Viking Sigyn. The incident killed 25 of the 33 South Korean tourists on board the Hableány, and one remains missing (as of 15 August 2019).

The incident resulted in South Korea sending rescue workers to Budapest: some of them also took part in rescue operations following the Sewol disaster in 2014. South Korean foreign minister Kang Kyung-wha also travelled to Budapest, to visit the survivors and relatives of passengers on the Hableány.

== Resident diplomatic missions ==
- Hungary has an embassy in Seoul.
- South Korea has an embassy in Budapest.

== See also ==
- Foreign relations of Hungary
- Foreign relations of South Korea
