= High Commission of India, Islamabad =

Diplomatic mission of India in Pakistan

- Location: Islamabad, Pakistan
- Address: P4C5+RQG, Ramna 5 Diplomatic Enclave, Islamabad, Islamabad Capital Territory 44000, Pakistan
- Coordinates: 33°43′14.36″N 73°6′26.81″E
- Opened: 1947; 79 years ago
- Jurisdiction: Pakistan
- Chargé d'affaires: Geetika Srivastava, IFS
- Website: india.org.pk

The High Commission of the Republic of India in Islamabad is the diplomatic mission of India to Pakistan. From 1976 to 1989, 1999 to 2004, and 2007 to 2008, the mission was known as the Embassy of India, Islamabad due to Pakistan's withdrawal or suspension from the Commonwealth of Nations during those time periods. Indo-Pakistani diplomatic relations were suspended on two occasions, in 1971 due to the Indo-Pakistani war of 1971, and from 2001 to 2003 due to the 2001 Indian Parliament attack and 2001–2002 India–Pakistan standoff. In 2019, in response to India's revocation of the special status of Jammu and Kashmir, Pakistan downgraded diplomatic ties with India. Since then, the diplomatic mission is being headed by a chargé d'affaires. The incumbent charge d'affaires is Geetika Srivastava, who is also the first woman to head the Indian diplomatic mission to Pakistan.

== Location ==
The Indian High Commission is located in the G-5 Diplomatic Enclave, Islamabad.

== History ==
Sri Prakasa, an Indian freedom fighter and politician was appointed as the first Indian high commissioner to Pakistan upon the request of Jawaharlal Nehru. Prakasa had to deal with the influx of refugees amidst the Partition of India as well as the Indo-Pakistani war of 1947–1948. The original High Commission was located in Karachi, which was Pakistan's Federal Capital from 1947-1959.

The Indian High Commission moved to Islamabad in 1966 upon the relocation of Pakistan's capital city to Islamabad.

=== Diplomatic tensions ===
Amidst the Indo-Pakistani war of 1971, diplomatic relations between India and Pakistan were suspended as India recalled its High Commissioner from Pakistan. Diplomatic relations would be restored in 1976 and the Indian High Commissioner would return to Pakistan.

In 2001, in the aftermath of the 2001 Indian Parliament attack, India recalled its diplomatic mission from Islamabad. Diplomatic relations were restored in 2003.

In 2019, in response to India's revocation of the special status of Jammu and Kashmir, a meeting of the Pakistani National Security Committee decided to downgrade Pakistan's diplomatic relations with India. The High Commissioner to India was recalled and the Indian High Commissioner to Pakistan was expelled. Since then, India's High Commission in Islamabad is being headed by a Chargé d'affaires.

In 2025, following the Pahalgam attack, the Indian High Commission in Islamabad saw increased security concerns, including public protests near the mission. India withdrew its military advisers from the High Commission and reduced its staff from 55 to 30. These measures were part of broader diplomatic actions amid heightened India–Pakistan tensions, including reciprocal expulsions of military personnel and the suspension of key bilateral agreements, including the suspension of the Indus Water Treaty.

== See also ==
- List of high commissioners of India to Pakistan
- High Commission of Pakistan, New Delhi
- List of diplomatic missions of India
- List of diplomatic missions in Pakistan
- India–Pakistan relations
