= Embassy of North Korea, Islamabad =

Embassy of the Democratic People’s Republic of Korea in Islamabad
- Location: Islamabad
- Address: 200-A Street 50, Islamabad 44000 Street 50, F-10/4, Islamabad
- Coordinates: 33.68987°N 73.00801°E
- Ambassador: Kim Thae-sop

The Embassy of the Democratic People's Republic of Korea in Islamabad is the diplomatic mission of North Korea to Pakistan. As of 2018, Kim Thae-sop is the Ambassador to Pakistan. North Korea also maintains a Consulate-General in Karachi, Pakistan.

== History ==
In October, 2017 about $159,000 worth of alcohol was stolen from the private residence of First Secretary Hyon Ki-yong, which led to speculation that North Korea was using diplomatic access to bootleg alcohol, to send money back to North Korea.

== See also ==
- Consulate-General of North Korea, Karachi
- Foreign relations of North Korea
- List of diplomatic missions of North Korea
- North Korea–Pakistan relations
