= Korean embassy =

Korean embassy may refer to:

- List of diplomatic missions of North Korea
- List of diplomatic missions of South Korea
