= Korean diplomatic missions =

Korean diplomatic missions may refer to:

- Diplomatic missions of North Korea
- Diplomatic missions of South Korea
