= List of diplomatic missions in Pakistan =

This is a list of diplomatic missions in Pakistan. There are currently 83 diplomatic missions located in Islamabad, most of which are in the Diplomatic Enclave. Many countries maintain consulates in other Pakistani cities. Several countries have non-resident embassies accredited from other foreign capitals, such as Abu Dhabi, Ankara, Riyadh and Tehran.

This listing excludes honorary consulates.

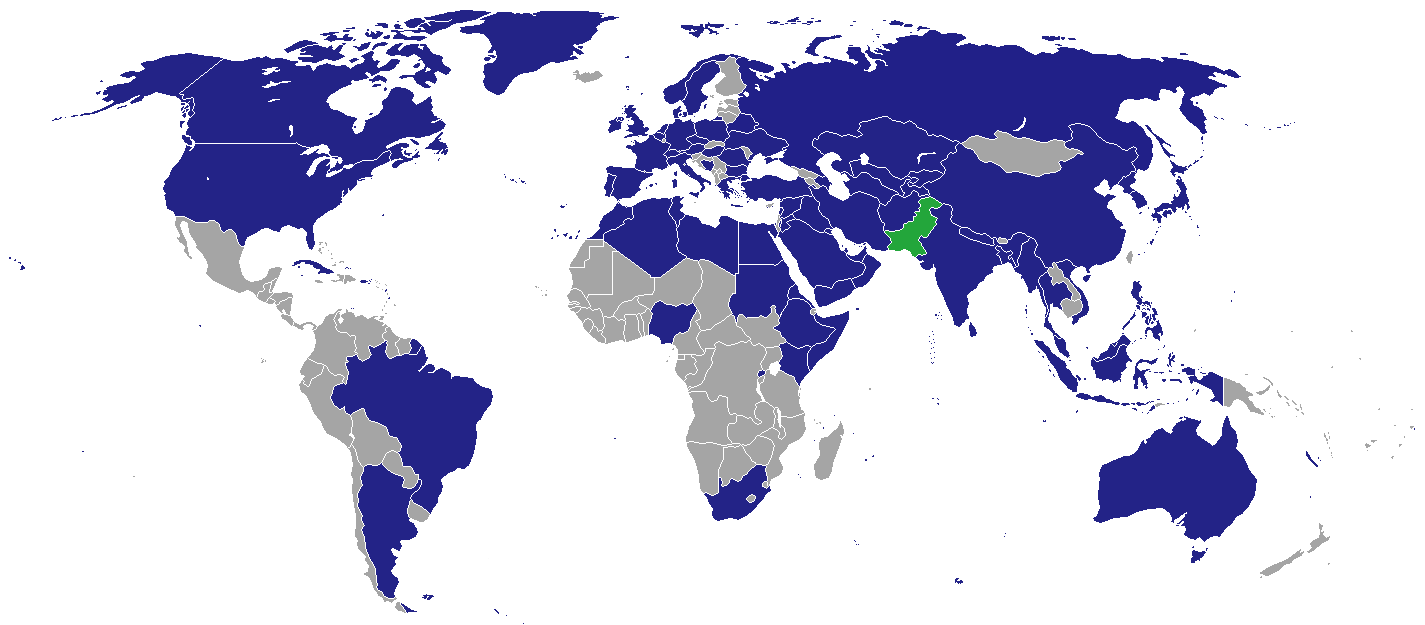
Map of diplomatic missions in Pakistan

== Diplomatic missions in Islamabad ==
=== Embassies and High Commissions ===
Entries marked with an asterisk (*) are member states of the Commonwealth of Nations. As such, their embassies are formally termed as "high commissions".

1. Afghanistan
2. Algeria
3. Argentina
4. Australia*
5. Austria
6. Azerbaijan
7. Bahrain
8. Bangladesh*
9. Belarus
10. Belgium
11. Bosnia and Herzegovina
12. Brazil
13. Brunei*
14. Bulgaria
15. Canada*
16. China
17. Cuba
18. Czech Republic
19. Denmark
20. Egypt
21. Eritrea
22. Ethiopia
23. France
24. Germany
25. Greece
26. Holy See
27. Hungary
28. India*
29. Indonesia
30. Iran
31. Iraq
32. Ireland
33. Italy
34. Japan
35. Jordan
36. Kazakhstan
37. Kenya*
38. Kuwait
39. Kyrgyzstan
40. Lebanon
41. Libya
42. Malaysia*
43. Maldives*
44. Mauritius*
45. Morocco
46. Myanmar
47. Nepal
48. Netherlands
49. Nigeria*
50. North Korea
51. Norway
52. Oman
53. Palestine
54. Philippines
55. Poland
56. Portugal
57. Qatar
58. Romania
59. Russia
60. Rwanda*
61. Saudi Arabia
62. Somalia
63. South Africa*
64. South Korea
65. Spain
66. Sri Lanka*
67. Sudan
68. Sweden
69. Switzerland
70. Syria
71. Tajikistan
72. Thailand
73. Tunisia
74. Turkey
75. Turkmenistan
76. Ukraine
77. United Arab Emirates
78. United Kingdom
79. United States
80. Uzbekistan
81. Vietnam
82. Yemen
83. Zimbabwe

=== Other missions or delegations ===
- European Union (Delegation)
- Northern Cyprus (Representative Office)

== Consular missions ==
=== Karachi ===
1. Afghanistan
2. Bangladesh (Deputy High Commission)
3. Bahrain
4. China
5. France
6. Germany
7. Indonesia
8. Iraq
9. Iran
10. Italy (Consulate)
11. Japan
12. Kuwait
13. Malaysia
14. North Korea (Consulate General)
15. Oman
16. Qatar
17. Russia
18. Saudi Arabia
19. South Korea
20. Sri Lanka
21. Thailand
22. Turkey
23. United Arab Emirates (Consulate-General)
24. United Kingdom (Deputy High Commission)
25. United States (Consulate-General)

=== Lahore ===
- China
- Iran
- Turkey
- United States (Consulate-General)

=== Peshawar ===
- Afghanistan
- Iran
- United States (Consulate General)

=== Quetta ===
- Afghanistan
- Iran

== Accredited embassies ==
Resident in Abu Dhabi, United Arab Emirates:

- Angola
- Armenia
- Chile
- Panama
- Seychelles
- Tanzania

Resident in Ankara, Turkey:

- Albania
- Colombia
- Ecuador
- Estonia
- Kosovo
- Latvia
- Lithuania
- Moldova
- Mongolia
- North Macedonia

Resident in Riyadh, Saudi Arabia:

- Burkina Faso
- Cameroon
- Chad
- Comoros
- Djibouti
- Equatorial Guinea
- Gambia
- Gabon
- Guinea
- Mali
- Mauritania
- Niger
- Republic of China (Taiwan)
- Singapore

Resident in Tehran, Iran:

- Cyprus
- Croatia
- Georgia
- Ghana
- Ivory Coast
- Mexico
- New Zealand
- Senegal
- Serbia
- Sierra Leone
- Slovakia
- Slovenia
- Uganda
- Uruguay
- Venezuela

Resident elsewhere:

- Bhutan (Dhaka)
- Cape Verde (Beijing)
- Central African Republic (Doha)
- Cambodia (New Delhi)
- Eswatini (Kuala Lumpur)
- Iceland (Oslo)
- Laos (Beijing)
- Madagascar (Port Louis)
- Malawi (Kuwait City)
- Malta (Valletta)
- Peru (Beijing)
- Paraguay (Cairo)
- Togo (Kuwait City)
- Tonga (Canberra)

== Closed missions ==
Host city	Sending country	Mission	Year closed	Ref.
Islamabad	Iceland	Embassy (Note: Resident in Oslo, Norway)	2002	
Islamabad	Mexico	Embassy	2009	
Islamabad	Finland	Embassy	2026	
Abbottabad	India	Consulate-General	1982	
Karachi	Bulgaria	Consulate-General	2019	
Karachi	India	Consulate	1994	
Karachi	Morocco	Consulate	2012	
Karachi	Poland	Consulate-General	2008	
Karachi	Sweden	Consulate	1973	
Karachi	Switzerland	Consulate	2017	

== See also ==
- Foreign relations of Pakistan
- List of diplomatic missions of Pakistan
- List of diplomatic missions in Karachi
- List of diplomatic visits to Pakistan since 2024
- Visa requirements for Pakistani citizens
