= Embassy of China, Pyongyang =

Coordinates: 39.05433°N 125.75269°E

Embassy of the People's Republic of China in the Democratic People's Republic of Korea 中华人民共和国 驻朝鲜民主主义人民共和国大使馆
- Location: Kinmaul-dong, Moranbong District, Pyongyang
- Ambassador: Wang Yajun
- Website: kp.china-embassy.org

The Embassy of the People's Republic of China in the Democratic People's Republic of Korea is the diplomatic mission of the People's Republic of China in North Korea. The embassy is located in Kinmaul-dong, the Moranbong District of Pyongyang . The embassy currently provides a number of consular services, namely passport and visa related.

The Embassy of China Pyongyang is one of two Chinese representatives in North Korea, the second being the Chinese Consulate in Chongjin. The Chinese Embassy in Pyongyang represents one of 229 consular and diplomatic missions of China all over the world.

== Location ==
The Embassy of China in North Korea is one of 25 active diplomatic missions in North Korea and is situated in Kinmaul-Dong, Moranbong District, Pyongyang North Korea. The Chinese embassy is one of three embassies located outside of the Munsu-dong diplomatic compound, the others being the Embassy of Russia in Pyongyang and the Embassy of Pakistan in Pyongyang. The unique location of these embassies is said to be due to their larger size compared to those embassies situated within the diplomatic compound.

== History ==
Throughout the early 1950s, shortly after the entry of the United States of America in the Korean War, US bombing runs began to target Pyongyang more frequently. In July 1950, the delegates at the Chinese Embassy of Pyongyang were forced to leave the embassy over fears of bombs striking the embassy itself. It was reported that no Chinese diplomats were harmed. At the height of the US bombing raids, the Chinese chargé d'affaires asked Zhou Enlai, the first premier of the People's Republic of China, if the embassy should be outfitted with anti-aircraft weaponry. The embassy further commented that they were "struggling to continue to work during punishing bombings". However, after the war's conclusion in July 1953, the Chinese Embassy was later dubbed the "de facto coordinator of other proletarian embassies in North Korea".

In 1958, an agreement was made between China and North Korea to allow the travel of high level personnel between the two countries in order to establish previously disbanded communication channels. After the purging of the Yan'an faction from the North Korean government, Chinese-Korean relations were at a low after Kim Il Sung reportedly showed concern for his own faction, the Manchurian Faction, and felt its position in the Korean government was challenged. After a visit by Chinese diplomat Zhou Enlai to the Chinese Embassy in Pyongyang, an agreement dubbed the "Agreement Concerning Mutual Visits of Leaders between China and North Korea" was written. This agreement stipulated that the political leaders of both countries would regularly visit the other to consult on key policy directives, war efforts and other areas of key concern. This agreement is still in place as of May 2021 and since its instillment, it is reported that there has been a large number of recorded visits from high ranking Chinese officials to North Korea, primarily working out of the embassy in Pyongyang.

On March 5, 2000, in a rare event, North Korean Supreme Leader Kim Jong Il visited the Chinese Embassy of Pyongyang for "the occasion of the new year, and at the request of the Chinese Ambassador to North Korea, Wan Yongxiang".

On March 4, 2007, Kim Jong Il spent the annual Lantern Festival with Chinese consulates and diplomats at the embassy of China in Pyongyang. This visit was heralded as an "unprecedented gesture" and dubbed an "unusual move" to repair relations with China and to also display the willingness to repair diplomatic relations between China and North Korea to the global community.

On August 22, 2007, a week after weeks of torrential rain caused widespread flooding in North Korea, the Chinese Embassy of Pyongyang announced that China's Red Cross foundation would pledge $50,000 worth of relief supplies. This aid was part of China's broader aid package, which included further aid supplies as well as the dispatchment of Chinese relief teams to affected areas.

In March 2007, after a meeting with China's Head of Central International Liaison, Wang Jiariu, at the Chinese Embassy in Pyongyang, Kim Jong Il reaffirmed his position to enhance Chinese-North Korean relations. In March 2008 made a further diplomatic gesture by visiting the Chinese Embassy in Pyongyang. This was said to be a continuation of the first meeting a year beforehand and a symbolic gesture of continued goodwill and continual commitment to the betterment of Chinese-North Korean relations.

In April 2010, after the great Dandong flood, the Chinese Embassy released a statement stating that North Korea owed Chinese investors a sum of around US$230 million after construction projects were wiped away by flash floods.

In May 2010, it was alleged by the Chinese government that the Chinese embassy in Pyongyang had been unable to conduct ordinary intelligence gathering duties that were routinely conducted by its other international counterparts. This is reportedly due to a lack of trust between the two countries.

On May 20, 2010, the Chinese ambassador Liu Hongcai brought together major Chinese firms to the Chinese embassy in Pyongyang to pledge his enhanced support for their efforts. It was reported that this was to help legitimise the number of Chinese workers immigrating to North Korea as well as helping to combat the illegal entry of Chinese workers. This was reportedly after political tensions began to arise surrounding the fear of Chinese firms exploiting North Korea and circumventing its laws. In April 2010, the embassy began hosting regular events to introduce Chinese firms to both DPRK officials and visiting Chinese officials, at which Ambassador Liu Hongcai urged Chinese firms to "respect North Korea's national conditions, abide by its laws, and conduct business in ways to promote friendship and understanding between the two countries."

After the anniversary of the Korean war, on 15 June 2010, the Chinese Embassy in Pyongyang announced that China and North Korea will together be producing a film to mark the historic anniversary.

In March 2011, the embassy of China in Pyongyang released a statement commenting that the increased levels of trade and construction work in North Korea has led to increased amounts of accidents involving Chinese citizens. The statement further warned about the use of illegal agencies to import Chinese workers, after announcing that "whoever brings in the workers is responsible for them".

Following the death of North Korea's Supreme Leader, Kim Jong-Il, the Chinese embassy in Pyongyang offered condolences on behalf of China, carrying the full letter of condolence telegram to the Democratic Peoples Republic of Korea leadership party in December 2011.

Following the death of Kim Jong-Il, Chinese analysts reported in mid-February 2011 that they were satisfied with the current political situation in North Korea. It was further recorded that through high level meetings with senior North Korean officials at the Chinese Embassy in Pyongyang, including meetings with Kim Jong-Un, that Chinese-North Korean relations were becoming increasingly stable.

In January 2017, DPRK officials attended Lunar New Year reception at Chinese Embassy in Pyongyang, a symbolic gesture of good will.

On April 4, 2017, the People's Republic of China Ambassador Li Jinjun leads the Chinese Embassy delegation to ceremonies in Pyongyang commemorating Chinese People's Volunteer Army members killed during the Korean War.

In April 2018, the Supreme Leader of North Korea, Kim Jong-un, visited the Chinese embassy to reportedly express his "deep sympathy" over a recent bus accident that killed a confirmed 32 Chinese tourists and critically injured two. The fatal accident occurred the Sunday prior when the bus drove off a bridge in the North Hwanghae Province. It was recorded that four North Koreans had also been killed in the accident.

== Departments ==
The Chinese Embassy in Pyongyang has various different departments and offers a range of services due in part to the large Chinese population living in North Korea. The embassy includes an educational office, a science and technology office, an economic and commercial office, a defence attaché office, an administrative office and a political office.

The embassy also supports the local North Korean citizens by offering a wide range of consular services, the main services offered being:

- Getting in touch with specific contacts or sending information to China
- Informational services regarding the attainment of a Chinese visa and/or passport
- The process of applying for a Chinese visa
- Offering general information regarding the Chinese economy, sports, education system and Chinese culture.

China's Economic and Commercial Counsellor at the embassy in Pyongyang is also responsible for liaising with China's Department of Foreign aid with regards to preparing annual relief packages to the Democratic Peoples Republic of North Korea, which has been categorised as a reliable way to enhance bilateral relations between the two countries and promote Chinese business within North Korea. Relief packages have been consistently been provided to North Korea since China sent over US$1.2 million in aid after a railway explosion killed 161 people and injured Kim Jong Il in 2004.

== Security threats ==
On 6 April 2020, a major cyber-attack on the Chinese Government saw a hacking group known as "DarkHotel" gain access to embassy data from the Chinese Embassy of Pyongyang, as well as over a dozen other locations worldwide. The attack was successful due in part to the "very old" security practices and infrastructure used by the embassy. The hackers then leaked "a large amount of sensitive data" reportedly surrounding supply and medical data.

== See also ==
- Embassy of North Korea, Beijing
- Consulate-General of China, Chongjin
- List of diplomatic missions of China
- List of diplomatic missions in North Korea
- Foreign relations of China
