= 2005 Islamabad bombing =

Terror attack in Pakistan

On 27 May 2005, a suicide bombing in Islamabad, Pakistan killed about 20 people and wounded about 150 others. The attack occurred inside the shrine of the city's patron saint, Bari Imam, which is located in Noorpur Shahan, between the city's 3rd and 4th avenues. At the time of the explosion, thousands of Sunni and Shia Muslim worshippers were attending a festival at the shrine.

== Bari Imam ==
Shah Abdul Latif Kazmi alias Bari Imam is a famous Sufi saint of 17th century. He was a prominent figure if Qadiriyya order of Sufism. He is considered as patron saint of Islamabad.

== See also ==
- 2002 Islamabad Protestant International Church bombing
