= Diplomatic missions of Korea =

Diplomatic missions of Korea may refer to:

- Diplomatic missions of North Korea
- Diplomatic missions of South Korea
