= North Korea–Pakistan relations =

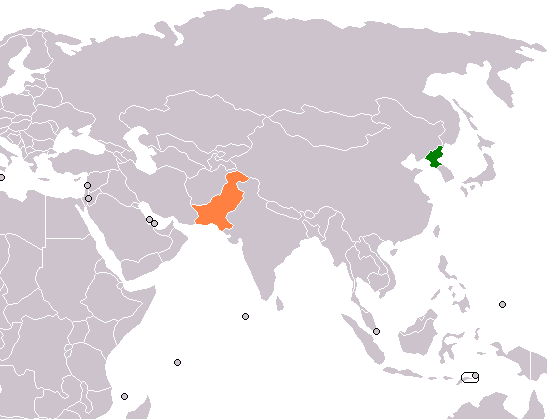

- North Korea: Pakistan

Pakistan has both diplomatic and economic relationships with North Korea. The start of relations between the two countries emerged sometime in the 1970s during the democratic prime ministerialship of Prime Minister Zulfikar Ali Bhutto, when he made a state visit to North Korea as part of his foreign policy campaign to strengthen the relations with socialist states. Pakistan has an embassy in Pyongyang while North Korea maintains an embassy in Islamabad, a vast Consulate-General in Karachi, and consulates in other cities of Pakistan.

Pakistani public opinion towards North Korea seem to be largely divided, with 27% viewing it positively and 27% expressing a negative view.

== History ==
=== Iran–Iraq war ===
Pakistan is believed to have also been forging alliances between North Korea, Iran and Libya. During the Iran–Iraq War, North Korea and Pakistan supported Iran. North Korean made weapons and military equipment were shipped to the Pakistani port city of Karachi from where they were transported by land and escorted by the Pakistan armed forces to the Iranian border. The Iranian state then used them to strike at Iraqi targets.

=== Allegations of nuclear assistance by Pakistan ===
Pakistan has been accused by US officials of having secretly supplied North Korea with nuclear technology for military purposes. The CIA claimed to have tracked several air shipments between the two countries via satellite. The US Government believes that A. Q. Khan, a senior atomic research scientist, had travelled to North Korea several times and provided crucial technological aid to the North Korean government to create HEU.

==== 2002 scandal ====
In 2002, information leaked that Pakistan had been the source of North Korea's recent development in nuclear warheads, according to US intelligence officials. Abdul Qadeer Khan was placed under house arrest by the Pakistan government and was made to publicly apologize to the Pakistan public for "embarrassing" the country. The Pakistani government declined repeated calls for weapons inspectors to investigate Pakistan's nuclear facilities or any attempts for the CIA to directly question Khan, despite growing Western pressure.

== Trade relations ==
Pakistan is said to have had long-time economical relations with the North Korean government since the early 1970s.

Faced with having a weakened economy during the 1990s and China's reluctance to face Western pressure about selling its M-11 missiles, Pakistan sought an alternate supplier, in this case North Korea.

Benazir Bhutto had met with North Korean officials on several occasions during the 1990s to discuss a deal that would give Pakistan access to the North Korean Rodong long-range missiles. In return, Pakistan would supply North Korea with civilian nuclear technology instead of money, due to lack of funds. The exchanges between the two countries were confidential and secretive. North Korea also has a consulate in Karachi. As close allies of the People's Republic of China, North Korea and Pakistan have been cooperating with each other in educational and cultural exchanges.

== See also ==
- Foreign relations of North Korea
- Foreign relations of Pakistan
- North Korea and weapons of mass destruction
- Pakistan and weapons of mass destruction
