= List of diplomatic missions in Karachi =

By the time of Pakistan's independence in 1947, Karachi had become a bustling metropolis with slightly under half a million people, and classical and colonial European styled buildings lining the city's thoroughfares. Karachi, the capital of Sindh province was also chosen as the capital of Pakistan. In 1958, the capital of Pakistan was moved from Karachi to Rawalpindi. The foreign embassies in Karachi moved to the newly developed capital Islamabad, near Rawalpindi. There are Consulates and Honorary Consulates as Diplomatic missions in the actual Federal Capital of Pakistan, Karachi.

This is a list of Consulates-General in Karachi, Sindh, Pakistan. The embassies in Pakistan are located in the Diplomatic Enclave in the capital, Islamabad.

== Career Consulates ==
- Afghanistan Consulate General
- Bahrain Consulate General
- Bangladesh Deputy High Commission
- China Consulate General
- France Consulate General
- Germany Consulate General
- Indonesia Consulate General
- Iran Consulate General
- Italy Consulate General of Italy in Karachi
- Japan Consulate General
- Kuwait Consulate General
- Malaysia Consulate General
- North Korea Consulate General
- Oman Consulate General
- Pakistan Consulate General
- Qatar Consulate General
- Russia Consulate General
- Saudi Arabia Consulate General
- Sri Lanka Consulate General
- South Korea Branch Office
- Thailand Consulate General
- Turkey Consulate General
- United Arab Emirates Consulate General
- United Kingdom Deputy High Comimission
- United States Consulate General

== See also ==
- List of diplomatic missions of Pakistan
- Foreign relations of Pakistan
- Visa requirements for Pakistani citizens
