= Embassy of North Korea, Beijing =

Embassy of the Democratic People’s Republic of Korea in Beijing
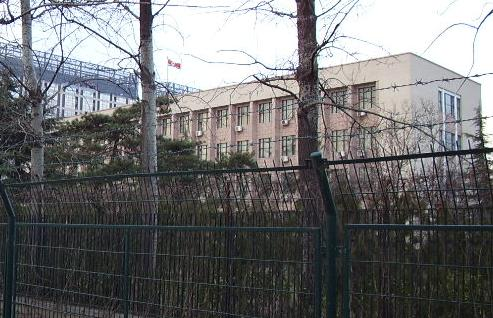
- Location: Chaoyang, Beijing, China
- Address: No. 11, Ri Tan Bei Lu, Jian Guo Men Wai, Chaoyang District
- Coordinates: 39.9172°N 116.439°E
- Opening: September 6, 1986; 40 years ago
- Ambassador: Ri Ryong-nam

The Embassy of the Democratic People's Republic of Korea in Beijing is the diplomatic mission of North Korea to China. It is located in Chaoyang, Beijing. In addition to its embassy in Beijing, North Korea also has consulates in Dandong and Shenyang. It is one of the largest embassies of North Korea and has dormitories, North Korean grocery shops, a currency exchange, an eyeglasses store, and a fruit and vegetable shop. As of 2021, the ambassador is Ri Ryong-nam.

== History ==
The embassy was established on 6 September 1986. Shortly after opening, following the rumoured death of Kim Il Sung, the North Korean embassy in Beijing released a statement saying the accusation was groundless but it did close to all visitors for a number of days before Kim's actual death. In 2017, it was alleged that due to being short of funding, the North Korean embassy were selling weapons to Mozambique as well as machine tools to Chinese customers from within the embassy grounds. It had been reported that North Korean embassy backed restaurants in Beijing were deliberately expelling South Korean tourists from them when their nationality was discovered. The North Korean embassy has also used diplomatic pressures to have South Korean exhibitions removed from being displayed within Beijing.

In 2017, NK News reported that the embassy was building a hotel for visiting North Koreans. The hotel reportedly neared completion in early 2018. These included holding parties to celebrate the birthdays of former North Korean leaders. In 2025, the North Korean embassy and the Chinese Embassy in Pyongyang agreed to expand economic and social interactions in order to further extend Sino-North Korean relations. In September 2025, while visiting China to attend the 2025 Victory Day Parade, Kim Jong Un stayed at the embassy.

== Ambassadors ==
- Lee Ju Yon
- Kwon Ogik
- Choi Il
- Lee Yong Ho
- Pak Se chang
- Hyon Joon Guk
- Chon Myong Soo
- Shin Inha
- Ju Chang Joon
- Choi Jin Soo
- Choi Byong Gwan
- Ji Jae Ryong
- Ri Ryong-nam (Current)

== Gallery ==
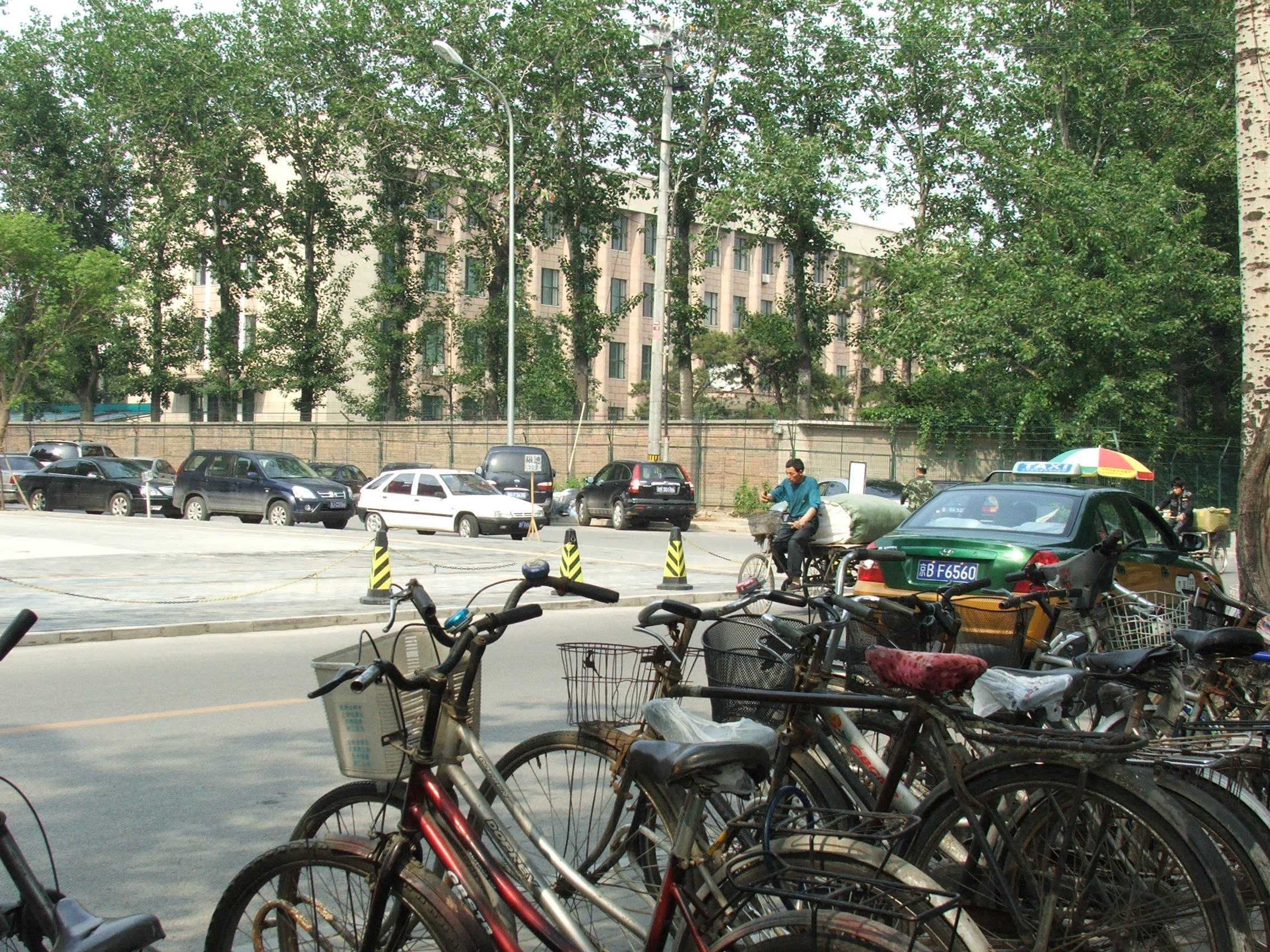
North Korean embassy

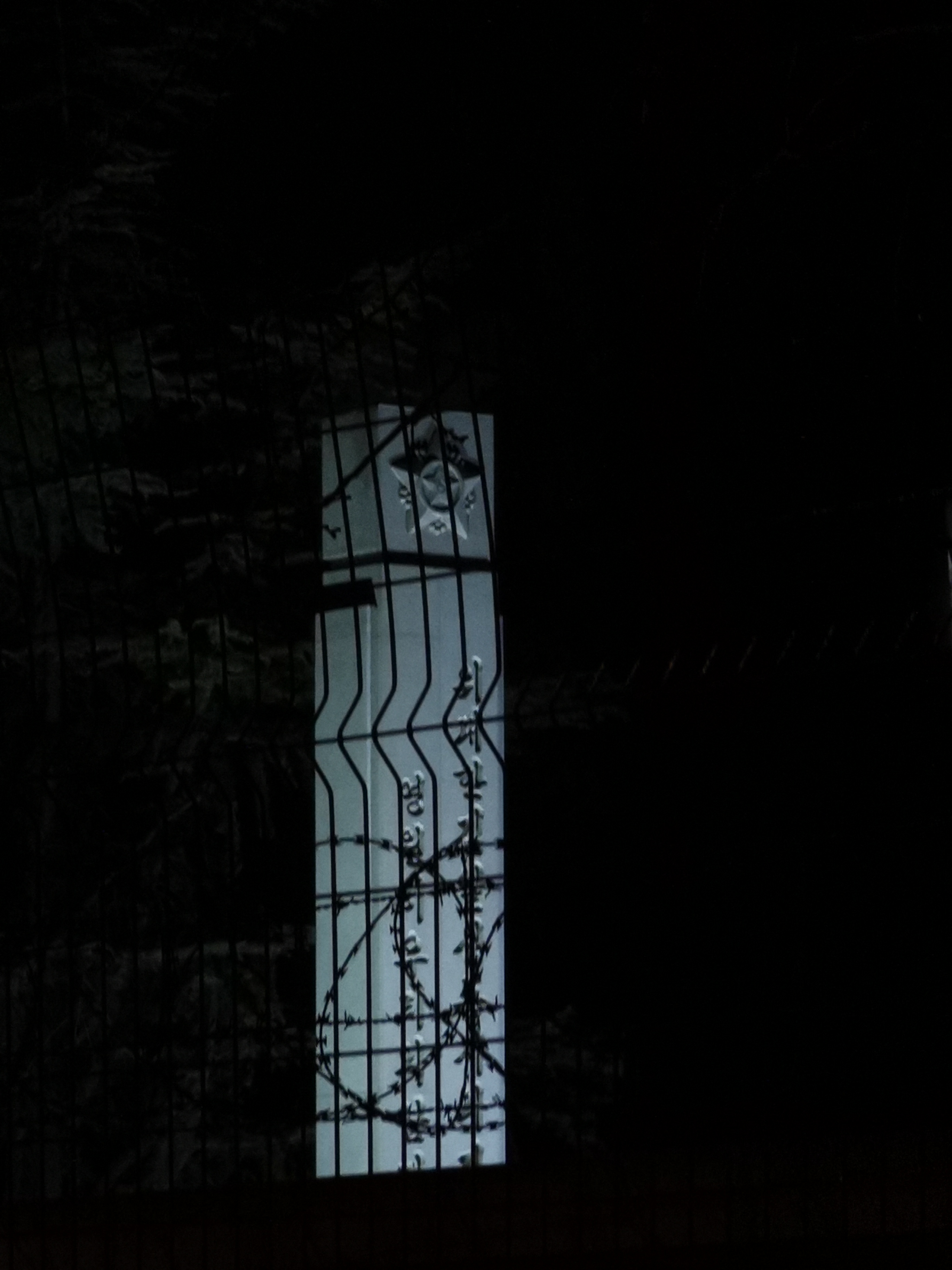
Immortality Tower inside the North Korean embassy

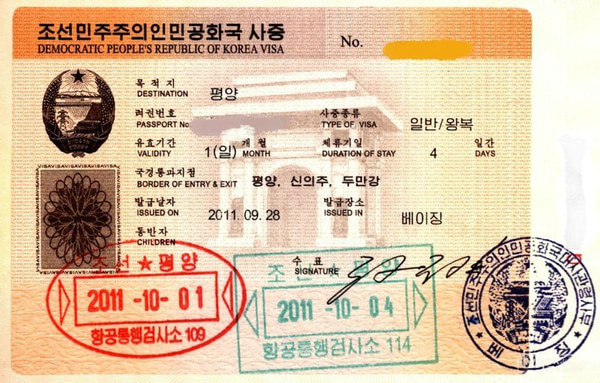
Travel visas given by North Korean embassy

== See also ==
- Embassy of China, Pyongyang
- List of diplomatic missions of North Korea
- List of diplomatic missions in China
- Foreign relations of North Korea
