= Embassy of North Korea, Dhaka =

Diplomatic mission in Bangladesh

Embassy of the Democratic People's Republic of Korea, Dhaka, Bangladesh
- Location: Dhaka, Bangladesh
- Coordinates: 23.79712°N 90.40266°E
- Opened: c. 1974
- Closed: November 20, 2023
- Ambassador: Pak Song Yop

The Embassy of the Democratic People's Republic of Korea in Dhaka (Korean: 주 방글라데시 조선민주주의인민공화국 대사관; MR: Chu Panggŭlladeshi Chosŏn Minjujuŭi Inmin Konghwaguk Daesagwan) was the diplomatic mission of the Democratic People's Republic of Korea to the People's Republic of Bangladesh, located in Dhaka. It was opened in 1974, a year after North Korea established diplomatic ties with Bangladesh. The embassy was closed on 20 November 2023 in order for North Korea to better manage its operations in South Asia through its embassy in New Delhi, due to a financial crisis hitting the country since the COVID-19 pandemic.

== History ==
Bangladesh and North Korea established diplomatic ties with one another in 1973. This was followed by the opening of the North Korean embassy in Dhaka the subsequent year. However, cooperation with each other was generally limited and there were no notable trade relations. There were instances of North Korean diplomats being caught smuggling items in 2015 and 2016. On 8 August 2016, the first secretary of the embassy, Han Son Ik, was deported from Bangladesh for violating diplomatic norms after a shipping container with illegally smuggled cigarettes and electronics was seized by local officials.

As a financial crisis hit North Korea as a result of the COVID-19 pandemic, North Korea shut several embassies down in Angola, Bangladesh, the Democratic Republic of the Congo, Guinea, Hong Kong, Nepal, Senegal, Spain, and Uganda at the end of 2023. The one in Bangladesh was closed on 20 November, and North Korean diplomats departed the country the following day. This was the sixth North Korean embassy to be closed since late October, and the second in South Asia after the embassy in Nepal. Although North Korea stated that they would reopen the embassy in the future, it would continue to maintain relations with Bangladesh through its embassy in New Delhi, like how Bangladesh manages their relations with North Korea through the Bangladeshi embassy in Beijing, China.

== See also ==
- Bangladesh–North Korea relations
- List of diplomatic missions of North Korea
