= Bangladesh–North Korea relations =

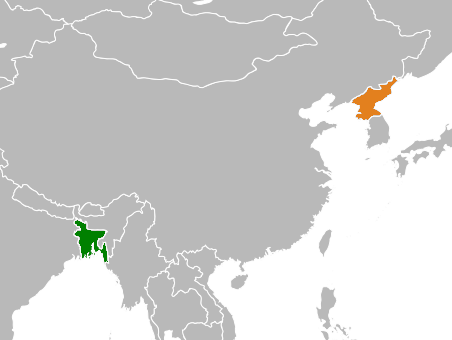

- Bangladesh: North Korea

Bangladesh–North Korea relations refer to the bilateral relations between Bangladesh and North Korea.

== History ==
North Korea had a resident embassy in Bangladesh. Bangladesh ambassador to China also represents Bangladesh in North Korea. In 2012, a North Korean diplomat was fined 2.5 million taka for the possession of illegal wine. North Korea has a branch of its Pyongyang Restaurant chain in Dhaka. The restaurant is staffed by North Korean personnel and serves North Korean cuisine. In May 2015, the restaurant manager, a North Korean national was arrested for selling illegal Viagra and alcohol out of the restaurant. Following a raid at the restaurant, an assistant director of Customs Intelligence called the restaurant "a hub of illicit activities".

In March 2015, a North Korean diplomat, Son Young-nam, was expelled from Bangladesh after he was caught trying to smuggle 1.7 million dollars' worth of gold, which was seized in the airport. The North Korean ambassador to Bangladesh apologized after the incident.

Symantec and BAE Systems had found involvement of North Korea in the 2016 Bangladesh Bank heist through the hacking of the bank. In August 2016, Han Son Ik, first secretary of the North Korean embassy, was expelled for "illegal activities". He was found to be smuggling cigarettes and electronics worth half a million dollars. In January 2017, a Rolls-Royce Han had bought in Bangladesh was seized by Bangladesh Customs.

== Economic relations ==
Bangladesh imported $34.8 million worth of goods from North Korea, while North Korea imported $5.31 million worth of goods from Bangladesh in 2002.
