= Consulate-General of North Korea, Karachi =

The Consulate-General of North Korea in Karachi (Note: Korean: 주카라치 조선민주주의인민공화국 총영사관; Urdu: شمالی کوریائی قونصل خانہ، کراچی; Sindhi: اُتَر ڪوريا قونصل خانو، ڪراچي) is a diplomatic mission of North Korea in Pakistan.

== Consular services ==
The consulate is primarily concerned with economic, business and commercial relations, and works under the North Korean embassy in Islamabad. The consulate building is a small "compound with flags flapping at the gate" and has a "discreet, unobtrusive" presence. Various consulate staff are posted in the mission.

== See also ==
- List of diplomatic missions of North Korea
- List of diplomatic missions in Karachi
- North Korea–Pakistan relations
