= List of diplomatic missions in North Korea =

This is a list of diplomatic missions in North Korea.

== Embassies ==
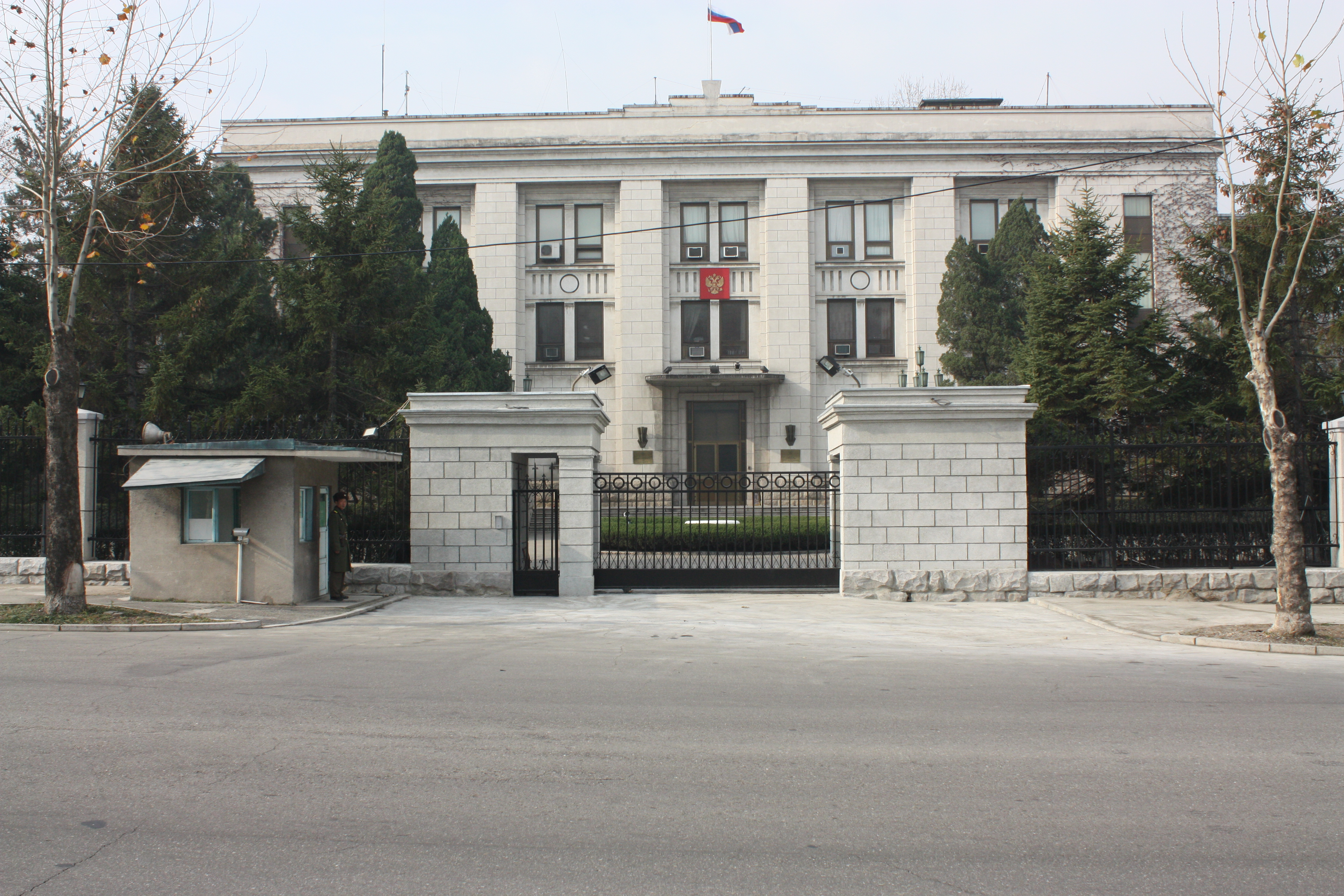
The Russian Embassy, located outside of the Munsu-dong Diplomatic Compound.

The following countries have embassies in Pyongyang:

1. Belarus
2. Brazil
3. Bulgaria
4. Cambodia
5. China
6. Cuba
7. Czechia
8. Egypt
9. India
10. Indonesia
11. Iran
12. Laos
13. Mongolia
14. Nicaragua
15. Nigeria
16. Palestine
17. Poland
18. Russia
19. Sweden
20. Syria
21. Venezuela
22. Vietnam

Most embassies are located in a special area of the city, known as the Munsu-dong Diplomatic Compound (문수동 외교단지 or 외국공관단지). The Russian, Chinese, and Pakistani embassies are located outside the diplomatic compound, as they are much larger than the other embassies.

The former East German embassy is the center of activity in the diplomatic quarter, as it houses the British, German, and Swedish embassies. Sweden acts as the protecting power for Australia, Canada, and the United States, provides consular services for the Nordic countries, and handles visa applications for Italy and Spain.

EU countries' consulates provide consular assistance for all EU countries. The British embassy provides consular assistance to any Commonwealth citizen whose country is not represented in North Korea, except for those whose governments have opted out of this arrangement.

== Offices ==
- Switzerland (Diplomatic Office)

== Consulates general ==
In Chongjin

- China
- Russia

== Former embassies and offices ==
Kaesong

- South Korea (Inter-Korean Liaison Office) The Inter-Korean Liaison Office was demolished by North Korea on 16 June 2020.

Pyongyang

- Albania (date unknown) (Note: Resident in Beijing, China)
- Australia (Note: The embassy was closed on 8 November 1975 following inter-governmental problems and Australian staff were withdrawn.)
- France (French Cooperation Bureau)
- Germany
- Hungary (closed in 1999)
- Libya (closed in 2013)
- Malaysia (closed in 2021) (Note: Malaysian embassy operations were suspended in 2017 due to the assassination of Kim Jong-nam and ceased in 2021 following the severance of Malaysia–North Korea relations.)
- Romania
- Yugoslavia (Note: Croatian, North Macedonian, Slovenian and Serbian resident in Beijing, China)

== Non-resident embassies ==
The following countries have non-resident embassies:

=== Resident in Beijing ===
- Albania
- Algeria
- Azerbaijan
- Bangladesh
- Brunei
- Central African Republic
- Cameroon
- Chile
- Colombia
- Chad
- Croatia
- Cyprus
- Ethiopia
- Gambia
- Hungary
- Iceland
- Ivory Coast
- Jordan
- Jamaica
- Kazakhstan
- Lebanon
- Libya
- Mali
- Maldives
- Malta
- Malawi
- Myanmar
- North Macedonia
- Oman
- Peru
- Philippines
- Qatar
- Rwanda
- Saudi Arabia
- Senegal
- Singapore
- Sierra Leone
- Seychelles
- Slovenia
- Serbia
- South Africa
- Sri Lanka
- Sudan
- South Sudan
- Switzerland
- Thailand
- Turkmenistan
- Tanzania
- Togo
- Tajikistan
- Tunisia
- Zambia
- Zimbabwe

=== Resident in Seoul ===
- Australia
- Austria
- Belgium
- Canada
- Denmark
- Finland
- Greece
- Guatemala
- Ireland
- Italy
- Mexico
- Netherlands
- New Zealand
- Norway
- Portugal
- Spain
- Turkey
- United Arab Emirates

=== Resident in Tokyo ===
- Benin

== See also ==
- Foreign relations of North Korea
- List of diplomatic missions of North Korea
