= 2002 Islamabad Protestant International Church bombing =

Terror attack in Pakistan

- Location: 33.72599638050933°N 73.12390916508454°E
- Date: March 17, 2002
- Attack type: Grenade attack
- Weapon: Grenades
- Deaths: 5
- Injuries: 41
- No. of participants: at least 1

The attack on the Protestant International Church in Islamabad, Pakistan, on 17 March 2002, killed five people and wounded more than 40 others. The attack occurred at the nondenominational church in the diplomatic enclave, just 400 yards from the United States embassy. On Sunday morning, three men entered the lightly guarded church and commenced the attack by throwing several grenades.

Two Americans, Barbara Green, a human resources employee at the embassy, and her seventeen-year-old daughter, Kristen Wormsley, a senior at the American school, were killed. Barbara's husband, Milton Green, a diplomat and director of the embassy's computer section, and their young son were also injured. One Pakistani citizen and an Afghan were also killed. The fifth victim, suspected to be one of the attackers, remains unidentified as much of his body was blown away. The attack appeared to target Americans and the government of President Pervez Musharraf. President Bush condemned the attack as "acts of murder that cannot be tolerated by any person of conscience", while President Musharraf called it a "ghastly act of terrorism".

== See also ==
- Daniel Pearl
