= Diplomatic Enclave, Islamabad =

Cordoned sector in Islamabad, Pakistan

Diplomatic Enclave سفارتی محصور علاقہ
- Sector
- Interactive map of Diplomatic Enclave
- Country: Pakistan
- Territory: Capital Territory
- Zone: I

Government
  - Body: Islamabad Metropolitan Corporation

Diplomatic Enclave (Urdu: سفارتی محصور علاقہ) is a secure zone in Islamabad, Pakistan which contains diplomatic missions. The enclave is located in Sector G-5 and houses 43 embassies and high commissions. The secure zone is not accessible to the general public without a pass.

== History ==
The Diplomatic Enclave was created in the 1960s during the planned development of Islamabad as Pakistan's new capital city. During construction, it allocated 56 plots for embassies to be built upon. Since the initial establishment, the Diplomatic Enclave has increased in size. A 2011 expansion as a result of a request from the Embassy of the People's Republic of China for a new visa processing centre. The grant of land was made but due to it encroaching upon Malpur, compensation had to be paid by the Pakistani government to 20 families. Construction on the land is restricted and in 2025, the Chief Commissioner of Islamabad announced that any illegal encroachment into the Diplomatic Enclave would be demolished.

Access to the Diplomatic Enclave without a pass is granted only through official transport. Private contractors running the transport was previously permitted however complaints were made that this was being abused by the drivers, in that visa applicants were being overcharged for the journeys. In 2024, the Capital Development Authority took over the running of official transport to the Enclave. In 2025, the Islamabad Capital Territory Police announced that all embassy employees within the Enclave, must wear their ID passes.

== See also ==
- List of diplomatic missions in Pakistan
- 2002 Islamabad Protestant International Church bombing
