= List of diplomatic missions of North Korea =

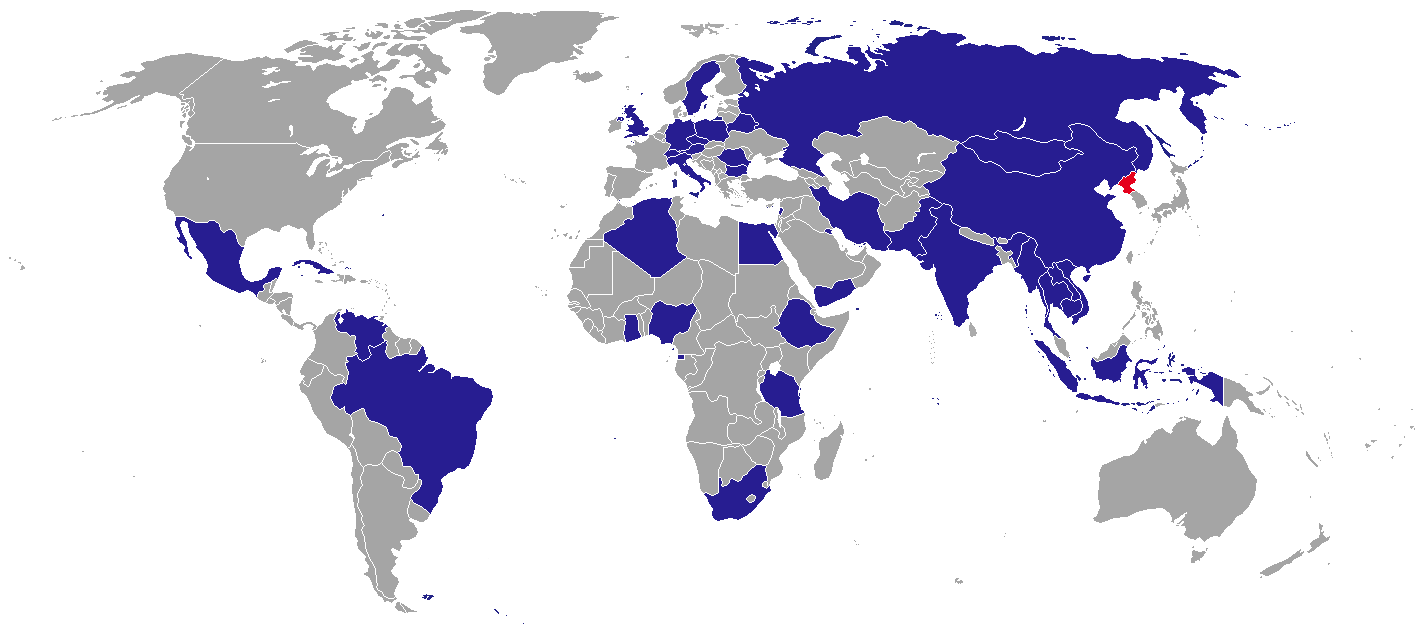
North Korea (red) and its diplomatic missions (blue)

This is a list of diplomatic missions of North Korea.

In the Cold War era its foreign policy was focused on the Soviet bloc countries, while it actively courted allies in the developing world. This was more out of political necessity, as North Korea competed with South Korea for diplomatic recognition. Eventually countries began recognizing both governments on the Korean Peninsula, and North Korea's missions in the developing world are more concerned with running aid programs and maintaining political mileage than obtaining any economic benefits.

== Current missions ==
=== Africa ===
Host country	Host city	Mission	Concurrent accreditation	Ref.
Algeria	Algiers	Embassy		
Egypt	Cairo	Embassy	Countries: Oman	
Equatorial Guinea	Malabo	Embassy		
Ethiopia	Addis Ababa	Embassy	Countries: South Sudan	
Nigeria	Abuja	Embassy	Countries: Togo	
South Africa	Pretoria	Embassy	Countries: Lesotho; Mauritius; Mozambique; Namibia; Zimbabwe	
Tanzania	Dar es Salaam	Embassy		

=== Americas ===
Host country	Host city	Mission	Concurrent accreditation	Ref.
Brazil	Brasília	Embassy		
Cuba	Havana	Embassy	Countries: Belize; Dominican Republic; Trinidad and Tobago	
Mexico	Mexico City	Embassy	Countries: Guatemala	
Venezuela	Caracas	Embassy		

=== Asia ===
Host country	Host city	Mission	Concurrent accreditation	Ref.
Cambodia	Phnom Penh	Embassy		
China	Beijing	Embassy		
China	Shenyang	Consulate General		
China	Dandong	Consular Office		
India	New Delhi	Embassy		
Indonesia	Jakarta	Embassy	Countries: New Zealand	
Iran	Tehran	Embassy		
Japan	Tokyo	General Association		
Kuwait	Kuwait City	Embassy	Countries: Bahrain	
Laos	Vientiane	Embassy		
Mongolia	Ulaanbaatar	Embassy		
Myanmar	Yangon	Embassy		
Pakistan	Islamabad	Embassy		
Pakistan	Karachi	Consulate General		
Thailand	Bangkok	Embassy		
Singapore	Singapore	Embassy		
Vietnam	Hanoi	Embassy		
Yemen	Sanaa	Embassy		

=== Europe ===
Host country	Host city	Mission	Concurrent accreditation	Ref.
Austria	Vienna	Embassy	Countries: Hungary; Slovenia	
Belarus	Minsk	Embassy		
Bulgaria	Sofia	Embassy	Countries: Montenegro	
Czechia	Prague	Embassy	Countries: Slovakia	
Germany	Berlin	Embassy	Countries: Luxembourg	
Italy	Rome	Embassy	Countries: Malta	
Poland	Warsaw	Embassy		
Romania	Bucharest	Embassy	Countries: Bosnia and Herzegovina; Croatia; Serbia	
Russia	Moscow	Embassy		
Russia	Vladivostok	Consulate-General		
Russia	Khabarovsk	Consular Office		
Sweden	Stockholm	Embassy	Countries: Finland; Iceland; Latvia; Lithuania; Norway	
Switzerland	Bern	Embassy	Countries: Netherlands	
United Kingdom	London	Embassy	Countries: Ireland	

=== Multilateral organizations ===
Organization	Host city	Host country	Mission	Ref.
United Nations	New York City	United States	Permanent Mission	
United Nations	Geneva	Switzerland	Permanent Mission	
UNESCO	Paris	France	Permanent Mission	

== Gallery ==
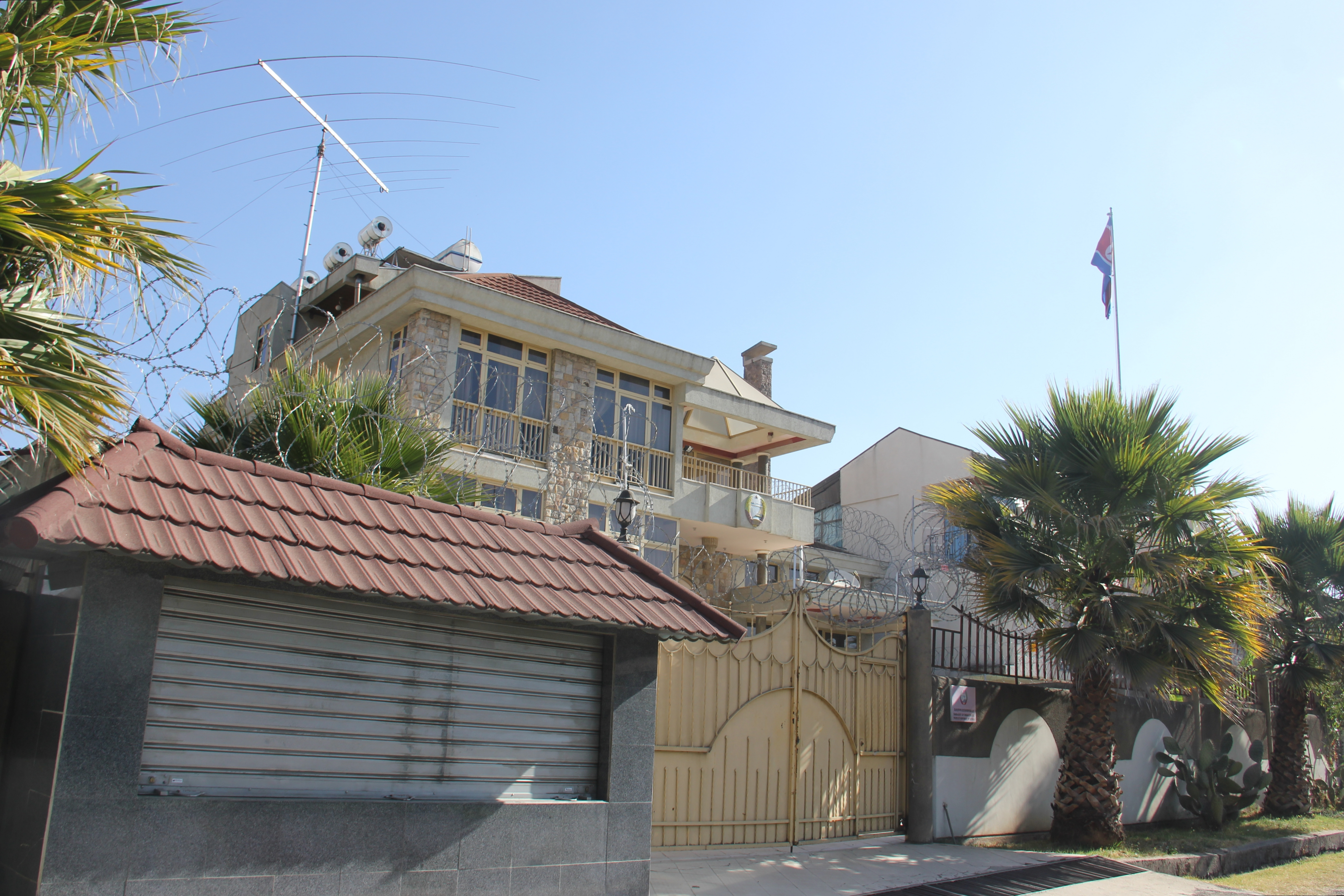
Embassy in Addis Ababa

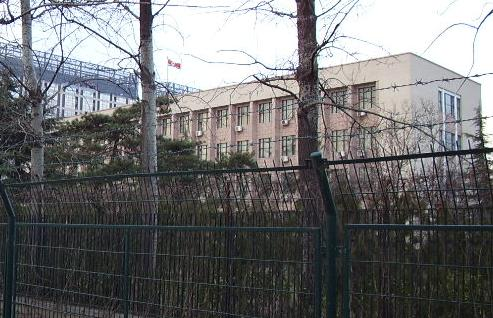
Embassy in Beijing

Embassy in Bucharest

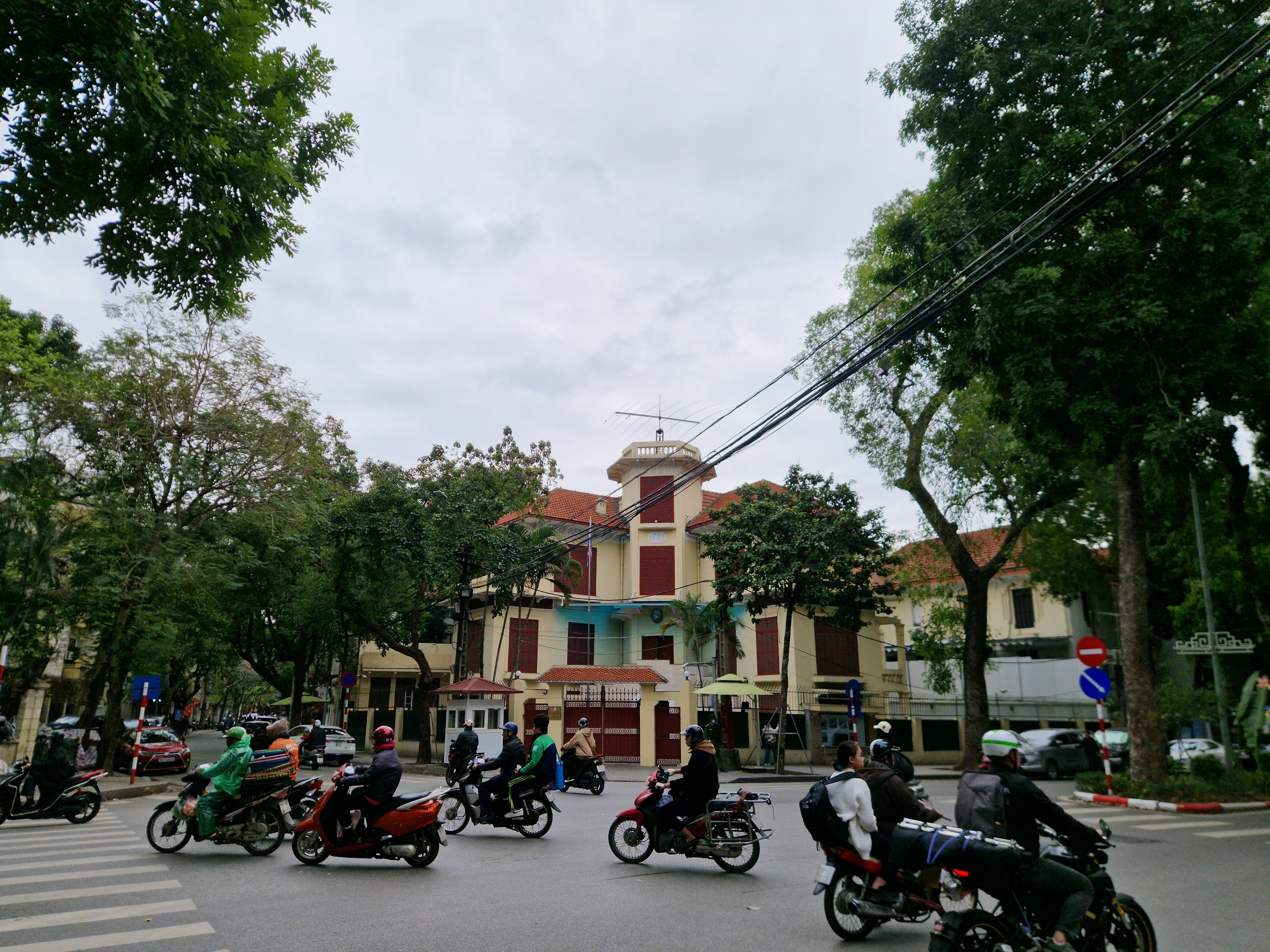
Embassy in Hanoi

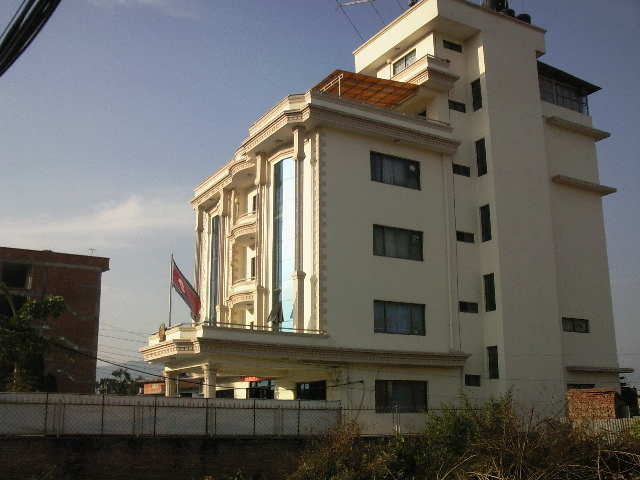
Embassy in Kathmandu

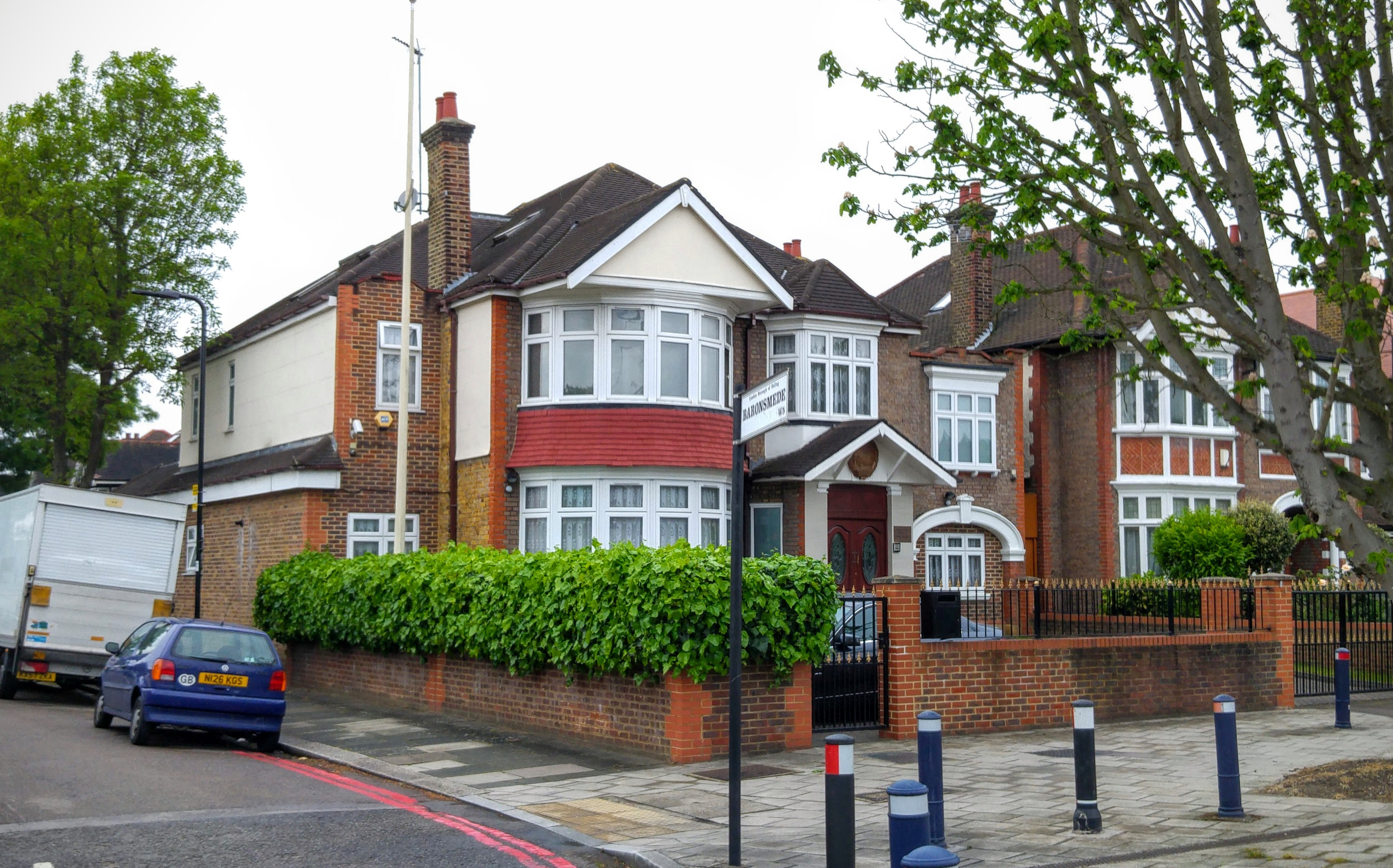
Embassy in London

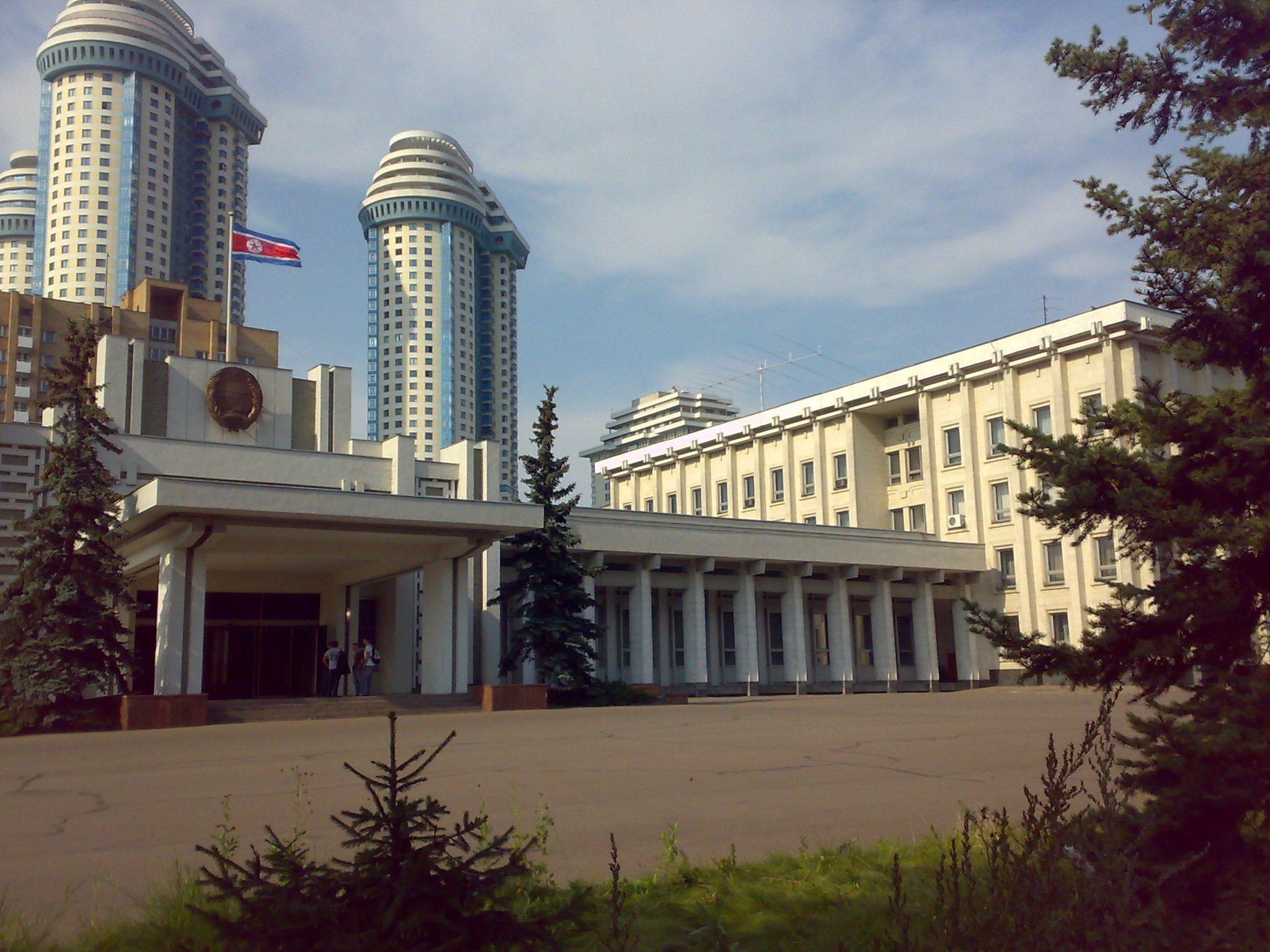
Embassy in Moscow

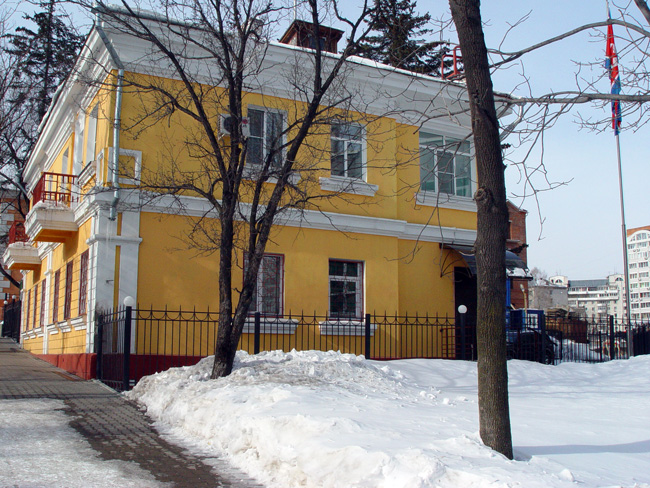
Consular office in Khabarovsk

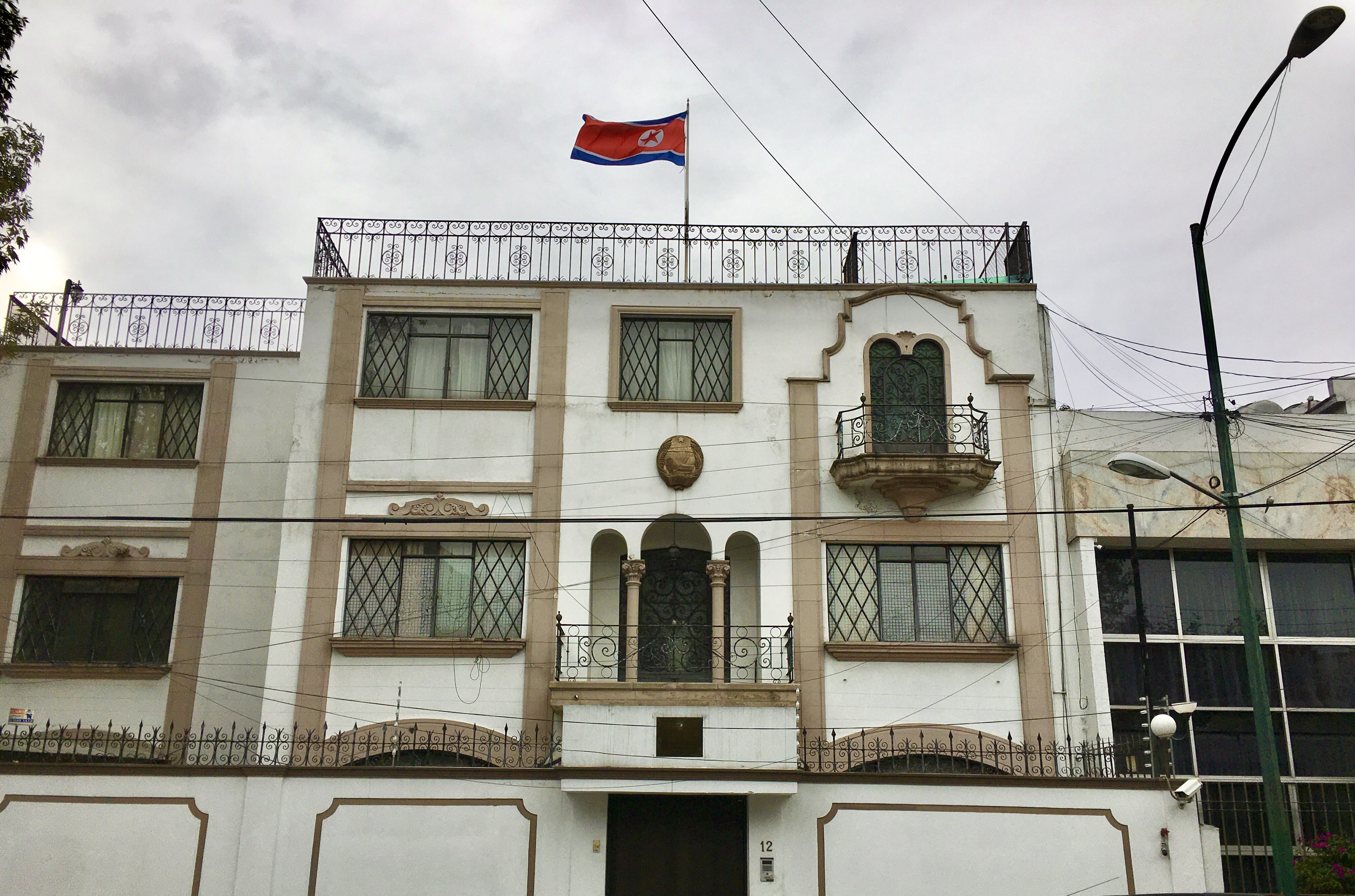
Embassy in Mexico City

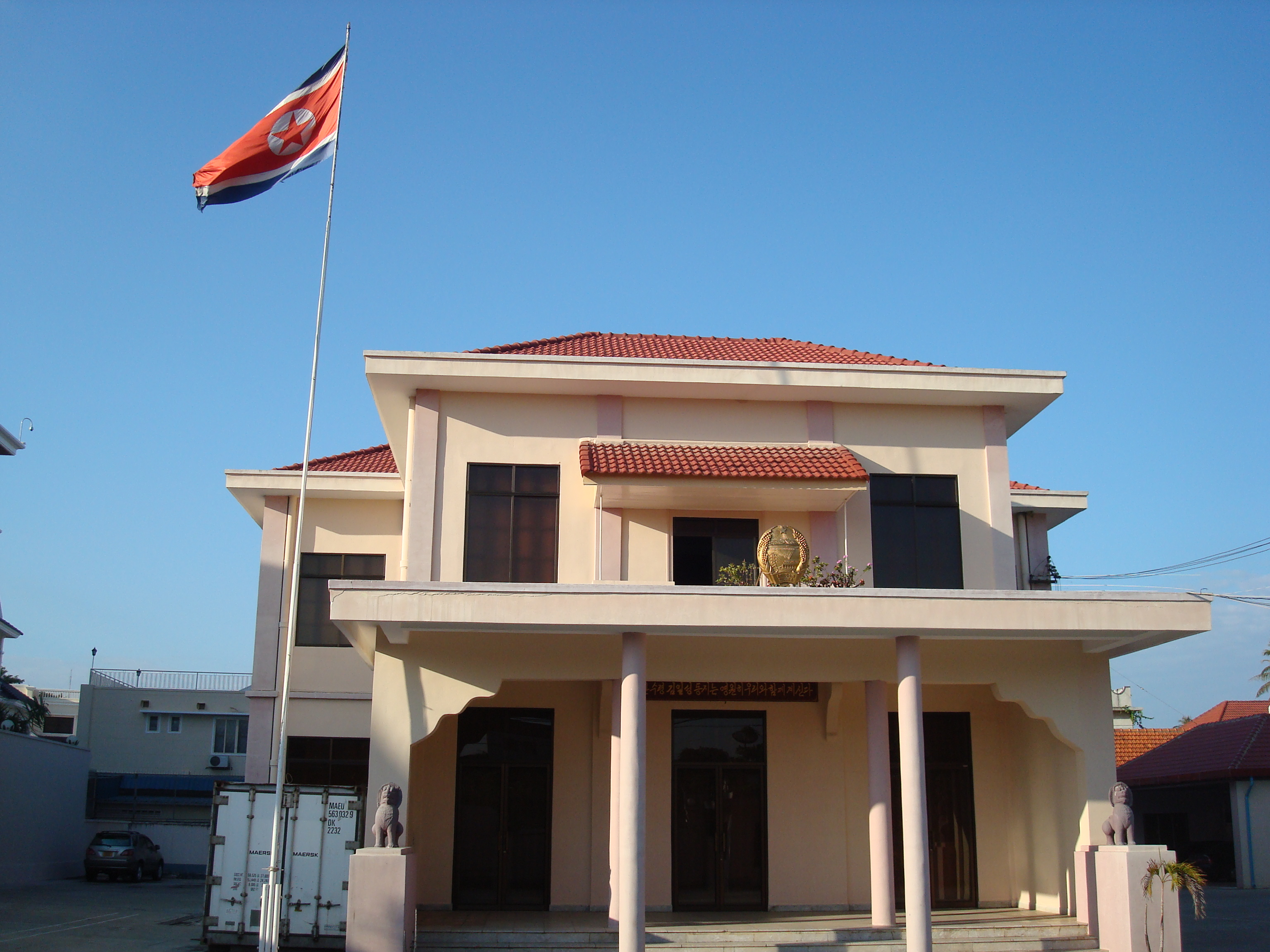
Embassy in Phnom Penh

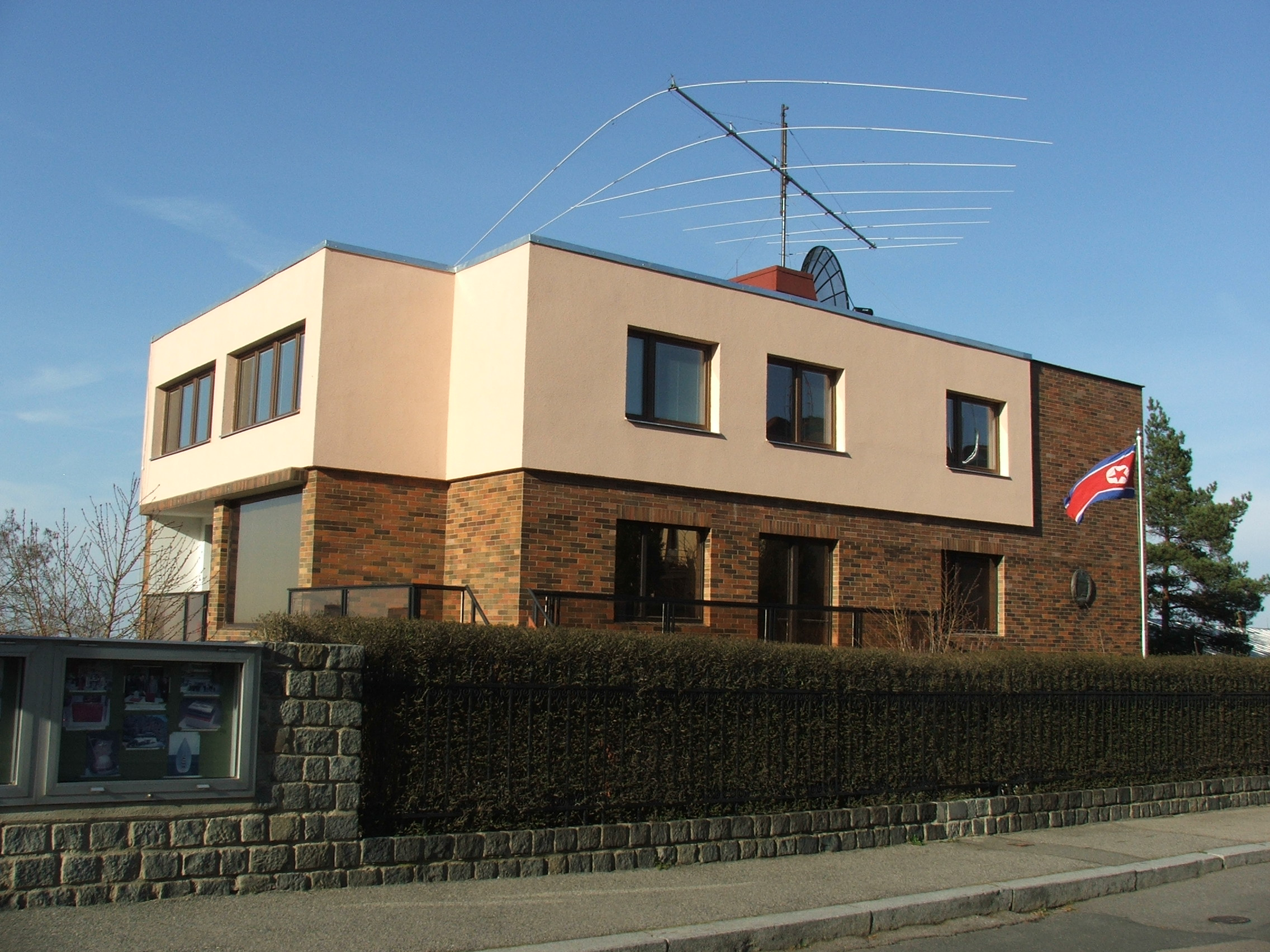
Embassy in Prague

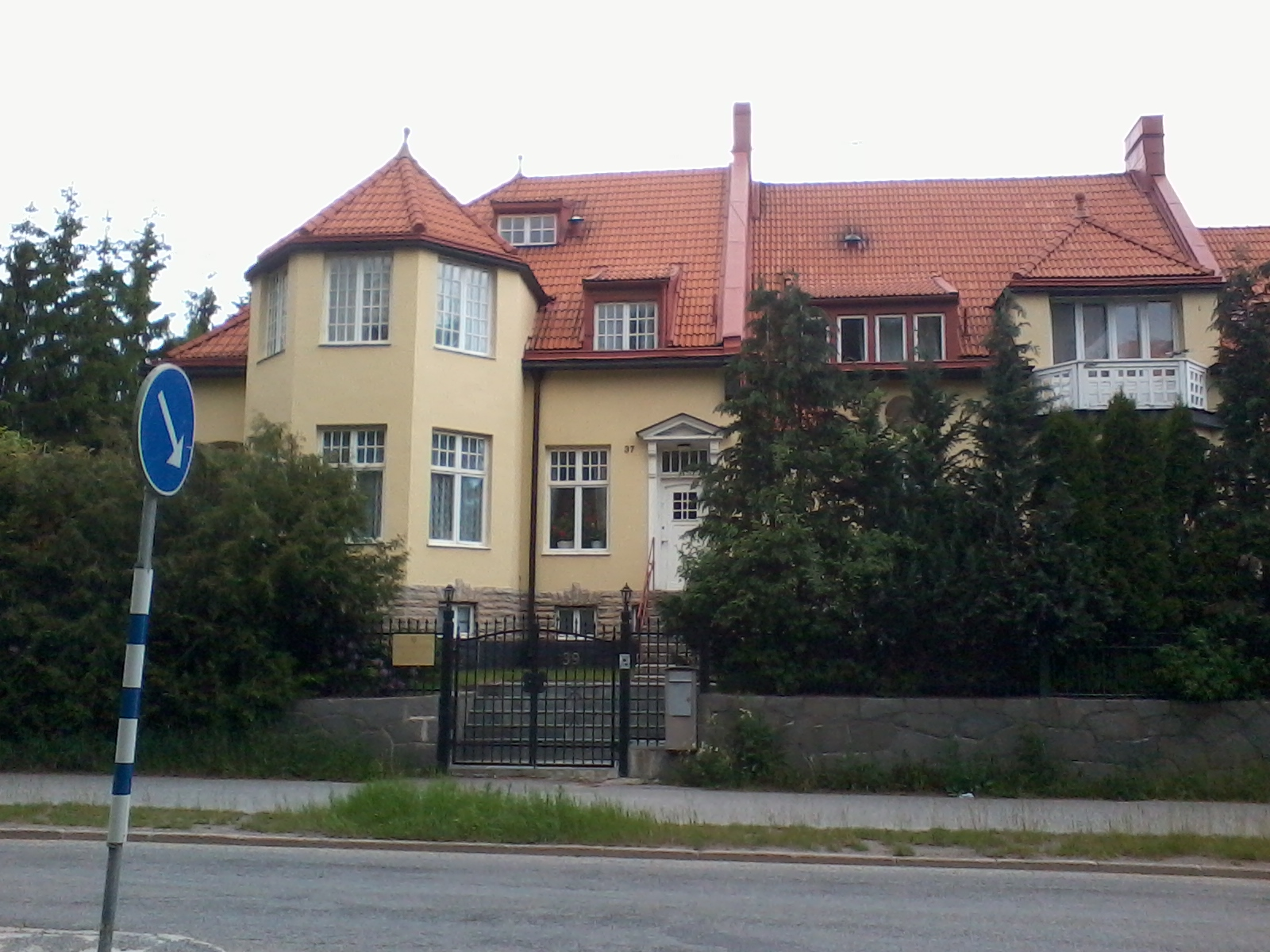
Embassy in Stockholm

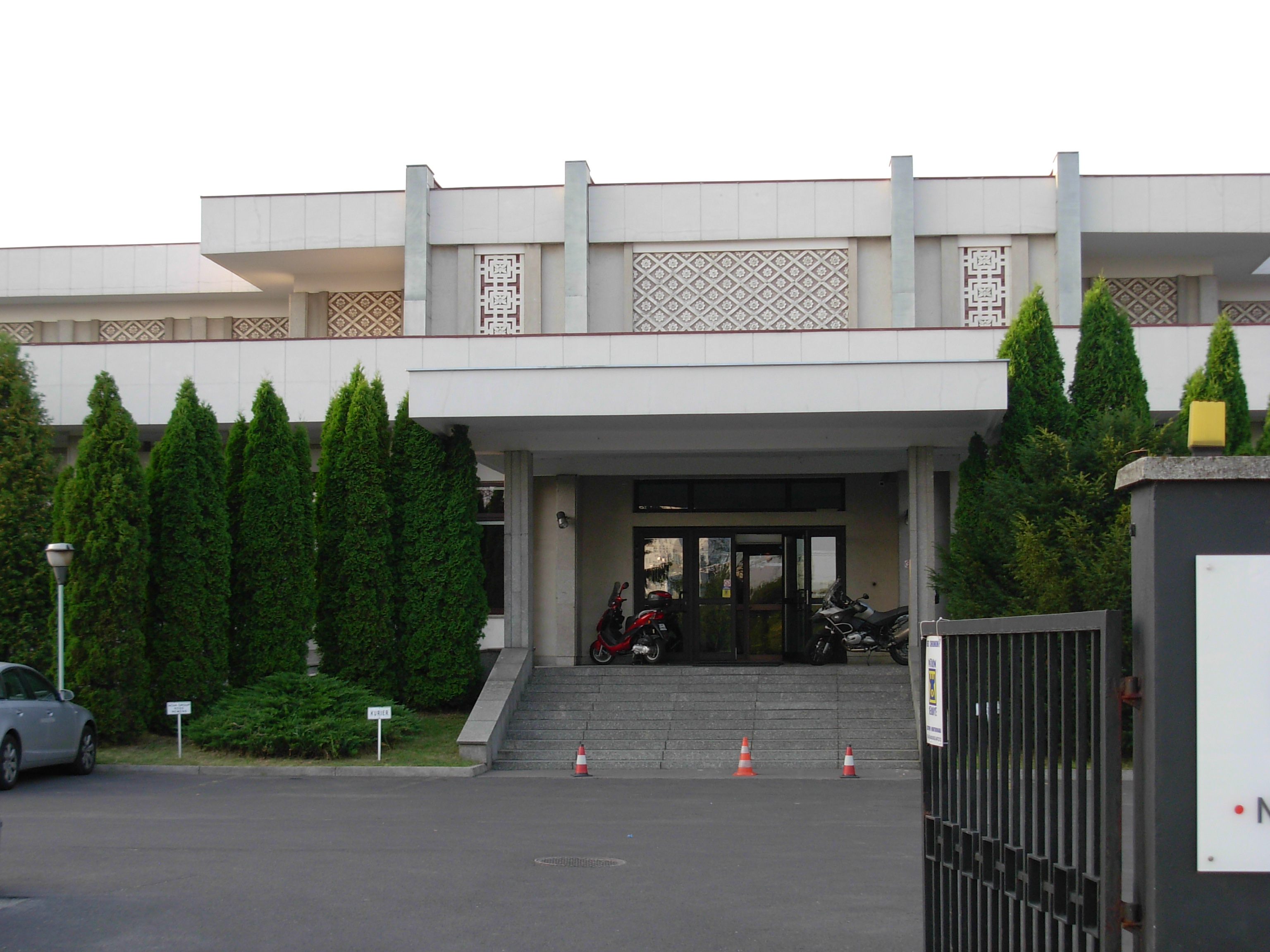
Embassy in Warsaw

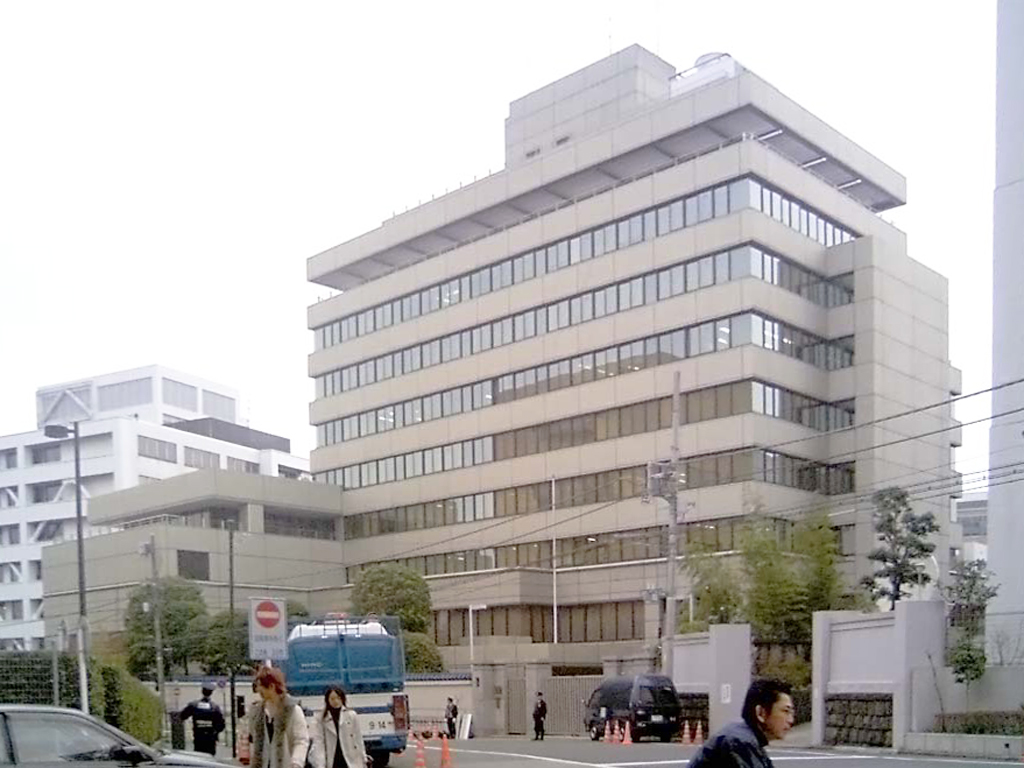
General Association of Korean Residents in Japan in Tokyo

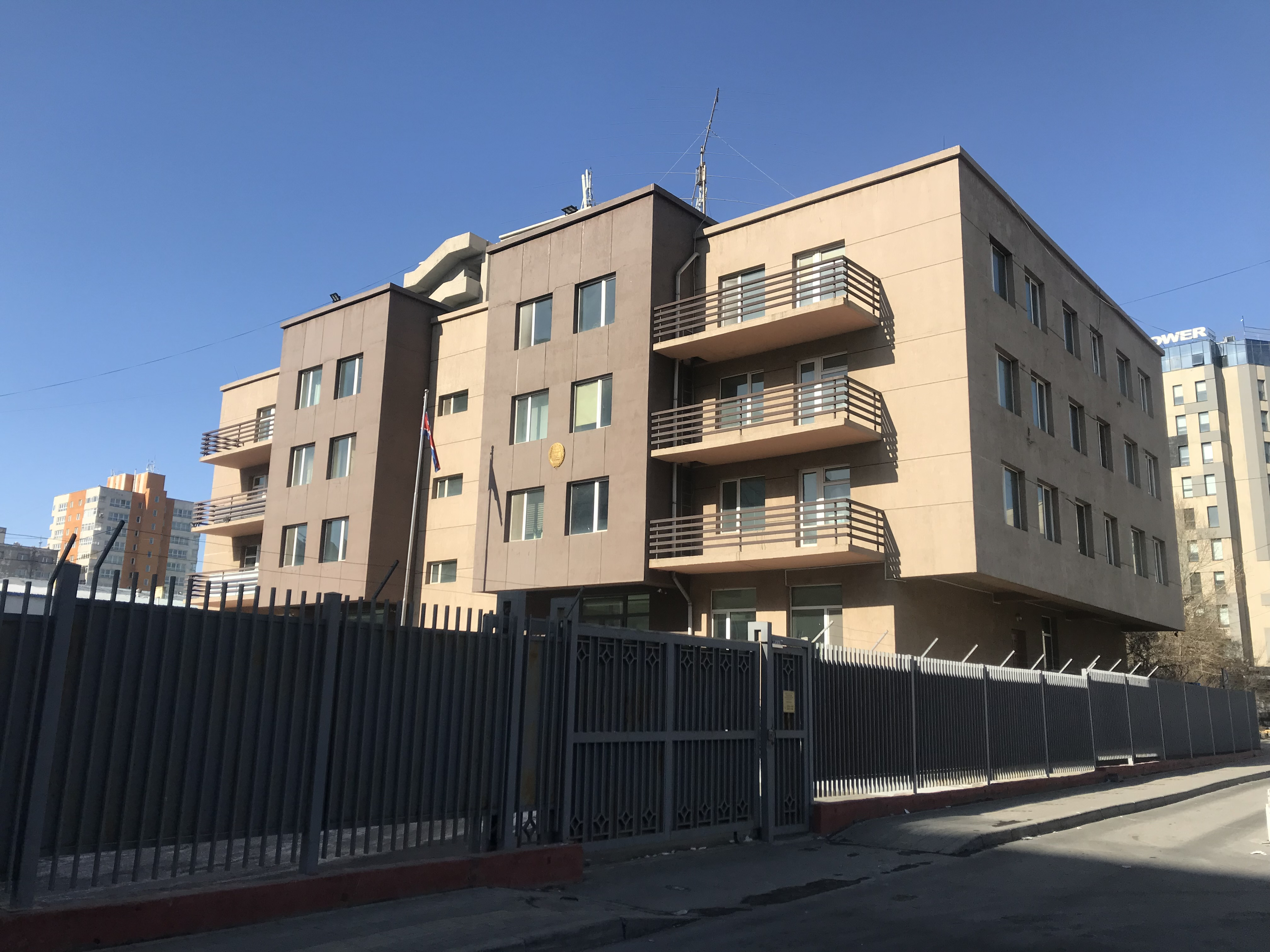
Embassy in Ulaanbaatar

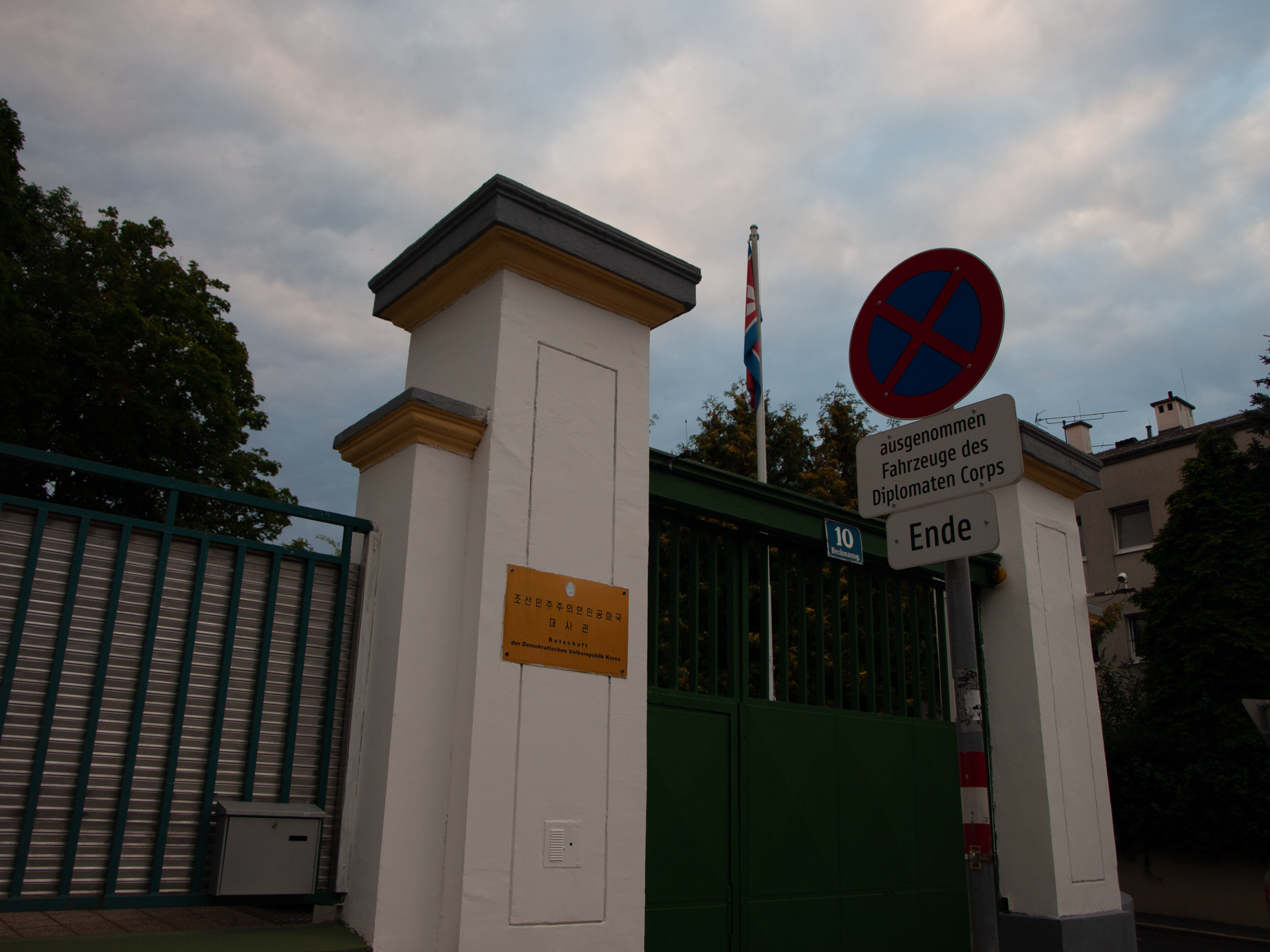
Embassy in Vienna

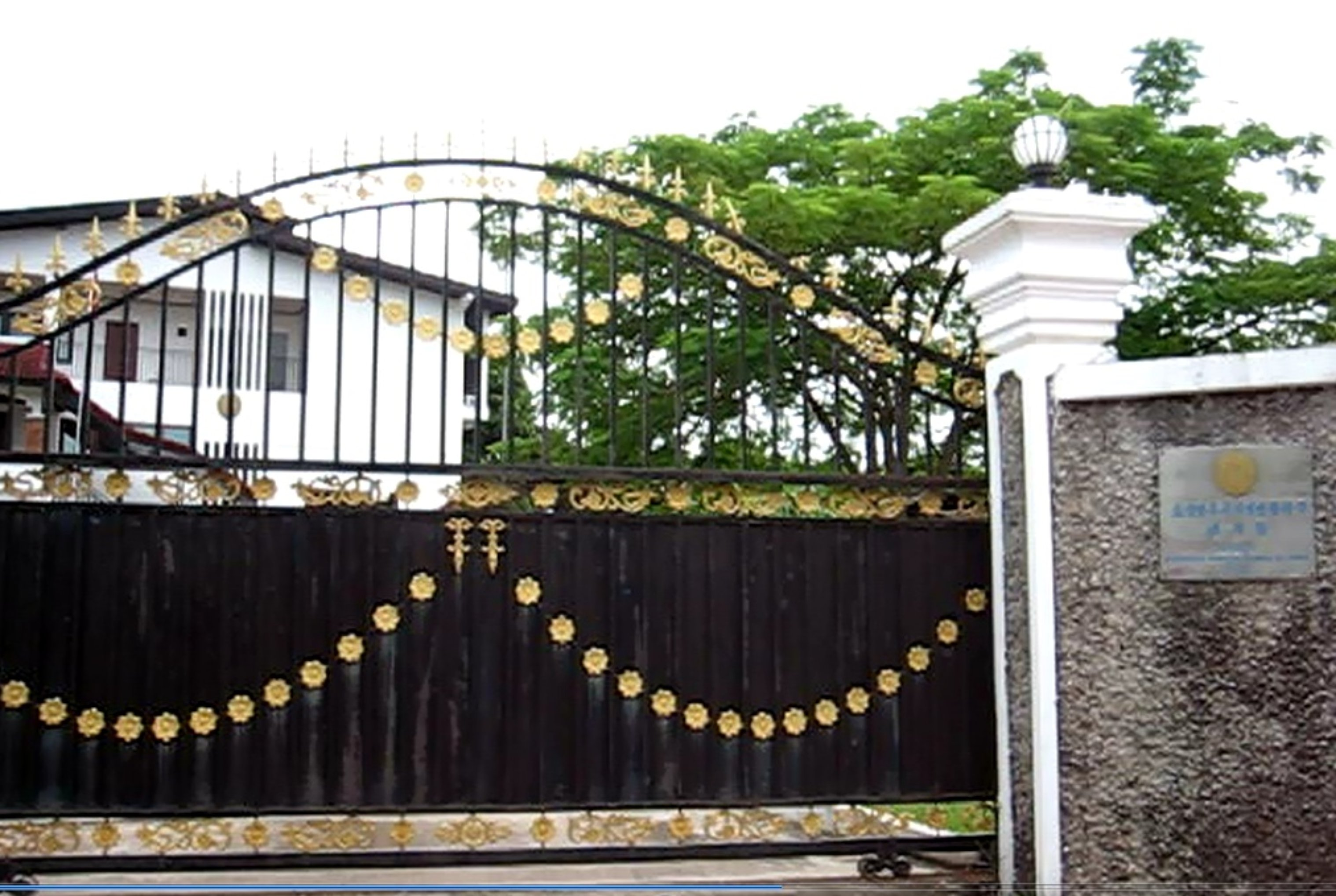
Embassy in Vientiane

== Closed missions ==
=== Africa ===
Host country	Host city	Mission level	Year closed	Ref.
Angola	Luanda	Embassy	2023	
Benin	Cotonou	Embassy	1993	
Cameroon	Yaoundé	Embassy	1995	
Central African Republic	Bangui	Embassy	1991	
Congo-Kinshasa	Kinshasa	Embassy	2023	
Gabon	Libreville	Embassy		
Ghana	Accra	Embassy	1998	
Guinea	Conakry	Embassy	2023	
Guinea-Bissau	Bissau	Embassy	1991	
Libya	Tripoli	Embassy	2024	
Madagascar	Antananarivo	Embassy	2002	
Mali	Bamako	Embassy	1998	
Mozambique	Maputo	Embassy	1995	
Namibia	Windhoek	Embassy	1994	
Senegal	Dakar	Embassy	2023	
Togo	Lomé	Embassy (Note: Resident in Abuja, Nigeria)	1998	
Tunisia	Tunis	Embassy	1995	
Uganda	Kampala	Embassy	2023	
Zambia	Lusaka	Embassy	1995	
Zimbabwe	Harare	Embassy	1998	

=== Americas ===
Host country	Host city	Mission level	Year closed	Ref.
Argentina	Buenos Aires	Embassy	1977	
Chile	Santiago de Chile	Embassy	1973	
Jamaica	Kingston	Embassy	1993	
Nicaragua	Managua	Embassy	1995	
Peru	Lima	Embassy	2017	

=== Asia ===
Host country	Host city	Mission level	Year closed	Ref.
Bangladesh	Dhaka	Embassy	2023	
China	Hong Kong	Consulate General	2023	
Jordan	Amman	Embassy	1998	
Kazakhstan	Astana	Embassy	1998	
Malaysia	Kuala Lumpur	Embassy	2021	
Nepal	Kathmandu	Embassy	2023	
Syria	Damascus	Embassy	2024	
Uzbekistan	Tashkent	Embassy	2016	

=== Europe ===
Host country	Host city	Mission level	Year closed	Ref.
Denmark	Copenhagen	Embassy	1998	
Finland	Helsinki	Embassy	1998	
Hungary	Budapest	Embassy	1995	
Norway	Oslo	Embassy	1976	
Portugal	Lisbon	Embassy	1995	
Spain	Madrid	Embassy	2023	
Ukraine	Kyiv	Embassy	1998	

== See also ==
- Foreign relations of North Korea
- List of diplomatic missions in North Korea
- Visa policy of North Korea
