= Denmark–Korea relations =

Denmark–Korea relations may refer to:

- Denmark–North Korea relations
- Denmark–South Korea relations
