= Hashim Aslami =

Afgani agriculturalist

Mohammad Hashim Aslami is an Afghan agriculturist who was instrumental in growing the country's saffron crop from a $100 grant in 1998 to a $25 million export industry in 2019, despite the wars that engulfed his country during that time. The Afghani president has placed a ban on the importation of the spice from Iran due to the quality of the nations export crop initiating a 'soft' war between the two nations.

== Early education ==
He first learned of the value of Saffron in Iran, where he had immigrated to in 1981 after securing a degree in agriculture from Kabul University. He was in Kabul when the Soviets invaded in 1979 and he watched as the communist installed government took his fellow students away in the chaos that ensued. Many of those were disappeared from university classrooms. After moving to Iran he was educating rural villagers in cultivation techniques, spending 10 years there before returning to Herat province.

== Pilot program ==
While the harvesting of the spice is not suitable for all the provinces of Afghanistan, it is a labor-intensive process that lent itself to the abundance of cheap labor in Herat province. In sufficient quantities Saffron can be competitive in price to Afghanistan's other high value crop, the poppies used to harvest Heroin. In 1998 Aslami convinced his then supervisors at a Danish foreign Aid organization (DACAAR) to fund farmers to switch to harvesting the spice crop. Given a $100 grant, he convinced 4 farmers to begin planting the perennial bulbs from which the flower is the product that the stigmatas are gleaned by hand in the early AM. This period, as the Taliban was gaining ground and influence, was where he went from village to village, convincing farmers to take part in his grand vision. Starting with 300sq meters, one of the early farms is currently cultivating 35 acres of the spice derived from the flower of Crocus sativus, commonly known as the "saffron crocus". Mostly it is grown in small plots of land and Herat remains the largest producer of the crop in Afghanistan. Saffron is a key seasoning, fragrance, dye, and medicine in use for over three millennia. One of the world's most expensive spices by weight, saffron sells for as much as $700 per pound and is referred to as "Red Gold".

== Advisor to Afghanistan ==
With the export value of the spice topping $25million annually, the former aid worker has been of value to the government, saffron production in Afghanistan ranks number 3 worldwide, behind Iran and India. This is growing at 20% annually. As the top government advisor on the market in spice, he is at 63, the mild mannered visionary that is responsible for a rare success in agriculture in Afghanistan. He is currently Senior Advisor of the Ministry of Agriculture, Irrigation and Livestock in Afghanistan.
