= Danish Assistance to Afghan Rehabilitation and Technical Training =

The Danish Assistance to Afghan Rehabilitation and Technical Training (DAARTT) was established in 2003 as a non-political, non-profit humanitarian organization, registered and approved by Government of Afghanistan on 14 January 2004.

The main objective of DAARTT is to support the need for reconstruction and development in Afghanistan, with special focus on the educational sector. The Afghan Ministry of Education works closely together with DAARTT for projects on school construction and rehabilitation. In addition, more focus is also required to improve resources such as teacher capacity building programmes and constructing teacher resource centres in schools.

DAARTT's programme activities also target to secure equal access to schooling for children of both genders, to get the local community involved in the building activities and the subsequent maintenance, and to arouse interest among the local community so they will be actively involved and interested in improving the education condition at home.

Up till now, DAARTT has constructed dormitories and schools in different provinces of Afghanistan, such as Kapisa, Nangarhar, Khogyani and Samangan.

== Projects ==
=== Construction of Girls Dormitories in Kapisa ===
Albironi University is a newly established university in Kapisa province and the university campus is temporary a building of a textile company. Some faculty and administration buildings are currently under construction. However, there is a lack of dormitory for the students. So under the request of the Ministry of Higher Education, DAARTT used private donations to build a two storey dormitory with 80 single beds and the latest facilities. The actual construction of the project began on 1 July 2008.

=== Reconstruction of Malik Yaar Hotak High School ===
Malik Yaar Hotak High School underwent reconstruction and expansion of its compound with helps from DACAAR, DANIDA and DAARTT. The current nine classrooms were reconstructed by DACAAR with the use of DANIDA fund in 1999. In 2008, DAARTT decided to build ten additional classrooms including a 520m boundary wall with the help of private donations.

=== Construction of Karta e Solha Girls High School ===
DAARTT, under the requests of the local community, decided to construct a two-storeyed school with 12 classrooms using private funds from donors. Currently, there are 1200 students enrolled in the school, and 22 female teachers are handling 23 classes with students from 1st Grade to 9th Grade. While waiting for the new building to be constructed, students used the building of an old health clinic as a temporary site. The actual construction work began on 22 July 2008.

=== Training of DAARTT staff in HQ in Denmark ===
To further improve and allow understanding of how things work in the headquarters, trainings were provided to the staff of DAARTT. In August 2009, DAARTT Finance Section Head Ahmad Fahim Nasir had a successful trip to the HQ in Denmark for 13 days, with long meetings and discussions with the DPA board staff.
