= Jon In-chan =

North Korean diplomat

- Hangul: 전인찬
- RR: Jeon Inchan
- MR: Chŏn Inch'an

Jon In-chan (Korean pronunciation: [tsʌ.nin.tsʰan] or [tsʌn] [in.tsʰan]) is the current ambassador of North Korea to countries in Scandinavia.

In 1992, Jon relayed communications regarding North Korea's participation in IAEA safeguards nuclear inspection programs.

He presented his letter of credence to the President of Finland in September 2003, to the King of Norway in October 2003, and to the King of Denmark in September 2004.

== See also ==
- Foreign relations of North Korea
- Denmark–North Korea relations
- Iceland–North Korea relations
- North Korea–Norway relations
- North Korea–Sweden relations
- List of diplomatic missions of North Korea
