= Denmark–North Korea relations =

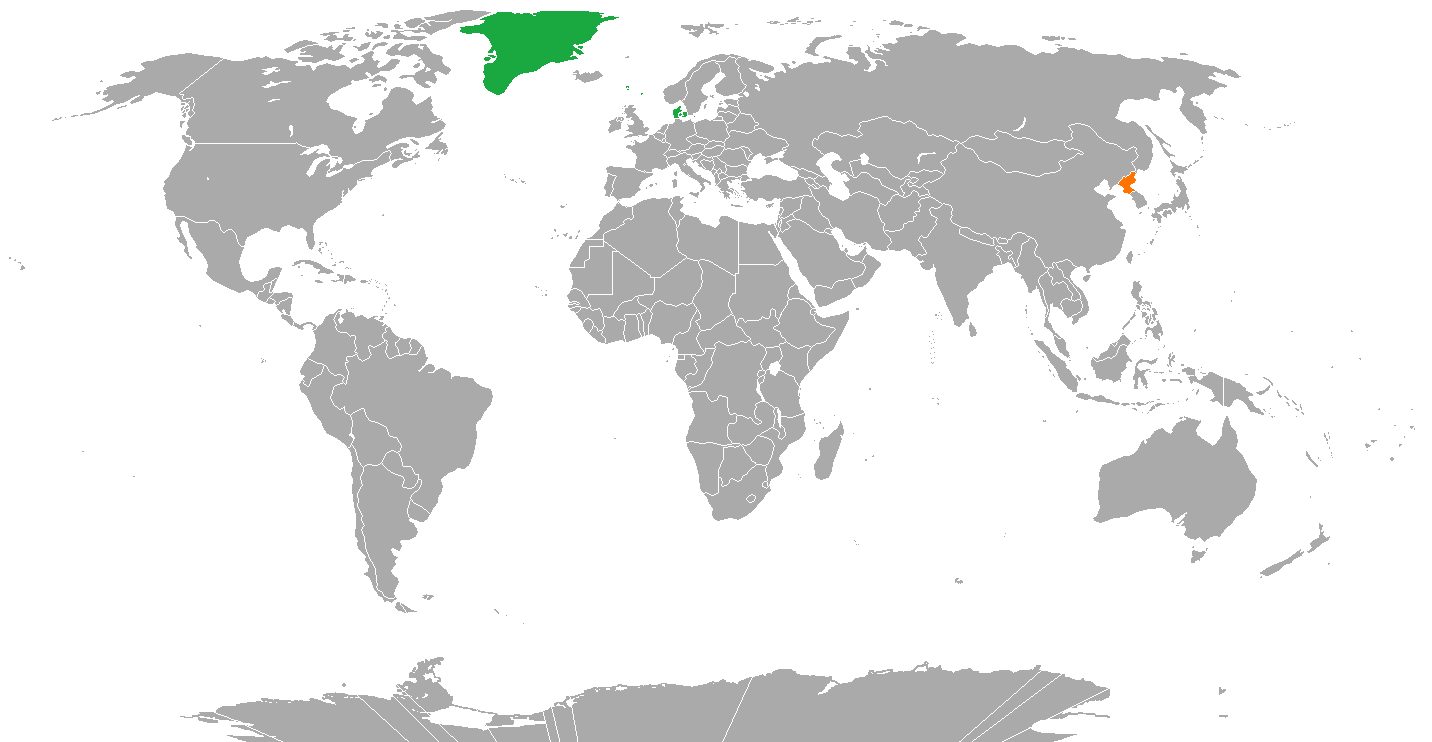

- Denmark: North Korea

Denmark–North Korea relations (Korean: 단마르크-조선민주주의인민공화국 관계) refers to the current and historical relations between Denmark and Democratic People's Republic of Korea (DPRK), commonly known as North Korea. Denmark is represented in the DPRK, through its embassy in Beijing, China. The DPRK is represented in Denmark, through its embassy in Stockholm, Sweden. Denmark supports the efforts to get North Korea back to the six-party talks. In October 2020, a documentary by Mads Brügger about Ulrich Larsen - The Mole, a Danish chef who infiltrated North Korea for 10 years in the documentary The Mole: Undercover in North Korea.

== History and hostile relations ==
Denmark was one of the first countries to recognize the DPRK during the Korean War. Diplomatic relations between Denmark and DPRK were established on 17 July 1973. In October 1976, Denmark closed the DPRK mission to Denmark, and declared the mission as persona non grata, after charges of black market import, sale of drugs, alcohol and cigarettes. Later Norway and Finland followed. North Korea closed their embassy in Denmark in 1998, because of their budget reducement.

Denmark supported the United Nations Security Council Resolution 1695 concerning the DPRK's weapons program. Danish MFA Head of Department of Asia Susan Ulbæk stated that Denmark cannot accept a nuclear armed DPRK.

In September 2009, nine North Koreans arrived at the Danish embassy in Hanoi, Vietnam to seek asylum.

After the ROKS Cheonan sinking in March 2010, by a torpedo, Danish Foreign Affairs Minister Lene Espersen condemned the sinking of the Cheonan, stating that it believed DPRK was responsible. The Minister called on the DPRK to comply with its international obligations.

After the Bombardment of Yeonpyeong in November 2010, Danish Prime Minister Lars Løkke Rasmussen condemned the attack, and called it a "military provocation".

The Mole: Undercover in North Korea, a documentary miniseries directed by the Danish filmmaker Mads Brügger, highlighted North Korean incompliance with UN-sanctions. The Danish foreign minister Jeppe Kofod later condemned the DPRK for its involvement in illegal arms trade.

== Development ==
Danish relief and development non-governmental organization Mission East has as the only Danish NGO, direct access to the DPRK. Mission East has delivered 52.5 tons of aid to the North Korean people. DANIDA has two livestock projects in the DPRK which is financed by United Nations Office for Project Services and International Fund for Agricultural Development. Denmark offers North Korea humanitarian aid through multilateral organisations as Red Cross and the World Food Programme. Denmark tries to influence the development of democratization, respect for human rights and liberalization of the North Korean economy. In 2008, Danish aid to North Korea amounted 239 million DKK.

== See also ==
- Foreign relations of Denmark
- Foreign relations of North Korea
- Denmark–South Korea relations
- The Red Chapel
- Jon In Chan – North Korean ambassador to Scandinavia
