= Danish Committee for Aid to Afghan Refugees =

Non-governmental humanitarian organization

Danish Committee for Aid to Afghan Refugees (DACAAR)
- DACAAR has worked side by side with the Afghan people since 1984
- Formation: 1984
- Type: NGO
- Purpose: Humanitarian work
- Location: Kabul, Afghanistan
- Region served: Afghanistan
- Key people: Mr. John Morse (Director)
- Employees: Ca. 1000
- Website: http://www.dacaar.org/

Danish Committee for Aid to Afghan Refugees (DACAAR) (Danish: Den danske komité for hjælp til afghanske flygtninge) is a non-political, non-governmental, non-profit humanitarian and development organization working to improve the lives of the Afghan people since 1984.

DACAAR work in rural areas and aim at improving rural livelihoods through sustainable activities that engage Afghan communities to be agents of their own development process.

DACAAR employ a holistic approach to all rural development activities in order to ensure long-term viability of projects. Approximately 12 million Afghans across Afghanistan's 34 provinces have benefited from DACAARs humanitarian/developmental activities since the group was established in 1984.

== History ==
The Danish Committee for Aid to Afghan Refugees (DACAAR) was formed in 1984 to support the more than 5 million Afghans, who had fled to Pakistan and Iran and the 2 million, who were displaced within Afghanistan during the Soviet invasion. DACAAR was founded by the Danish Refugee Council (DRC), Danish People's Aid (DPA), Danish Association for International Co-operation (MS) and Caritas Denmark.

== Geographical coverage ==
DACAAR currently cover all of the 34 provinces of Afghanistan with their Emergency WASH projects and Supporting Rural Water Supply Program combined. They implement longer term early recovery and developmental projects in 11 provinces of the country. They are having activities in the following cities:

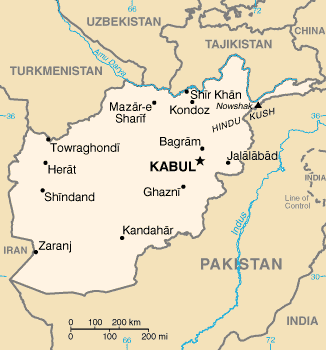

East

Nangarhar, Laghman, Kunur and Noristan.

Central

Kabul, Kapisa, Parwan, Ghazni, Panjsher, Wardak, Bamyan, Khost, Logar, Paktia and Paktika.

North

Balkh, Kunduz, Takhar, Badakhshan, Baghlan, Samangan and Juzjan.

North-west

Faryab, Sar-e-Pol and Daikondi.

West

Heart, Farah, Nimroz, Badghis and Ghor.

South

Kandahar, Helmand, Urozgan and Zabul.

== Sustainable Development Goals ==
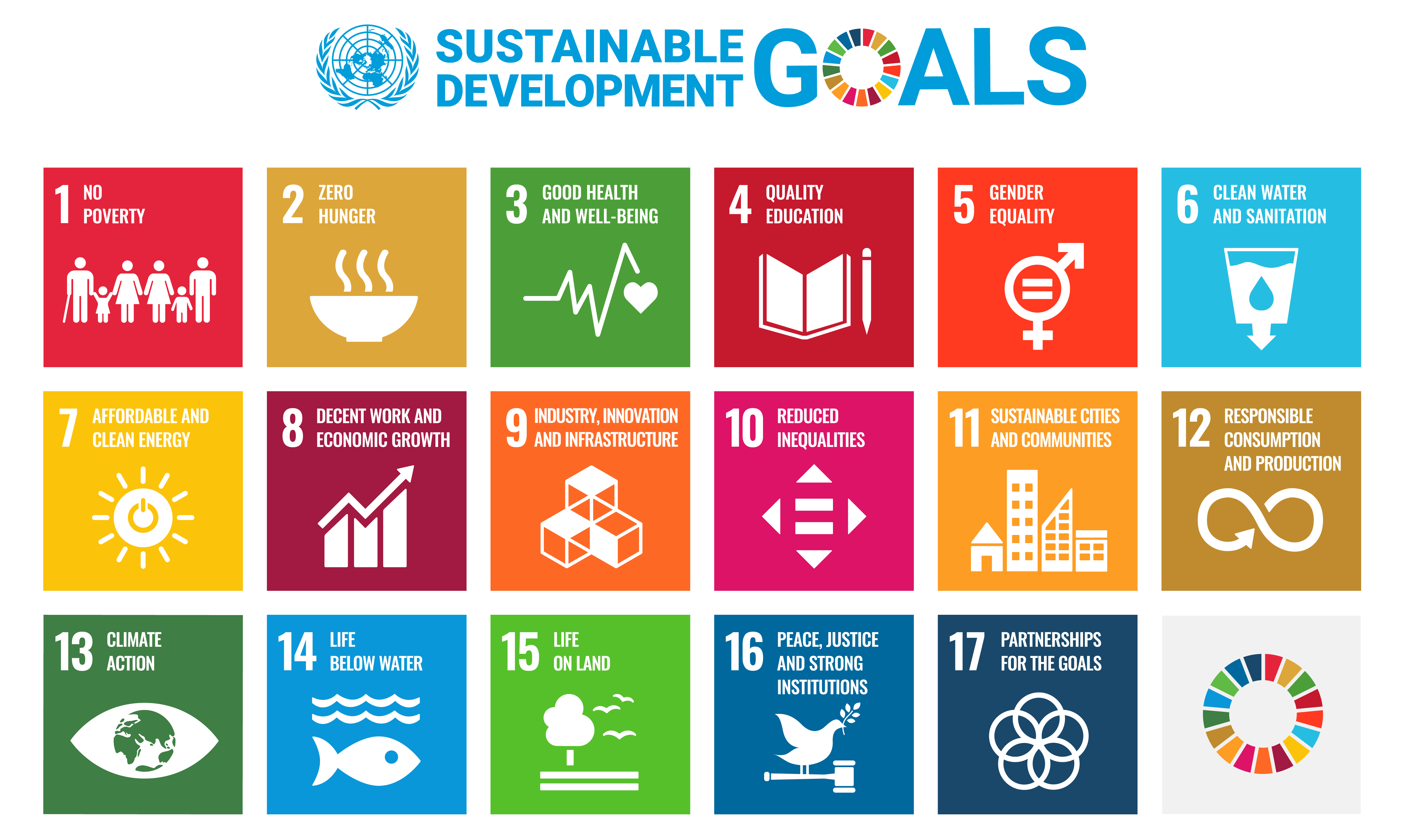

DACAAR is working on a majority of the UN's Sustainable Development Goals (SDG's). Their programmes contributes to the following goals:

(1) No Poverty, (2) Zero Hunger, (3) Good Health and Well-being, (4) Quality Education, (5) Gender Equality, (6) Clean Water and Sanitation, (8) Decent Work and Economic Growth, (10) Reducing Inequality, (11) Sustainable Cities and Communities, (16) Peace, Justice, and Strong Institutions, (17) Partnerships for the Goals.

== Partners ==
DACAAR has worked closely with the Agency Co-ordinating Body for Afghan Relief (ACBAR), the Ministry of Agriculture, Irrigation & Livestock, the Ministry of Rural Rehabilitation & Development and the Ministry of Women Affairs (MoWA).

DACAAR receives funding from a wide range of donors, including Danish International Development Agency (DANIDA), the Royal Norwegian Ministry of Foreign Affairs, DFID and the European Commission among others.

== See also ==
- Danish Refugee Council
- Danish International Development Agency
- Afghan National Solidarity Programme
