= Global Focus =

Platform of Danish international aid charities

- Globalt Fokus
- Founded: 2014
- Merger of: Concord Denmark, NGO FORUM
- Type: Forening (association)
- Registration no.: 35429867
- Purpose: development aid, humanitarian aid, environmental protection
- Location: Copenhagen, Denmark
- Region served: Denmark
- Members: 75
- Employees: 21
- Website: globaltfokus.dk/en

Global Focus (in English) or Globalt Fokus (in Danish) is the umbrella organisation for Danish non-governmental organisations engaged in international development, humanitarian action, and environmental protection.

Global Focus was established in May 2014 through the merger of two predecessor organisations: NGO FORUM and Concord Denmark. The mission of the organisation is to connect its member organisations with relevant politicians, governmental institutions, and the Danish media.

The members of Global Focus are diverse, ranging from large non-profits with offices all around the world to smaller associations which only work in specific sectors or in specific countries. Global Focus supports its member organisations through capacity-building, political advocacy, and public campaigning. As the Danish member in the Brussels-based CONCORD platform, Global Focus also contributes to the collective advocacy at the level of the European Union and participates in other global civil society initiatives.

The organisation maintains a secretariat with approximately 20 staff members in Copenhagen. The governance consists of 15 board members who are elected by the General Assembly.

== Membership ==
As of early 2026, Global Focus had over 75 member organisations, including:

- ADRA Denmark
- ActionAid Denmark
- Aids Fondet
- Amnesty International Denmark
- CARE Denmark
- Caritas Denmark
- Danmission
- Danish Refugee Council (DRC)
- Danish Red Cross
- Danish Church Aid
- International Rehabilitation Council for Torture Victims (IRCT)
- Mission East
- Oxfam Denmark
- Plan Denmark
- Save the Children Denmark
- SOS Children's Villages Denmark
- WaterAid Denmark
- WWF Denmark
