= Danish Red Cross =

Charitable organisation in Denmark

- Dansk Røde Kors
- Formation: April 26, 1876; 150 years ago
- Type: NGO
- Legal status: charity
- Purpose: Humanitarian aid
- Headquarters: Copenhagen
- Official language: Danish
- Affiliations: Global Focus
- Website: Official Website

The Danish Red Cross is a humanitarian aid organization comprising 220 local branches in Denmark, each with its own board.

== History ==
The mother organization of the Danish Red Cross was active in Denmark during the Second Schleswig War in 1864, the first war in which the organization took part.

The current Danish Red Cross dates back to the association's establishment for the care of the sick and wounded under war conditions, established on 26 April 1876. The foundation for the first local branches and the nationwide network of volunteers was laid in 1917. The Red Cross in Denmark today consists of more than 25,000 volunteers.

In addition to the work with the asylum centres, the association's many volunteers also work as visiting friends, Samaritans and give first aid courses. It is also volunteers who ring doorbells during national collections.

=== Red Cross Hospital Ship in the Korean War ===
From March 1951 to August 1953. Danish Red Cross operated Hospital Ship – MS Jutlandia to provided the medical service in South Korea during Korean War.

== Organisation ==
The Danish Red Cross is headquartered at Blegdamsvej 27. Anders Ladekarl succeeded Jørgen Poulsen as Secretary-General in 2008.

== Secretaries-General ==
- 1994–2008: Jørgen Poulsen
- 2008–present: Anders Ladekarl
