= Mission East =

Danish international aid organisation

- Founded: 1991
- Founder: Rene Hartzner, Kim Hartzner
- Purpose: Emergency relief, rehabilitation and development
- Location: Copenhagen, Denmark
- Origins: Christian values
- Region served: Eastern Europe and Asia
- Affiliations: Global Focus
- Revenue: 69,087,945 DKK (2024)
- Expenses: 68,397,091 DKK (2024)
- Website: missioneast.org

Mission East (original Danish name: Mission Øst) is a Danish non-profit organisation dedicated to supporting vulnerable populations in crisis-affected countries. It was founded in 1991 and works across the former Soviet Union, the Middle East, Asia, and Africa to deliver humanitarian aid during disasters and provide long-term development assistance.

The organisation describes itself as "being based on Christian values" and is recognised for its adherence to high humanitarian standards.

== History ==
After smuggling bibles into the former Soviet Republics towards the end of the Eastern Bloc and witnessing the difficult living conditions in the early 1990s, René Hartzner and his son, Dr. Kim Hartzner, founded Mission East in 1991. René Hartzner had previously been working for one of the world's largest grain companies, while Kim Hartzner was practising as a medical doctor.

Initially, the organisation operated out of René Hartzner's garage in his home in Birkerød. Its work started with the request of a church on the outskirts of Saint-Petersburg who expressed a great need for medicine, especially for elderly diabetic patients. René Hartzner raised funds in Denmark for this medicine which were purchased and then sent to Russia. Within a year, the organisation was also working in Poland, Ukraine, Romania, Albania, Armenia and the Philippines. Not only medicine, but also medical equipment food and clothing was shipped to these countries. Overtime, the simple delivery of goods for immediate aid transformed into a longer-term support to allow local communities to build sustainable livelihoods and become more resilient.

In 2002, the missionary work of the organisation was separated and taken into a new organisation named Aktiv Mission, of which René Hartzner was the Secretary-General from its inception until the end of 2019.

Over the years, Mission East's interventions expanded far beyond Eastern Europe to include countries in Central and East Asia, as well as Africa and the Middle East.

In 2013, Kim Hartzner co-founded the organisations German sister agency Mission East Deutschland.

After having been the Secretary-General since 1999, Kim Hartzner stepped down in 2020 after controversy about his management style and questions about his ability to continue leading the organisation that had grown substantially over the years. He was replaced in January 2021 by Betina Gollander-Jensen, who previously served as Head of International Aid in Caritas Denmark and as an advisor at the Danish Ministry of Foreign Affairs Denmark.

== Geographic reach ==
Mission East's headquarters are divided into a main office in Hellerup near Copenhagen, Denmark, and a second headquarter in Brussels, Belgium. The Danish headquarters handles communication, fundraising and administration, while the Brussels headquarters is responsible for the work in the countries as well as finance, HR and IT support.

In addition, Mission East maintains country offices in several countries. As of early 2026, Mission East was working in Afghanistan, Armenia, Iraq, Lebanon, Myanmar, Nepal, Nigeria, North Korea, Syria, Tajikistan, and Ukraine.

== Work ==
Mission East implements programs both directly to the people in need and through local partners (in accordance with the principle of localisation), depending on the context and needs of the communities they are working with.

As the work of the organisation covers both development aid, and specifically rural community development, and emergency relief, the different programmes cover a wide range of sectors. These include WASH (water, sanitation, and hygiene), food security, livelihoods, and disaster risk reduction (DRR).

In its organisational strategy for the years 2022-2030, Mission East identified greening, innovation, community engagement, inclusion, the humanitarian-development-peace-climate nexus, and localisation as "strategic enablers" of its work.

The financial resources required for this work comes from private supporters, foundations, churches, as well as institutional donors, including the European Union, the United Nations and different European governments.

== Affiliations ==
Mission East is affiliated to a number of sectoral network organisations, including the Brussels-based networks EU-CORD, CONCORD, and VOICE, as well as the CHS Alliance, the Danish international NGO platform Globalt Fokus, and the Danish association for fundraising organisations Indsamlingsorganisationernes brancheorganisation (ISOBRO). Mission East also signed the Charter for Change.

Mission East has been certified as compliant with the Core Humanitarian Standard (CHS) since 2017 and is a member of the CHS Alliance. It is also a signatory to the Code of Conduct for the International Red Cross and Red Crescent Movement and NGOs in Disaster Relief and applies Sphere standards in its operations.
