= Denmark–Korea Treaty of 1902 =

1902 treaty between Denmark and Korea

The Denmark–Korea Treaty of 1902 was negotiated between representatives of the Kingdom of Denmark and the Korean Empire.

== Background ==
In 1876, Korea established a trade treaty with Japan after Japanese ships approached Ganghwado and threatened to fire on the Korean capital city. Treaty negotiations with several Western countries were made possible by the completion of this initial Japanese overture.

In 1882, the Americans concluded a treaty and established diplomatic relations, which served as a template for subsequent negotiations with other Western powers.

== Treaty provisions ==
The Danes and Koreans negotiated and approved a multi-article treaty with provisions similar to other Western nations.

Ministers from Denmark to Korea could have been appointed in accordance with this treaty; but diplomatic affairs were handled by the Belgians.

The treaty remained in effect even after the protectorate was established in 1905.

== See also ==
- Unequal treaties
- List of Ambassadors from Denmark to South Korea
