= Denmark–South Korea relations =

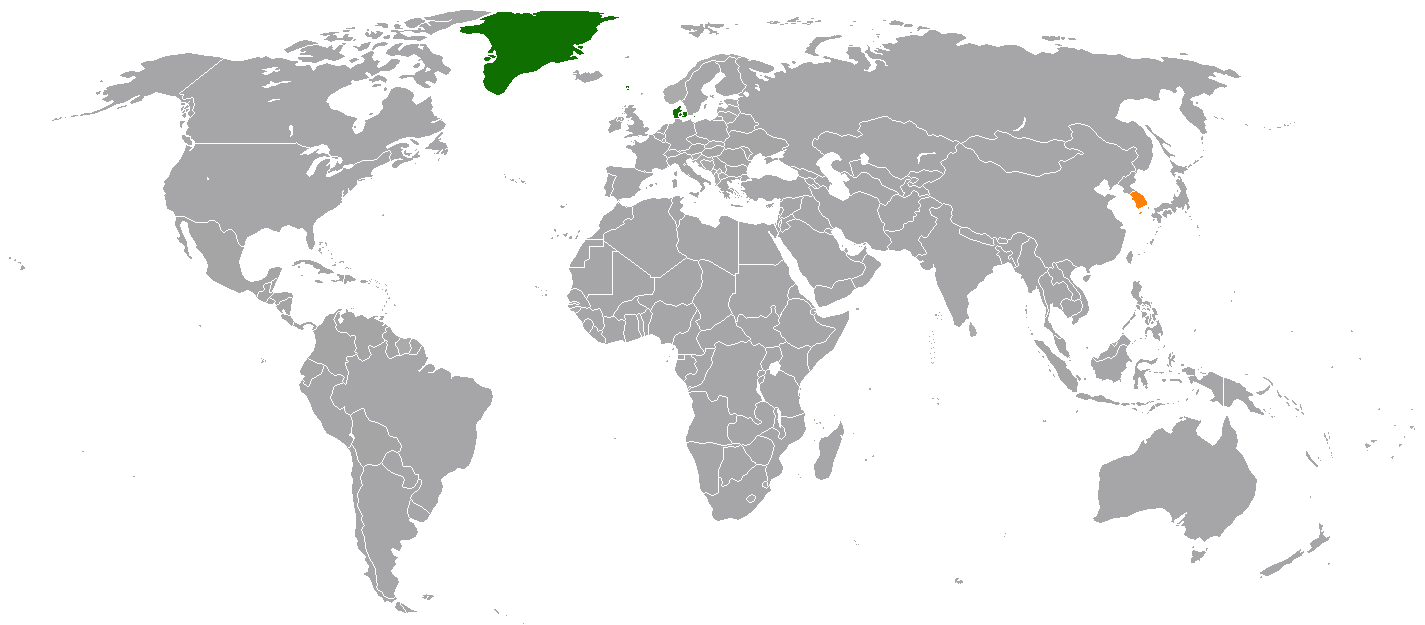
- Denmark: South Korea

Diplomatic mission
- Danish Embassy, Seoul: Korean Embassy, Copenhagen

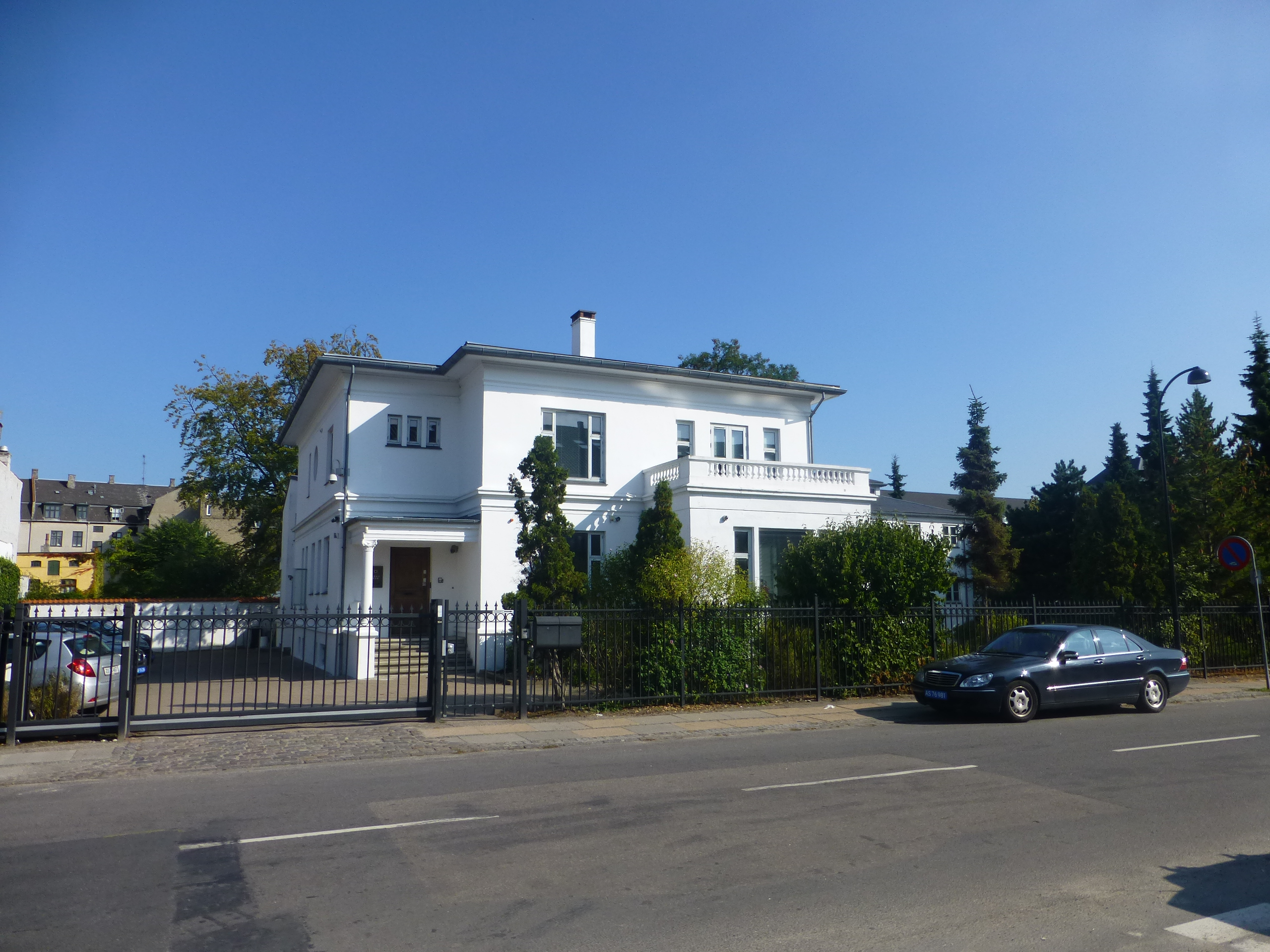
South Korean embassy in Copenhagen, Denmark.

Denmark–South Korea relations are the current and historical relations between Denmark and South Korea. Denmark has an embassy in Seoul. South Korea has an embassy in Copenhagen. Diplomatic relations were established on 11 March 1959.

== History ==
=== Early contacts, and Danish businesses ===
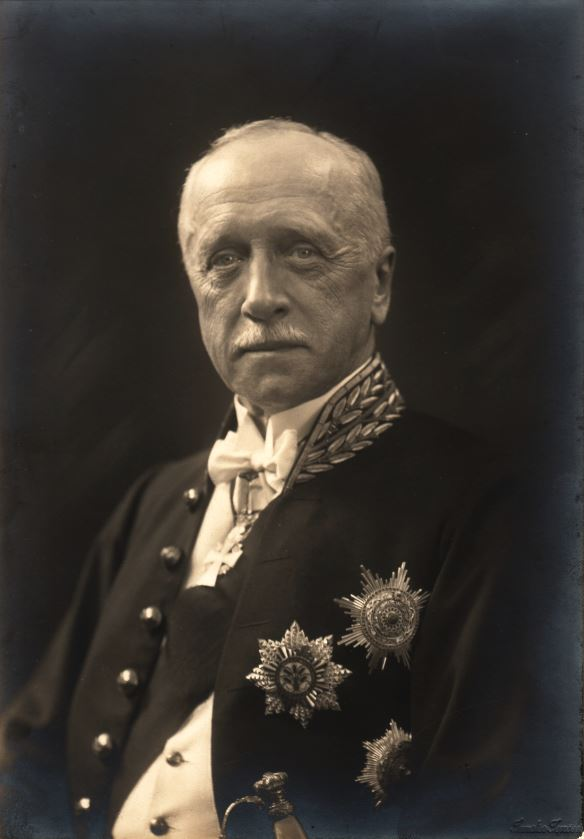
James Frederick Oiesen, who worked as customs commissioner in Korea in the late 19th century.

The earliest record of Korean-Danish contact happened in 1889, when the Danish James Frederik Oiesen worked as commissioner of the Korean customs in Seoul for five years. Oiesen also later became the commissioner of the Korean customs in Wonsan, as well as being British consul at Wonsan for six years. This led to the business opportunities of many Danish companies operating in Korea. The first telegraph lines in Korea were the lines from Busan to Nagasaki, lines from Wonsan to Busan, and the lines from Busan to Seoul, connected by the Danish company The Great Northern Telegraph Company owned by Carl Frederik Tietgen. Another Danish company was the East Asiatic Company, which requested the Korean government to engage in several trade treaties.

=== Denmark-Korea Treaty of 1902 ===
The Denmark-Korea Treaty of 1902 was negotiated between representatives of Denmark and the Empire of Korea. In 1876, Korea established a trade treaty with Japan after Japanese ships approached Ganghwado and threatened to fire on the Korean capital city. Treaty negotiations with several Western countries were made possible by the completion of this initial Japanese overture. In 1882, the Americans concluded a treaty and established diplomatic relations, which served as a template for subsequent negotiations with other Western powers.

=== Korean War ===
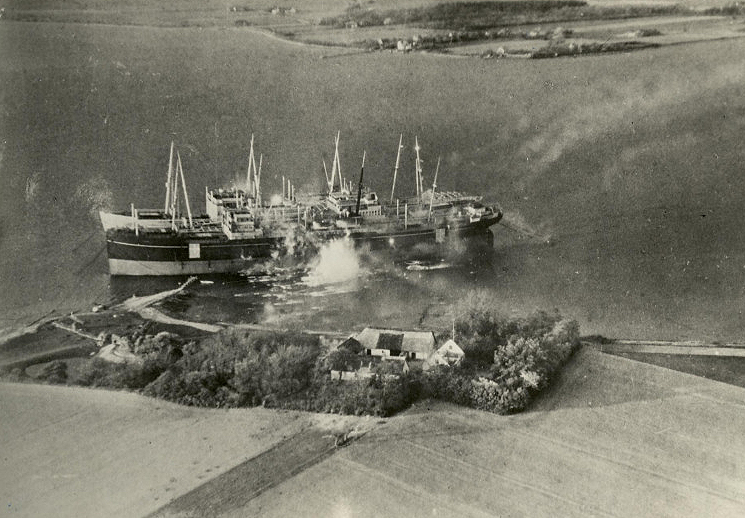
The air raid of 3.May 1945. Java is in front, Falstria in the middle, and Jutlandia at the rear.

When North Korean communist forces attacked South Korea on June 25, 1950, Denmark agreed to provide assistance to the UN and to give humanitarian support to the allied forces in South Korea. The decision was not uncomplicated: the mood between the superpowers were extremely tense, and Denmark had to find a way to support the UN without being aggressive. Almost instantly, medical supplies were made available, and after negotiations Denmark also agreed to send a hospital ship. In the fall of 1950, East Asiatic Company again agreed to place the ship at the disposal of the Danish Government, whilst it was en route to New York City.

On January 23, 1951 she was sent to Korea. She sailed under 3 flags: Dannebrog, the Red Cross, and the UN flag. The day before the departure, she was visited by King Frederik and Queen Ingrid.

Denmark undertook the refitting of MS Jutlandia as a modern hospital ship, and consigned it to Korea. She had four operation theatres, four hospital departments with up to 356 beds, X-ray eye and dental clinics as well as laboratories, dispensary and special departments.

=== Present ===
Denmark and South Korea had a meeting in Seoul on Oct. 13. Korea Foreign Affairs Minister, Kang Kyung-wha and Danish counterpart, Anders Samuelsen emphasized their Partnership and both agreed to cooperate development of political and economical issues. The ministers talked about celebration of diplomatic relations between Korea and Denmark. The events will be organized in 2019. FTA between Korea and the European Union was one of important issues. The ministers criticized "North Korea's nuclear and missile weapons development, and asked that all nations comply with and carry out U.N. Security Council resolutions, reaffirming the need to push for a complete, irreversible and verifiable dismantlement of Pyongyang's nuclear program in a peaceful manner."

== Defense cooperation ==
On May 14, 2012, Korea and Denmark agreed to discuss pending issues of defense cooperation and actively pursue defense cooperation between the two countries. They suggested that the defense industries of Korea and Denmark design their future with a strategy to develop a market while reducing investment costs, because of the small domestic market, they have to pioneer the global market. Korea and Denmark signed a memorandum of understanding on cooperation with the defense industry and military service in May 2011 to establish a cooperative channel for the defense industry. At a briefing session of defense companies, South Korea's Company 'Hunid Technology' and Denmark's company 'Systematic' signed a memorandum of understanding for business cooperation and strengthened cooperation between them. Then a month later, Prince Frederick of Denmark established the defense company F&S. Denmark's defense industry was able to expand with the two countries acquisition of private capital, and South Korea will establish a strategy to send relevant advertisements to Korea with support for the F&S.

== Green Growth Convention ==
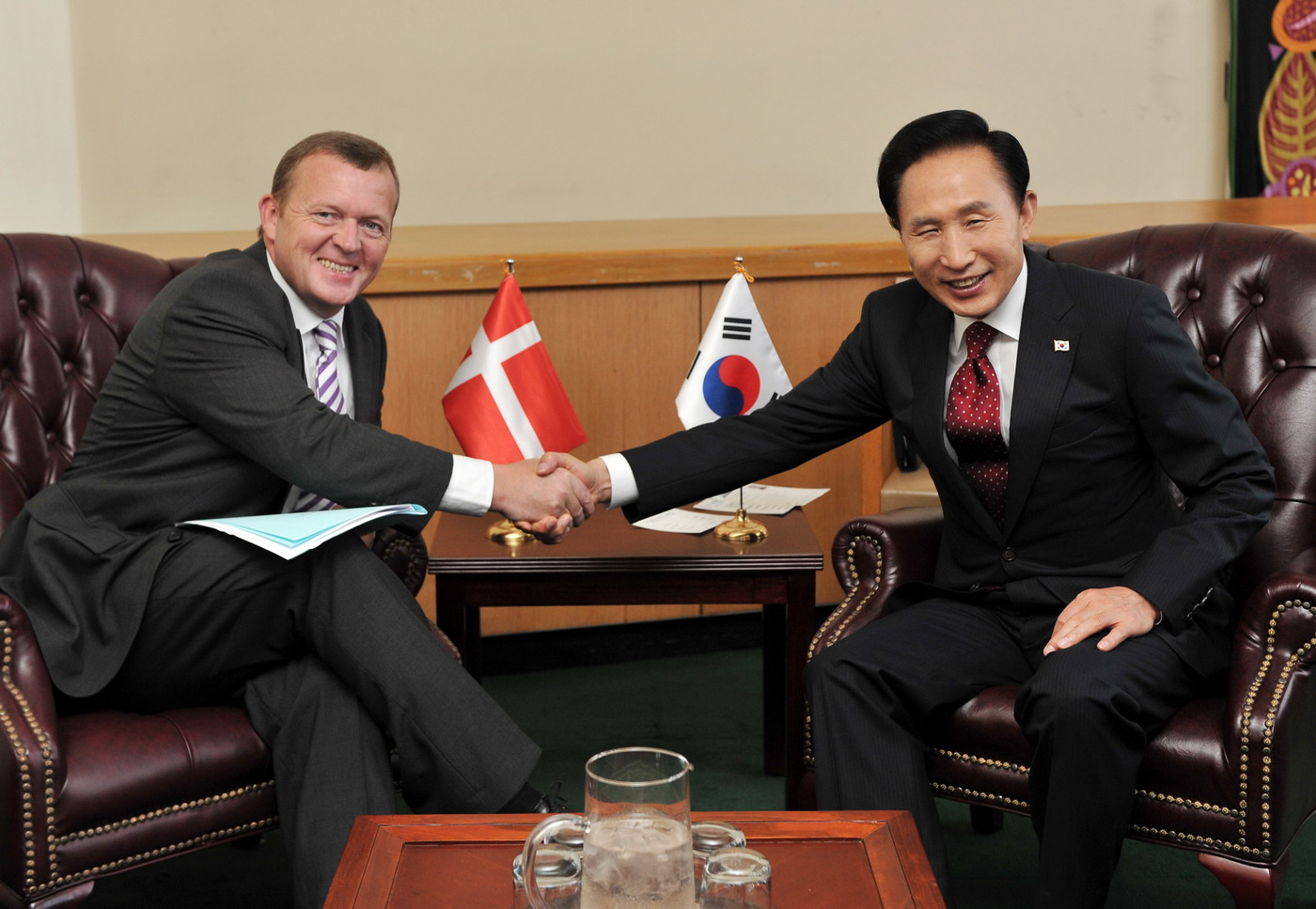
A meeting between Danish and South Korean presidents (2009)

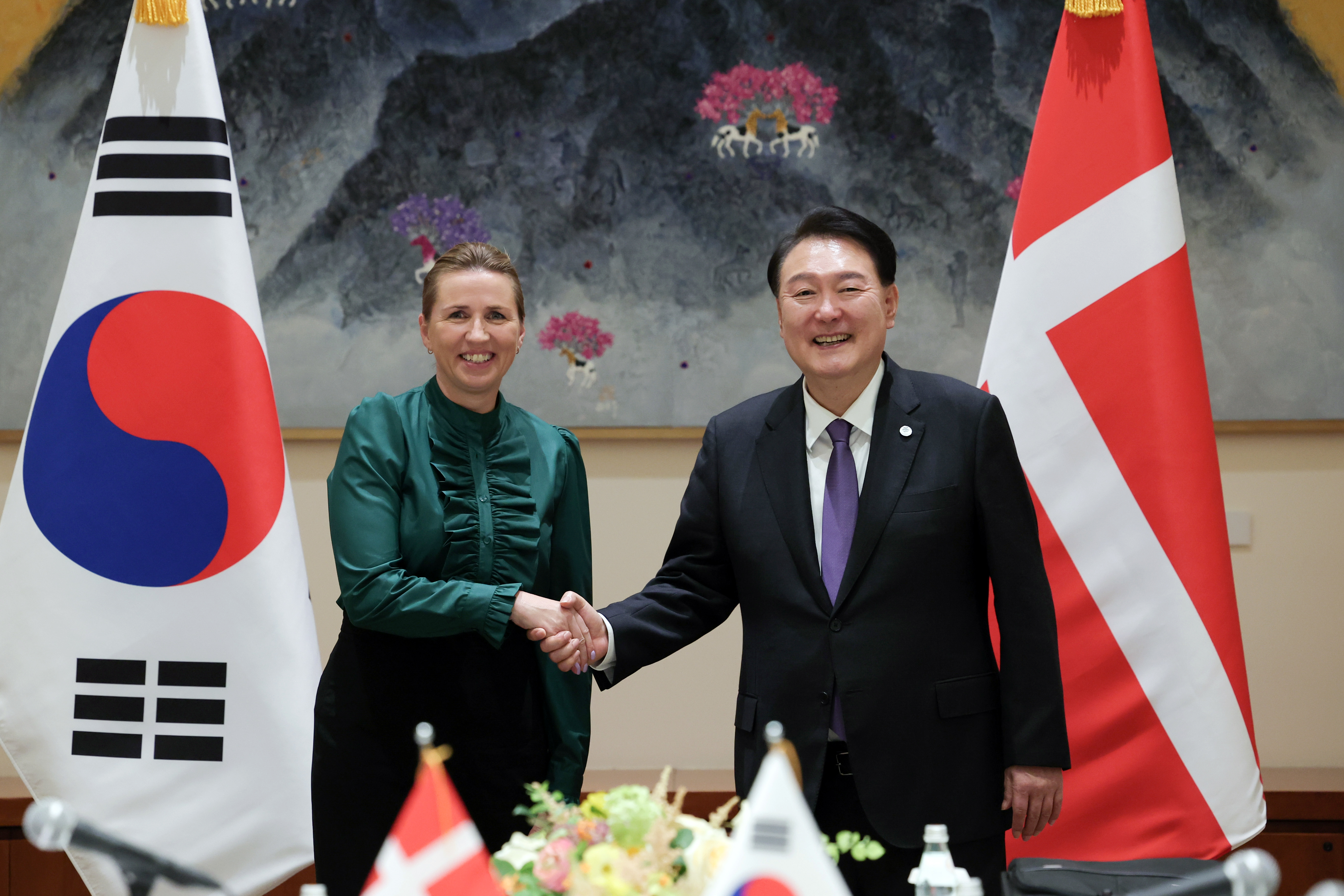
A meeting between Danish and South Korean presidents (2023)

South Korea and the Denmark Government and is 12th in Copenhagen, Denmark, Lee Myung-bak, president and Las Løkke Rasmussen.' At the summit where the two leaders launched the Green Growth convention, some 70 Korean and Danish executives were present. The two leaders agreed to hold a second meeting on the Green Growth convention in the wake of the 2012 Expo, which had held in Korea from May 12 to August 12, 2012. The following is a 'Green Growth convention between the South Korea government and Denmark's government on the establishment of a summary of the joint statement. First, South Korea president Lee Myung-bak and Rasmussen the Danish Prime Minister to cooperate to foster political and economic and technical cooperation for Green Growth convention. South Korea and Denmark have ambitious plans to expand renewable clean energy consumption to make the country a cleaner, more energy-efficient green economy. In particular, the two countries agreed at the United Nations 'Sustainable Development Conference (Rio + 20)' that the agenda for 'Access to Energy for All' should be promoted. And the two leaders welcomed the memorandum of under the guidance of 'Global Green Growth Institute(GGGI)' and understanding signed. It is possible for developing countries to establish and implement national and local state-level strategies, policies, and institutional mechanisms for green growth that include the goals of poverty eradication, employment creation and community development. So, the Denmark government provide 5 million$ per year for the activities of the GGGI over the next three years in accordance with the MOU with the GGGI. And the two leaders welcomed Korea's decision to join the Global Green Growth Forum (GGGF), a global consultative in Denmark. GGGF inforced the partnership with the GGGI. GGGF aims to reduce greenhouse gas emissions and avoid the use of unsustainable resources through innovative and activity-oriented private partnerships while promoting international economic growth. The international public-private consultative body configured in high-level meeting attended by two leader.

== Education ==
Lego was first introduced in Korea in 1984, and Lego education systems have been introduced in Korea since 1995. In 2001, the corporate ALKO proposed the establishment of the Lego Education center in Korea to the Denmark Lego Company, and succeeded in pilot operation. Currently, there are about 140 centers in the Korea. The Lego Education Center is a place where children can learn about the typical education system of the Danish Lego Company and can receive creativity, concentration and robot education using Lego education products. Although it is Denmark that produces Lego toys, Korea has brought along Lego from Denmark to develop education programs in Korea's creative way. The year 2009 marked the 50th anniversary of the establishment of diplomatic ties between Denmark and Korea. In honor of this, Lego created toy towers to prove that the two countries are in a friendly relationship, and donated them to children's organizations through Lego Education. Danish Education Minister Bethel Harder and Korean national assembly Park Young-sun built Lego bricks with children at the Shindorim Lego Education Center in Seoul on August 25. They delivered messages of congratulations and experienced learning to build creativity and expression while building cars, animals with Lego bricks.

== Trade ==
South Korean exports to Denmark in 2009, was $479 million. During 2017, Danish exports to South Korea were $623.59 million. $207M (33%) were in machinery, nuclear reactors and boilers. $62.1M (10%) were in electrical and electronic equipment. $56.8M (9.1%) were in optical, photo, technical and medical apparatus. $45M (7.2%) were in meat and edible meat offal. $37.5M (6%) were in dairy products, honey and edible products.In 2024, trade between Denmark and South Korea was valued at $1.8 billion.

== Issues ==
=== Olympics ===
The relationship between Denmark and South Korea continues at the Olympic. At the 2004 Athens Olympic, the women's handball teams of the two countries competed in the finals. Denmark was won the gold medal by beating Korea in the Atlanta Olympic final in 1996. In the final match, Denmark and South Korea played neck and neck, with 34 to 34 points for extra time. South Korea lost the match to Denmark by a score of 2–4 to win the silver medal. The AP Press in U.S.A chose this game as the best match in the 2004 Athens Olympics. And this Handball match was made into <Forever the moment> by Yim Soon-rye film director in 2007 because it impressed many Koreans. It has become a popular work representing Korean sports films, and since its release, the South Korean media has used the term ' Woo Saeng-soon, ' a short term for the title of the movie, when delivering news from the women's handball national team.

== High level visits ==
Danish Prime Minister Anders Fogh Rasmussen visited South Korea in 2006 and in October 2007, Queen Margrethe II of Denmark visited Seoul for the first time after the official diplomacy between both nations. In 2009, 50-years of diplomatic relations between Denmark and South Korea was celebrated in both countries. In March 2010, Danish Prime Minister Lars Løkke Rasmussen visited South Korea. On 11 May 2011, South Korean President Lee Myung-bak visited Denmark.

== See also ==
- Foreign relations of Denmark
- Foreign relations of South Korea
- List of Ambassadors from Denmark to South Korea
