= Iceland–South Korea relations =

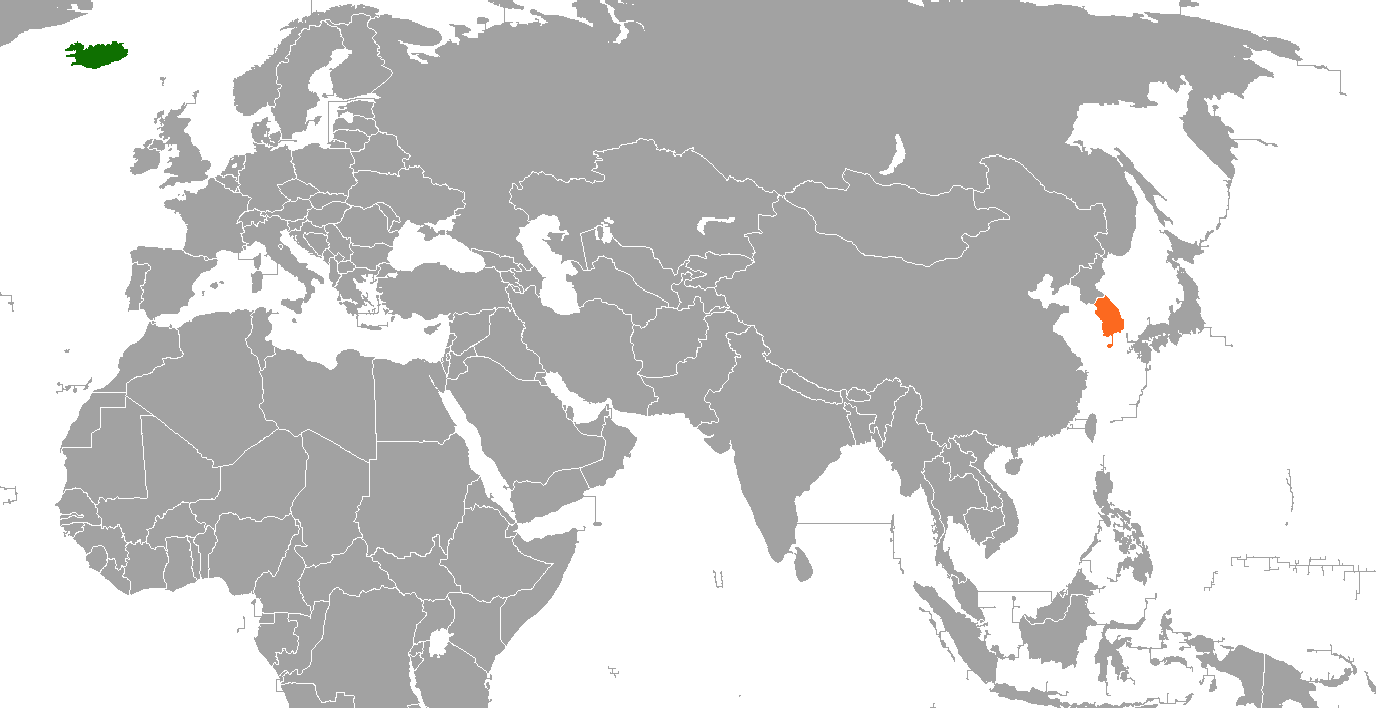
- Iceland: South Korea

Iceland–South Korea relations are primarily based on cooperation over maritime issues, such as whaling and bottom trawling, and on bilateral trade in technology and fish products. Diplomatic relations between Iceland and the Republic of Korea were established on October 10, 1962, according to the Korean Ministry of Foreign Affairs. The Icelandic Ministry for Foreign Affairs gives the date as 19 April 1982. Iceland's Embassy in Beijing is accredited to South Korea, and Iceland also has two honorary consulates in Seoul. South Korea's embassy in Oslo, Norway is accredited to Iceland, and South Korea has an honorary consulate in Reykjavík.

== Relations ==
South Korea's foreign minister Choi Sung-hong visited Iceland in 2002 to discuss increased bilateral cooperation between the two countries. Korea and the European Free Trade Association (EFTA) signed a Free Trade Agreement on December 15, 2005. The agreement eliminated all EFTA tariffs on Korean goods, with plans to phase out Korean tariffs on EFTA goods. In May 2008, the two countries signed an agreement on double taxation.

== Trade ==
In 2006, South Korean exports to Iceland totaled US$ 36,000,000, mainly automobiles and tires, while Iceland's exports to South Korea totaled US$ 13,000,000, mainly marine products and fur. Progress in fish processing technology and transport has opened up new possibilities for increased trade with Korea.

== Whaling activities and cooperation ==
Iceland have been involved in controversy over their continued whaling activity. In the past, South Korea has supported Iceland's whaling position. Iceland hunts whales for "scientific research", although they have passed tests of authenticity for scientific research projects set by the International Whaling Commission.

== Resident diplomatic missions ==
- Iceland is accredited to South Korea from its embassy in Tokyo, Japan.
- South Korea is accredited to Iceland from its embassy in Oslo, Norway.

== See also ==
- Foreign relations of Iceland
- Foreign relations of South Korea
- Iceland–North Korea relations
