= MS Jutlandia =

Ship

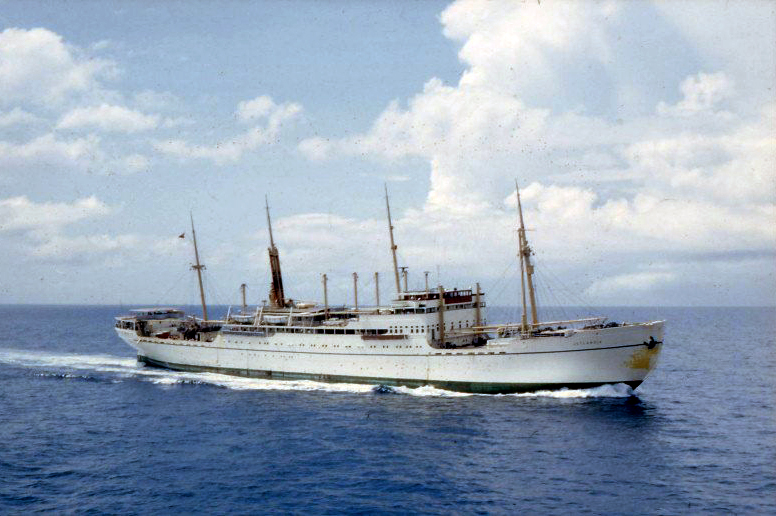
- MS Jutlandia, picture taken from MS Korea in 1963

History

Denmark
- Name: MS Jutlandia
- Ordered: 1934
- Builder: East Asiatic Company, Nakskov Shipyard, Denmark
- Yard number: 60
- Launched: 11 August 1934
- Completed: 1934
- Fate: Scrapped 1965

General characteristics
- Tonnage: 8,457 gross register tons (GRT); 5,204 NRT
- Length: 461 ft (140.5 m) LOA; 425 ft (130 m)
- Beam: 61 ft (19 m)
- Draught: 36 ft (11 m)
- Installed power: 7,850 ihp (5,850 kW), 6,500 bhp
- Propulsion: 2 Burmeister & Wain 5-cylinder diesel motors type: 545-WF-120 Twin screw
- Speed: 15 knots (cruising); 17.1 knots (trial)
- Capacity: 69 in 34 first class cabins; 539,570 cubic feet (15,278.9 m^{3}) cargo
- Crew: 70, including 1 doctor

MS Jutlandia (Lat.: Jutland) was contracted by and built for the East Asiatic Company (EAC) in 1934, as a combined passenger and cargo ship at EAC's Nakskov Shipyard, Denmark. Following an extended operational life in which she also served as a hospital ship and a royal yacht, she was finally decommissioned in 1965.

== History ==
Jutlandia was contracted by EAC in 1934, to replace older ships on the then regular service between Copenhagen and Bangkok. She operated on this route from November 1934, until January 1940, and again from 1954 to the end of 1964. Jutlandia was the only ship in the EAC fleet to be designed with a Maierform bow. She is the second of so far three ships of the same name.

Passengers were accommodated in nine single and twenty-nine double staterooms with all double staterooms provided with a private bath. The dining room could seat seventy with smoking room, ladies lounge, bar and foredeck swimming pool also provided for passenger use. A dining and play room were provided for children. Passenger spaces were ventilated by chilled or heated air. Cargo holds provided 539,570 cubic feet (15,278.9 m^{3}) capacity.

=== World War II ===
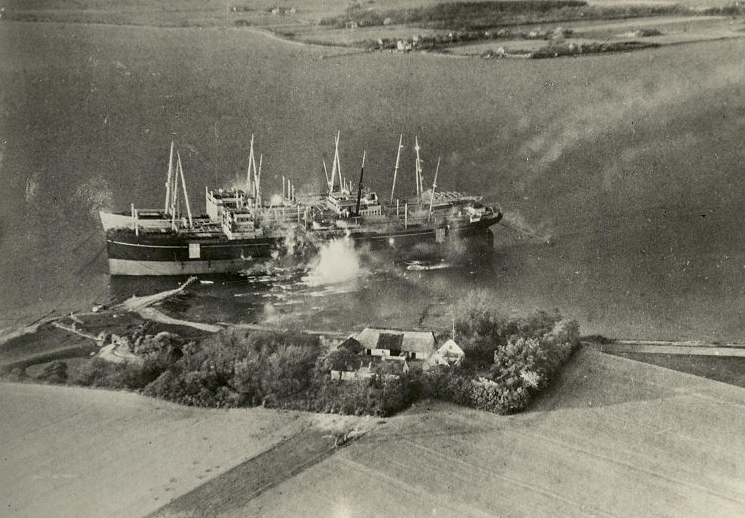
The air raid of 3 May 1945. Java is in front, Falstria in the middle, and Jutlandia at the rear. The farm was hit and burned out completely.

When World War II broke out in September 1939, the ship had just arrived at Rotterdam en route for Copenhagen. As Denmark was not yet part to the war, she completed this and one further voyage to Bangkok, finally returning to Copenhagen in January 1940.

Following her arrival in Copenhagen, Jutlandia was placed at the disposal of the Danish Government. She was sent to Argentina to collect a consignment of grain, returning to Copenhagen on 31 March 1940. On 1 April, she was sent to Nakskov Shipyard for routine overhaul. Jutlandia was in dry-dock when Germany attacked and occupied Denmark on 9 April 1940. Due to a shortage of diesel oil, Germany did not seize the Jutlandia. Instead, she was laid up at the Slotø island in a small inlet close to the shipyard, together with two other motorships from the EAC fleet, the MS Java and MS Falstria, with a skeleton crew to provide maintenance.

Here she remained until the end of the War, despite an allied air raid on 3 May 1945. During the attack the Java was sunk, while Falstria suffered some flooding and a fire. Jutlandia got off with some bullet holes and a minor fire in a cargo hold.

The Jutlandia was fully seaworthy again by 11 August 1945 and re-entered commercial service between Europe and the East Coast of the United States.

== Korean War ==
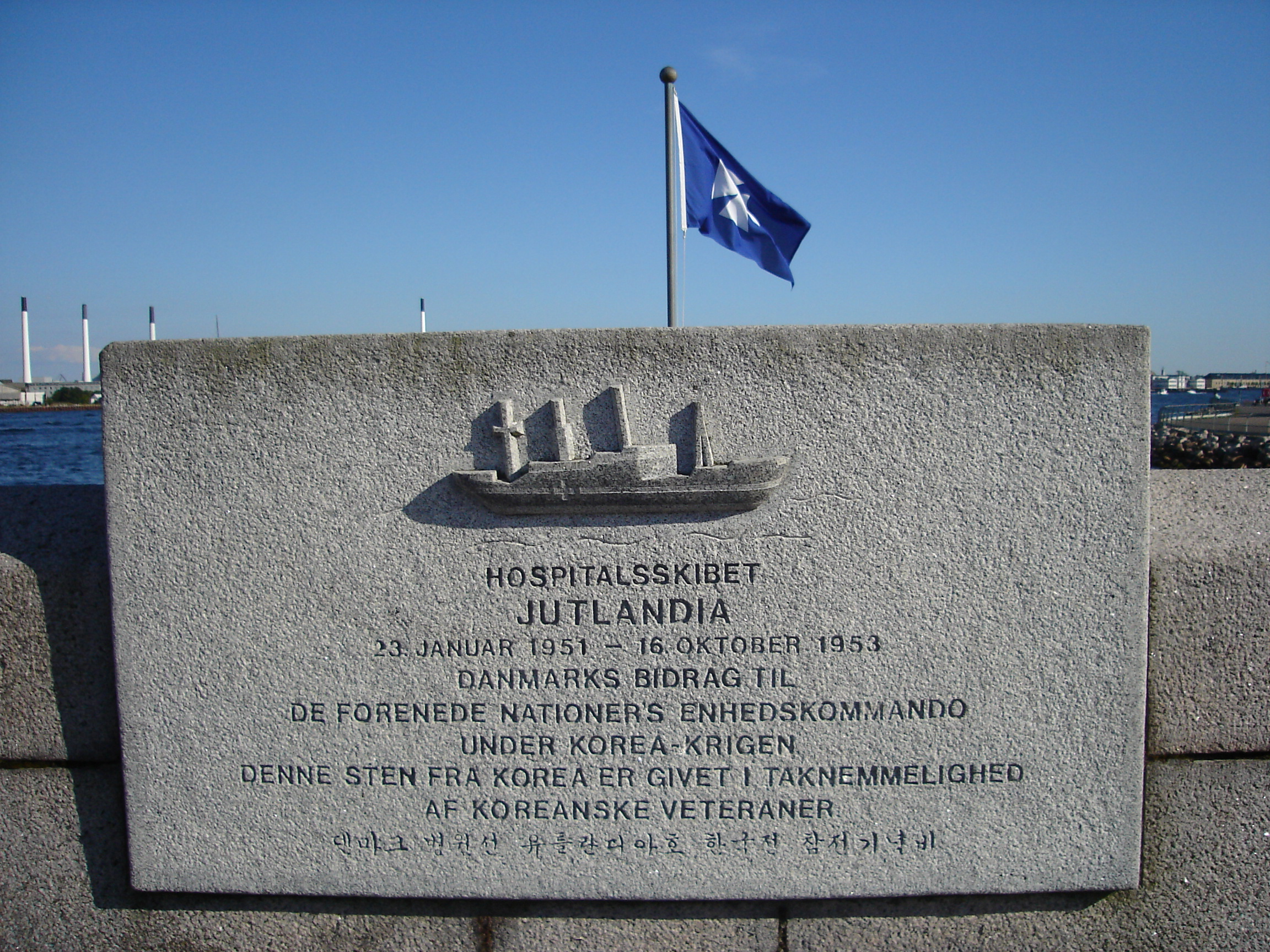
Memorial of Denmark Medical Support

When North Korean communist forces attacked South Korea on 25 June 1950, Denmark agreed to provide assistance to the United Nations Command and to give humanitarian support to the allied forces in South Korea. The decision was not uncomplicated: the mood between the superpowers was extremely tense, and Denmark had to find a way to support the UN without being aggressive. Almost instantly, medical supplies were made available, and after negotiations Denmark also agreed to send a hospital ship. In the fall of 1950, EAC again agreed to place the ship at the disposal of the Danish Government, whilst she was en route to New York City.

=== Refit ===
The Danish Government undertook the refitting of Jutlandia as a modern hospital ship, again at Nakskov Shipyard, and consigned her to Korea. She had four operation theatres, four hospital departments with up to 356 beds, X-ray, eye, and dental clinics, as well as laboratories, dispensary, and special departments.

The jobs on board were well sought after. At the time 42 nurses were needed. Between 3,000 and 4,000 nurses applied and about 200 were selected for interviews. Doctors and nurses were allocated four to a cabin.

The bulk of the hospital staff were mature and stable people. This selection was made especially in view of the badly injured patients that could be expected on board. This was not something that young people should see. The average age was around forty.

=== Status ===
The civilian status of Jutlandia was greatly emphasized. As all other hospital ships, she was painted white with red crosses on the side, but opposed to the 1½ meter high green stripe painted along the side of the military hospital ships, Jutlandia had a red stripe. Danish Red Cross was manning, organizing and running the hospital. EAC supplied the ship's crew. The state paid.

Jutlandia had Captain Kai Hammerich as senior officer. He quit his job as president for the Danish Red Cross to be able to go on the mission to Korea. He kept his rank as naval officer (in Denmark his rank, Kommandør, is only one step below a rear admiral) in order to improve his ability to liaise with the military leaders of the U.N. forces. He was also the contact person to the Red Cross and the Danish State.

Consultant, senior doctor Mogens Winge was second in command and hospital chief. Captain Christen Kondrup, Jutlandia's skipper through many years, stayed on board as the ship's master. In case of a maritime crisis, the command over the ship would automatically transfer to Kondrup, according to maritime law.

As the hospital crew had to handle soldiers, everybody had military rank in spite of the fact that they were civilians. During the stay in Korea, visiting Allied officers were amused about how civilian everything was on board.

=== Departure ===
On 23 January 1951, she was sent to Korea. She sailed under three flags: Dannebrog (the Danish national flag), the Red Cross, and the UN flag. The day before the departure, she was visited by King Frederik and Queen Ingrid. The King knew Hammerich quite well. While he still was a crown prince Hammerich was his senior officer in the navy. The crown prince had behaved in a careless way during an exercise and literally got a slap in the face from Hammerich as punishment.

At the departure speeches were made and a small service held, and the foreign minister, a brass band and about 10,000 freezing citizens were on the quay to see the ship off. Hammerich wanted public support. He didn't want Jutlandia to 'sneak off like a thief in the night'. She sailed with a crew of 97, and a hospital staff of 91.

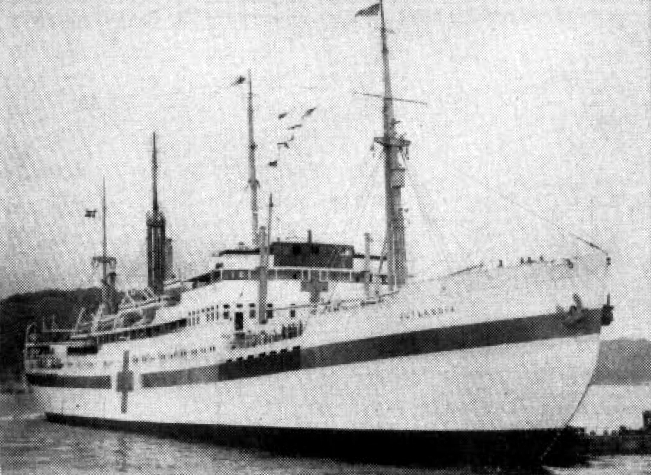
Jutlandia in Korea, 1951

Jutlandia was bound for Japan, where she should report for duty at the UN staff. The travel was quite uneventful. There was, of course, the obligatory seasickness in the Biscaya, and the hospital was needed for two patients: the ship's tailor was operated for appendicitis, and senior doctor Tage Kjær fell and burst his achilles tendon. He got a leg cast, stayed on board and did his duty on crutches.

During the transfer, the staff had to participate in some very basic military training (stand in line and salute), so they could present a nice front on arrival. For some, this was quite a nuisance - for others, a source of much joyful entertainment. Jutlandia made the journey in 38 days.

At the arrival, General MacArthur was quite outspoken:

"... There is war out here, a hard war, not like some Danish newspapers write: a Police raid ... I expect endurance, determination, discipline and initiative ..."

Jutlandia arrived at the Port of Pusan on 7 March 1951 and started her service in Pusan on 10 March 1951, about 200 km from the frontline. Depending on the intensity of the war, there were from less than 100 to over 200 wounded on board. At quiet times, there was a kind of competition with the American hospital ships to 'capture' patients.

Jutlandia's hospital had a high and internationally respected standard. As a result of this, she got some of the most difficult cases. It soon turned out that there were about ten times more surgical than medical patients. The difference was due to the modern vaccines. During e.g. World War I, the ratio was about one to one. Nobody worried much about departmental borders; with a bit of flexibility the patients were distributed where there was room.

Among the soldiers, Jutlandia was popular. The ship had room – there was only about half the number of beds as on a military hospital ship of the same size – and advanced special clinics. The 'civilian treatment' together with ship's cook quickly learning to produce cheeseburgers and ice-cream in multiple servings for patients also helped in spreading the popularity of the ship.

A number of soldiers had little notes in their pockets, or tied to their dogtags, noting that if they got wounded, they wished to get transferred to Jutlandia.

The Korean people's memory of Jutlandia is heavily influenced by the fact that her hospital was the first that also treated civilian Korean citizens as well as soldiers.

Most of the time, there were vacant beds. It did not suit the crew and staff that the beds were unused when they observed the hardship and misery among the civilian population. The female nurses were not allowed ashore, but the doctors and male nurses sometimes helped on improvised first-aid stations. Without official orders, the local population received limited aid, and in certain cases, patients were brought on board. A number of orphans were also sent on board for medical care. A small children's department was created in an unused corner of the officer's ward. The American captain McKeon had started a small children's hospital, Happy Mountains, on the outskirts of Pusan, with assistance from the ship's doctors. The doctors' aid went so far that medicine 'disappeared' from Jutlandia's storage - later to be 'refound' at the children's hospital. General MacArthur certainly got the initiative he had craved.

Urged by the doctors, Hammerich kept pushing the U.N. for permission to treat civilians. The permission arrived in July 1951, under the condition that civilians were sent ashore if wounded soldiers arrived. It did happen that civilians, despite the need for further treatment, were sent ashore. The crew and hospital staff felt miserable about it.

As the summer heat approached, Jutlandia was in a bad fettle without air conditioning, which led to the decision to send her to Europe as transport for sick and injured. She departed towards Rotterdam in August 1951. The tour had its problems - amongst other things, some of the patients wanted to leave the ship during harbour stays. As this wasn't possible, it became the centre of some unrest, but in the end all the patients were brought home.

=== Second tour ===
After resupplying in Rotterdam, Jutlandia went to sea again. She arrived on 13 November at Pusan. A large part of the personnel had been replaced - some doctors got so short notice, that they couldn't get on board the ship, but were flown to Korea.

On the first tour there had been a lot of neurosurgical patients, on the second it was more lung and jaw surgery that took the weight. 100 beds were at the disposal for the Korean military hospitals, and 100 more could be used for civilian Koreans. In the beginning, the UN soldiers felt some discomfort about the Koreans, but the mood changed quickly. The children quickly became as popular with the soldiers as with the crew and staff, and could be found everywhere on the ship.

Even though Jutlandia had room for up to 350 patients, a reasonable load would be about 250, if the staff was not to be put under strain. On average, the load on this tour would be between 200 and 250 patients.

Korean doctors came on board, and were systematically educated to improve the standard. It was now 'legal' to do humanitarian work Danish style - to help where hardship was found, instead of waiting passively – the local humanitarian work ashore was continued, and school education started in the children's department. The local people were interested in Denmark, a cooperation with e.g. local priests and teachers was started: in the end a Danish – Korean friendship association was founded, not be confused for the still active Danish North Korean Friendship Association, founded almost two decades later.

It gave certain cultural problems to have civilian patients. At that time in Korea it was the rule that the hospital dealt with the treatment of the patient, whereas the supply of the patient was his own problem. So, when a patient was brought on board, the entire family, including all cooking utensils, moved into the foot end of the bed. In some cases the family could be deeply aggravated, if they were not allowed to look after their sick – the hospital staff wasn't completely trusted. Some patients tried to avoid having their bed made: it showed, that they had hidden some of their food away under the pillow. It wasn't a normal occurrence to have food every day, so it was better to ration what was there in time...

After the initial problems, things improved. The strange habits of the foreigners became known and accepted, and the local patients were happy to get on board.

Jutlandia's people became so engaged in the humanitarian work, that they often rejected their leave in Japan. Quite voluntarily, people took a double turn. The need of the often very sick Korean patients came first.

Much to the dismay of the Red Cross, no wounded POWs were allowed on board. There was deep dissatisfaction that the Red Cross were only allowed to help one side in the conflict: it was felt that the impartiality of the Red Cross was in doubt. But the military leaders of the U.N. would not allow this. To overcome the problem, some of the doctors used their spare time to aid at operations in the hospitals that treated POWs.

On 29 March 1952 Jutlandia sailed, bound for Japan. Another ambulance transport, but this time she was going all the way home to Denmark. She departed on 21 April with 194 patients on board. It was a great help, that there were no psychiatric patients on board this time. Still, there was some quarreling between the patients. The problem was solved by putting the two biggest hotheads in each their own padded isolation cell. That did the trick.

=== Third tour ===
Before the third tour, Jutlandia got a helicopter deck, an eye clinic and a number of British ambulance motorboats during her August/September 1952 refit stay at Nakskov shipyard. An air conditioning system was ordered, this was installed in multiple stages, but only after the arrival in Japan. She departed Copenhagen on 20 September 1952, and reached Yokohama on 2 November. The helicopter deck was then inspected and approved.

Jutlandia returned to Korea on 20 November, and a welcoming event was held in the presence of the Korean president Syngman Rhee and James Van Fleet, commander of the US Eighth Army. On this tour, she was stationed in the Inchon bay, only about 40 km from the frontline. This close to the front, the crew could sometimes observe the cannon fire, and so be prepared for the arrival of wounded. Thanks to the helicopter deck, occasionally wounded soldiers would be on board and under treatment 20 minutes after they got wounded.

Now the patients came directly from the front. Depending on the activity, this could sometimes give 24-hour business on board.

In March 1953, things were especially hot. In only 3½ days, 169 wounded arrived, of these 81 were bad cases. In the whole of March 301 patients arrived - 104 by helicopter, the rest by boat. This was a bit on the rough side for the medical staff. It was under consideration to get some reinforcements from home, but luckily things calmed down again.

The placement at anchor in the bay, as well as the larger number of wounded soldiers, reduced the amount of help that could be given to the civilians. Nevertheless, the crew found time to assist building a clinic ashore, that could provide help to the poor and sick.

As the war ground more and more to a halt, there was less for Jutlandia to do. It was suggested that she – as a civilian, neutral ship – should be the place where a truce could be negotiated, but the North Koreans rejected the idea. The truce was negotiated elsewhere, and went into effect on 27 July 1953.

Hammerich made trouble in Tokyo again. Jutlandia was sent out to do humanitarian work – any kind of humanitarian work – not to be in an idle standby position. There was no need for her anymore for military purposes, so she got sent home as an ambulance again. She departed for Yokosuka on 16 August to transfer her last patients, then she was made ready in a Yokohama shipyard for the trip home. She departed from Tokyo on 29 August with 229 patients and released POWs on board

This third transport was easier than the two previous. Only 30 patients needed medical treatment. And the POWs felt that just getting on board Jutlandia was equal to freedom, so they had no problems adapting to the ship's discipline.

She arrived to a hero's welcome in Copenhagen on 16 October 1953. After 999 days UN service, she was under the Danish flag again.

All in all, during her service in Korea Jutlandia's hospital cared for 4,981 wounded allied soldiers from 24 different nations, as well as over 6,000 civilian Koreans (the number is uncertain: the correct number may be anything up to three times as many), of these an unknown number of children. Only 29 patients died. The most prominent civilian patient was the first President of the Republic of Korea, Syngman Rhee. He was treated by the ship's dental clinic.

Following a refit at the Nakskov Shipyard, the Jutlandia resumed her normal duty between Copenhagen and Bangkok for the first time since 1939.

=== Awards and commendations ===
Jutlandia (as a meaning of medical organization) twice received the Republic of Korea Presidential Citation (27 March 1952, 27 August 1954)

Some personnel of MS Jutlandia received the South Korean orders and commendations

- Republic of Korea Order of Civil Merit (Mugunghwa [Hibiscus] Medal): Head of the dental department (1952-03-27)
- Republic of Korea Order of Civil Merit (Dongbaek [Camellia] Medal): 1 member (1951-12-29)
- Republic of Korea Order of Military Merit (Chungmu): 1 member (1951-08-21), 6 members (1951-11-30)

On 26 April 1953, Mayer of Incheon government awarded the commendation to captain of MS Jutlandia.

Crew members and medical staff were officially decorated by Denmark with the Erindringsmedaljen for deltagelse i hospitalsskibet "Jutlandia"s ekspedition til Korea 1951–1953 (Commemorative Medal for Participation in the Hospitalship "Jutlandia"s Expedition to Korea 1951–1953. (479 medals were awarded).

=== Summary ===
- Arrival: 7 March 1951
- Departure: 16 August 1953
- Hospital / Unit operations: 10 March 1951 – August 1953
- Based in: Port of Busan, Port of Incheon (since 20 November 1952)
- Personnel: 100 (quota) / 630 (total)

== Royal yacht ==
In September 1960, Jutlandia became a Royal Yacht when EAC placed it at the disposal of the king of Thailand and his suite during the official visit to Scandinavia by King Bhumibol and Queen Sirikit. From Copenhagen, the Royal couple sailed in Jutlandia to Oslo, the capital of Norway, and Stockholm, the capital of Sweden.

Following the visit, the ship returned to normal duty.

Three years later Jutlandia was selected to sail Her Royal Highness Princess Margrethe (from 1972, Queen Margrethe II of Denmark) on her official visit to the Far East, via Genoa, Heraklion, the Suez Canal, Aden, Karachi, Sri Lanka, Singapore, Bangkok and Hong Kong. On her return to Denmark, the ship resumed her commercial operations between Copenhagen and Bangkok.

== Decommissioning ==
Jutlandia completed her final voyage between Bangkok and Copenhagen on 19 December 1964, was unloaded and left EAC's roster. On 14 January 1965, she left Copenhagen on her last ever cruise to Bilbao, where she was scrapped.

== Aftermath ==
For reasons unknown, Jutlandia was slowly forgotten, until the song Jutlandia by Kim Larsen, a major hit in Denmark in 1986, brought her to public attention again. The song praises the role of Jutlandia in the Korean War.

== Memorials ==
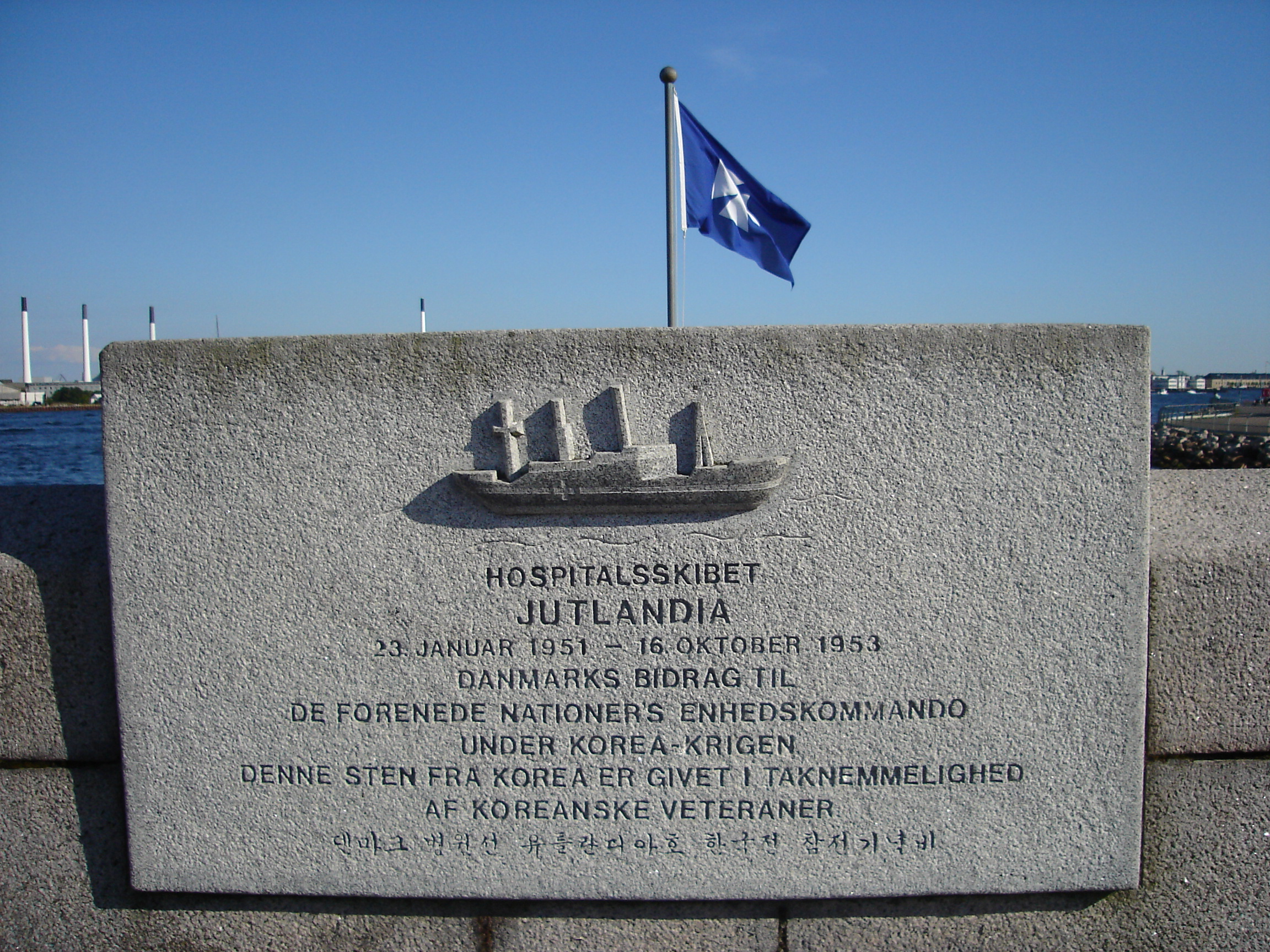
MS Jutlandia memorial stone at Langelinie.

On 15 June 1990, on Langelinie, the promenade quay in Copenhagen, a memorial stone for Jutlandia was revealed. The stone is a block of Korean granite, sailed from Pusan to Copenhagen on the "new" Jutlandia, now an 80,000 hp (60,000 kW). containership.

The text - in Danish and Korean - is as follows:
"23 January 1951 - 16 October 1953.
Denmark's contribution to the United Nations during the Korean War.
This stone from Korea is given in gratitude by the Korean veterans."

Jutlandia is now a part of the Danish history, and a part of the Danish self-awareness. In a dark and gloomy age, she stands out as a symbol for "doing the right thing": bringing peace, aid and comfort to an area ravaged by war.

On 20 September 1976, Memorial for 5 countries which provided medical support: Denmark, Sweden, India, Norway, Italy was unveiled in Yeongdo District, Busan.

On 6 June 2016, Embassy of South Korea, Copenhagen opened the small memorial museum in the Embassy facility.

== In popular culture ==
Danish rock musician Kim Larsen wrote a tribute song about Jutlandia's contributions as a hospital ship during the Korean War. The song titled "Jutlandia" became a large hit in Denmark in 1986.

The Jutlandia was featured in the Danish TV drama series 'Sygeplejeskolen' (The New Nurses) which depicted the innovative integration of male nurses into a Danish hospital training program. A senior female nurse is accepted to serve on the Jutlandia in Korea.

== See also ==
- Medical support in the Korean War
- United Nations Forces in the Korean War

== Bibliography ==
- Pacific Marine Review (1935). "New Motorship Jutlandia". Pacific Marine Review. XXXII (3). San Francisco: J.S. Hines.

== Documentaries ==
- Jutlandia-999 Days of Service in the Korean War - Arirang Prime Ep220
- 6.25 70주년 특집 유틀란디아호의 항해-1부 / The Voyage of Jutlandia-1
- 6.25 70주년 특집 유틀란디아호의 항해-2부 / The Voyage of Jutlandia-2
- 6.25 70주년 특집 유틀란디아호의 항해-3부 / The Voyage of Jutlandia-3
