= List of ambassadors of Denmark to South Korea =

Danish Ambassador to South Korea
- Coat of arms of Denmark
- Incumbent; Thomas Lehmann
- Residence: Namsong Building 5th floor, 272 Sowol-ro, Yongsan-gu; Seoul 140-775 Republic of Korea
- Deputy: Jesper Vibe-Hansen
- Website: http://sydkorea.um.dk/en

The list of ambassadors from Denmark to South Korea began long after diplomatic relations were established in 1902. The official title of this diplomat is "Ambassador of Denmark to the Republic of Korea."

Danish-Korean diplomatic relations were initially established during the Joseon period of Korean history.

After the Denmark-Korea Treaty of 1902 was negotiated, ministers from Denmark could have been appointed in accordance with this treaty. However, diplomatic affairs were initially handled by the Belgian representative in Seoul.

== List of heads of mission ==
=== Consuls-General ===
- Leon Vincart, Belgian Consul-General

=== Ambassadors ===
- 2004 Lief Donde
- September 26, 2005 Poul O. G. Hoiness (also ambassador to North Korea)
- October 12, 2010 Peter Lysholt Hansen
- September 12, 2014 Thomas Lehmann (also ambassador to North Korea)

== See also ==
- Denmark-Korea Treaty of 1902
- List of diplomatic missions in South Korea
