= Iceland–North Korea relations =

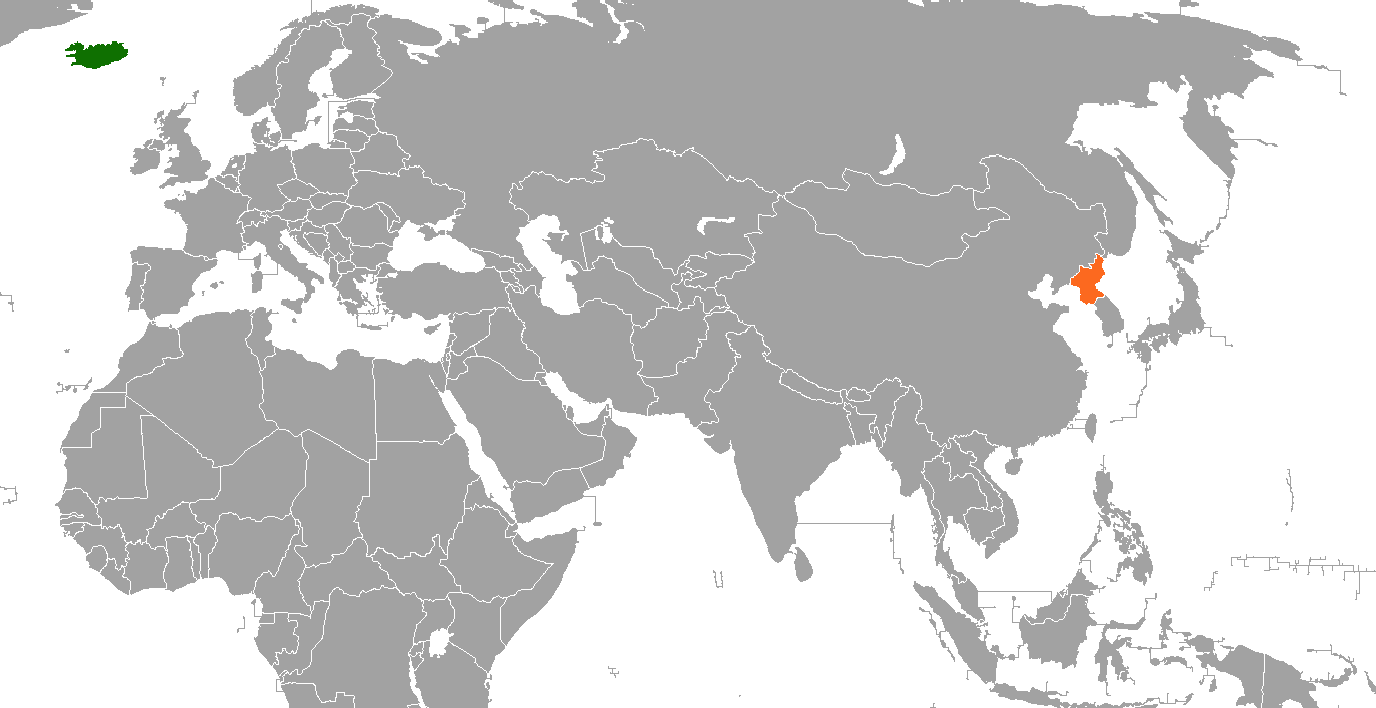

- Iceland: North Korea

Iceland–North Korea relations refers to the current and historical relationship between Iceland and the Democratic People's Republic of Korea (DPRK), commonly known as North Korea. Neither nation maintains an embassy in their respective capitals. Instead, the Icelandic ambassador in Beijing is also accredited to North Korea, while the North Korean ambassador in Stockholm is accredited to Iceland. The Swedish embassy in Pyongyang handles visa matters on behalf of Iceland.

== History ==
According to most sources, diplomatic relations between the two countries were established in 1973, when all Nordic countries jointly opted to recognize the DPRK, ending the country's diplomatic isolation in Western Europe. The Icelandic non-resident embassy to North Korea on the other hand states this took place on 2 April 1982, a decade later.

In the 1980s, pro-DPRK organizations and juche study groups were established in Iceland as in many other countries, as part of North Korean diplomatic efforts to build support for itself. One of these was the Icelandic Solidarity Committee for Reunification of Korea, which visited Pyongyang in the decade's first years, and the Iceland–Korea Friendship and Cultural Society which sent a delegation led by its General Secretary Hrafn Harðarson during the decade's later half. The Iceland–Korea Friendship and Cultural Society remained active as of at least 2011.

Following the 1988 Summer Olympics, Iceland's non-resident ambassador to North Korea at the time stated that he had never visited the country. In 2009, the Icelandic Minister for Foreign Affairs at the time, Össur Skarphéðinsson, expressed his deep concerns with the ongoing missile crisis, and called for North Korea to return to the negotiations with the international community. In 2013 the non-resident DPRK ambassador Pak Kwang Chol presented his credentials to President Ólafur Ragnar Grímsson. The two also discussed fishing, geothermal energy, and development programs. The ambassador was recalled only two months later, following the purge and execution of Jang Sung-taek, of whom the ambassador was a close associate.

== See also ==
- Foreign relations of Iceland
- Foreign relations of North Korea
- Iceland–South Korea relations
