= Caritas Denmark =

Danish humanitarian and development agency

- Caritas Danmark
- Type: Nonprofit
- Legal status: association (forening)
- Headquarters: Gl. Kongevej 15
- Location: Copenhagen, Denmark
- Coordinates: 55.67385°N 12.55748°E
- Origins: Catholic Social Teaching
- Region served: Denmark and worldwide
- Fields: development aid, humanitarian aid, social services
- Secretary General: Maria Krabbe Hammershøy
- President: Christa Bonde
- Main organ: board of directors
- Affiliations: Caritas Europa, Caritas Internationalis, Global Focus
- Revenue: 82,5 million DKK (2022)
- Website: www.caritas.dk

Caritas Denmark (Danish: Caritas Danmark) is a Danish nonprofit organisation. It is the official aid organisation of the Catholic Church in Denmark and implements some social services in the country, while the core of its work are humanitarian and development programmes abroad.

The organisation is a member of the global Caritas Internationalis confederation and of Caritas Europa.

== Background ==
In 1947, Knud Ballin and Kaj F. Meldahl founded Caritas Denmark to organise emergency aid for German refugees in Europe after World War II. Since its founding, the organisation has grown from a small church initiative carried by a few enthusiasts to a professional organisation, working both through employed staff and with volunteers. In 2007, Jann Sjursen, a former politician, assumed the position of Secretary General, which he held until 2019.

Its values are rooted in Catholic social teaching and in the UN Universal Declaration of Human Rights. Despite being a Catholic organisation, persons are supported based on need, regardless of religious affiliation.

Its work is funded by collections and donations from individuals, companies and foundations in Denmark, including Danida. Caritas is one of the 18 strategic NGO partners of the Danish Ministry of Foreign Affairs for the 2022–2025 period. The organisation is one of the NGO partners of DG ECHO and certified against the Core Humanitarian Standards since 2018.

== Work ==
The bulk of Caritas Denmarks work takes place at the international level. The organisation supports the development and humanitarian programmes of its partner organisations in Bangladesh, Burkina Faso, Jordan, Lebanon, Myanmar, Niger, Uganda and Ukraine. Caritas Denmark works according to the localisation principle, i.e. by supporting local partners as opposed to directly implementing activities abroad. As part of this committent, Caritas Denmark is one of the signatories of the international Charter for Change.

In Denmark, Caritas provides social services to vulnerable populations, mostly migrants and refugees, for example by operating a clinic and a shelter for migrants. Both are located in Vesterbro, in proximity to Copenhagen Central Station. In 2022, Caritas Denmark first published its podcast Jeg har set verden styrte i grus ("I've seen the world come crashing down") with the purpose of raising awareness among the Danish public about those experiencing humanitarian emergencies.
